= Crossair Europe =

Regional airline of France (1997–2005)

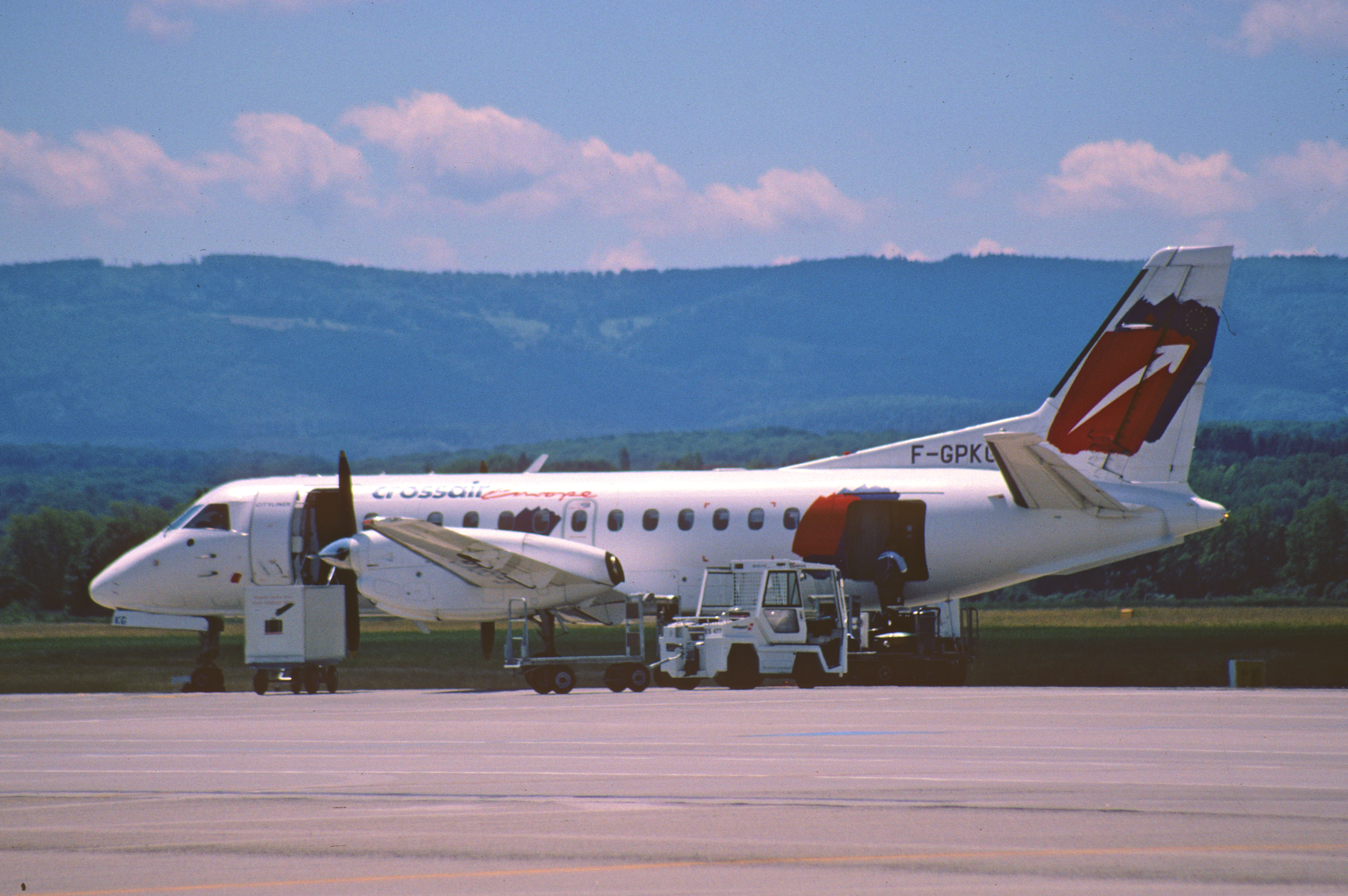
- Saab 340B
IATA	ICAO	Call sign
QE	ECC	CIGOGNE
- Founded: 1997
- Commenced operations: 1998
- Ceased operations: 28 March 2005
- Operating bases: EuroAirport Basel Mulhouse Freiburg
- Frequent-flyer program: Qualiflyer (1997–2002); Swiss TravelClub (2002–2005)
- Fleet size: 4
- Parent company: Crossair (1997–2002); Swiss (2002–2005)
- Headquarters: Saint-Louis, Haut-Rhin, France

Crossair Europe (also known as European Continental Airways) was an airline headquartered on the grounds of EuroAirport Basel Mulhouse Freiburg in Saint-Louis, Haut Rhin, France, near Basel, Switzerland. It operated scheduled services to destinations in Italy and France.

== History ==
In 1998, Crossair launched Crossair Europe, as a subsidiary airline, operating flights from the French side of EuroAirport to circumvent challenges of European Union restrictions on Swiss air traffic and routes. Initial flights were offered to Marseilles, Milan and Venice, starting in April 1998. Swissair held a majority stake of 60% in the new airline, whilst Crossair retained 40%. Initially Crossair Europe operated dry-lease Saab 340B aircraft, later moving to the larger Saab 2000 models. The airline helped boost Crossair's 1998 passenger total to a record 4.43 million. In combination with Crossair, Swissair boosted destinations served from Basel to 71 in 2000 (up from 39 Crossair destinations in 1990).

When Swissair became Swiss International Airlines, Crossair Europe remained owned by the new airline as the 99.9% shareholder. In March 2005 it was announced that Crossair Europe would be closed by the end of the month and their routes were taken over by Swiss.

== Livery ==
Crossair Europe utilized a similar livery to Crossair, predominantly white aircraft with red and blue icons across the fuselage. The tailfin however, retained the red of the Swiss national flag, but replaced with a white arrow, with a European Union star circle behind. The airline also later utilized planes with a "Eurocross" branding across the fuselage, with the European Union flag given prominence on the tail.

== Fleet ==
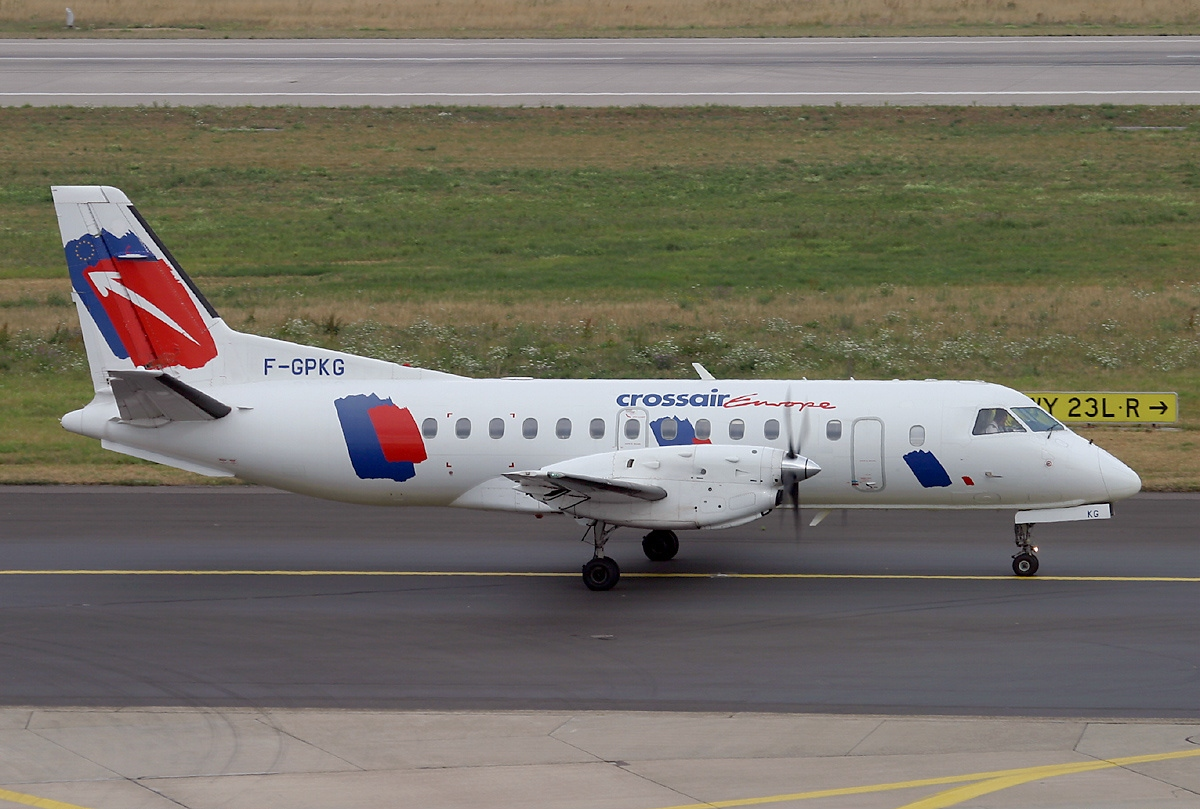
A Saab 340B taxiing at Düsseldorf Airport in 2003

During its eight-year existence, Crossair Europe operated the following aircraft:

Crossair Europe fleet
Aircraft	Total	Introduced	Retired	Notes
Saab 340B	3	1998	2005	
Saab 2000	1	2004	2005	Operated for Swiss International Air Lines.

== See also ==
- List of defunct airlines of France
