= Qualiflyer =

Frequent-flyer program (1992–2002)

- Type: Frequent-flyer program
- Introduced: 1992
- Discontinued: 2002
- Tagline: Flying European Style

Qualiflyer was a frequent-flyer program and, to some extent, an airline alliance created in April 1992 by Austrian Airlines, Crossair, and Swissair. Swissair extended Qualiflyer to become the frequent flyer programs of other European airlines when it began acquiring stakes in them in 1998. This spawned the alliance known as the Qualiflyer Group. With the failure of Swissair in 2002, the group dissolved along with the program, and a company was formed to give each former member airline an individual frequent-flyer program.

== History ==
Qualiflyer was formed in April 1992, as Europe's first frequent-flyer program, for Swissair, Crossair, and Austrian Airlines. Originally, Swissair's partner airline Crossair and its high-end hotel chain Swissôtel also participated in the program. Qualiflyer's affiliation with one of the world-class airlines caused membership to grow quickly to 2 million members in the first eight years. After that, other airlines joined the program, and the program received even larger numbers of members.

The scheme grew rapidly through Swissair owner SAirGroup's strategy of acquisition led by Philippe Bruggisser. Airlines wholly, or part, acquired by SAirGroup and integrated into the frequent-flyer program included Sabena, TAP Air Portugal, Air Europe, and LOT Polish Airlines.

However, with Bruggisser existing SAirGroup in 2001, pressure on the frequent-flyer scheme was growing, as Sabena required financial restructuring and Crossair CEO Moritz Suter declared that Swissair was looking to sell a number of Qualiflyer member investments. Following the collapse of Swissair in October 2001, Qualiflyer was formally collapsed by member airlines in 2002. At the time of closure, it had 3.7 million members.

The reformed Swiss International Air Lines is a member of Miles & More, alongside Qualiflyer founder Austrian Airlines. The Belgian flag-carrying successor of Sabena, Brussels Airlines, is also a member of Miles & More alongside other former Qualiflyer airlines, including LOT Polish Airlines and TAP Air Portugal.

== Logo and livery ==
The Qualiflyer Group logo resembled a blue globe surrounded by two swooping arms. Ten stars encircled the entire globe, symbolizing the ten member airlines. Airlines participating in the group were required to fly airplanes with a rather large Qualiflyer logo sticker applied. A number of the airlines would adopt Qualiflyer liveries, notably Swissair's "Blue Belly" design. This was the first time a frequent-flyer alliance had been advertised using the airplane livery, something that would become common place with Star Alliance in the future.

== Club levels ==
The Qualiflyer program always made a distinction between genuine frequent flyers and other traveling members. That is why, when Qualiflyer launched in 1992, two account types were introduced: the Qualiflyer basic level, for everyone wishing to collect miles, and the Qualiflyer Travelclub, for more frequent travelers. To meet the needs of particular target groups better, further club levels were added. The Travelclub Gold, for very frequent travelers, and the Qualiflyer Circle, for an exclusive group of selected members. The existence of the "Circle" was not actively communicated to ensure optimum exclusivity. The Circle was introduced in 1994, and the Travelclub Gold membership only many years later, in 2001. For every level, further benefits were offered.

== Member airlines ==
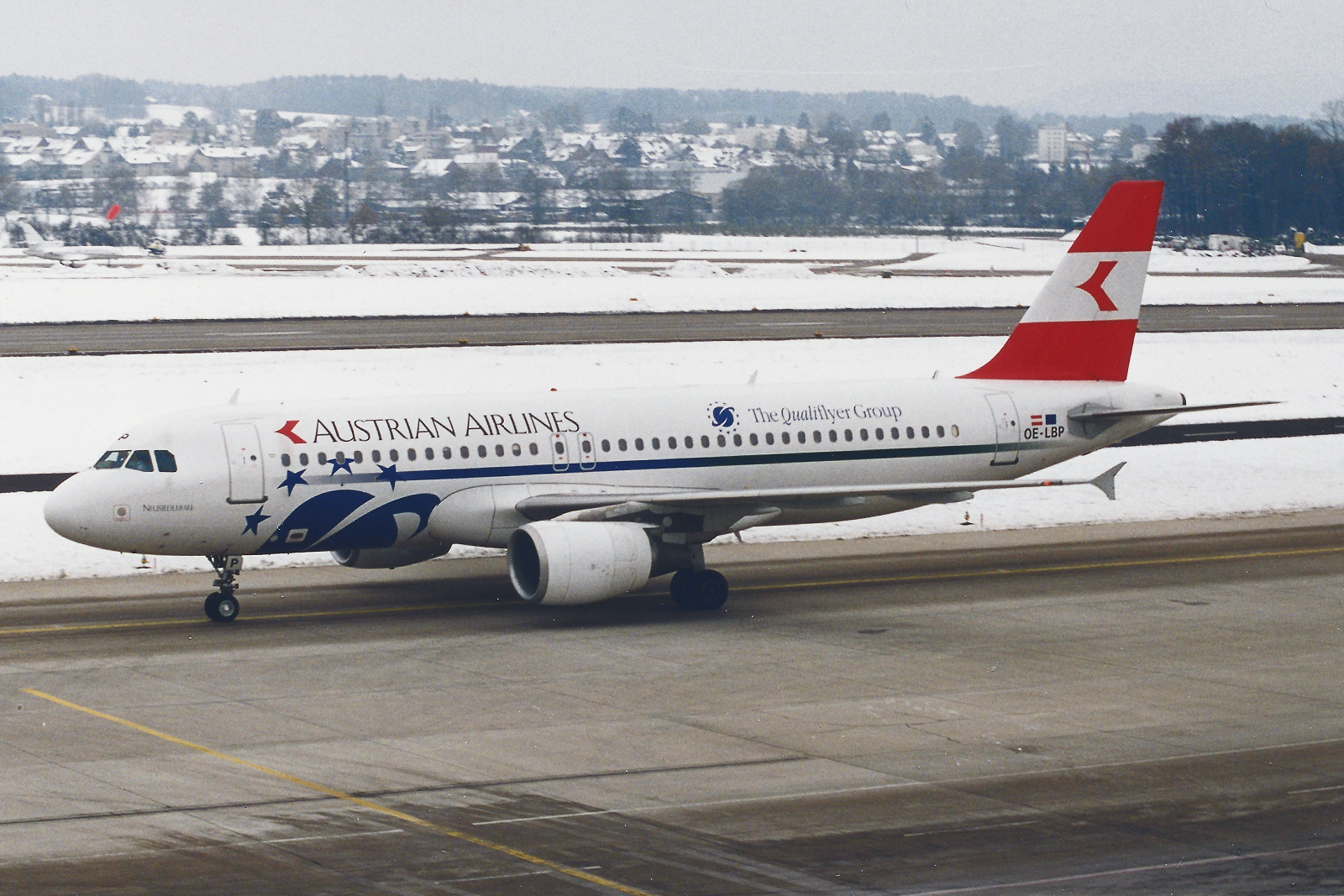
Austrian Airlines Airbus A320 in Qualiflyer Livery

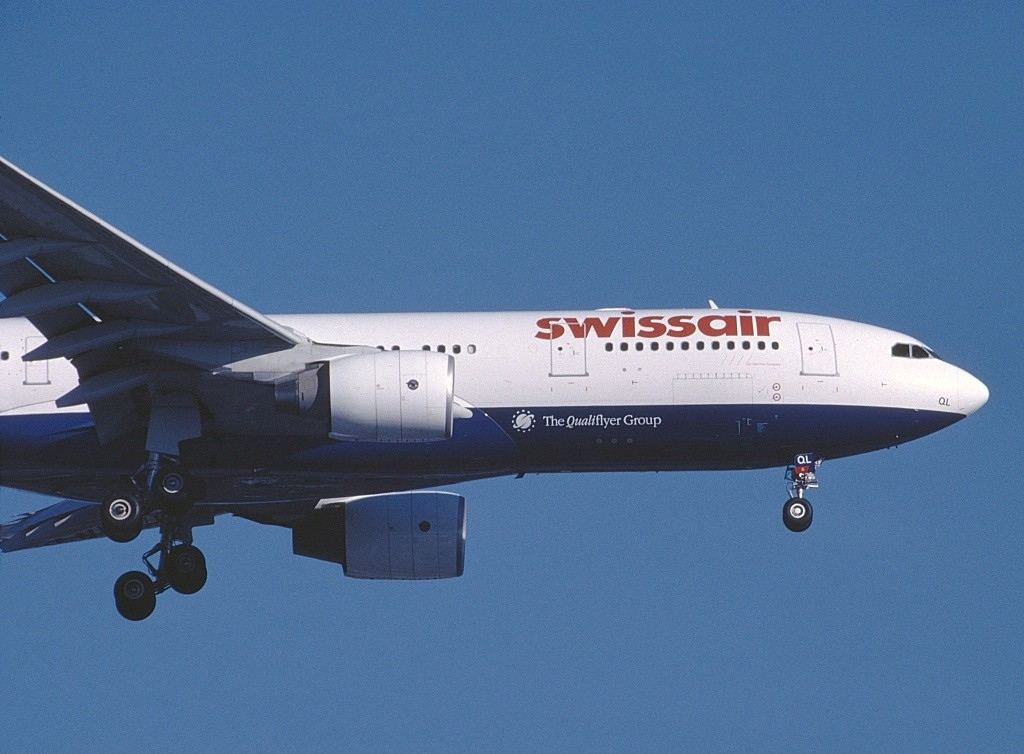
Swissair "Blue Belly" qualiflyer livery

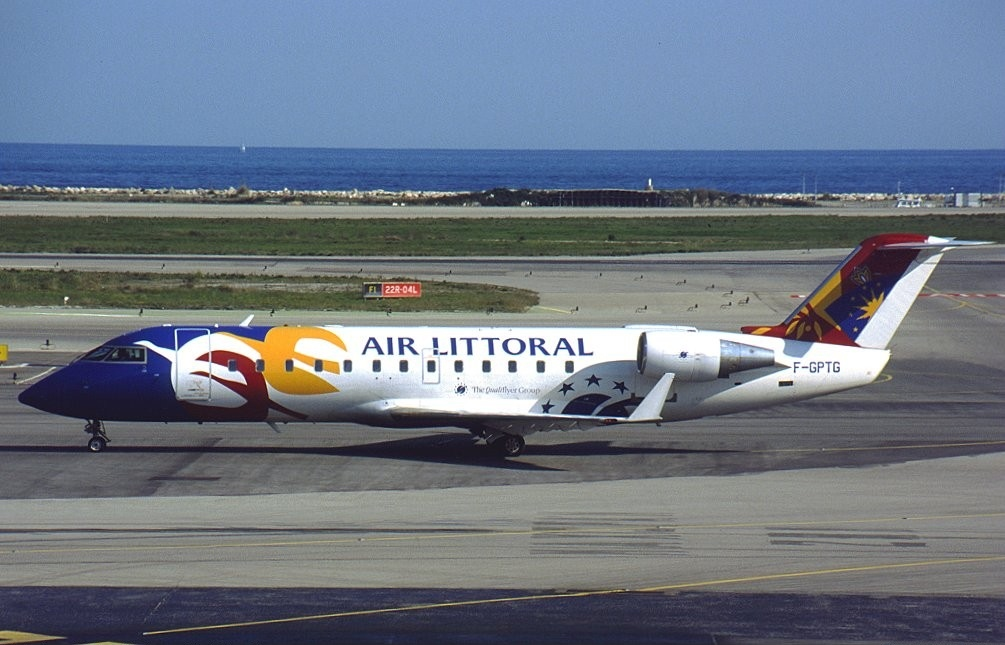
Air Littoral CRJ-100ER with Qualiflyer text and logo

The following airlines were at one point members of the Qualiflyer Group or partners of just the frequent flyer program:

Airline	Notes
(Italy) Air Europe	
(France) Air Liberté	
(France) Air Littoral	
(France) AOM French Airlines	
(Austria) Austrian Airlines	Founding member of the Qualiflyer frequent-flyer program. Joined the Miles & More frequent-flyer program and became a Star Alliance member since 26 March 2000. Became a wholly owned subsidiary of Lufthansa since 3 September 2009.
(Switzerland) Balair	Not part of The Qualiflyer Group, just the frequent-flyer program. Became a wholly owned subsidiary of Air Berlin in 2001, joined Oneworld as an affiliate member on 20 March 2012, and exited on 28 October 2017 due to Air Berlin's collapse.
(Switzerland) Crossair	Founding member of the Qualiflyer frequent-flyer program.
(Spain) Iberia Airlines	Joined the frequent-flyer program in July 2002 replacing LOT Polish Airlines who exited the alliance.
(Poland) LOT Polish Airlines	Joined the Miles & More frequent flyer program and became a Star Alliance member on 26 October 2003.
(Germany) LTU International	Not part of The Qualiflyer Group, just the frequent-flyer program. Merged into Air Berlin on 13 October 2009.
(Portugal) Portugália Airlines	Merged into TAP Air Portugal on 15 April 2022.
(Belgium) Sabena	
(Switzerland) Swissair	Founding member of the Qualiflyer frequent-flyer program.
TAP Air Portugal	Joined Star Alliance on 14 March 2005.
(Turkey) Turkish Airlines	Not part of The Qualiflyer Group, just the frequent-flyer program. Left the alliance before it dissolved. Joined Star Alliance on 1 April 2008.
(Italy) Volare	

== Awards ==
Qualiflyer won industry awards in a wide range of categories.

=== Freddie Awards ===
1997

- Gold for best flight reward
- Gold for best accrual bonus

2000

- 3rd best newsletter
- 3rd best program for spending miles

2001

- 2nd best award redemption
- 2nd best program for spending miles
- 3rd best frequent flyer program of the year
- 3rd best accrual bonus
- 3rd best credit card partnership

2002

- 2nd best frequent flyer program of the year
- 2nd best award redemption
- 3rd best newsletter
- 3rd best website

=== Swiss Dialogue Marketing Awards ===
This award honors the best dialogue marketing campaigns and is selected by a jury of dialogue marketing experts.

2002

- Gold award for relaunch of the Qualiflyer Circle welcome kit
- Silver award for launch of Travelclub Gold
