= C.A.I. Second =

Low-cost airline of Italy (1997–2015)

Volare and Volareweb - C.A.I. Second
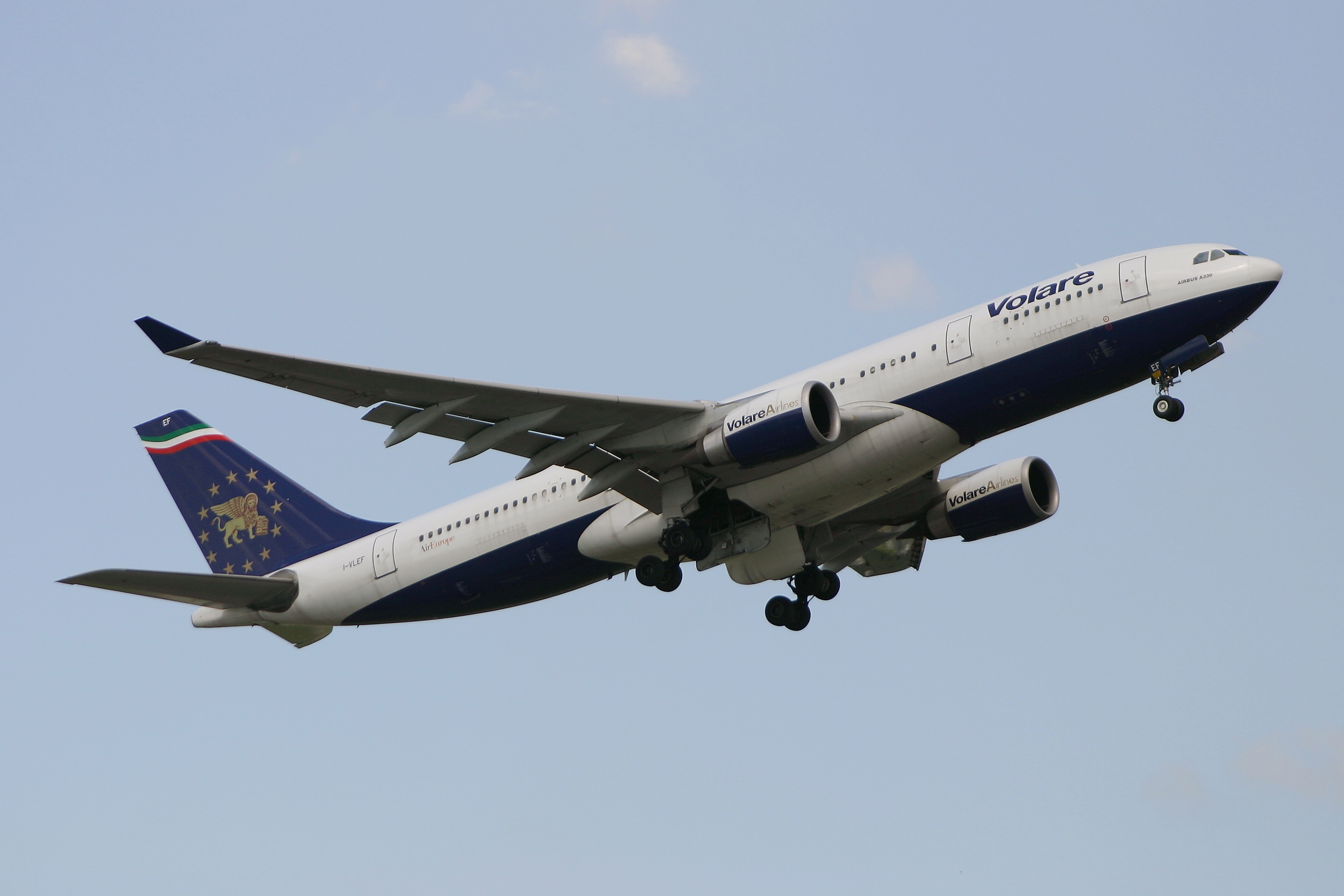
- Airbus A330-200
IATA	ICAO	Call sign
VE	VLE	VOLA
- Founded: 1997 (as Volare); 30 March 2003 (as Volareweb.com)
- Commenced operations: 3 April 1998 (as Volare); 30 March 2003 (as Volareweb.com)
- Ceased operations: 19 November 2004 (as Volare); 19 November 2004 (as Volareweb.com); 11 February 2015 (integrated into Alitalia)
- Operating bases: Milan Linate Airport, Milan Malpensa Airport
- Frequent-flyer program: Qualiflyer; MilleMiglia
- Alliance: SkyTeam (affiliate)
- Parent company: Alitalia - Linee Aeree Italiane, later Alitalia - Compagnia Aerea Italiana, and lastly Alitalia - Società Aerea Italiana
- Website: www.volare-airlines.com

Volare Airlines was an air transport company founded in 1997. Acquired by Alitalia in 2006, it merged with Alitalia - Società Aerea Italiana in 2015.

== History ==
=== Foundation and early activities ===
Gino Zoccai and former military pilot Vincenzo Soddu established the basis of Volare Airlines SpA between the end of 1997 and the beginning of the following year. Both had the initial support of the tour operator Brevitour, specialized in religious tourism. The first flights - charters only - began on 3 April 1998, departing from Bergamo and Milan-Malpensa airports. On August 28 of that same year, Sair Group (Swissair flag airline owner) became a shareholder, with a 34% stake. This push allowed for the first scheduled flights which began on May 15, 1999. Also included were the lucrative routes from Milan (indeed Bergamo airport) and Rome to Sardinia Island capital, Cagliari. In 2000, the two partners acquired Air Europe, the then-Italian leader in the charter flight market. This created the Volare Group, a holding company that controlled two airlines. The Group had its headquarters in Thiene (north of Vicenza city) and the management and charter offices in Milan. To maintain control of the Group, the owners implemented a significant capital increase, including the participation of several major banks. At one time Volare Group operated flights from Italy to London (Luton Airport), Spain, Germany, France, Belgium, Poland, Czech Republic, Estonia, and Romania.

=== The 2001 crisis ===
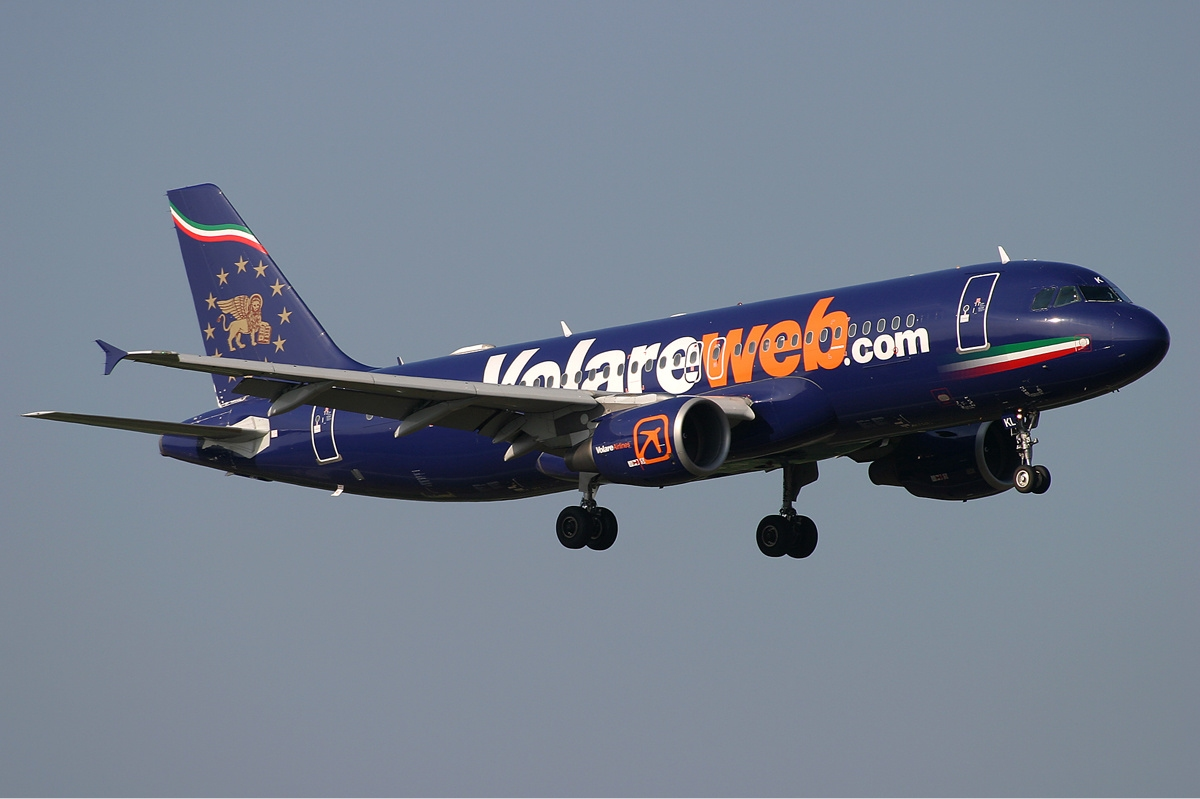
An Airbus A320-200 in Volareweb.com colors

The air transport crisis triggered by the September 11, 2001, attacks in New York led to the bankruptcy of Swissair. The company's shares were then bought back by Zoccai for approximately €uros 50 million. However, debts mounted, and the entrepreneur agreed to give up his majority stake. Auditors KPMG examined the company's accounts and confirmed its precarious conditions. In 2003, the idea was born to transform Volare Airlines into Italy's first low-cost airline, renaming it Volareweb coinciding with the summer schedule (from 30 March) and operating both A320 and A321 twinjets. A liquidity crisis arose around this same time, and the severity of the situation led to the suspension of operations of the two companies in the Volare Group on November 19, 2004.

=== The 2004 extraordinary administration and following transformations ===
The airline suspended its operations on November 19, 2004, and filed for bankruptcy. The causes of the crisis included major financial difficulties and the unavailability of a large part of the fleet (expired contracts but also aircraft seized by their owners). On November 30, Volare Group S.p.A., Volare Airlines S.p.A., and Air Europe S.p.A. were admitted to the extraordinary administration procedure for large insolvent companies. The Group was put up for sale by the Italian Government in December 2004. On May 28, 2005, the extraordinary commissioner Carlo Rinaldini filed a report with the Bankruptcy Registry of the Court of Busto Arsizio, detailing the causes of insolvency.

By mid-2005, but to a limited number of destinations, operations had resumed with two Airbus A.320s in the Volareweb livery and an Air Europe Boeing 767-300ER. In the meanwhile the extraordinary commissioner was in the process of restructuring the companies, pending the auction. In 2006, amidst considerable controversy and several appeals, including that of Air One, Alitalia - Linee Aeree Italiane acquired the Volare Group on April 14 (38 million €uros was the winning bid,) and renamed it Volare S.p.A. Immediately after, Volareweb and Air Europe merged under a single Air Operator Certificate (AOC) and on 15 May all the Volare Group employees were transferred to Volare SpA.

In the spring of 2007, the airline attempted a relaunch by adding two new Airbus A.320s, strengthening its low-cost flight network with new destinations to and from Milan-Malpensa, eliminating Milan-Linate, and competing on some routes with other established low-cost airlines. By May 2008, Volare flew to 20 destinations in Europe while the charter subsidiary Air Europe flew to other long-haul destinations. As of 1 January 2008, Volareweb was an integral part of Alitalia-LAI and was operating as a low-cost subsidiary. Furthermore, due to Alitalia-LAI's hub switch from Milan-Malpensa to Rome-Fiumicino, several flights from the largest airport in Lombardy were transferred to Volare. In compliance with the agreements for Alitalia-CAI - Air One merger in early 2009, these flights ceased and Alitalia-CAI adopted Air One as a subsidiary for low-fare flights. Only one Airbus A320 coming from parent Alitalia-CAI remained in the fleet to preserve the slots. Scheduled operations were scaled back in November 2008, while the last charter flight was operated in December and Air Europe was discontinued.

=== Another transformation and the merger with Alitalia ===
Shortly thereafter, Volare S.p.A. entered extraordinary administration along with Alitalia-Linee Aeree Italiane, and, as of January 9, 2009, sales of remaining Volareweb flights were suspended, informing passengers that after March 28, flights would be operated by Alitalia - Compagnia Aerea Italiana or Air One.

On January 13, the newly established Alitalia-CAI acquired Volare's assets and its AOC through CAI-Second S.p.A., a "paper company", operating flights for its parent company. It then ceased operating with its own personnel and livery. The last flight in Volareweb colors was operated on January 12, 2009, on the Brindisi-Milan Malpensa route. The carrier's license was revoked, and CAI-Second was dissolved on February 11, 2015, and its operations integrated into Alitalia mainline, whose corporate name was by then Alitalia-Società Aerea Italiana.

=== C.A.I. Second ===
When Alitalia-CAI integrated Air One operations in January 2009, it did not close CAI-Second (at that time known as both Volare S.p.A. and Volareweb.com) so that it could preserve its precious slots at Milan Linate Airport. In practical terms it was an Alitalia low-cost subsidiary. Its head office was located in Area Tecnica Sud of Milan Malpensa Airport Terminal 1 and it ceased activity with its name on 12 January 2009. The airline was then used to operate Alitalia-SAI flights from Linate Airport as CAI-Second. This was only the legal name, not used in public as all its flights were branded as Alitalia. This non-operational entity ceased operations and was merged into Alitalia-Società Aerea Italiana by February 2015.

== Destinations ==
=== Last operations ===
Volare Airlines code VE was used on some Alitalia flights from Milan Linate Airport (in this way, the air carrier could operate more flights than it would have been able to do using a single airline, as there was a limit to the operations at this airport for airlines). C.A.I. First was used for the same purpose.

=== Former destinations ===
At the time of closure Volareweb.com reached these destinations:

Finland

- Helsinki (Helsinki-Vantaa Airport)

France

- Paris (Paris-Orly Airport)

Greece

- Athens (Athens International Airport)

Italy

- Alghero (Fertilia Airport)
- Brindisi (Brindisi Airport)
- Cagliari (Cagliari-Elmas Airport)
- Catania (Catania-Fontanarossa Airport)
- Lamezia Terme (Lamezia Terme International Airport)
- Milan (Malpensa International Airport), base
- Pescara (Abruzzo International Airport)
- Venice (Venice Marco Polo Airport)

Japan

- Niigata

Malta

- Luqa (Malta International Airport)

Netherlands

- Maastricht (Maastricht Aachen Airport)
- Rotterdam (Rotterdam Airport)

Norway

- Oslo (Oslo Gardermoen Airport)

Poland

- Kraków (John Paul II International Airport)
- Łódź (Władysław Reymont Airport)
- Warsaw (Warsaw Frederic Chopin Airport)
- Wrocław (Wrocław Airport)

Portugal

- Porto (Francisco de Sá Carneiro Airport)

Romania

- Timișoara (Traian Vuia International Airport)

Spain

- Málaga (Málaga Airport)
- Valencia (Valencia International Airport)

United Kingdom

- Manchester (Manchester Airport)

== Fleet ==
At its peak, the company operated around fifteen Airbus A.320 aircraft (partly coming from the Air Europe fleet) used for short-haul flights to domestic, European, and North African destinations; six Airbus A.330-200s flew long-haul flights to various tourist destinations in the Indian Ocean, Africa, and the Caribbean. After its acquisition in 2000, Air Europe maintained a single Boeing 767 in its livery, occasionally leasing additional aircraft from third-party carriers during peak summer charter activity and during maintenance breaks. Prior to its shutdown in February 2015, the fleet consisted of the following aircraft:

C.A.I. Second fleet
Aircraft	In fleet	Passengers			
Aircraft	In fleet	J	Y+	Y	Total
Airbus A320-200	1	34	—	114	148
Total	1				

=== Historical fleet ===
Volare and Volareweb.com operated the following aircraft types in the years:

- 25 x Airbus A320-200
- 3 x Airbus A321-200
- 6 x Airbus A330-200
- 2 x Boeing 757-200
- 1 x Boeing 767-300
- 2 x leased McDonnell Douglas MD-83

In March 2010 the last two Volareweb.com Airbus A320s were repainted into Air One livery and were used alongside three others for Air One's low-fare operations.

== Gallery ==
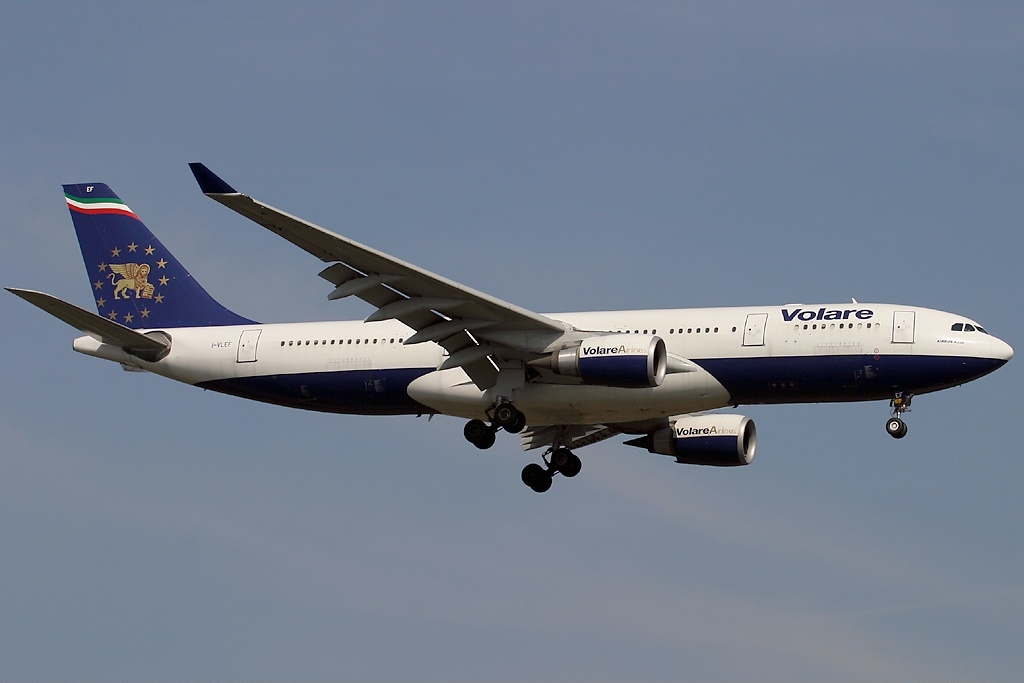
Airbus A330-200

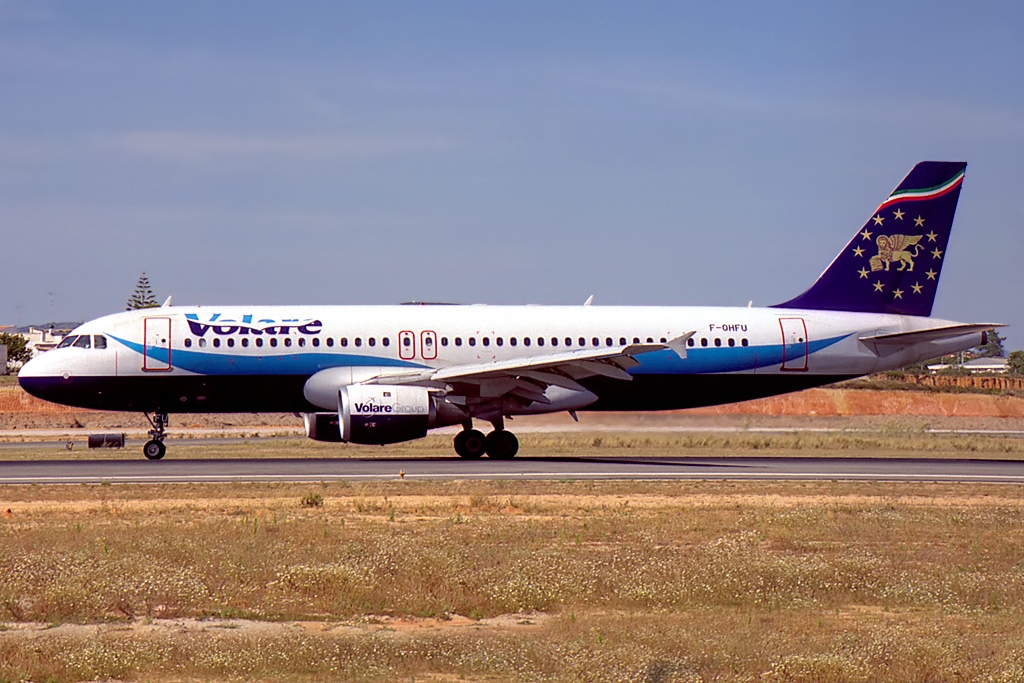
Airbus A320-200

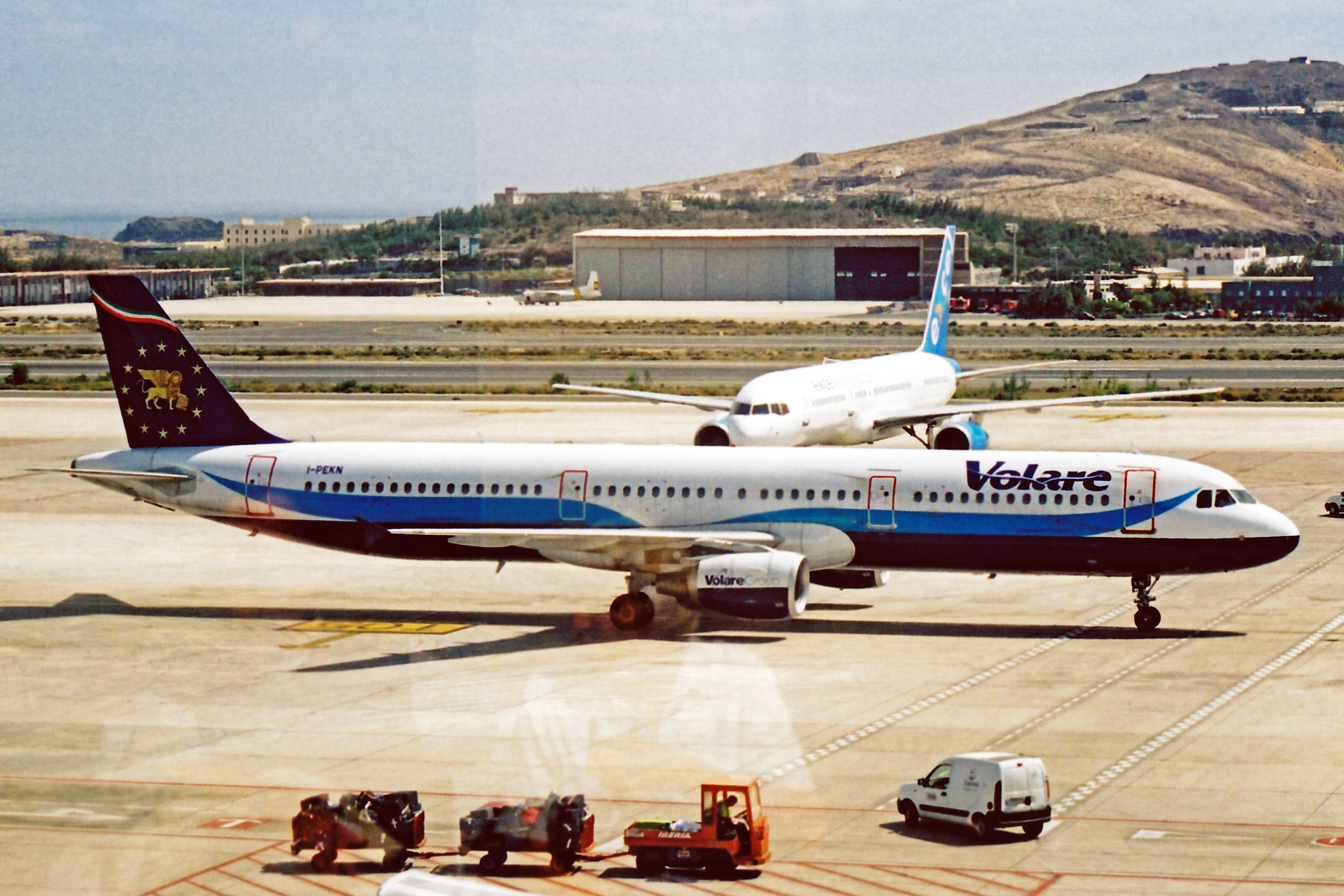
Airbus A321-200

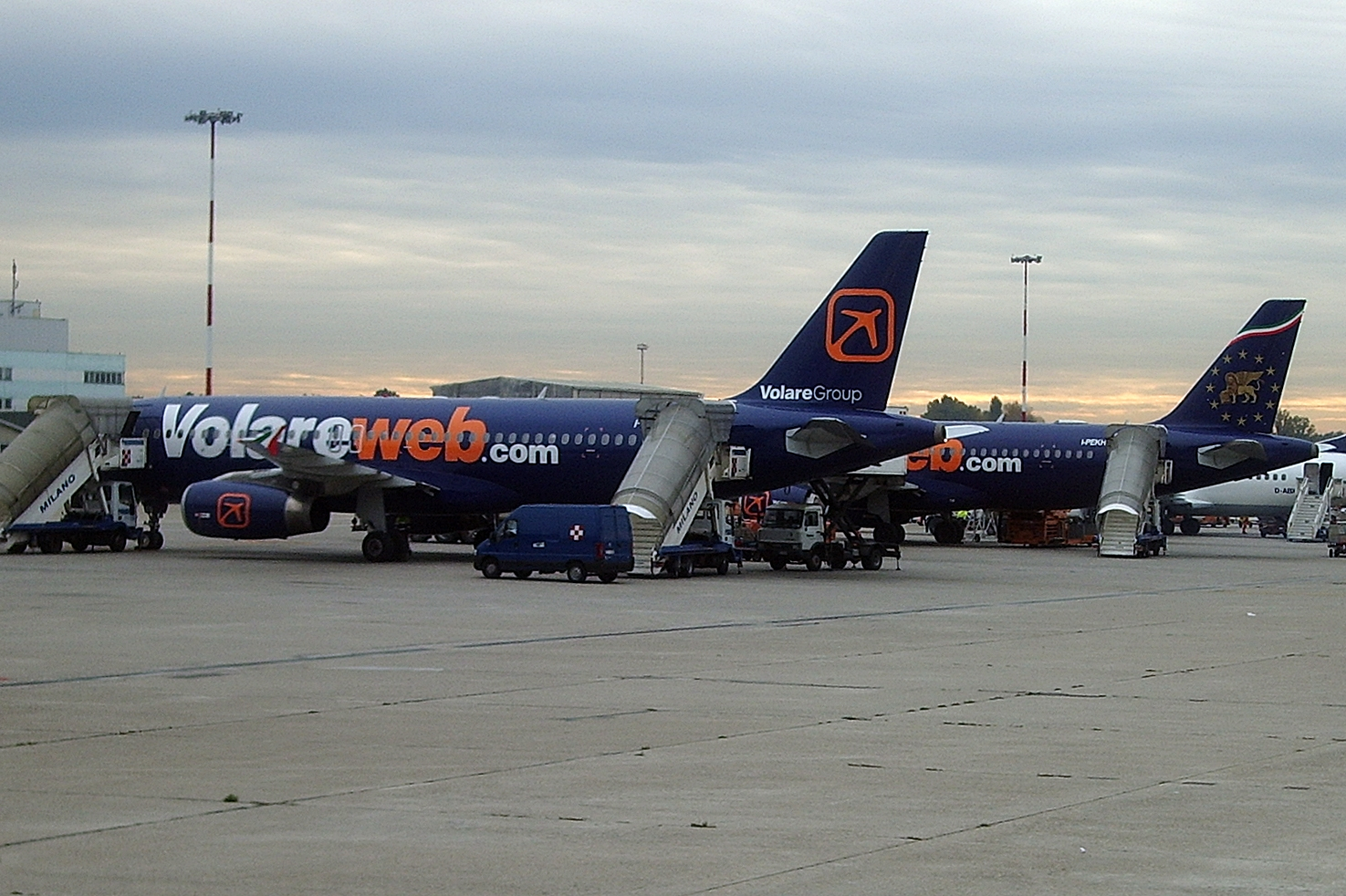
Airbus A320-200

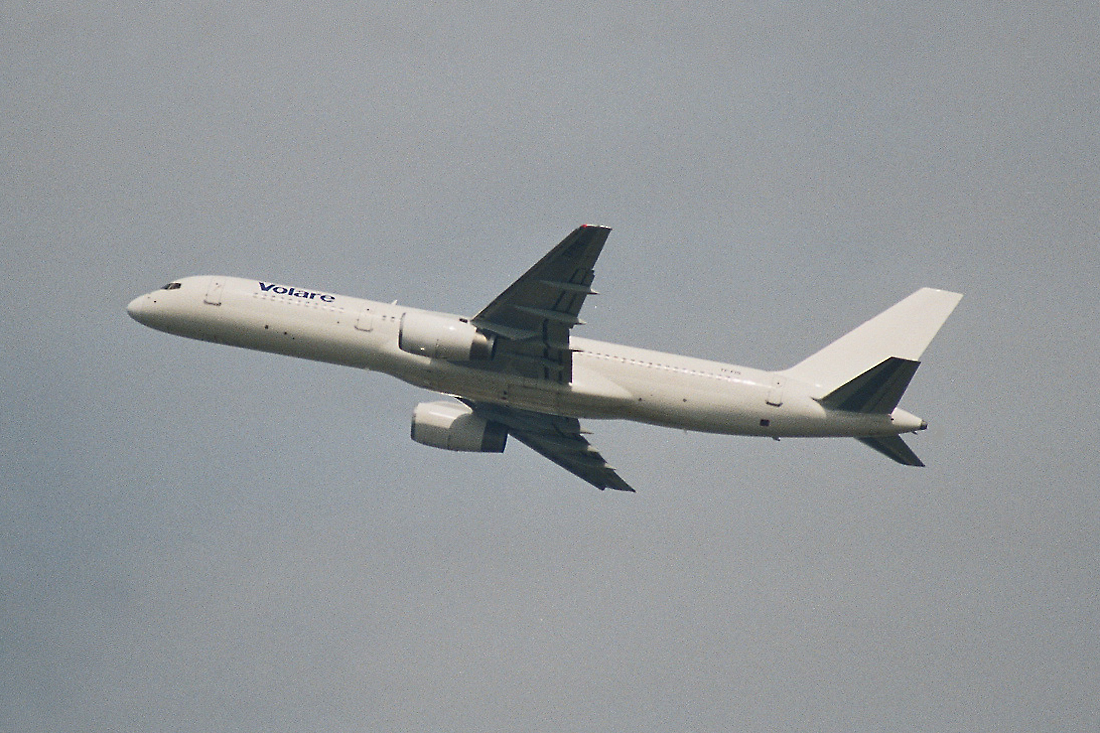
Boeing 757-200

== See also ==
- List of defunct airlines of Italy
