= Crossair Flight 498 =

2000 aircraft accident in Switzerland

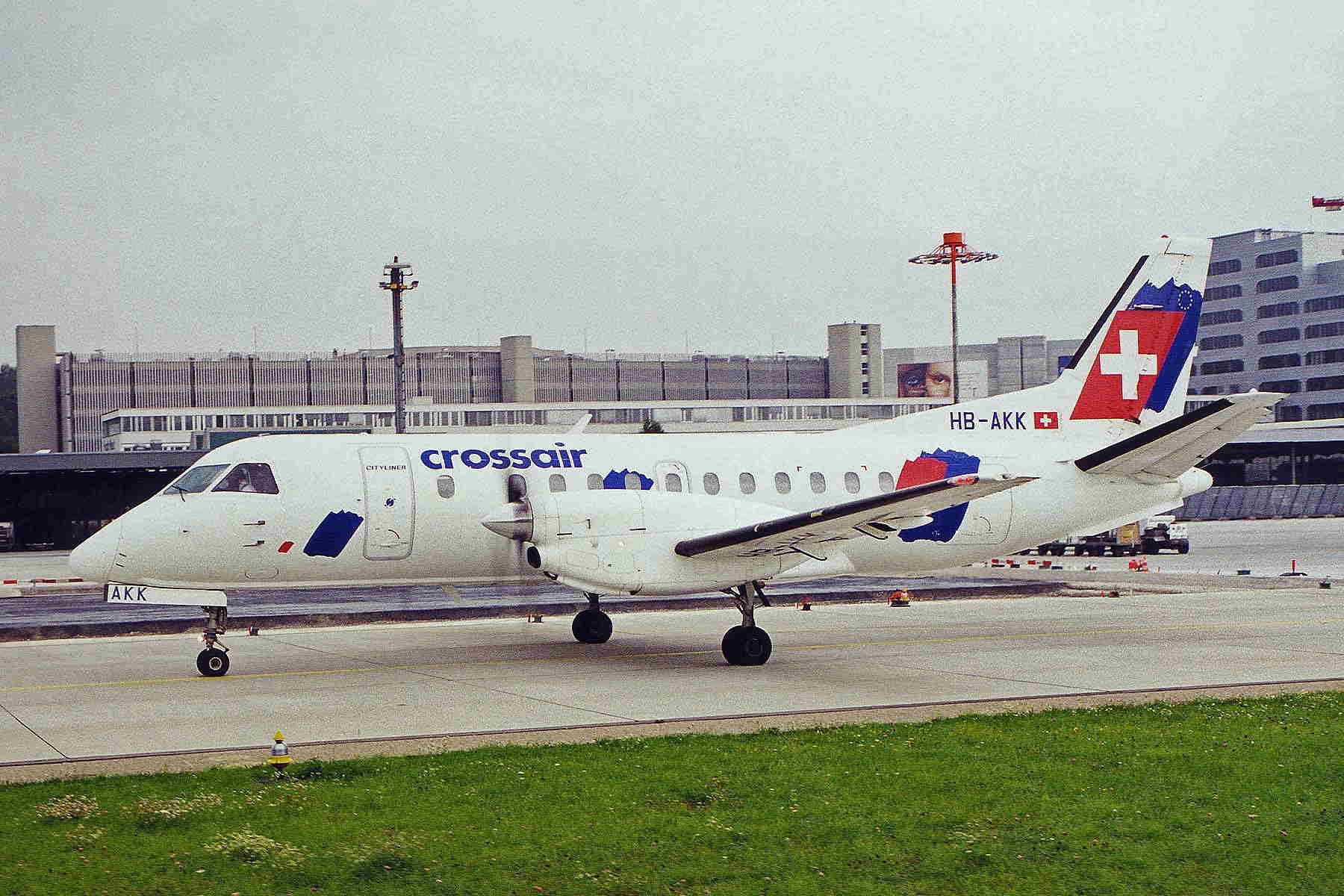
- HB-AKK, the aircraft involved in the accident, seen in 1999

Accident
- Date: 10 January 2000
- Summary: Loss of control following spatial disorientation, pilot error
- Site: Niederhasli, Switzerland; 47.470°N 8.470°E

Aircraft
- Aircraft type: Saab 340B
- Operator: Crossair
- IATA flight No.: LX498
- ICAO flight No.: CRX498
- Call sign: CROSSAIR 498
- Registration: HB-AKK
- Flight origin: Zurich Airport, Switzerland
- Destination: Dresden Airport, Germany
- Occupants: 10
- Passengers: 7
- Crew: 3
- Fatalities: 10
- Survivors: 0

Crossair Flight 498 was a scheduled commuter flight from Zurich, Switzerland, to Dresden, Germany. On 10 January 2000, the Saab 340B operating the flight crashed two minutes after takeoff in the Swiss municipality of Niederhasli, killing all 10 passengers and crew.

The accident was investigated by the Swiss Aircraft Accident Investigation Bureau (AAIB), and a final report was issued in 2004. The AAIB concluded that the crash was due to a loss of control resulting from multiple pilot errors.

At the time of the crash, Crossair was a majority owned subsidiary of SAirGroup. The crash of Crossair Flight 498 was the first time in Crossair's 25-year history that the regional airline had lost an aircraft, and was the deadliest accident to hit the SAirGroup since the crash of Swissair Flight 111, an MD-11 flying from New York to Geneva that crashed into the Atlantic Ocean off Nova Scotia on 2 September 1998, killing all 229 aboard.

== Aircraft and crew ==
The Saab 340B is a twin-engined turboprop commuter plane.

Crossair was in the process of phasing out its fleet of 34 Saab-340 type planes. The remainder of its Saab fleet was retired during the course of 2001 and 2002. The 33-seat Saab 340B airplane used for Crossair Flight 498 had been leased to Crossair from Moldavian Airlines since 1 October 1999. It had accumulated 24,000 flying hours since it was delivered to the airline in November 1990. This type of airplane had a very good safety record. The plane was carrying no freight or mail. There were no indications that anything was wrong with the aircraft. It was due for its next regular maintenance check 21 days later, on 31 January 2000.

The three-person crew was made up of 41-year-old Moldovan pilot Pavel Gruzin, who was the pilot in command, 35-year-old Slovak co-pilot Rastislav Kolesár, who was serving as the first officer, and Severine Jabrin, a French flight attendant. Gruzin had 8,100 hours of flying time, with 1,900 in the Saab 340 type. Kolesár had about 1,800 total hours, with 1,100 hours in the Saab 340 type.

== Event ==
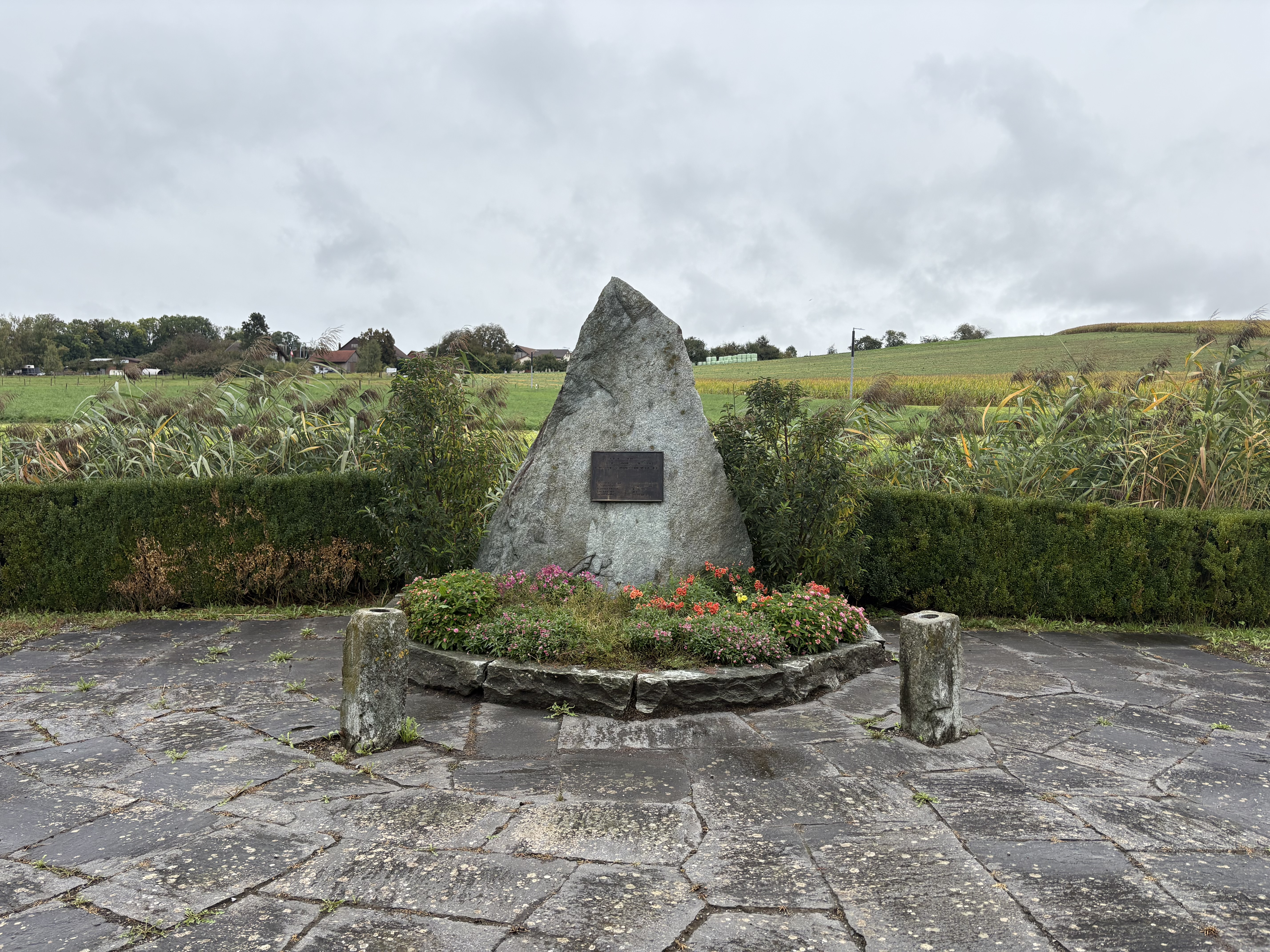
Memorial to the crash of flight 498

The plane was scheduled to depart from Zurich Airport on Monday, 10 January 2000, at around 6:00 p.m. Central European Standard Time (CEST) and arrive at Dresden Airport a few hours later. The cold, drizzly weather was normal for the area. After the seven passengers and three crew members boarded, the plane was cleared for takeoff on time at 5:54 p.m. CEST (16:54 UTC). The aircraft departed Runway 28 heading west. From takeoff, the plane climbed normally. But after 7.2 kilometers (4.5 mi; 3.9 nmi), the plane suddenly started to lose altitude and turn to the right instead of following the approved flight path to the left. When air traffic controllers asked the pilot if he meant to turn right, they were answered with "Stand by," followed by a loss of radio contact.

At 5:56 p.m. CEST (16:56 UTC), one minute and 56 seconds into the flight, the plane disappeared from radar screens and crashed into a field, instantly lighting up over 2000kg of jet fuel. Officials later determined that the plane went into a diving right turn before vanishing from radar screens. Burning wreckage was scattered for 200 to 300 metres (660 to 980 ft) near houses in Niederhasli, some 5 kilometres (3 mi; 3 nmi) northwest of the runway at Zurich's Kloten airport. The flight data and cockpit voice recorders were recovered from the accident scene, both heavily damaged. There were no survivors.

A memorial to the accident and its victims now stands at the crash site.

== Passengers ==
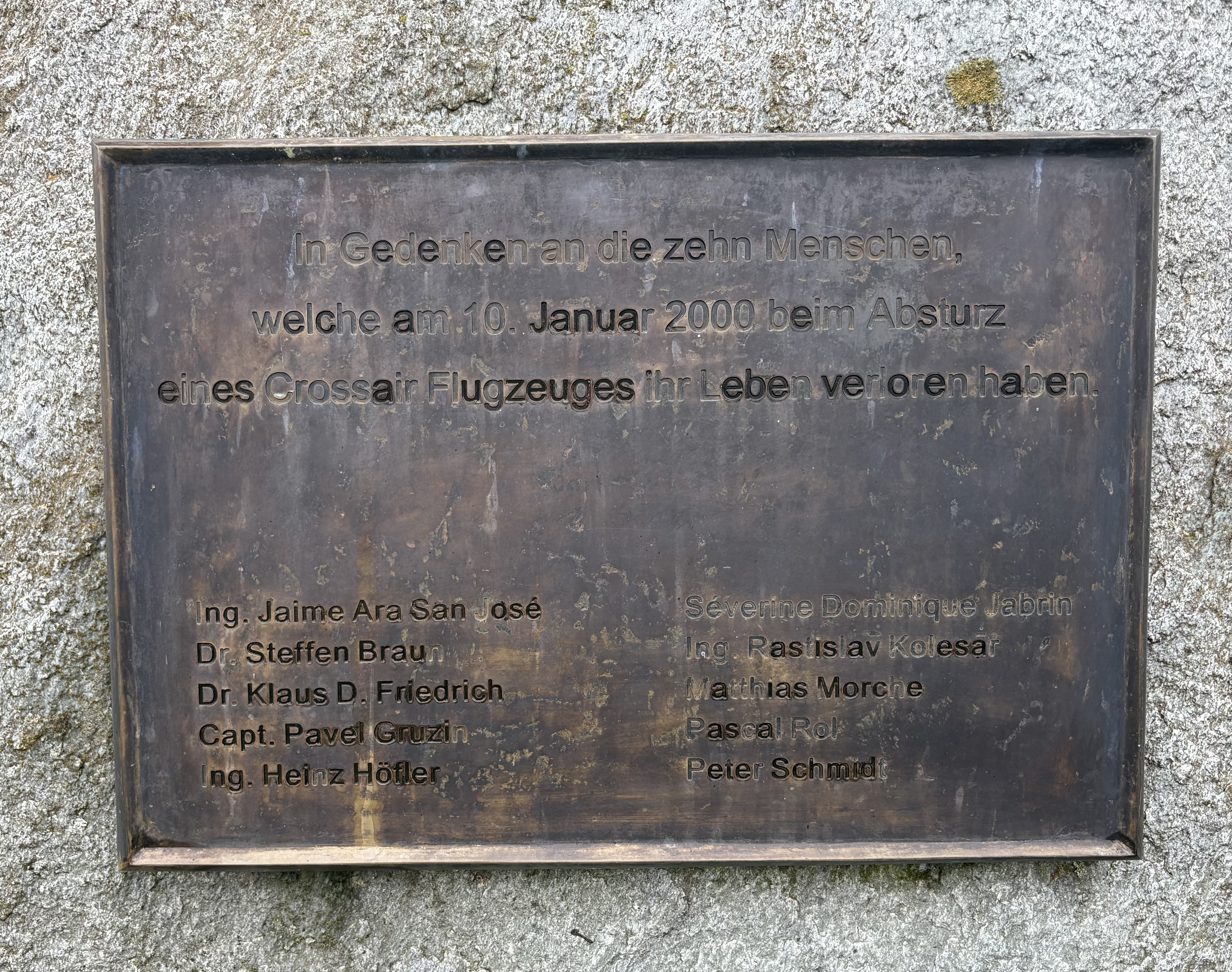
The plaque on the memorial

Four of the passengers were Germans, while the other three passengers were French, Swiss, and Spanish.

Final tally of passenger nationalities
Nationality	Passengers	Crew	Total
Germany	4	0	4
France	1	1	2
Switzerland	1	0	1
Spain	1	0	1
Moldova	0	1	1
Slovakia	0	1	1
Total	7	3	10

== Investigation ==
Pack of Phenazepam, found in Moldovan pilot Pavel Gruzin's crew bag.

=== Background ===
The crash came about in the midst of a bitter labor-management dispute between Crossair and its pilots over a possible pay raise and work rules changes. The pilots' union had just canceled pay agreements with Crossair in December 1999, with a termination effective in summer 2000. In addition, and prior to the accident, two Crossair pilots told Swiss media that some foreign pilots employed by Crossair posed a safety risk because of an insufficient knowledge of English. These two pilots were fired by Crossair, but were then elected to head the pilots' union, "Crossair Cockpit Personnel (CCP)". An investigation of the accident later revealed that the pilot Gruzin and copilot Kolesár were only able to communicate with each other in English, but Gruzin's ability to speak English was too limited to hold more than a basic conversation.

After the crash, both Crossair and CCP, including the pilots who had previously spoken to the media and been fired, publicly stated that the coincidence between the accident and the dispute was very unfortunate and that reports about pilot error being involved in the crash were speculation, although this conclusion was later established to be the probable cause of the accident.

An examination of pilot Pavel Gruzin's body revealed traces of the drug phenazepam, a benzodiazepine-class sedative in his muscle tissue. Investigators also found an open packet of the Russian-made drug in baggage belonging to Gruzin.

=== Causes ===
According to the Investigation Report of the Swiss Aircraft Accident Investigation Bureau (AAIB), the accident was attributable to the flight crew losing control of the aircraft for the following reasons:

- The flight crew reacted inappropriately when departure clearance was given by air traffic control.
- The co-pilot made an entry without being instructed to do so by the commander, which related to the change to the SID ZUE 1 standard instrument departure. In doing so, he omitted selection of a turn direction.
- The commander dispensed with use of the autopilot under instrument flight conditions and during the work-intensive climb phase of the flight.
- The commander took the aircraft into a spiral dive to the right because, with a probability bordering on certainty, he had lost spatial orientation.
- The first officer took only inadequate measures to prevent or recover from the spiral dive.

According to this same Investigation Report, the following factors may have contributed to the accident:

- The commander remained unilaterally firm in perceptions which suggested a left turn direction to him.
- When interpreting the attitude display instruments under stress, the commander resorted to a reaction pattern (heuristics) which he had learned earlier.
- The commander's capacity for analysis and critical assessment of the situation were possibly limited as a result of the effects of the benzodiazepine drug phenazepam found in his muscle tissue.
- After the change to standard instrument departure SID ZUE 1Y the crew set inappropriate priorities for their tasks and their concentration remained one-sided.
- The commander was not systematically acquainted by Crossair with the specific features of western systems and cockpit procedures.

The investigation did look at the possibility of electromagnetic interference and tested a similar aircraft using mobile phones. It concluded that there were "no indications that aircraft systems were negatively affected by electromagnetic interference (EMI)".

== Dramatization ==
The crash was featured in "Lost in Translation", a season 13 (2013–14) episode of the Canadian TV series Mayday (called Air Emergency and Air Disasters in the United States and Air Crash Investigation in the UK and elsewhere around the world).

== See also ==
- Aeroflot Flight 821
- Indonesia AirAsia Flight 8501
- West Air Sweden Flight 294
- TAROM Flight 371
- Flash Airlines Flight 604
