= Crossair =

Regional airline of Switzerland (1975–2002)

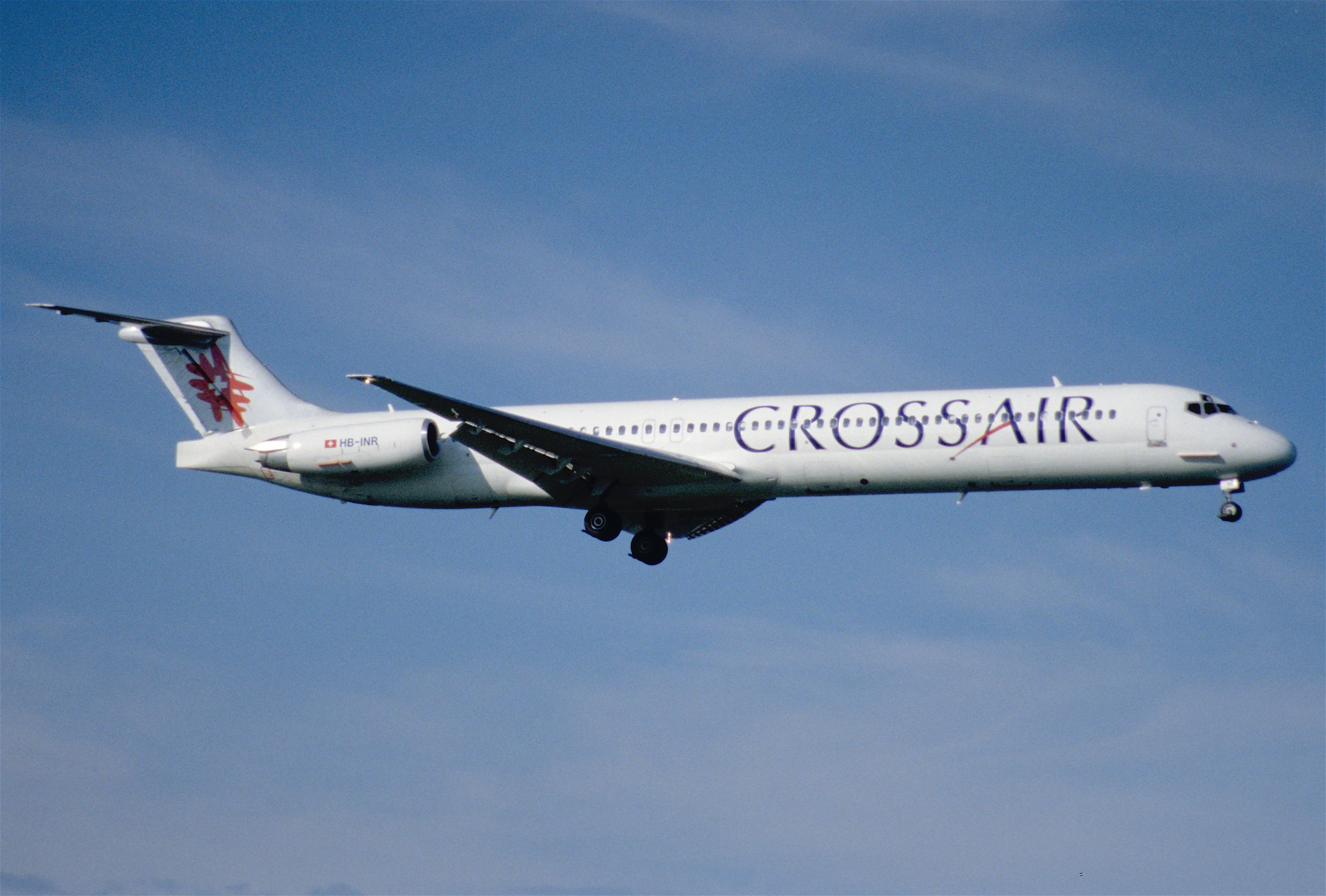
- An MD-82 of Crossair
IATA	ICAO	Call sign
LX	CRX	CROSSAIR
- Founded: 14 February 1975; 51 years ago (as Business Flyers Basel AG)
- Commenced operations: 18 November 1978; 47 years ago (as Crossair)
- Ceased operations: 31 March 2002; 24 years ago (re-organized as SWISS)
- Hubs: EuroAirport Basel Mulhouse Freiburg
- Frequent-flyer program: Qualiflyer
- Subsidiaries: Crossair Europe (1997–2002)
- Fleet size: 81 (March 2002)
- Parent company: SAirGroup
- Headquarters: Saint-Louis, Haut-Rhin, France
- Key people: André Dosé – Head of Crossair (2001–2002)
- Founder: Moritz Suter
- Website: Crossair.com

Crossair Ltd. Co. for Regional European Air Transport (German: Crossair AG für europäischen Regionalluftverkehr) was a Swiss regional airline headquartered on the grounds of EuroAirport Basel Mulhouse Freiburg in Saint-Louis, Haut-Rhin, France, near Basel, Switzerland.

After taking over most of the assets of Swissair following that airline's bankruptcy in 2002, Crossair was restructured to become SWISS.

== History ==
Moritz Suter founded the airline in February 1975 as a private company under the name Business Flyers Basel AG. The company operated under this initial name for several years before undergoing a significant change on November 18, 1978, the name was officially changed to Crossair. Scheduled services began shortly thereafter, on July 2, 1979, with flights connecting Zürich to Nuremberg, Innsbruck, and Klagenfurt.

As the new decade began, Crossair committed to fleet expansion, placing an order in 1980 for ten Saab 340 aircraft. The first of these, registered HB-AHA, was delivered on June 6, 1984, and entered service soon after on June 15, flying between Basel and Paris Charles de Gaulle. Notably, Pope John Paul II was one of the dignitaries on this inaugural flight. In 1994, Crossair continued its partnership with Saab by becoming a launch customer for the Saab 2000, a high-speed turboprop the airline affectionately nicknamed "Concordio." This was a pivotal aircraft for the company, which would ultimately operate 34 of them before its closure, taking delivery of the final manufactured Saab 2000 in 1999. The Saab 2000 fleet also supported Crossair's cargo partnership operations with DHL and FedEx.

In 1992, Crossair were a founder member of the Qualiflyer frequent flyer scheme alongside Swissair and Austrian Airlines. A change in ownership structure occurred in 1995. Swissair, Crossair's then-parent company, acquired a two-thirds majority stake in the airline as part of the financing agreement for Crossair's purchase of 12 Avro RJ100 jets, with a further 12 options.. At this time, Swissair outsourced its regional flight operations to Crossair, alongside absorbing loss-making charter flights of Balair which had recently merged with Compagnie de Transport Aérien.

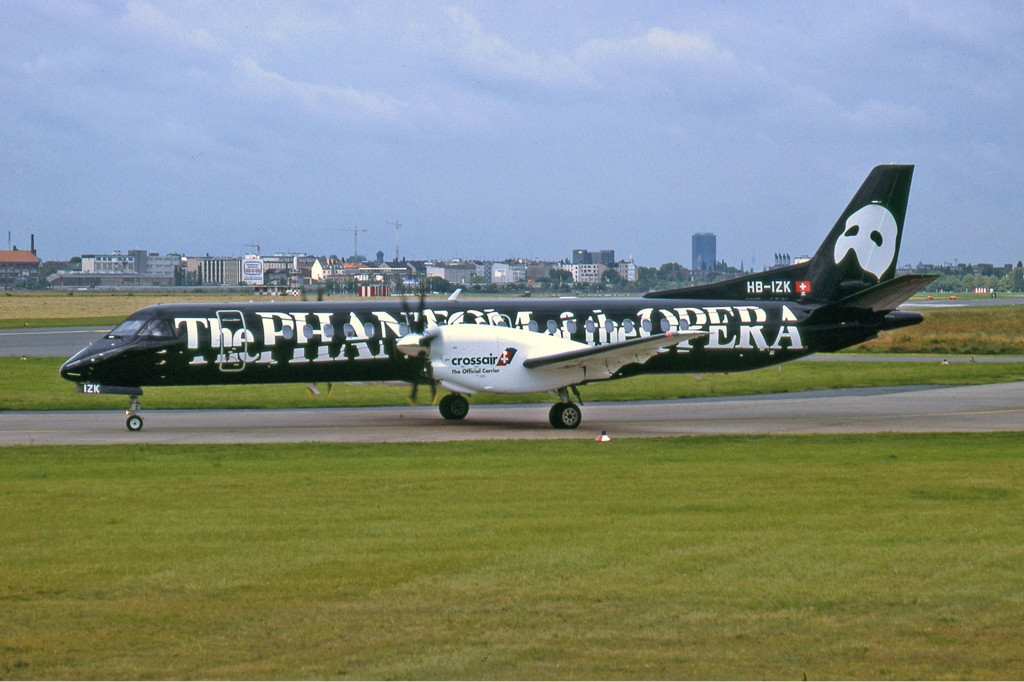
The Phantom of the Opera livery in July 1995

Throughout the mid-1990s, Crossair distinguished itself through creative marketing, including unique aircraft liveries. In 1995, the airline teamed up with Andrew Lloyd Webber and The Phantom of the Opera to create a unique livery celebrating the musical's opening in Basel. Crossair also worked with McDonald's to create the famous "McPlane," a distinctively red aircraft featuring the iconic logos that even served McDonald's food onboard. As the airline progressed into 1998, they launched Crossair Europe, operating flights from the French side of EuroAirport to circumvent challenges of European Union restrictions on Swiss air traffic and routes.

Seeking further fleet modernization, Crossair assessed an order to become a launch customer for the new Fairchild Dornier 728JET. However, the airline later decided against this purchase, instead canceling the orders and opting to buy Embraer's new ERJ170 jet. Embraer later explored the development of a shortened version of the E170 specifically tailored for Crossair's needs.

In 2000, Crossair suffered their first major accident when Flight 498 crashed minutes after takeoff from Zurich airport. The crash came in the midst of a bitter labor-management dispute between Crossair and its pilots over a possible pay raise and work rules changes. The pilots' union had just canceled pay agreements with Crossair in December 1999, with a termination effective in summer 2000. In addition, and prior to the accident, two Crossair pilots told Swiss media that some foreign pilots employed by Crossair posed a safety risk because of an insufficient knowledge of English. These two pilots were fired by Crossair, but were then elected to head the pilots' union, "Crossair Cockpit Personnel (CCP)". An investigation of the accident later revealed that the pilot of Flight 498 Pavel Gruzin and copilot Rastislav Kolesár were only able to communicate with each other in English, but Gruzin's ability to speak English was too limited to hold more than a basic conversation. In October 2000, a Crossair aircraft at Luxembourg Airport was attacked by two men armed with Kalashnikov assault rifles in an attempted robbery of bank notes being loaded onto the plane. The pilot was completing an external safety inspection of the aircraft at the time, with no passengers onboard the aircraft. Police were involved in an exchange of gunfire leaving six people injured. The incidents coincided with the airlines first significant financial loss since 1992, of $3.5 million.

By 2001, Swissair's stake in the regional airline had increased to 70%. However, this year also marked the start of the final chapter for both companies. After parent company SAirGroup filed for a debt restructuring moratorium in October 2001, an overhaul of the entire operation became unavoidable. Suter, remaining as CEO, called the alliance with Swissair through Qualiflyer into question suggesting his airline may break-away from the group. A month later, a second fatal crash for Crossair occurred when Flight 3597 crashed in a wooded area near Bassersdorf whilst on final approach to Zurich airport. The Swiss Aircraft Accident Investigation Bureau (AAIB). The AAIB would conclude that the accident was a controlled flight into terrain (CFIT) caused by a series of pilot errors and navigation mistakes that led the plane off-course. Of the 33 occupants, 9 survived including Swiss politician Jacqueline Badran. Among the 24 people that lost their lives in the accident were Melanie Thornton, the former lead singer of the German Eurodance duo La Bouche, and singers Nathaly van het Ende and Maria Serrano Serrano of the German-Dutch Eurodance trio Passion Fruit; the group's third singer, Debby St. Maarten did survive the accident, albeit with significant injuries. The head of Crossair at the time, André Dosé, confirmed the families of those affected would receive compensation of 30,000 CHF. Several years later, seven executives of the former airline were charged for their actions concerning the Flight 3597. After legal proceedings, the defendants were acquitted in 2008. The Swiss federal prosecutor did not appeal the decision. André Dosé and Moritz Suter were awarded a combined compensation settlement of 200,000 CHF whilst four managers were awarded 100,000 CHF each.

During the ensuing chaos of late 2001, Crossair was pulled into a legal battle with Air Liberté, a former Swissair-owned subsidiary. This dispute resulted in the impounding of a Crossair Embraer 145 aircraft in Nice, though Crossair denied liability for Swissair’s debts. Despite these legal and financial hurdles, Crossair became the vehicle for the "Phoenix" plan to revive a national Swiss airline, with the Canton of Zurich voting to inject 300million CHF into the new project. On March 31, 2002, Swissair ceased all operations. Crossair subsequently absorbed most of Swissair's assets, underwent a comprehensive restructuring, and was officially rebranded to become Swiss International Air Lines.

== Head office ==
In the early 1980s, Crossair was based at Zurich Airport in Kloten. However, as the organisation grew it opened a training centre at EuroAirport Basel-Mulhouse-Freiburg in 1983, before undertaking construction of a new head office at the airport in 1989. This would become the airlines headquarters until 2002, when it became the head office for Swiss International Airlines.

== Destinations ==
Crossair designed its entire route network around a sophisticated multi-hub business plan, operating primarily from bases in Basel, Bern, Geneva, Lugano, and Zürich. The airline was intensely focused on serving smaller regional airports and efficiently connecting that traffic to larger international airports. This strategy began at the launch of scheduled service on July 2, 1979, with flights immediately connecting Zürich to the German and Austrian cities of Nuremberg, Innsbruck, and Klagenfurt. The domestic network was crucial, with the airline also maintaining essential internal links, such as flights between Lugano and Geneva via Basel.

A core component of this strategy was the innovative Eurocross scheme operating from the Basel base. This system was set up to serve smaller airports and ensure passengers could transfer quickly, with short transfer times, onto onward flights with partner airlines from larger hubs like Zürich. As the network matured, specific routes grew, including the 1984 service linking Basel to Paris Charles de Gaulle. Later in the airline’s history, new flights were added to Nice, Gothenburg, Manchester and Leipzig. Crossair also utilised an MD-11 aircraft in the summer of 1997 to service weekly flights to Palma de Mallorca.

To significantly extend its reach across Europe, Crossair cultivated strategic partnerships and feeder agreements. On a regional level, the airline maintained alliances with carriers such as Air Europe, Air Littoral, and Tyrolean Airways. Crucially, Crossair developed extensive codeshare and interlining agreements with major flag carriers, integrating its regional network into their global operations. These key partners included Austrian Airlines, Air France, British Airways and TAP Air Portugal, solidifying Crossair's role as a high-quality feeder airline for global traffic. The relationship with Swissair also yielded a number of Crossair operated flights beyond Europe, such as the transatlantic Basel to Newark flight.

== Fleet ==
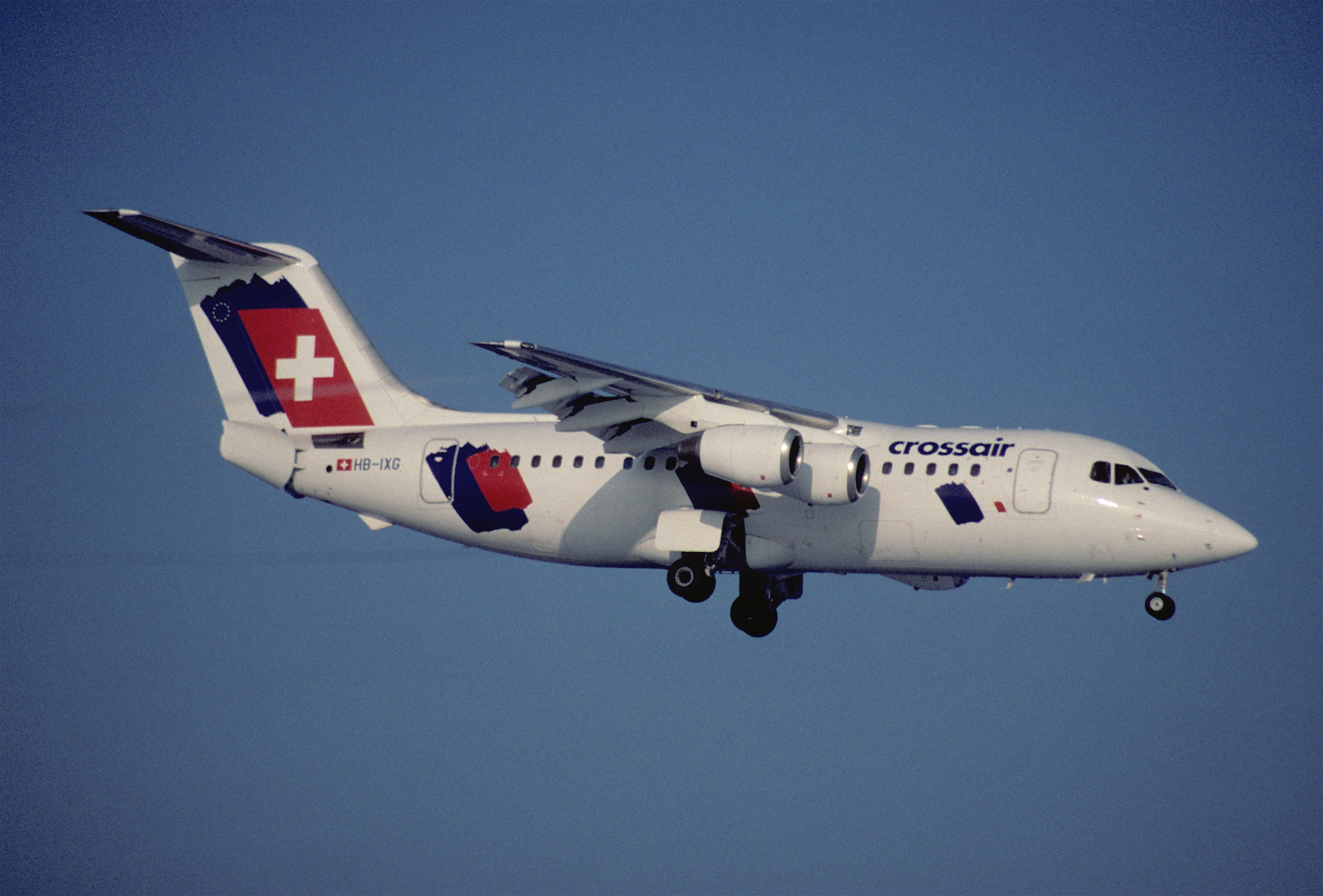
Crossair Avro RJ85

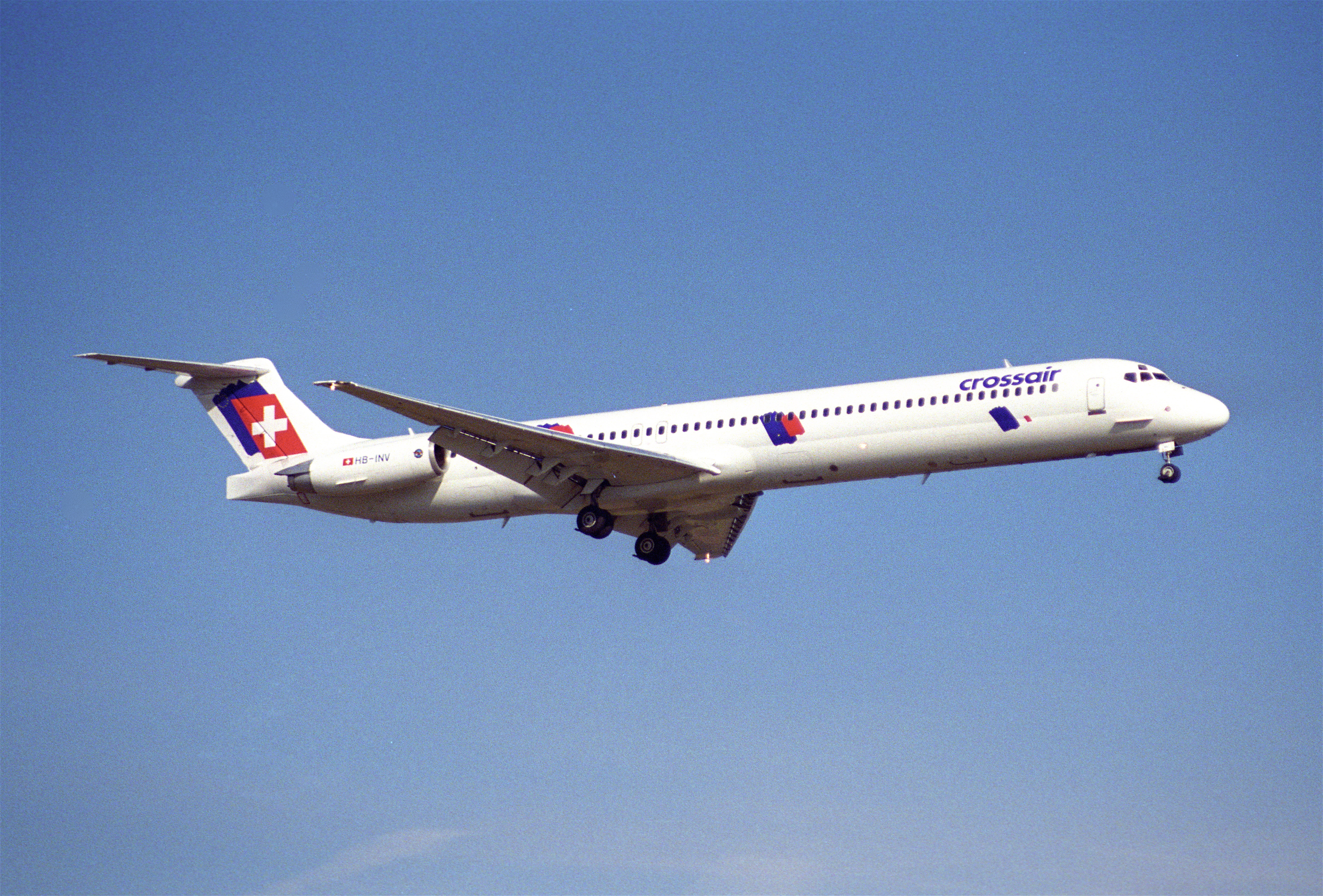
Crossair McDonnell Douglas MD-82

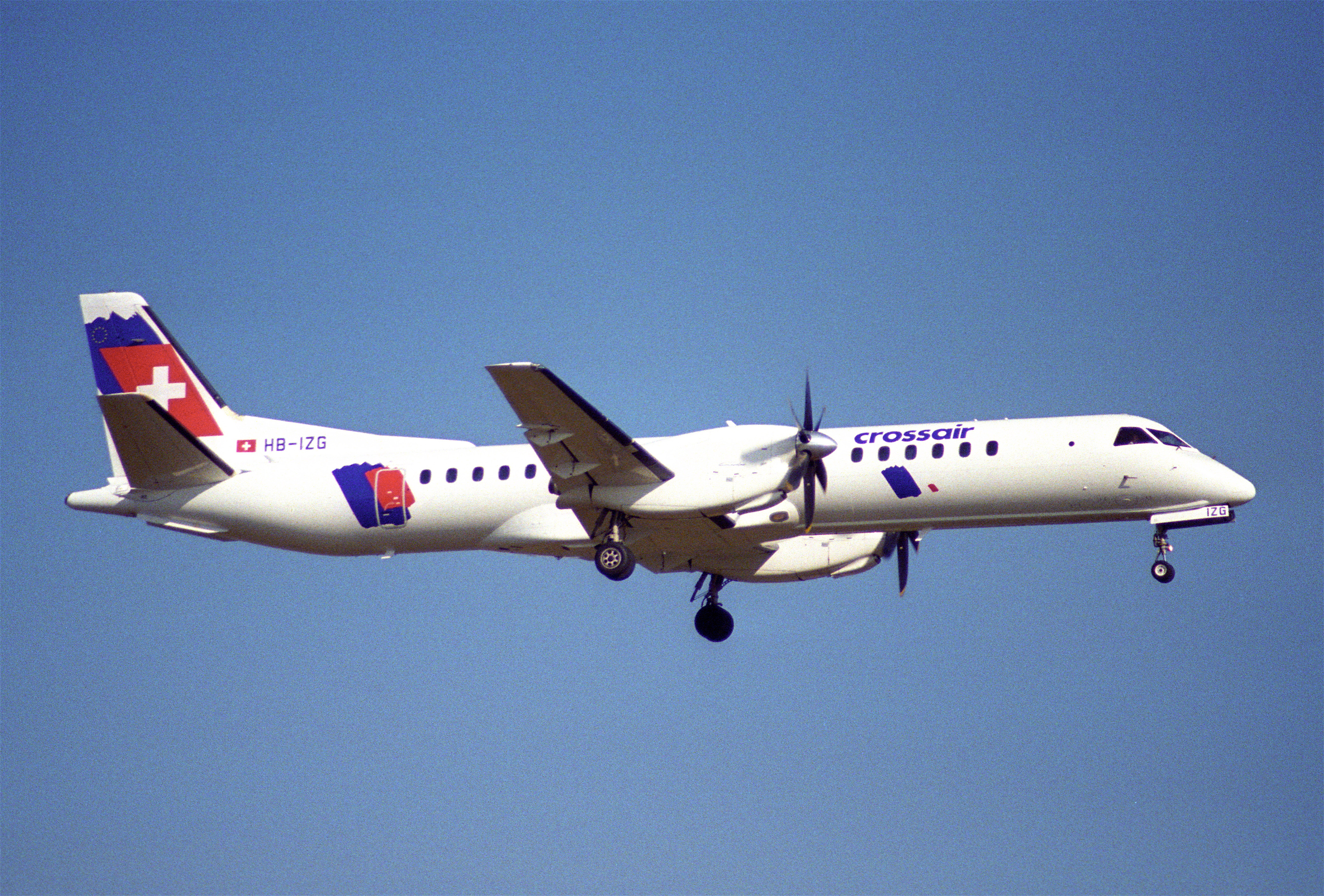
Crossair Saab 2000

Crossair has operated the following aircraft throughout its existence:

Crossair fleet
Aircraft	Total	Introduced	Retired	Notes
Avro RJ85	4	1993	2002	Transferred to Swiss International Air Lines.
Avro RJ100	16	1995	2002	Transferred to Swiss International Air Lines. One crashed as Flight 3597.
British Aerospace 146-200A	3	1990	1994	
British Aerospace 146-300	2	1991	1996	
Cessna T210	1	1976	Unknown	
Cessna 310P	1	1976	Unknown	
Cessna 320C	1	1975	Unknown	
Cessna 421B	1	1976	Unknown	
Cessna 550	1	1976	Unknown	
Cessna 551	1	1977	1982	
Embraer ERJ-145LU	22	2000	2002	Transferred to Swiss International Air Lines.
Fairchild Hiller FH-227	1	1984	1984	Leased from Delta Air Transport.
Fairchild Swearingen Metro II	3	1979	1983	
Fairchild Swearingen Metro III	9	1981	1990	
Fokker F27 Friendship	2	1984	1984	
Fokker 50	5	1990	1995	
McDonnell Douglas DC-9-14	1	1995	1995	Leased from ALG Aeroleasing
McDonnell Douglas MD-82	1	1995	2001	Transferred to Nordic Airlink.
McDonnell Douglas MD-83	11	1995	2002	
Piper L-4J	1	1975	2001	
Saab 340	14	1984	2002	One crashed as Flight 498.
Saab 2000	32	1994	2002	Largest operator. One written off as Flight 850.

== Accidents and incidents ==
- 21 February 1990: The undercarriage was accidentally retracted on a Crossair Saab 340A, registration HB-AHA, on the apron at Zürich Airport. No fatalities, aircraft destroyed. The captain involved (Hans Ulrich Lutz) was killed in Crossair Flight 3597 in 2001.
- 10 January 2000: Crossair Flight 498 crashed just after take-off from Zürich. All 10 people aboard were killed.
- 9 October 2000: Crossair flight SR 3879 was involved in an attempted bank note cargo robbery by armed assailants at Luxembourg Airport. There were no passengers onboard the aircraft at the time.
- 19 December 2000: A Crossair Saab 2000 slid off the runway at Dresden Airport during takeoff due to a burst tire. All 18 passengers and 4 crew survived unharmed.
- 24 November 2001: Crossair Flight 3597 crashed near Zürich, killing 24 of 33 people aboard, including the former La Bouche lead singer Melanie Thornton and two of the three members of the German Eurodance group Passion Fruit. The third member, Debby St. Maarten, sustained serious injuries but survived.
- 24 December 2001: A Crossair Avro-RJ85 slid off the runway during a snowstorm on arrival at Sarajevo Airport. All 88 onboard survived unharmed.

== See also ==
- Crossair Europe
- Swissair
