= EuroAirport Basel–Mulhouse–Freiburg =

Binational airport in France near the Swiss and German borders

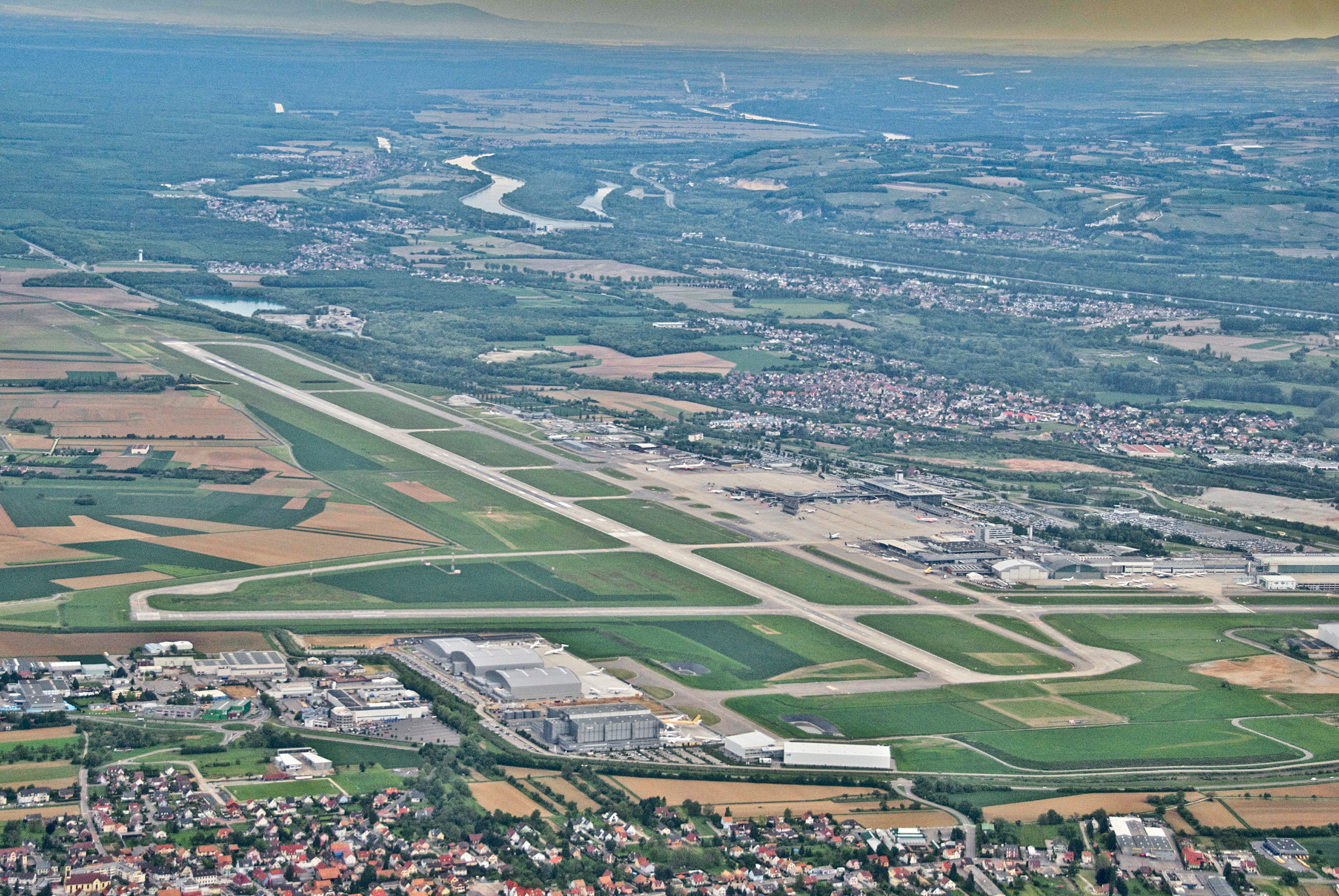
- IATA: BSL, MLH, EAP; ICAO: LFSB

Summary
- Airport type: International
- Owner: France and Swiss canton of Basel-City
- Operator: L'administration de l'Aéroport de Bâle-Mulhouse
- Serves: Basel, Switzerland; Mulhouse, France; Freiburg im Breisgau, Germany
- Location: Saint-Louis, France
- Opened: 8 May 1946; 80 years ago
- Operating base for: easyJet Switzerland
- Elevation AMSL: 270 m (890 ft)
- Coordinates: 47°35′24″N 007°31′45″E
- Website: www.euroairport.com

Map
- Location of airport in Alsace region Location of airport in France Location of airport near Switzerland Location of airport near Germany BSL, MLH, EAP/LFSB (Europe)

Runways
Direction	Length		Surface
Direction	m	ft	Surface
15/33	3,900	12,795	Concrete
07/25	1,820	5,971	Concrete

Statistics (2024)
- Passengers: 8,900,000
- Cargo (tons): 104,800
- Aircraft movements: 94,124
- Sources: French AIP, airport's annual report and French AIP at EUROCONTROL

Basel–Mulhouse International Airport (French: Aéroport de Bâle-Mulhouse), commercially known as EuroAirport Basel–Mulhouse–Freiburg (IATA: BSL, MLH, EAP, ICAO: LFSB) (Note: IATA airport 3-letter codes for the Swiss area, the French area, and the metropolitan area) or simply EuroAirport, is a Franco-Swiss international airport located in France, in the administrative commune of Saint-Louis, Hésingue, and Blotzheim, in the French Alsace part of the Trinational Eurodistrict of Basel. It is 4.7 km (2.9 mi) west of the tripoint of France, Germany, and Switzerland, 3.5 km (2.2 mi) northwest of the city of Basel in Switzerland, 20 km (12 mi) southeast of Mulhouse in France, and 46 km (29 mi) south-southwest of Freiburg im Breisgau in Germany. The airport is jointly administered by France and Switzerland, governed by a 1949 international convention. It is the only binational airport in the world. The airport serves as a base for easyJet Switzerland and mainly features flights to European metropolitan and leisure destinations.

== History ==
=== Foundation and early years ===
Plans for the construction of a joint Swiss–French airport started in the 1930s but were halted by the Second World War. Swiss planners identified Basel as one of the four cities for which a main urban airport would be developed and recognized that the existing airfield at Sternenfeld in Birsfelden was too small and, due to the development of the adjacent river port facilities, unsuitable for expansion. The suburb of Allschwil was proposed for a new airport, although this would require construction on both sides of the Franco-Swiss border; this led to talks with French authorities centred on developing a single airport that would serve both countries, enhancing its international airport status.

The first enlargement project was approved by referendum in Basel in 1960 and, over the following decades, the terminals and runways were continually extended. The north–south runway was extended further to 3,900 m (12,800 ft) in 1972. In 1984, an annual total of 1 million passengers was reached. In 1987, the trademark name EuroAirport Basel–Mulhouse–Freiburg was introduced.

In December 1998, Swissair inaugurated service to New York-Newark using Airbus A310s. The main reason it launched the route was that it had heard another carrier was planning to begin flights from Basel to Newark; Swissair wanted to start flying the route before the other airline did. The company also hoped to attract people working for the pharmaceutical companies in Basel. Crossair, a subsidiary of Swissair, code-shared on the flight. The carrier operated a hub at the EuroAirport, from which it flew to 40 regional destinations.

=== Development in the 2000s ===
Swissair terminated the flight to Newark in March 2000, saying it suffered from low occupancy. The local newspaper bz Basel commented that the airline did not advertise it well.

From 2007 until 2009, Ryanair also flew to the airport for the first time. However, as a result of a dispute over landing fees, the airline ceased operations on all of its eight routes. More recently Ryanair announced it would return in April 2014, with the resumption of the Basel–Dublin route as well as a short-lived revival of the Basel – London–Stansted route. Ryanair added a Basel-Zagreb route in December 2021.

In May 2008, Air Transat commenced seasonal service to Montreal. The airline flew an Airbus A310 on the route. In December 2014, Swiss International Air Lines announced it would cease all operations at Basel by 31 May 2015 due to heavy competition from low-cost carriers. Swiss faced direct competition on five out of its six Basel routes, all of which were operated by Swiss Global Air Lines. The Lufthansa Group announced it would set up Eurowings' first base outside Germany at the EuroAirport as a replacement. However these plans were later cancelled in favour of Vienna Airport.

In January 2017, the removal of Basel-Mulhouse from the networks of Air Berlin and its Swiss subsidiary Belair was announced.

The airport is advancing major infrastructure upgrades, including its first onsite hotel project, recent runway refurbishments, a planned €130 million terminal expansion, and a future direct railway link targeted for service by 2034/2035.

== International status ==
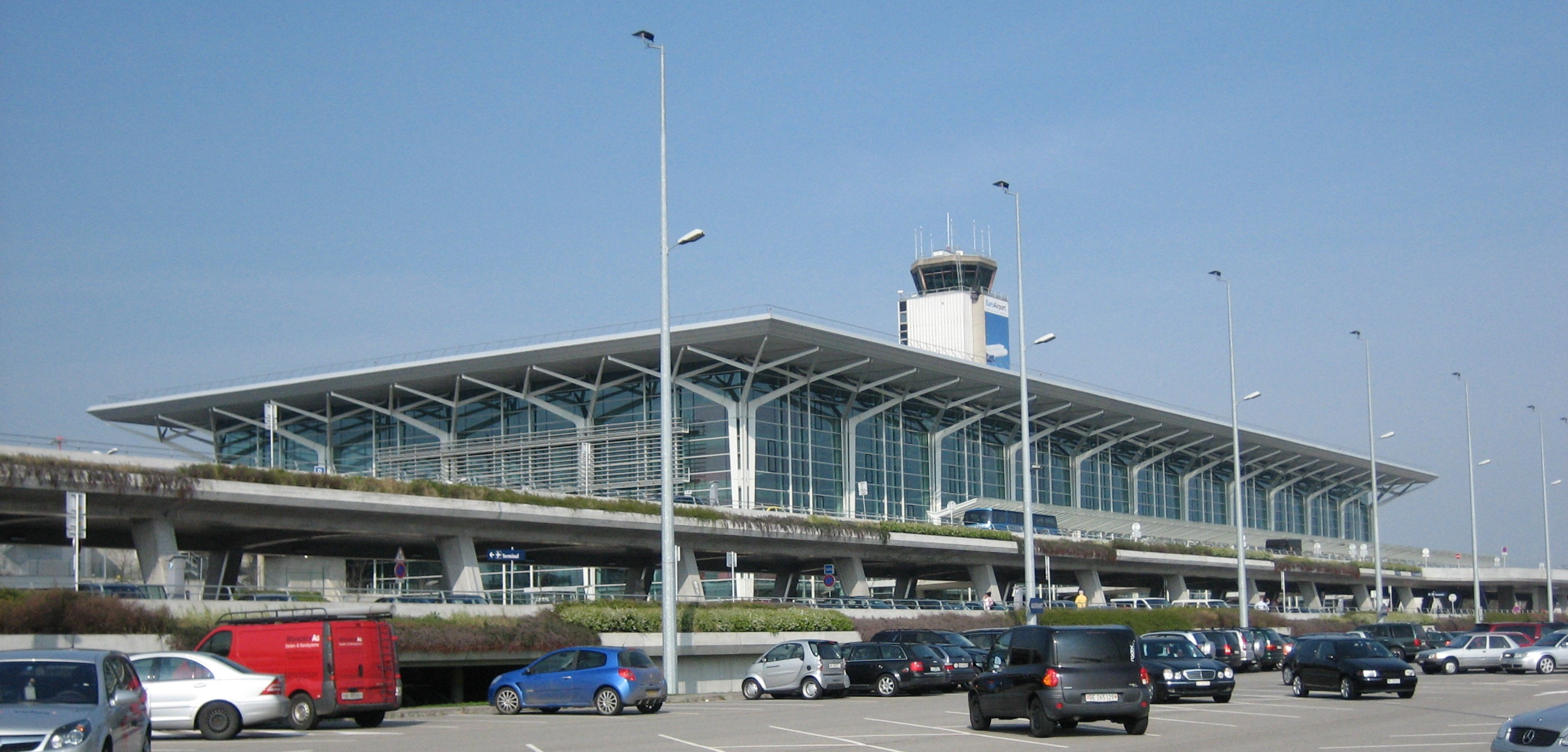
Terminal exterior

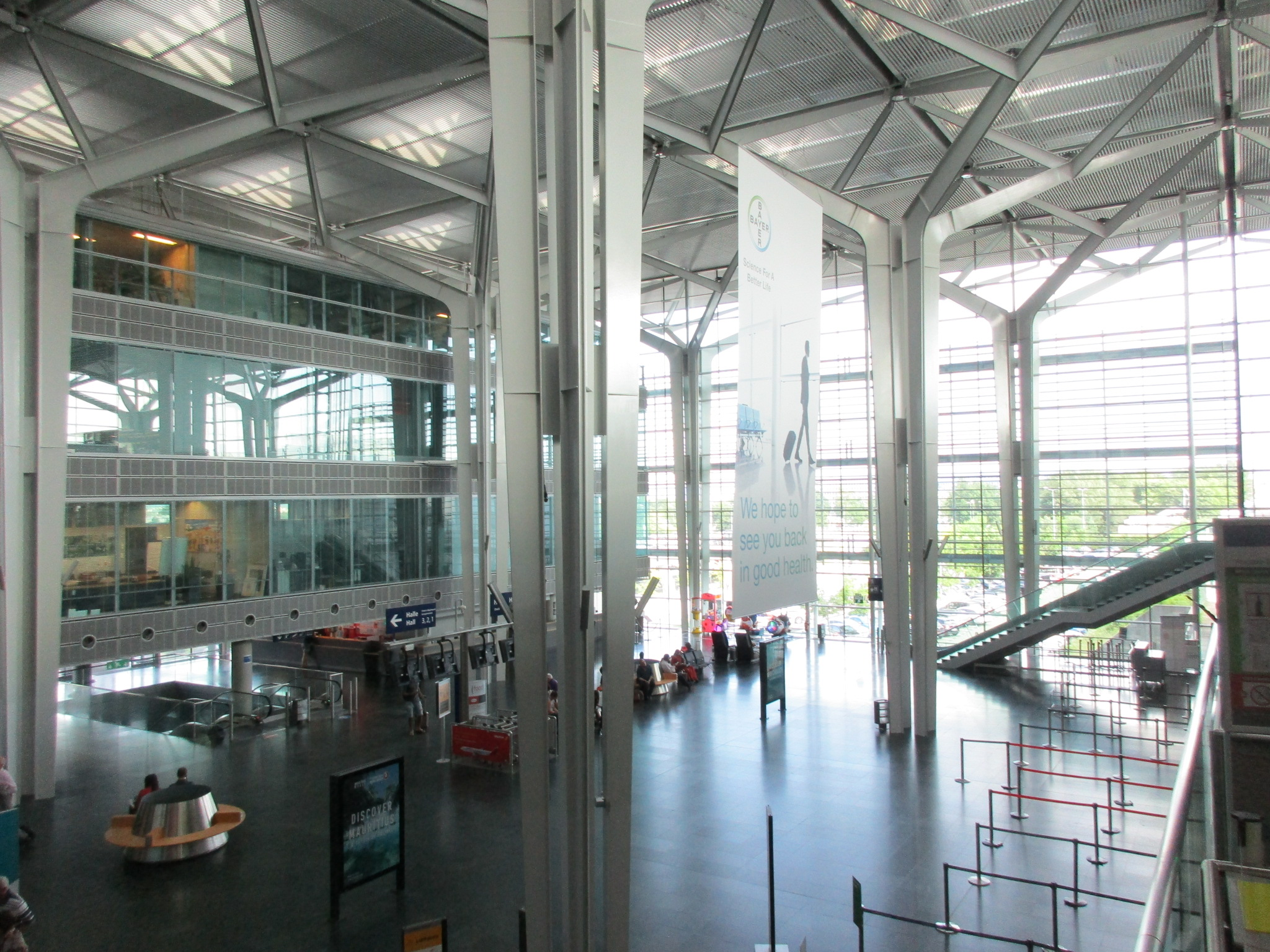
Terminal interior

EuroAirport is one of the few airports in the world operated jointly by two countries, in this case France and Switzerland. It is governed by a 1949 international convention. The headquarters of the airport's operations are located in Blotzheim, France. The airport is located completely on French soil; it also has a Swiss customs border and is connected to Basel by a 2.5-kilometre (1.6 mi) long customs-free road, allowing air travellers access into Switzerland without undergoing a French customs check. The airport is operated via a state treaty established in 1946 wherein the two countries (Switzerland and France) are granted access to the airport without any customs or other border restrictions. The airport's board has eight members each from France and Switzerland and two advisers from Germany.

The airport building is split into two separate sections: Swiss and French. Though the entire airport is on French soil and under French jurisdiction, the Swiss authorities have the authority to apply Swiss laws regarding customs, medical services and police work in the Swiss section, including the road to Basel. French police are allowed to execute random checks in the Swiss section as well. With Switzerland joining the Schengen Treaty in March 2009, the air side was rearranged to include a Schengen and non-Schengen zone. As border control is staffed by both Swiss and French border officers, passengers arriving from non-Schengen countries must approach the customs office of the country for which they have received the Schengen entry visa, which is either France or Switzerland.

Due to its international status, EuroAirport has three IATA airport codes: BSL (Basel) is the Swiss code, MLH (Mulhouse) is the French code. EAP (EuroAirport) is the code for the "Metropolitan Area Basel". Some booking systems show different ticket prices for flights to BSL and MLH, as one of them can be a domestic flight within France (with different rules on fuel taxation, etc.), and in some cases, tickets can be issued where a "flight" between BSL and MLH is shown on the itinerary. The airport's ICAO airport code is LFSB. LSZM, the old code, has been reassigned to the airfield of Mollis.

In 2020, a French court decided that job contracts on the airport are governed by French labor laws, not Swiss ones. Basing on a 2012 agreement, the Swiss companies active on the airport have used Swiss labor regulations, which are more employer-friendly than the French ones. In exchange, working under Swiss laws results in much higher wages.

== Terminal ==
The EuroAirport consists of a single terminal building, a brick-style main area with four levels and the Y-shaped gate area attached to it. The basement (Level 1) contains the access to the car park, the ground level (Level 2) features the arrivals facilities. Level 3 is the check-in area divided into halls 1–4 while the departure gates are located at Level 4. The gate area features gates 1–2, 20–46, 60–61 and 78–87 of which gates 22–32 are used for non-Schengen flights. Six of the boarding gates feature jet bridges, the others are used for walk- or bus-boarding. The entry and exit area is divided into French and Swiss parts.

== Airlines and destinations ==
=== Passenger ===
The following airlines offer regular scheduled and charter flights at the EuroAirport:

Airlines	Destinations
Aegean Airlines	Athens
Air Algérie	Algiers
Air Arabia	Casablanca
Air Cairo	Seasonal: Hurghada
Air Canada	Seasonal: Montréal–Trudeau (begins 16 June 2027)
Air Dolomiti	Frankfurt
Air France	Paris–Charles de Gaulle
Air Transat	Seasonal: Montréal–Trudeau
AJet	Istanbul–Sabiha Gökçen; Seasonal: Bodrum
arkia	Tel Aviv
ASL Airlines France	Seasonal: Algiers, Constantine, Oran
British Airways	London–Heathrow
Chair Airlines	Pristina
Condor	Seasonal: Palma de Mallorca
Corendon Airlines	Seasonal: Antalya
Cyprus Airways	Seasonal: Larnaca
easyJet	Alicante, Amsterdam, Athens, Barcelona, Berlin, Bordeaux, Brindisi, Bristol, Budapest, Catania, Copenhagen, Edinburgh, Enfidha, Faro, Funchal, Gran Canaria, Hamburg, Lisbon, London–Gatwick, London–Luton, Madrid, Málaga, Manchester, Marrakesh, Montpellier, Nantes, Naples, Nice, Palma de Mallorca, Porto, Prague, Pristina, Rome–Fiumicino, Santiago de Compostela, Sarajevo (begins 10 May 2027), Seville, Tel Aviv, Toulouse, Valencia; Seasonal: Agadir, Ajaccio, Antalya, Bari, Bastia, Biarritz, Bilbao, Cagliari, Calvi, Chania, Djerba, Dubrovnik, Figari, Heraklion, Hurghada, Ibiza, Kraków, La Palma, Lamezia Terme, Larnaca, Lille, Malta, Menorca, Olbia, Palermo, Pula, Reykjavík–Keflavík, Rhodes, Rimini, Skiathos, Split, Thessaloniki, Tivat (begins 30 June 2027), Venice, Vienna, Zadar
Eurowings	Seasonal: Palma de Mallorca
flydubai	Dubai–International
FlyLili	Seasonal charter: Tel Aviv
Israir	Tel Aviv
KLM	Amsterdam
Lufthansa	Frankfurt, Munich
Nesma Airlines	Hurghada
Norwegian Air Shuttle	Seasonal: Copenhagen, Oslo
Nouvelair	Tunis; Seasonal: Djerba
Pegasus Airlines	Istanbul–Sabiha Gökçen; Seasonal: Ankara, Antalya
Ryanair	Dublin, London–Stansted, Zagreb
Sundor	Seasonal: Tel Aviv
SunExpress	Antalya; Seasonal: Izmir, Kayseri
Turkish Airlines	Istanbul
Vueling	Barcelona
Wizz Air	Belgrade, Bratislava, Bucharest–Băneasa, Budapest, Cluj-Napoca, Iași, Kraków, Naples (begins 2 March 2027), Niš, Ohrid, Podgorica, Poznań, Pristina, Sibiu, Skopje, Sofia, Târgu Mureș, Timișoara, Tirana, Tuzla, Warsaw–Chopin, Wrocław, Yerevan (begins 18 December 2026)

=== Cargo ===
Airlines	Destinations
Korean Air Cargo	Seoul–Incheon, Vienna
Qatar Airways Cargo	Doha

== Statistics ==
Busiest routes by passenger numbers
Rank	Airport	2023	2022	2021	2020	2019	2018	2017	2016
1	Pristina	284,309	253,805	201,715	103,806	158,867	138,668	115,066	105,338
2	Amsterdam	178,776	137,704	50,288	56,954	222,480	219,746	210,215	206,986
3	Istanbul–Sabiha Gökçen	157,419	123,097	77,204	47,625	103,528	87,709	78,588	70,338
4	Barcelona	134,424	126,305	55,043	33,727	177,693	179,538	173,414	170,492
5	Palma de Mallorca	134,345	121,081	74,794	26,692	153,240	172,534	182,496	155,949
6	London–Heathrow	134,225	85,406	7,228	28,202	140,676	140,289	129,091	126,362
7	Antalya	116,426	102,593	41,213	28,639	75,789			
8	Budapest	112,128	102,377	37,241	32,234	124,652	89,290		
9	Porto	107,450	101,608	65,625	54,460	108,173	108,106	106,307	103,998
10	London–Gatwick	102,422	110,952	14,213	33,326	143,672	141,380	138,051	135,895

== Other facilities ==
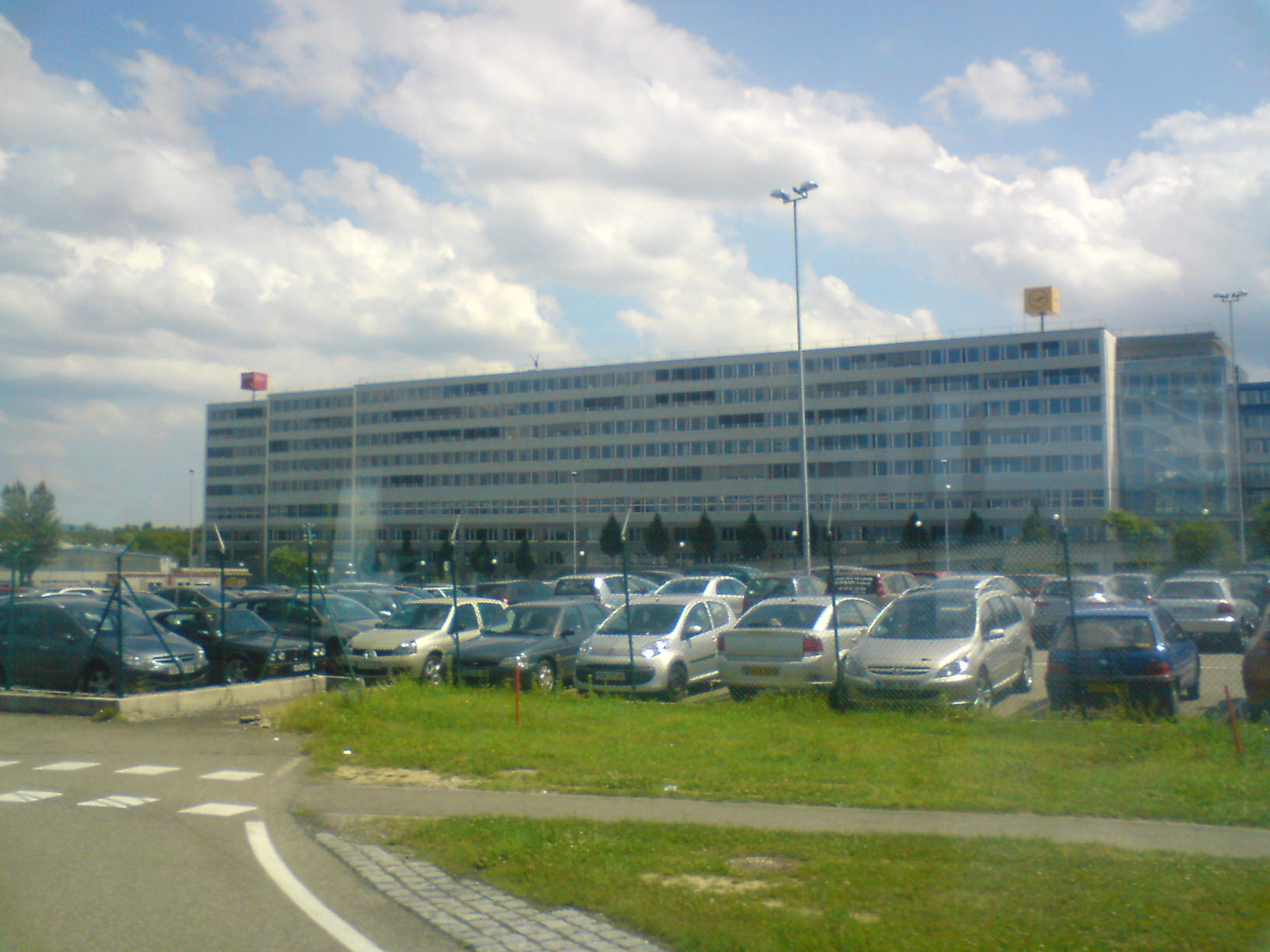
Swiss International Air Lines head office at EuroAirport

- The headquarters of Swiss International Air Lines and Swiss Global Air Lines are on the grounds at EuroAirport Basel–Mulhouse–Freiburg in the Swiss section of the airport; even though the airport is within France, the Swiss head office is only accessible from Switzerland.
- Farnair Switzerland formerly had its head office at EuroAirport. As in the case of the Swiss head office, the area with the former Farnair head office may only be accessed from Switzerland. The head office moved to its current location, the Villa Guggenheim in Allschwil, in proximity to EuroAirport, on 1 October 2011.
- Hello, a now defunct Swiss airline, had its head office in the General Aviation area of EuroAirport.
- Prior to the formation of Swiss International Air Lines, the regional airline Crossair was headquartered on the grounds of EuroAirport. Prior to its dissolution, Crossair Europe was headquartered on the grounds of EuroAirport as well.

== Ground transportation ==
=== Car ===
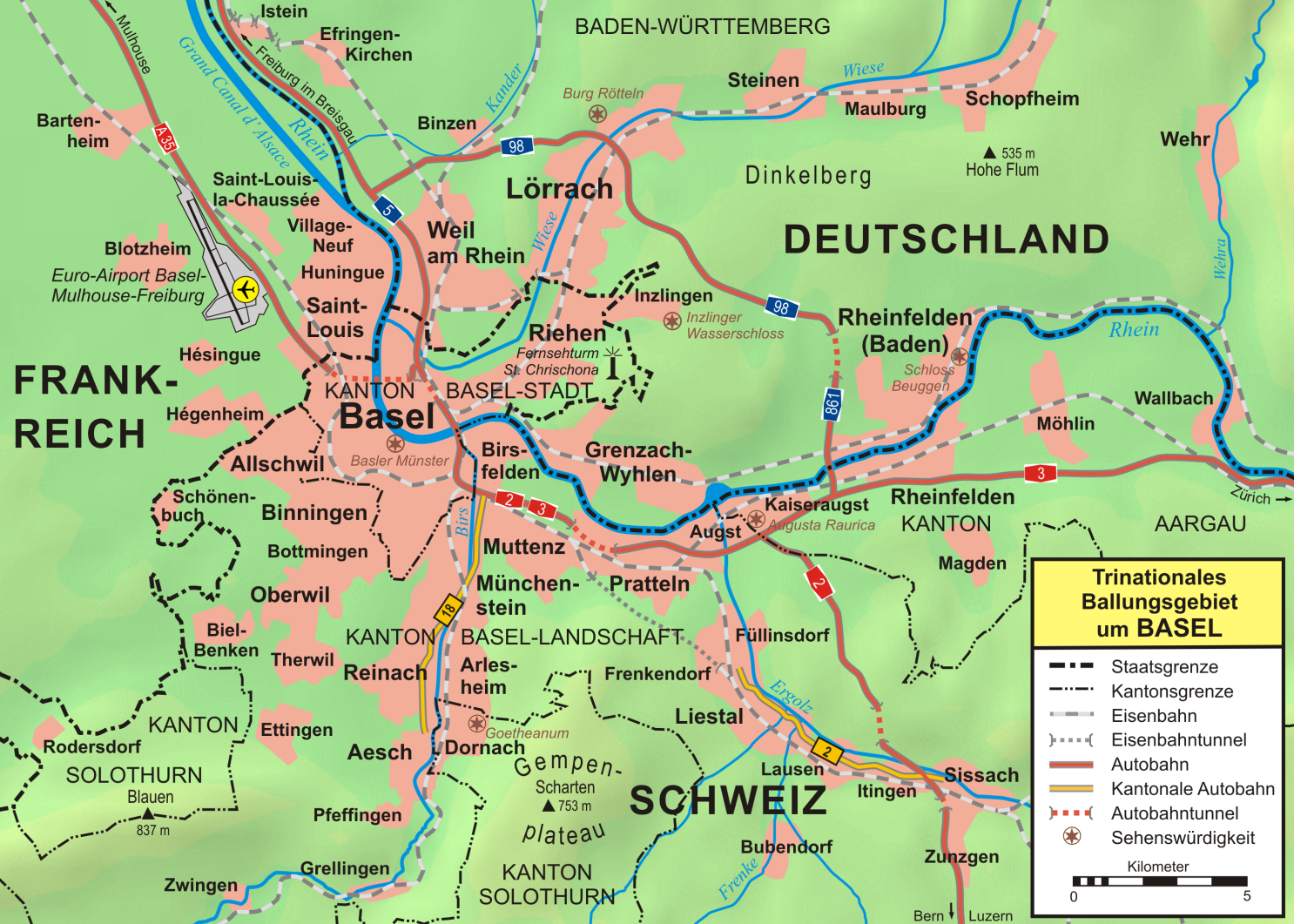
Location of the airport relative to Basel and its surroundings

The airport is connected to motorway A3 which leads from Basel to the southeast of Switzerland passing Zürich.

=== Bus ===
There are several bus connections to and from the EuroAirport to all three countries around it:

- On the Swiss exit Basel's BVB bus No. 50 connects the airport to the Basel SBB railway station, which is the main Swiss and French railway station in Basel. During weekdays, there is a service every 7–8 minutes and on weekends, every 10 minutes during daytime. The duration of the trip is about 20 minutes. On the day of a visitor's arrival to Basel, a reservation confirmation from a local hotel guarantees a free transfer by public transport from the station or the EuroAirport to the hotel.
- On the French exit, Saint-Louis' DistriBus bus No. 11 connects the airport to the Saint-Louis railway station in 10 minutes.
- The German private bus company Flixbus calls at Zürich, Basel and Freiburg Germany up to five times a day. FlixBus however only serves the French exit of the airport. Serving Swiss destinations from the French part of the airport is a questionable legal trick, as people transport by foreign companies inside of Switzerland is illegal without official authorization due to cabotage regulations, which will not be granted by Swiss authorities on routes already supported by tax-financed public services. It's illegal to travel between Swiss destinations only. Police started to do random checks and to fine failing travelers. Serving Swiss destinations from abroad however is compliant.

=== Rail ===
As of 2021, the closest train station is the Saint-Louis-la-Chaussée station, some 900 m (3,000 ft) north of the terminal. Plans to build a dedicated airport rail link have existed for some time. However, political delays have pushed the earliest operating date to 2035.

== Contamination ==
In 2025 approximately 60,000 properties in 11 communes surrounding to the airport were told their tap water had been contaminated with PFAS from EuroAirport. The local authorities advised that children under two years old, pregnant or breastfeeding women and people with weak immune systems should not to drink the tap water due to the levels of PFAS present.

The PFAS contamination originated from fire fighting foam used at the airport before 2017. Cleanup can cost up to 20 million euro but it is unclear who has to pay this.

== See also ==
- Transport in Switzerland
- Mulhouse–Habsheim Airport
- Swiss customs territory
