= Air Europe (Italy) =

Airline of Italy (1989–2008)

IATA	ICAO	Call sign
PE	AEL	AIR EUROPE
- Founded: 1989
- Commenced operations: 19 December 1989
- Ceased operations: 12 December 2008
- Hubs: Milan–Malpensa
- Secondary hubs: Rome–Fiumicino
- Frequent-flyer program: Qualiflyer; MilleMiglia
- Parent company: Alitalia
- Headquarters: Varese, Italy
- Website: aireurope.it

Air Europe was an Italian airline based at Milan Malpensa Airport, Italy. It was, at the time of closure, part of the Alitalia group.

Air Europe suspended operations in December 2008 after Compagnia Aerea Italiana (which was going to take over as the new Alitalia) decided to close down the Air Europe brand. The airline at one time was a subsidiary of the Volare Group which had its head office in Thiene, Italy, and its commercial management and charter management in Milan.

== History ==
The airline was established in 1989 and started operations on 19 December 1989. It started as part of the Airlines of Europe Group based in the United Kingdom, but became wholly Italian owned in 1991. In December 1997, it inaugurated its first scheduled flight to Havana, Cuba.

It eventually became a subsidiary of Volare Airlines. With this partnership, Air Europe became a major domestic and international airline, operating Airbus A320, Boeing 737, Boeing 757, Boeing 767 and Boeing 777 aircraft.

In 2004, Volare Group S.p.A. (the holding that controlled Air Europe S.p.A. and Volare Airlines S.p.A.) went bankrupt and was put up for sale by the Italian government in December 2004. Alitalia's offer for 38 million euros was the winning bid, but Air One tried to block the sale for various reasons by going to court — this happened five times and, in fact, so many obstacles were placed in front of Alitalia's acquisition of the group (including Alitalia's financial difficulties), that the affair was considered like a soap-opera by the Italians.

In the end, Air One was unsuccessful but Alitalia had to create Volare S.p.A. (also known as Volareweb.com) in order to take over the then Volare "Group" S.p.A. Finally, in May 2006, the former Volare Group employees were transferred to Volare S.p.A. and Air Europe S.p.A.

By 1 January 2008, the airline (Air Europe) was considered an integral part of the Alitalia Group. That year Alitalia used it for long-haul leisure destinations such as Mauritius.

In September 2008, Compagnia Aerea Italiana (CAI) made an offer to buy Alitalia, to save it from the bankruptcy to which it too was destined, and, on 12 December 2008, the offer was accepted. As a part of the re-branding, CAI decided that it was going to close Air Europe as there was no longer a need for it. As a partner for leisure long-haul operations, it is possible that the "new" Alitalia will use Air Italy, an airline with which Alitalia already has some agreements.

== See also ==
- List of defunct airlines of Italy
- Air Europe (1979–1991)
- Air Europa (1986-active)
