= Swiss customs territory =

Territory where Swiss customs law is applied, including exclusions and inclusions

Swiss customs territory refers to the territory in which the Federal Office for Customs and Border Security (FOCBS) enforces Swiss customs law. The Swiss customs territory differs from the national territory mainly due to customs-excluded territories and customs-included territories.

== Customs-excluded territories ==
The customs-excluded territories are the valleys of Samnaun and Sampuoir (in Valsot municipality). Although they lie within Swiss sovereign territory, they are outside the customs borders for historical and geographical reasons. Until the construction of the Samnaun road, which runs entirely on Swiss territory, these valleys were only accessible via Austria.

Another customs-excluded area consists of the platforms of Basel Badischer Bahnhof (Baden Station) in Basel. Unlike the station building itself, the platforms belong not to the Swiss customs territory but to the German/EU customs area. The customs border is located at the city-side entrance to the platform underpass.

== Customs-included territories ==
Swiss customs-included territories are areas of other states that are nevertheless treated as part of the Swiss customs territory. No customs controls take place at the border with Switzerland itself.

There are two such territories:

- The Principality of Liechtenstein is fully part of the Swiss customs territory. It shares the Swiss franc as its currency with Switzerland, has a joint postal administration, and forms a customs union with Switzerland, despite being a member of the European Economic Area (EEA). The customs border here runs along the border with Austria.
- The German municipality of Büsingen am Hochrhein (Landkreis Konstanz), near Schaffhausen, is an enclave completely surrounded by Swiss territory. Since 1967, a state treaty between the two countries has regulated various issues arising from this situation. For example, vehicles registered in Büsingen are treated like Swiss vehicles but must be declared for customs if imported from Germany. In most other respects, Büsingen is economically integrated into Switzerland.

The reasons for these arrangements differ. Liechtenstein, as a small state, has an interest in economic ties to larger neighbouring markets and, after Austria's defeat in World War I, chose closer relations with Switzerland. In the case of the German EU exclave of Büsingen, maintaining a customs border would be difficult to control and would cause economic disadvantages and complications for the population.

=== Historical ===
The Italian municipality of Campione d'Italia (Province of Como), on the eastern shore of Lake Lugano, is likewise an enclave surrounded by Switzerland and economically strongly integrated into it. However, no state treaty existed. Until the end of 2019, the small territory was de facto part of the Swiss customs territory while de jure an Italian and later European customs-excluded territory. On 1 January 2020, Campione d'Italia joined the EU customs territory, and since then the border between Campione and Switzerland has been a customs border.

== Duty-free zones ==
Duty-free zones are airport customs areas. They belong to the customs territory but are treated as customs foreign territory.

Bonded warehouses have no longer been considered customs foreign territory since 1 May 2007; they are now part of the customs territory. The previous status regularly caused problems in applying other federal law unrelated to customs.

== Customs-free roads ==
Switzerland has three customs-free roads that allow road traffic in border regions without customs controls.

=== EuroAirport Basel-Mulhouse-Freiburg – Basel ===
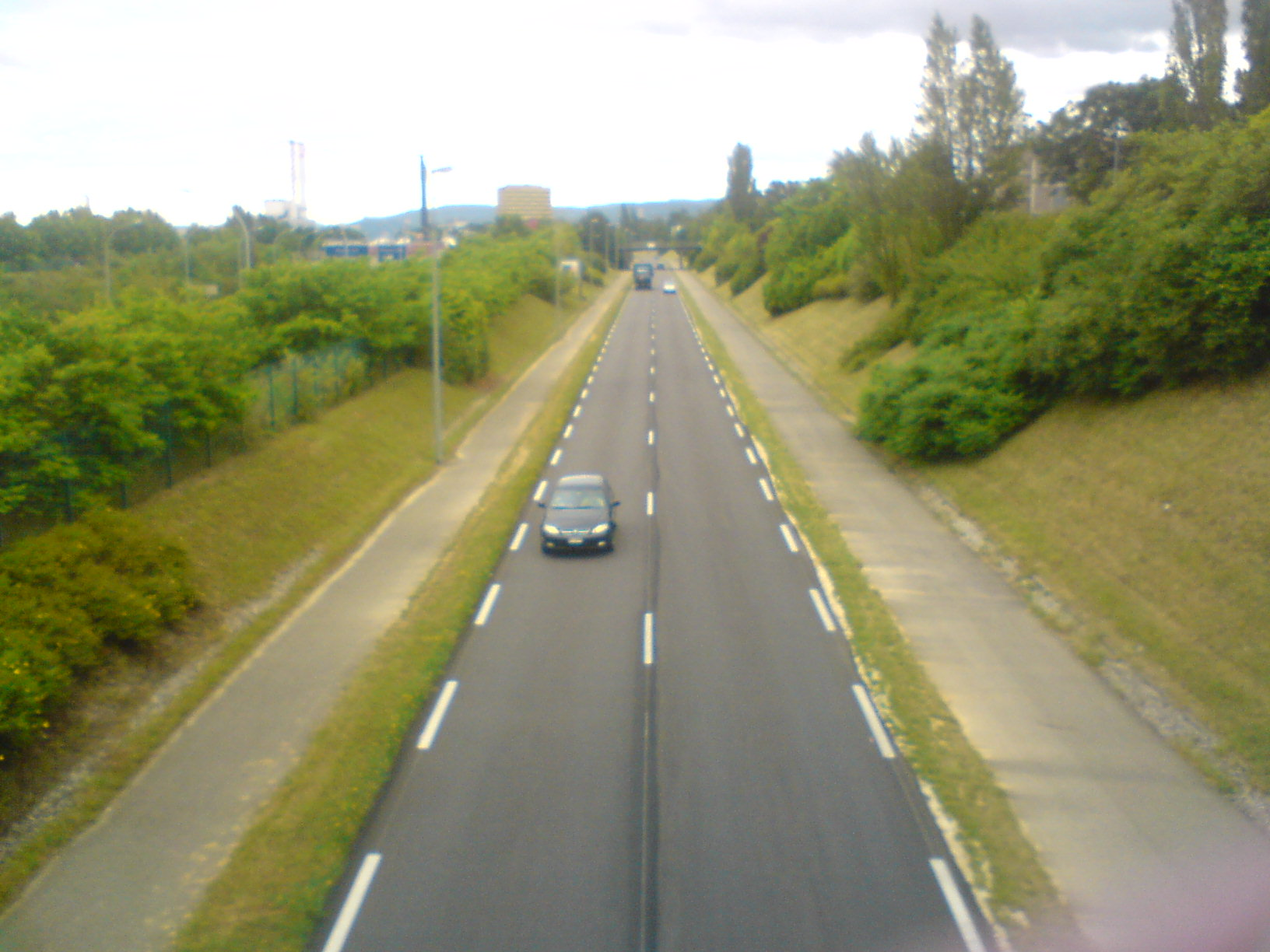
Customs-free road to EuroAirport Basel-Mulhouse-Freiburg

A Swiss customs-free road runs across French territory: EuroAirport Basel Mulhouse Freiburg, which lies on French soil, is connected to the city of Basel (Switzerland) by a fenced customs-free road (Route Douanière). The airport, a joint French-Swiss project, is the third-largest airport in Switzerland. The road is also used by the airport bus (Basler Verkehrs-Betriebe line 50), which connects Basel SBB railway station with the airport every 15 minutes.

=== Geneva Airport ===
Geneva Airport is connected to France by a customs-free road. It allows goods to be transported without passing through customs controls and remains subject exclusively to French/European procedures.

=== Weil am Rhein – Lörrach ===
Since the 19th century, the German neighbouring municipalities of Weil am Rhein and Lörrach have sought a customs-free road along the river Wiese through the territory of the Swiss municipality of Riehen in Canton of Basel-Stadt. The project was regulated in a 1977 state treaty between Switzerland and Germany and has since been amended several times. It remained controversial due to possible damage to the last near-natural river section and difficult tectonic conditions at the "Schlipf" section of the Tüllinger Hill. After years of resistance and public protests, completion was repeatedly delayed. The German customs-free road across Swiss territory began construction in 2006 and was provisionally opened to traffic on 4 October 2013.

== Customs corridors through the Swiss customs territory ==
In rail transport between Germany and Italy, a customs corridor (the so-called T2 corridor procedure) exists, allowing EU goods to be transported through the Swiss customs territory without customs formalities. Only certain railway companies are authorised to use this corridor.

== Smuggling ==
During and between World War I and World War II, smuggling between Switzerland and its neighbouring countries was widespread due to severe supply shortages in those countries.

== Bibliography ==
- Sven Bradke (1998). 75 Jahre Zollvertrag Schweiz-Liechtenstein. Jubiläumsschrift im Auftrage der Gesellschaft Schweiz-Liechtenstein. Schriftenreihe der Gesellschaft Schweiz – Liechtenstein. Vol. 8. St. Gallen: Gesellschaft Schweiz-Liechtenstein.
- Michael von Graffenried: Grenzen wurden von Menschen geschaffen und werden von ihnen offen gehalten. Eidg. Oberzolldirektion, Bern [1990].
- Thomas Klöti: Die Zollkarte der Schweiz (1825) von Johann Caspar Zellweger und Heinrich Keller. Die Entstehung einer Grundlage für die Revision der Transit- und Binnenzölle. In: Cartographica Helvetica. issue 14, 1996, pp. 25–34 (full text).
