= Dialogue marketing =

Business marketing technique

Dialogue marketing emerged in the early 2000s, as companies engaged willing consumers in an ongoing dialogue to create lasting relationships. For example, based on data, marketers invite groups of likely consumers to connect with the company. The engagement process provides value to both the consumer and the company. Marketers use these opportunities as data collection points. The companies use the data to further customize their marketing messages and personalize the experience for their consumers and market segments. In exchange for sharing opinions, buying patterns, etc., consumers receive perks such as discounts, tips, and free trials as well as appropriate messaging from the company.

To succeed, dialogue marketing requires that businesses understand their unique value and how it impacts consumers, identify their key customers and prospective customers, develop the appropriate messages and methods to engage them, implement a plan to reach out and connect with the right consumers, and foster relationships with them. Measurement is a key component of dialogue marketing as it helps businesses track and measure their marketing and sales successes and failures and refine their strategy based on the feedback received. Comprising four essential stages, dialogue marketing integrates advertising, public relations and marketing into one strategy. Vendors include advertising agencies, marketing and branding companies, digital printers, data specialists, social media experts and loyalty and referral program designers.

Combining traditional methods of advertising with technological advancements such as Web 2.0, social media, personalized microsites, variable data printing and blogs, marketers have found that dialogue marketing is both an efficient and effective means of spending their marketing dollars. In focusing marketing efforts on those individuals who are already open to engagement and creating opportunities for them to connect on their terms, businesses increase brand loyalty, referrals, cross-sales and repeat business.

== History of Dialogue Marketing ==
Dialogue marketing can track its roots to permission marketing and relationship marketing, and is similar to engagement marketing and double loop marketing. A direct reaction to traditional push marketing, the goal of dialogue marketing is to develop ongoing and long-lasting relationships with the right consumers.

Dialogue marketing is based on the premise that engaging consumers in relevant and personal conversations is more important than ever. As technology arms consumers with new ways to ignore messaging, disconnect from branding and disengage from the marketplace altogether; marketers believe that connecting on a personal level with consumers who do or will buy because the company resonates with them helps companies differentiate themselves and stand out as leaders in the marketplace.

== The Dialogue Marketing Process ==
Dialogue marketing is a four-stage process designed to help companies develop long-lasting and mutually beneficial relationships with customers and consumers.

=== Brand ===
Companies who know who they are and who their customers are find themselves better positioned to share and connect with their target audience. Dialogue marketing helps businesses appreciate their self-worth and commit to establishing and developing relationships with those consumers and customers who appreciate their unique value.

=== Strategize ===
With a clear understanding of themselves and their intended audience, companies are able to develop clear messages and determine effective methods of engagement. Their strategy and tactical efforts are driven by their particular brand and the wants, needs and personality of their target markets. Dialogue marketing provides companies with access to the necessary data and the tools and resources to strategize a successful plan that fits their mold.

=== Engage ===
Dialogue Marketing uses a combination of traditional and technological efforts to reach customers, invite them to connect, foster ongoing relationships and forge new ones. Dialogue marketers work with companies to design customized engagement plans and processes that are not only effective and efficient but sustainable and measurable.

Depending upon a company’s customer profile, dialogue marketers may use outreach methods such as magazine ads, television commercials or radio spots with an incentive attached to invite consumers to visit a microsite or fill out a survey.

Dialogue marketers use automated systems to gather, store and track consumer data, such as communications preferences, product and service interests, demographics, technographics and other details. In addition, the dialogue marketing process implements an automated nurturing program to personalize messages, send them at specific times and deliver them via a variety of means – from direct mail to email. The consumer’s response or lack of a response to specific messages triggers additional invitations, requests, reminders or suggestions designed with the individual in mind. The same nurturing system can be integrated with loyalty and referral programs as well as up-sell and cross-sell promotions that are both relevant and timely.

=== Measure ===
The dialogue marketing system tracks, measures, and analyzes results to determine the connection between sales and marketing. With this data, businesses can alter messaging, shift market focus, and re-brand products to adjust to consumer buying habits.
