= List of defunct airlines of Switzerland =

This is a list of now defunct airlines from Switzerland.

Airline	Image	IATA	ICAO	Callsign	Commenced operations	Ceased operations	Notes
Adria Airways Switzerland		F7	DWT	DARWIN	2017	2017	
Ad Astra Aero					1919	1931	Merged with Balair to form Swissair
Aero Jet			AOJ		1992	1996	
Aeroleasing		FP	FPG		1978	1979	Renamed/merged with TAG Aviation
Air Alpes			CCV		1996	1997	
Air City		SE	ACY		1987	1991	Rebranded Aero Jet
Air Engiadina		RQ	RQX		1987	2001	Rebranded Swisswings
Air Sea Service		KF;WJ			1974	1980	Renamed/merged with Rhineair
Air Starline			ACR	ASA	1990	1994	Formed by African Safari Airways.
Air Switzerland					2002	2002	
ASL Airlines Switzerland			FAT	FARNER	2015	2018	
Astra Airlines			ARN		2001	2003	
Baboo		F7	BBO	BABOO	2003	2010	Merged with Darwin Airline
Basler Aviation AG				BALAIR	1925	1931	Merged with Ad Astra Aero to form Swissair
Balair (1953-1993)		BB	BBB	BALAIR	1953	1993	Merged with Compagnie de Transport Aériens to form BalairCTA
BalairCTA		BB	BBB	BALAIR	1993	1995	Renamed Balair
Balair (1997-2001)		BB	BBB	BALAIR	1997	2001	Renamed Belair
Belair		4T	BHP	BELAIR	2001	2017	
BenAvia			BEA		1998	2002	
Catran				Commercial Air Transport	2002	2004	
Classic Air					1985	2003	
Connect Air					2004	2008	
Crossair		LX	CRX	CROSSAIR	1978	2002	Rebranded Swiss International Air Lines
Crossair Europe		QE	ECC	Cigogne	1998	2005	
Compagnie de Transport Aériens		RU	CTA		1978	1993	Merged with Balair to form Balair CTA
Darwin Airline		F7	DWT	DARWIN	2003	2014	Renamed Etihad Regional
Etihad Regional		F7	DWT	DARWIN	2014	2017	Renamed Adria Airways Switzerland
Farnair Switzerland		FT	FAT	FARNER	1997	2015	Rebranded ASL Airlines Switzerland
Farner Air Transport			FAT		1984	1997	Renamed Farnair Switzerland
Globe Air					1957	1967	
Hello		HW	FHE	FLYHELLO	2004	2012	Went bankrupt
Helvetic Wings					2004	2004	
JetClub					2003	2011	
Ju-Air					1982	2018	
MSLAG					1935	1956	
Odette Airways			OAW		2002	2003	Rebranded Helvetic Airways
Phoenix Airways		HP			1970	1974	
Petrolair					1977	1989	Rebranded PrivatAir
PrivatAir		PT	PTI	PRIVATAIR	1989	2018	
Rhine Air					1980	1982	
SA de Transport Aérien					1966	1978	
Servair					1984	2008	Rebranded Swiss Private Aviation
SkyWork Airlines		SX	SRK	SKYFOX	1983	2018	
Swiss Eagle			EAB		2002	2009	
Swiss European Air Lines					2005	2015	Rebranded Swiss Global Air Lines
Swiss Global Air Lines		LZ	SWU	EUROSWISS	2005	2018	Absorbed into Swiss International Air Lines
Swiss Private Aviation		LX	SWZ	SWISSBIRD	2008	2011	
Swiss World Airways		SO	SWO		1997	1998	
Swissair		SR	SWR	SWISSAIR	1931	2002	Transferred to Crossair
Swissair Asia					1995	2001	
Swisswings		RQ	RQX		2001	2002	
TEA Basel		BH	TSW		1989	1993	Rebranded TEA Switzerland
TEA Switzerland		BH	TSW		1993	1999	Rebranded EasyJet Switzerland
Transvalair					1973	1980	

== See also ==
- List of airlines of Switzerland
- List of airports in Switzerland
