= List of airlines of Switzerland =

This is a list of airlines operating with an air operator's certificate granted by the Federal Office of Civil Aviation of Switzerland.

== Scheduled airlines ==
Airline	AOC no.	Photo	IATA	ICAO	Callsign	Hub airport(s)	Notes
Chair Airlines	CH.AOC.1052		CS	GSW	EIGER	Zurich Airport	
EasyJet Switzerland	CH.AOC.1018		DS	EZS	TOPSWISS	Geneva International Airport; EuroAirport Basel Mulhouse Freiburg	Operates flights on behalf of EasyJet plc (U2)
Edelweiss Air	CH.AOC.1007		WK	EDW	EDELWEISS	Zurich Airport	
Helvetic Airways	CH.AOC.1033		2L	OAW	HELVETIC	Zurich Airport	Operates scheduled flights on behalf of Swiss International Air Lines (LX)
Swiss International Air Lines	CH.AOC.1006		LX	SWR	SWISS	Zurich Airport; Geneva Airport	Flag carrier of Switzerland

== Charter airlines ==
Airline	AOC no.	Photo	IATA	ICAO	Callsign	Hub airport(s)	Notes
Air Corviglia	CH.AOC.1061			PIZ	CAPRICORN	Engadin Airport	
Air Mountain	CH.AOC.1054					Sion Airport	
Albinati Aeronautics	CH.AOC.1036						
AMAC Corporate Jet	CH.AOC.1058						
BHS Aviation	CH.AOC.1060						
Cat Aviation	CH.AOC.1004						
Dasnair	CH.AOC.1035						
Haute Aviation	CH.AOC.1057					Saanen Airport	
Jet Aviation	CH.AOC.1010		PP	PJS	JETAVIATION	Zurich Airport, Teterboro Airport	
Lions Air	CH.AOC.1501			LEU	LIONSAIR		
Nomad Aviation	CH.AOC.1046						
Premium Jet	CH.AOC.1011						
Swiss Air-Rescue	CH.AOC.1015					Zurich Airport	
Swiss Private Jet	CH.AOC.1056						
Zimex Aviation	CH.AOC.1025		C4	IMX	ZIMEX	Zurich Airport	

== See also ==
- List of defunct airlines of Switzerland
- Lists of airlines
