= Air Zermatt =

Swiss airline and flight school

IATA	ICAO	Call sign
—	AZF	AIR ZERMATT
- Founded: 1968
- Fleet size: 10
- Headquarters: Zermatt, Switzerland
- Key people: Gerold Biner (CEO)
- Employees: 65
- Website: www.air-zermatt.ch

Air Zermatt AG is a Swiss airline and flight school based in Zermatt. The company has an office at the Aéroport de Sion in the canton of Valais and bases in Gampel, Raron and Zermatt. It employs approximately 65 people.

== History ==
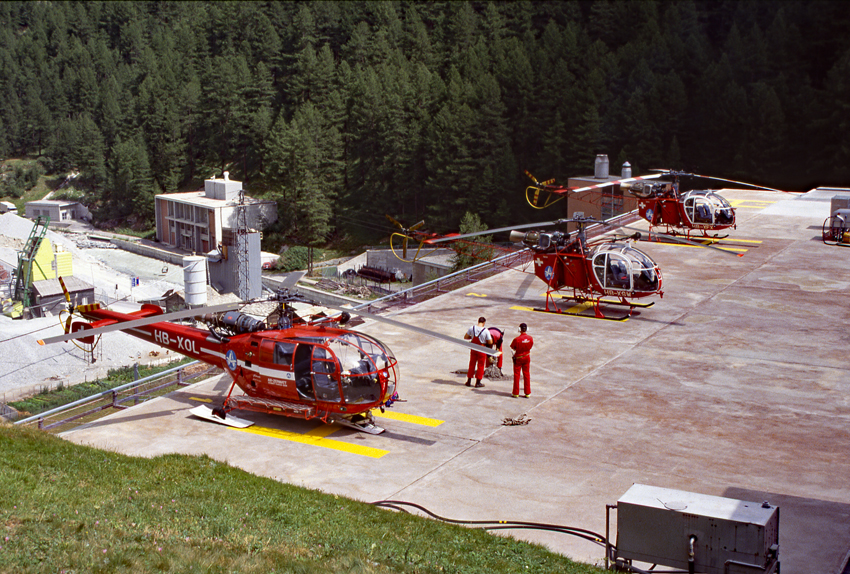
Zermatt Helipad with an Alouette III and two S319B Lamas

Air Zermatt was founded in 1968.

In 1973 Air Zermatt introduced medicalization in helicopter rescue. As the first rescue company in Switzerland, it employs permanent doctors and paramedics who accompany the helicopter crews on their rescue missions.

In March 2020, Air Zermatt and Air-Glaciers announced a merger. Regional anchoring for both companies will remain and they will both have their own board of directors and CEO.

== Fleet ==
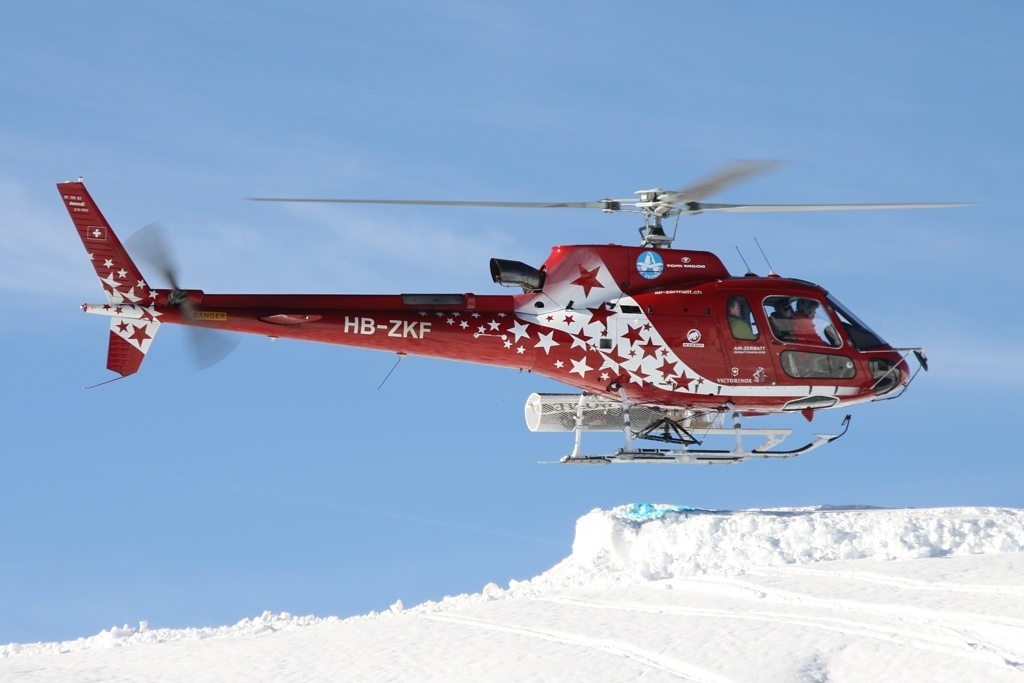
Air Zermatt's Eurocopter AS-350B-3 Ecureuil

The Air Zermatt fleet consists of the following aircraft (as of January 2020):

Fishtail Air fleet
Aircraft	In Fleet	Orders	Passengers			Uses
Aircraft	In Fleet	Orders	C	Y	Total	Uses
Eurocopter AS 350 B3	5	0				Sightseeing; Taxi; Transport; Rescue
Aérospatiale SA 315B Lama	1	0				Sightseeing; Transport; Rescue
Eurocopter EC 135 T3	1	0				Taxi; Rescue
Eurocopter EC 130 T2	1	0				Sightseeing; Rescue
Bell 429	2	0				Taxi; Rescue
Total	10	0				

== Media ==
In 2010, Air Zermatt was part of a documentary by Swiss Schweizer Radio und Fernsehen, titled The mountain rescuers in the Himalayas wherein the airline, in cooperation with Fishtail Air, was establishing a mountaineering rescue station in Lukla.

In 2016, the series "The Horn" was released on Netflix, which in addition to the way the company works, shed light on individual employees and assignments.
