= Belair (airline) =

Charter airline of Switzerland (1925–2017)

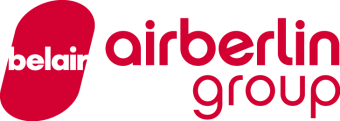

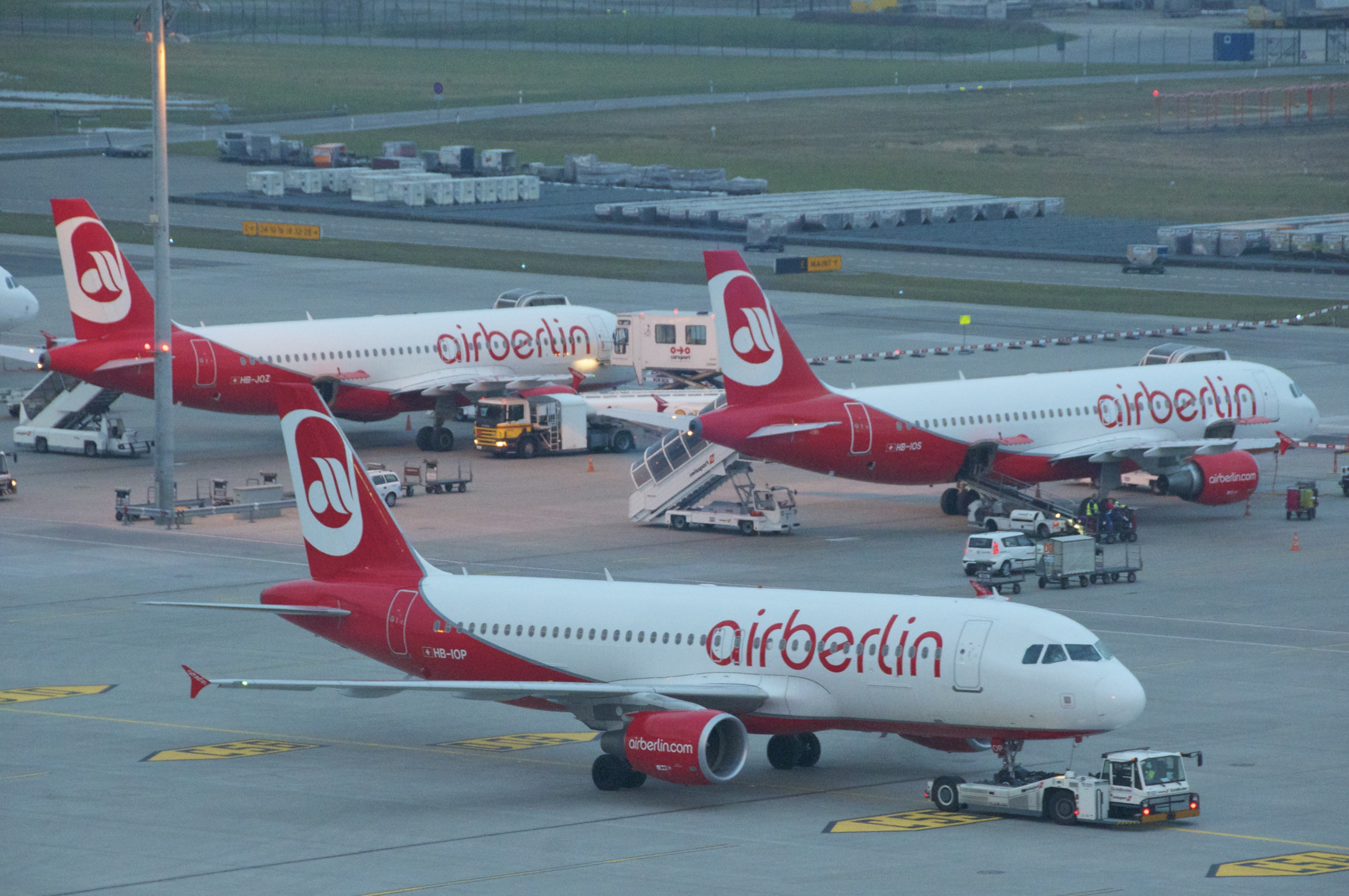
IATA	ICAO	Call sign
4T	BHP	BELAIR
- Founded: 1925 (as Balair I); January 1953 (as Balair II); 16 October 2001 (as Belair)
- Commenced operations: June 1957 (as Balair II); 1 January 1993 (as BalairCTA); 1 November 1997 (as Balair); 3 November 2001 (as Belair)
- Ceased operations: 1 January 1931(as Balair I; merged with Ad Astra Aero to form Swissair); 27 October 2017 (as Belair)
- Operating bases: Basel/Mulhouse; Zürich
- Frequent-flyer program: Qualiflyer (1992–2002); topbonus (2002–2017)
- Alliance: Oneworld (affiliate; 2012–2017)
- Parent company: Swissair (1993–2001); Air Berlin (2001–2017)
- Headquarters: Opfikon, Zürich, Switzerland

Belair, legally Belair Airlines AG, was a Swiss charter airline headquartered in Glattbrugg operating out of Zürich Airport and EuroAirport Basel Mulhouse Freiburg. It was a subsidiary of Air Berlin and operated under the Air Berlin brand name until 31 March 2017. During the 2017 summer season, it flew on behalf of its sister company Niki and was shuttered by then-bankrupt Air Berlin on 28 October 2017.

== History ==
=== The first Balair (1925–1931) ===
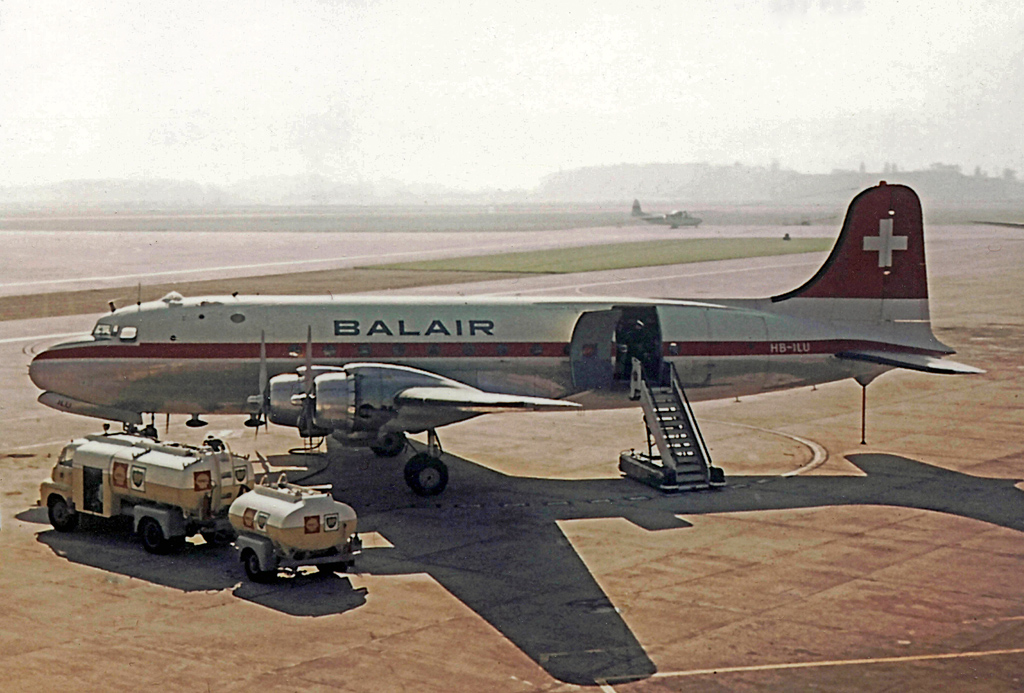
A Balair Douglas DC-4 at Manchester Airport in 1963

Basler Aviation AG - Balair was founded by Balz Zimmermann in 1925 in Basel. The name Balair is a reference to the French name of Basel: Bâle. The first route was from Basel to Freiburg and Mannheim. In 1929, Balair grew at Basel Airport, the largest airport in Switzerland, with direct flights to Zürich, Geneva, Lyon, Karlsruhe and Frankfurt. In response to the Great Depression, Balair (based in Basel) and Ad Astra Aero (based in Zürich) merged on 1 January 1931 to form Swissair, headquartered in Zürich. Up to that point, Balair had carried over 18,000 passengers, 320 tons of cargo, and 143 tons of mail. The company only flew in the summer and was mainly financed by federal subsidies and mail transportation for the Swiss post office.

=== The second Balair (1953–1993) ===
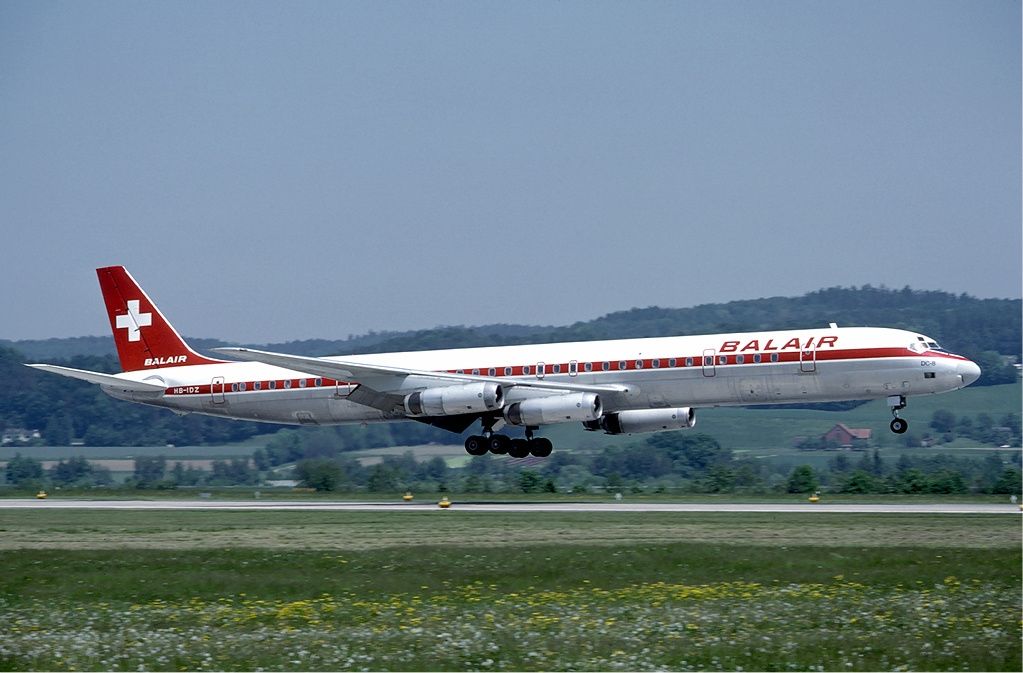
A Balair Douglas DC-8-63CF at Zurich Airport in 1985

On 5 October 1952, the Basel electorate voted for the creation of a limited company. Soon, the second Balair was founded in January 1953, with Hans Peter Tschudin elected as the first president. In its early years, Balair was active in flight training, maintenance, and handling Swissair aircraft at Basel-Mulhouse Airport. Balair entered the charter business by acquiring two Vickers VC.1 Vikings in June 1957. In 1959, Swissair acquired a 40% stake in Balair. Two Swissair DC-4s were added to the fleet and later the DC-6 came into service in 1961.

During the Biafran airlift (1967–71), chartered aircraft, including C-97 Stratocruisers, delivered humanitarian aid to a remote Biafran airstrip in eastern Nigeria.

The airline's first jet aircraft was the Convair 990 Coronado and then the McDonnell Douglas DC-9-32 entered service followed by a Douglas DC-8-63CF which it flew on routes to Colombo, Bangkok and Rio de Janeiro.

In 1979, Balair added a McDonnell Douglas DC-10-30 to its fleet. By 1982, Balair became an all-jet airline and by 1986, the Airbus A310-300 and MD-82 were the mainstay of the fleet. Later, Swissair operated charter flights using the Balair name. By this time, Swissair was a majority owner.

=== BalairCTA (1993–1995) ===
In 1993, Balair and CTA – Compagnie de Transport Aérien were merged and formed a new airline named BalairCTA. For political reasons, the registered office of the company was in Geneva and the accounting department in Basel. The operational base was moved to Zürich. Despite restructuring and mass layoffs, the Swissair charter business was unprofitable and operations ended in 1995. Short-haul operations were transferred to Crossair and long-haul operations to Swissair.

=== The new Balair (1997–2001) ===
Balair's logo

In 1997, Swissair's charter business was outsourced again, and on 1 November 1997, BalairCTA resumed operations as a subsidiary of Swissair, reverting to the Balair name. On short and medium-haul routes, two Boeing 757-200s were operated exclusively for tour operator Hotelplan and its subsidiaries ESCO-Reise and M-Travel. The lessee was also Hotelplan. Balair also had two Boeing 767-300ERs for long-haul operations. However, the new Balair was affected by the failure of Swissair. On 5 October 2001, the last Balair flight landed in Zürich. The Boeing 767s were returned to the lessor.

=== Belair (2001–2017) ===
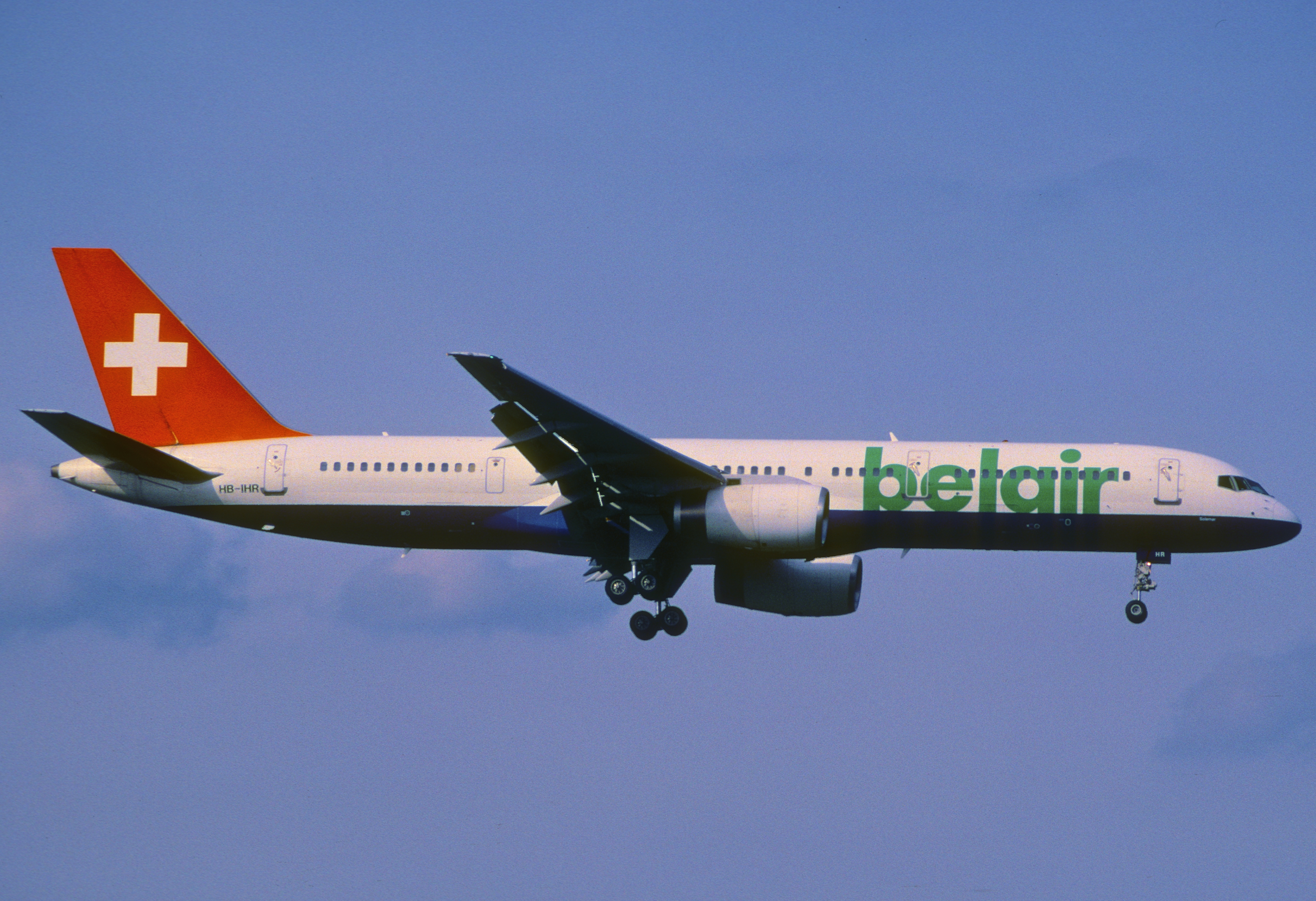
A Belair Boeing 757-200 at Zurich Airport in 2004

After consulting Migros (its parent company), Hotelplan founded a new charter airline named Belair and transferred their Boeing 757s to it. It entered into the commercial register on 16 October 2001. The minor name change meant it was possible to repaint the two Migros-owned Boeing 757s with very little effort. 120 Balair employees were employed by the new company.

The first Belair commercial flight took place on 3 November 2001, departing from Zürich. Flights were mainly to Mediterranean resorts. Besides the two Boeing 757s it operated, Belair also leased a Boeing 767-300ER for long-haul operations.

As part of the partnership with REGA (Swiss Air Rescue), a 757 was redesigned by Belair to be used as a rescue aircraft for repatriations in case of disasters.

==== Part of Air Berlin ====
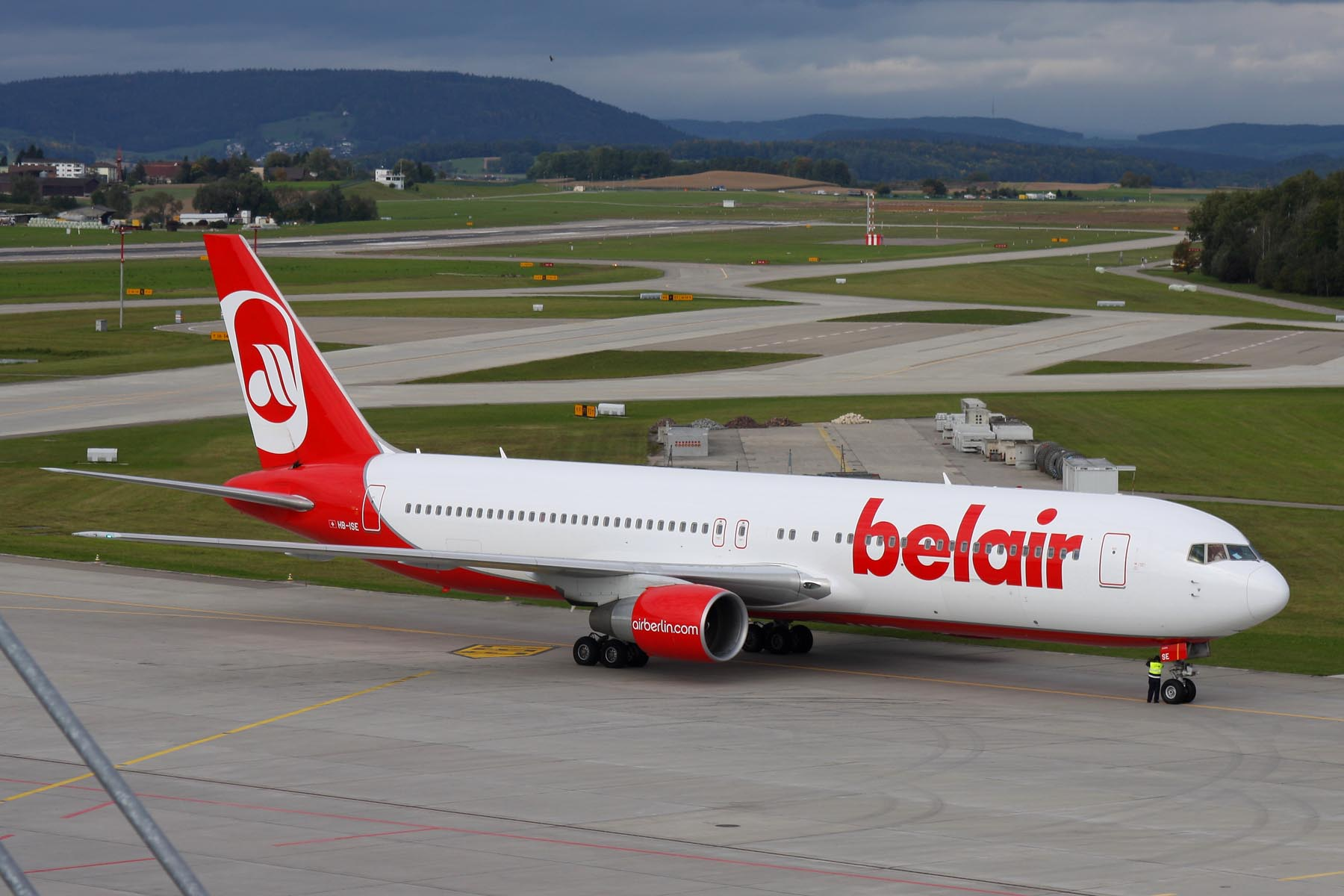
A Belair Boeing 767-300ER in the adapted Air Berlin livery

Air Berlin acquired 49% of Belair in 2007 and fully owned it after October 2009. This increased Air Berlin's presence in Switzerland and provided Migros customers access to more flights. While Air Berlin owned Belair, Belair was managed from Berlin and Air Berlin only published consolidated financial statements. Air Berlin Switzerland (Air Berlin pilots), the CHS Switzerland (Air Berlin flight attendants), and Belair were combined to form the new company Belair on 1 January 2010.

Belair flew from Zürich, Basel, and Geneva to Mediterranean destinations and the Canary Islands. The aircraft used to have Belair signage combined with Air Berlin's corporate design, but then wore Air Berlin's livery. Due to bilateral traffic rights, certain routes to non-EU countries continued to use Belair's IATA code, 4T.

==== Shutdown ====
On 15 January 2017, it was announced that Belair would shut down all routes from EuroAirport Basel Mulhouse Freiburg. On 1 April 2017, the four Airbus A321-200s began to operate on behalf of Niki and switched from Air Berlin to Niki flight numbers on routes to EU destinations. Belair ceased operations on 28 October 2017. In December 2017, it was reported that Belair lacked the funds to pay outstanding salaries and other expenses and might face bankruptcy.

== Destinations ==
These are the final destinations of Belair before its shutdown on 28 October 2017:

Airport	Country	IATA	Notes
Alicante–Elche Miguel Hernández Airport	Spain	HG	
EuroAirport Basel Mulhouse Freiburg	Switzerland; France; Germany	HG	Base
Brindisi Airport	Italy	HG	
Catania-Fontanarossa Airport	Italy	HG	
Faro Airport	Portugal	HG	
Fuerteventura Airport	Spain	HG	
Cristiano Ronaldo International Airport	Portugal	HG	
Gran Canaria Airport	Spain	HG	
Lanzarote Airport	Spain	HG	
Palma de Mallorca Airport	Spain	HG	
Pristina International Airport	Kosovo	4T	
Skopje "Alexander the Great" Airport	North Macedonia	4T	
Tenerife South Airport	Spain	HG	
Zürich Airport	Switzerland	HG and 4T	Base

== Fleet ==
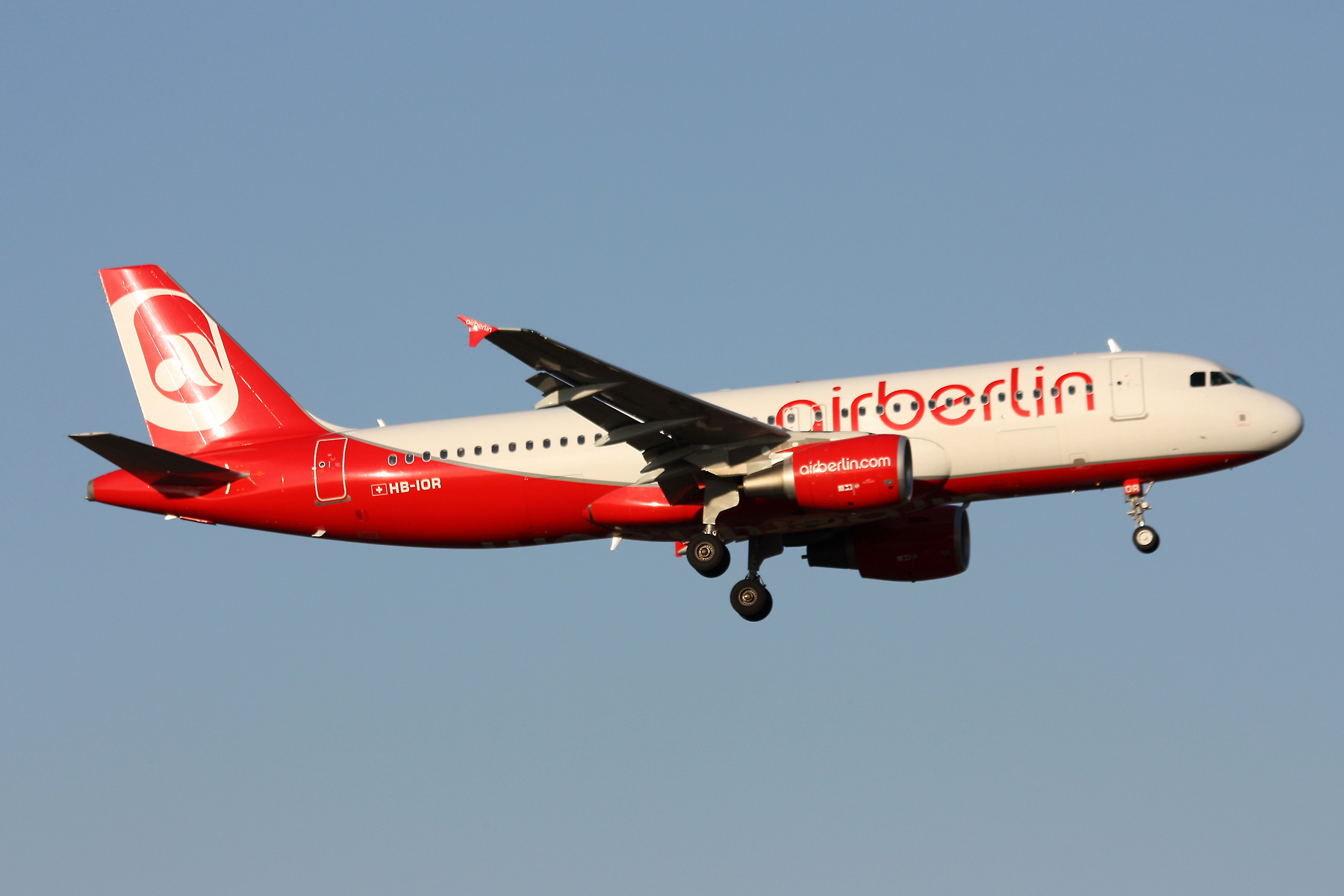
A Belair Airbus A320-200 in the Air Berlin livery, only to be distinguished by the Swiss registry

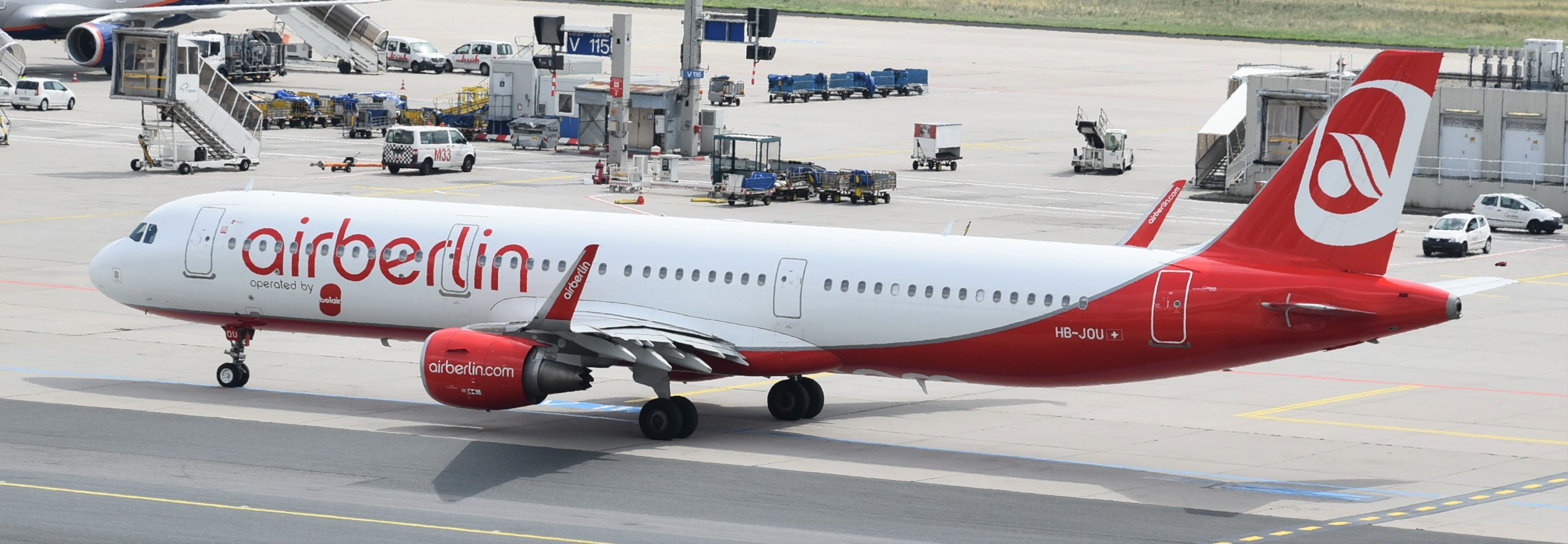
A Belair Airbus A321-200 in the Air Berlin livery, with the Belair logo

Belair (including its predecessor Balair) has operated the following aircraft throughout its existence:

Belair retired fleet
Aircraft	Total	Introduced	Retired	Notes
Airbus A310-300	3	1986	1999	
Airbus A319-100	3	2009	2017	Operated for Air Berlin.
Airbus A320-200	1	2009	2017	Operated for Air Berlin on behalf of Niki.
Airbus A321-200	3	2017	2017	Operated for Air Berlin on behalf of Niki.
Boeing 747-200B	1	1975	1975	Leased from Swissair for one day.
Boeing 757-200	2	2001	2010	
Boeing 767-300ER	4	1999	2001	
Boeing 767-300ER	1	2002	2009	Leased from Air Berlin.
Boeing C-97G Stratofreighter	10	1969	1970	
Cessna AT-17 Bobcat	1	1956	1961	
Convair 990 Coronado	1	1968	1971	Leased from Swissair.
de Havilland Dove	5	Unknown	Unknown	
Douglas C-47 Skytrain	1	1967	1974	
Douglas C-54 Skymaster	3	1959	1969	
Douglas DC-4	2	1959	1970	
Douglas DC-6	7	1961	1982	
Douglas DC-8-55CF	1	1971	1979	
Douglas DC-8-62CF	1	1976	1981	Leased from Swissair.
Douglas DC-8-63PF	1	1973	1985	
Fokker F27 Friendship	7	1964	1996	
McDonnell Douglas DC-9-32	1	1988	1988	
McDonnell Douglas DC-9-33CF	1	1970	1976	
McDonnell Douglas DC-9-34	1	1976	1985	
McDonnell Douglas DC-10-30	1	1979	1982	
McDonnell Douglas MD-82	3	1985	1995	
McDonnell Douglas MD-83	4	1990	1995	
McDonnell Douglas MD-87	4	1993	1996	
Transall C-160	1	1968	1970	
Vickers VC.1 Viking	2	1958	1963	

== Accidents and incidents ==
- 15 May 1960: a Douglas DC-4 (registered HB-ILA) was being ferried from Jeddah to Dakar when it crashed in the Djebel Marr Mountains due to a navigation error. All 12 crew members were killed.
- 13 September 1964: a Fokker F-27 Friendship (registered HB-AAI) was approaching Málaga Airport with a steep descent. It touched down heavily, causing the center section of the wings to break apart and skidded before coming to rest. All 45 occupants on board survived.

== See also ==
- List of defunct airlines of Switzerland
