= Swiss Private Aviation =

Swiss airline

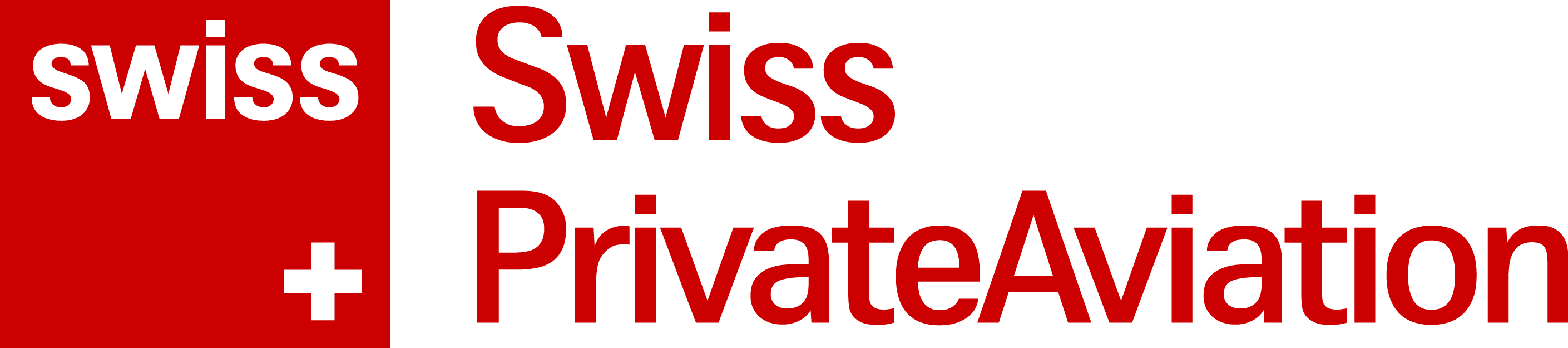
IATA	ICAO	Call sign
LX	SWZ	SWISSBIRD
- Founded: 1984 (as Servair Private Charter)
- Commenced operations: 17 July 2008 (as Swiss Private Aviation)
- Ceased operations: February 2011
- Hubs: Zürich Airport
- Frequent-flyer program: Miles & More
- Parent company: Swiss International Air Lines
- Headquarters: Kloten, Switzerland
- Website: swiss-private-aviation.com

Swiss Private Aviation AG was a fully owned subsidiary of Swiss International Air Lines providing business jet services as well as aircraft management and commercial charter services on behalf of its parent company. Its head office was located in the Swiss International Air Lines Zurich office in Kloten, Switzerland.

== History ==
The airline was founded in 1984 as Servair Private Charter AG and was acquired by Swiss International Air Lines and renamed Swiss Private Aviation on 17 July 2008. Swiss Private was also the operations platform for Lufthansa Private Jet, previously operated by Swiss European Air Lines.

In February 2011, Swiss Private Aviation ceased operations as a result of restructuring. Following its closure, the company suggested Lufthansa Private Jet Service as an alternative.

== Fleet ==
The Swiss Private Aviation fleet consisted of the following aircraft types:

- Cessna Citation XLS+
- Cessna Citation CJ1+
- Cessna Citation CJ3
- Hawker 800
