= Lions Air =

Swiss airline

Lions-Air
IATA	ICAO	Call sign
-	LEU	LIONSAIR
- Founded: 1986; 40 years ago
- Fleet size: 2
- Headquarters: Zürich, Switzerland
- Website: http://www.lionsair.ch

Lions Air is a charter airline based in Zürich, Switzerland. It operates air charter and business services, using fixed-wing aircraft and helicopters.

== History ==
The airline was established in 1986 by Jürg Fleischmann. In June 2005 Lions Air planned to lease a McDonnell Douglas MD-80 to start charter flights from Zurich and Geneva to Pristina, Sarajevo and Skopje, but abandoned the plan later in the year.
