= Swiss World Airways =

Swiss airline (1997–1998)

IATA	ICAO	Call sign
SO	SWO	SWISSWORLD
- Founded: 1997
- Ceased operations: 1998
- Hubs: Geneva Airport
- Fleet size: 1
- Destinations: 2
- Headquarters: 15 Airport 1215, Geneva, Switzerland
- Key people: Jean-Charles Simon; Pierre Porta; Peter Leishman

Swiss World Airways was a Swiss airline based at Geneva Airport. Launched in 1997, the airline suspended operations in 1998.

== History ==
Swiss World Airways was founded in 1997 by Jean-Charles Simon. The airline placed a $203m order for two Boeing 767-300 aircraft in 1997. Led by CEO Peter Leishman, formerly of Easyjet and Debonair, the airline leased a Boeing 767-200ER from Ansett Australia for two years, whilst orders were made for Boeing 737-700 aircraft to provide a smaller aircraft higher yield return for the airline. The first Swiss World Airways flight took off on September 10, 1998, from Geneva. However, the airline's major marketing campaign was cancelled as it was a matter of days since the Swissair Flight 111 accident. Later that month, Swiss World Airways joined Airlines Reporting Corporation. Swiss World Airways leased a Boeing 757 from Air Holland, however the aircraft had range challenges for the flights planned.

Originally observed as a competitor to Swissair, on December 2, 1998, just three months after the inaugural flight, Swiss World Airways suspended flight operations. In the following days, the airline sought funding to continue operating. A consortium led by Saudi Arabian businessman Hani Yamani came close to acquiring the airline and entering into a partnership with Virgin Atlantic. However by early 1999 hopes of reviving Swiss World Airways had vanished.

== Destinations ==
Swiss World Airways only operated scheduled flights from Geneva Airport to Newark Liberty International Airport with flights to Montréal–Dorval International Airport and Miami International Airport announced as being planned.

=== Fleet ===
Swiss World Airways fleet
Aircraft	Total	Registration	Introduced	Retired	Notes
Boeing 757-200	1	PH-AHK	October 1998	December 1998	Leased from Air Holland
Boeing 767-200	1	HB-IIX	June 1998	December 1998	Leased from Ansett Australia; Air New Zealand
