= Saanen Airport =

Airport in Saanen, Switzerland

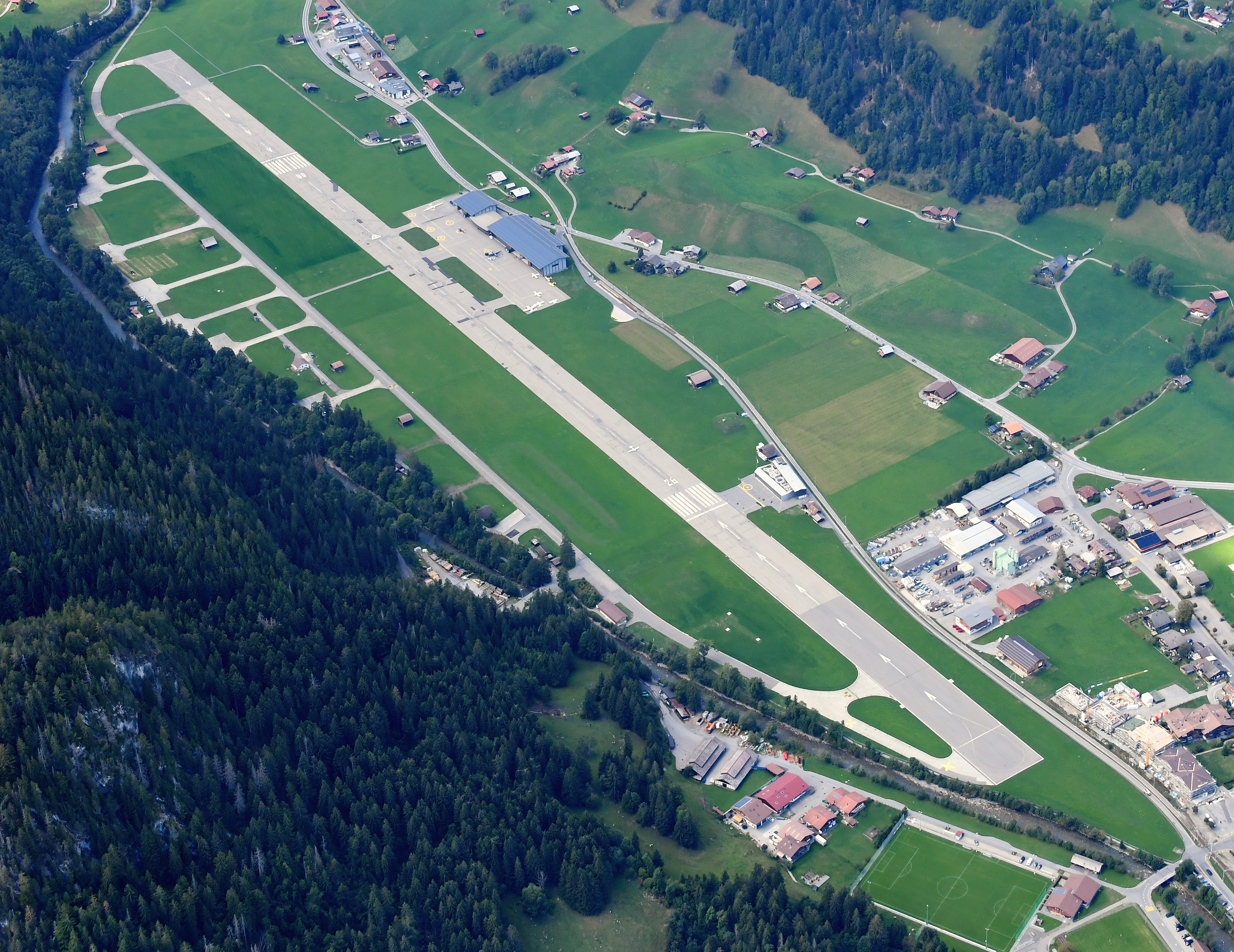
- Saanen Airport from above
- IATA: QYK; ICAO: LSGK

Summary
- Airport type: Public
- Owner/Operator: Airfield Cooperative Gstaad-Saanenland
- Serves: Gstaad
- Time zone: UTC+1 ()
- Elevation AMSL: 3,284 ft (1,001 m)
- Coordinates: 46°29′12″N 007°15′00″E
- Website: www.gstaad-airport.ch/en/
- Interactive map of Saanen Airport

Runways
Direction	Length		Surface
Direction	ft	m	Surface
26/08	4,593	1,400	Asphalt

Saanen Airport (IATA: QYK, ICAO: LSGK) (also known as Gstaad Airport) is an airport in the Saanen municipality, Switzerland.

== History ==
Established during the Second World War, Saanen Airport was originally designed as a fortified airfield. While the site had operated as a grass strip on marshland since 1939, it underwent significant modernization in 1942 with the construction of a paved, hard-surface runway. In October 1943, a detachment from the Swiss Air Force’s Air Company 1 was stationed at the facility. Further infrastructure expansions followed in 1944, including the addition of a repair tunnel and U-43 aircraft shelters.

Civilian activity increased post-war; in 1947, the Swiss Aero Club began utilizing the airfield for glider operations.. By the 1980s, the runway had suffered significant structural degradation, prompting a cooperative from Saanen and Gstaad to invest 1.2 million CHF in essential repairs.

The Airfield Cooperative Gstaad-Saanenland (FGGS) formally acquired the airport in 2011. Under this new ownership, a comprehensive 30 million CHF renovation project was launched in 2017, which included the construction of a contemporary terminal building. As part of this redevelopment, an art gallery was established within the terminal by Tatiana de Pahlen and Antonia Crespi. Since 2020, the airport has been managed by CEO Martin Rufener, formerly a head coach for the Swiss national ski team.

== Public Events ==
The airport serves as a venue for significant regional sporting events:

- Hublot Polo Gold Cup: The airport has long served as the site for this prestigious international polo tournament. Although the event has a multi-decade history at the location, recent editions have seen increased integration with the renovated facilities; however, the competition was suspended for two years in 2020 and 2021 due to the COVID-19 pandemic.
- Gstaad Airport Cup: Established in 2022, this annual skiing competition is organized by the Saanen Ski Club and takes place adjacent to the airfield.

== Facilities ==
The airport has one runway designated 08/26 with an asphalt pavement measuring 1400 x 40 metres (4593 x 131 feet). Local noise abatement rules, prevaialing wind, and recommendations to avoid Schönried, means most aircraft approach for runway 26. In a unique local restriction, during a funeral in Saanen, no aircraft are permitted to land on runway 26 or takeoff on runway 08.

== Airlines ==
The airport does not have scheduled commercial services, however there is extensive private aviation traffic. Several operators, including Air Glaciers, Air Sarina and Haute Aviation are based at the airport.

== Accidents and incidents ==
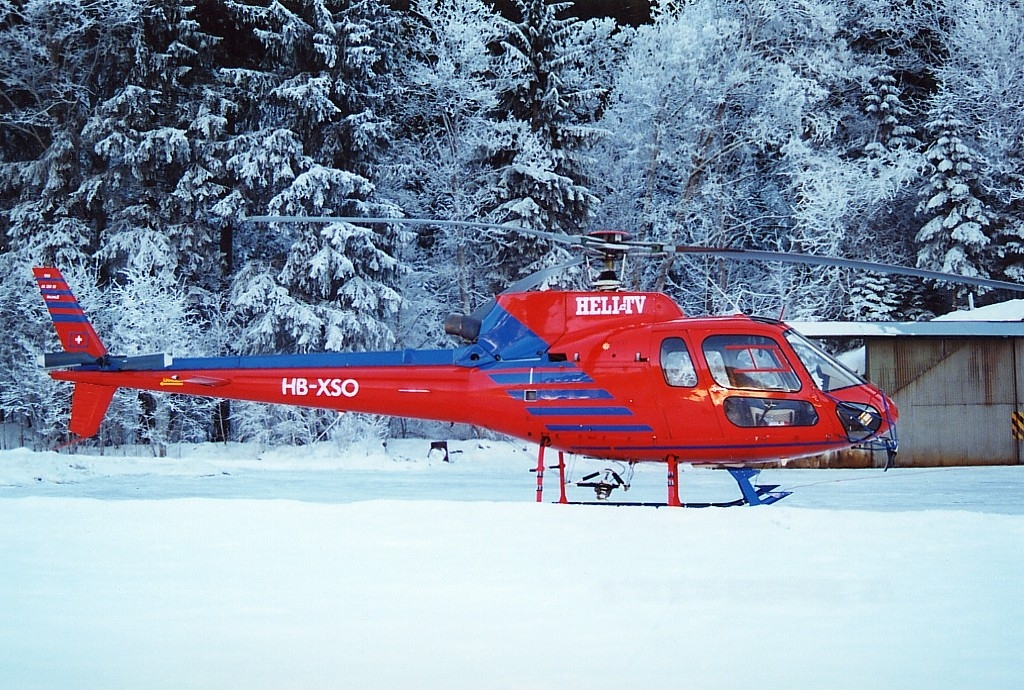
An Aerospatiale AS-350B at Saanen Airport in 2001

- 4 September 1972 - A Minicab GY-20-1 (registration HB-SAC) attempted takeoff from Saanen Airport, but during taxi an increase in power caused the aircraft tail to lift, causing the propeller to impact the ground and the aircraft flipped. The pilot was unharmed.
- 26 August 2010 - A Piper PA-32R-300 (registration HB-PRE) left Saanen Airport to make a private flight with one crew member and two passengers to Zurich. The aircraft failed to gain enough speed and altitude during takeoff, and subsequently impacted with terrain shortly after the end of the runway. The aircraft caught fire subsequently. All three occupants of the aircraft were killed.
- 14 March 2011 - An Eclipse Aircraft Corporation EA500 (registration N177EA) collided with an aircraft de-icer vehicle on the runway following landing. The EA500 was aware of the vehicle presence, but was of the understanding it would vacate the runway. The aircraft failed to stop in time, and the left wing and fuselage impacted with the extended arm of the de-icer. All passengers and crew of the plane, and occupants of the vehicle, survived.
- 6 July 2016 - A Glaser-Dirks DG-800S glider left Saanen Airport on a private flight around the region, due to return to the airport. However, during filming on a cell phone, the pilot lost awareness and impacted terrain causing a fatal accident.
