= Swiss International Air Lines =

National airline of Switzerland

Swiss International Air Lines AG

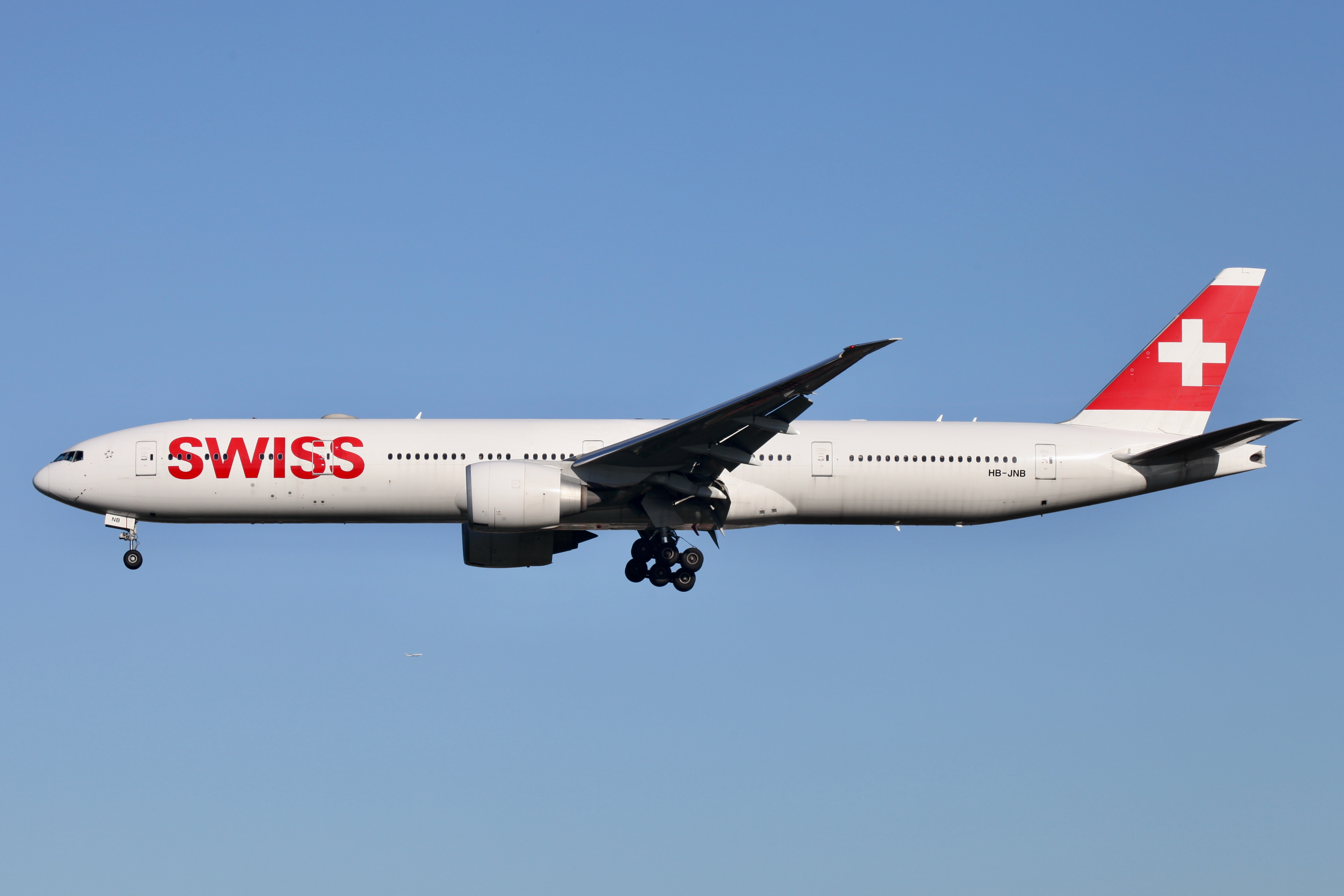
- A SWISS Boeing 777-300ER
IATA	ICAO	Call sign
LX	SWR	SWISS
- Founded: 31 March 2002; 24 years ago
- AOC #: CH.AOC.1006
- Hubs: Zurich Airport
- Secondary hubs: Geneva Airport
- Frequent-flyer program: Miles & More
- Alliance: Star Alliance
- Subsidiaries: Edelweiss Air
- Fleet size: 86
- Destinations: 120
- Parent company: Lufthansa Group
- Headquarters: Obstgartenstrasse 25, near Zurich Airport, Kloten, Switzerland
- Key people: Jens Fehlinger (CEO)
- Revenue: ▲€6,481 million (2025)
- Operating income: ▲€600 million (2025)
- Employees: 11,217 (December 2025)
- Website: swiss.com

Swiss International Air Lines AG, stylised as SWISS, is the flag carrier of Switzerland and a subsidiary of the Lufthansa Group, as well as a Star Alliance member. It operates scheduled services in Europe and to North America, South America, Africa and Asia. Zurich Airport serves as its main hub, and Geneva Airport as its secondary hub.

The company maintains its registered office and operational headquarters in Kloten, near Zurich Airport.

The airline was formed following the bankruptcy in 2002 of Swissair, Switzerland's then-flag carrier. The new airline was built around what had been Swissair's regional subsidiary, Crossair. Swiss retains Crossair's IATA code LX (Swissair's code was SR). It assumed Swissair's old ICAO code of SWR (Crossair's was CRX) to maintain international traffic rights.

== History ==
Swiss International Air Lines' first logo, used from 2002 to 2011.

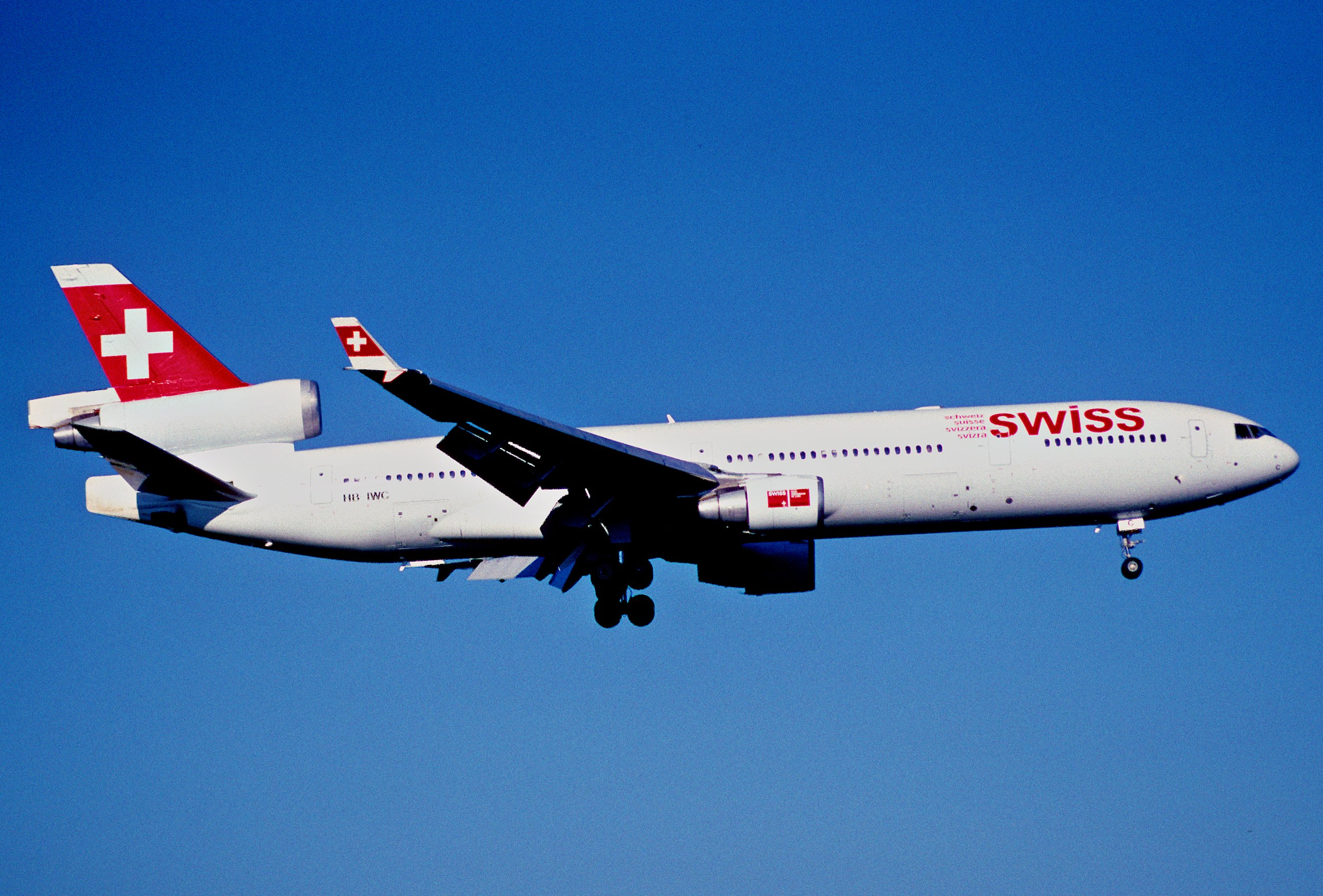
Swiss originally took over several McDonnell Douglas MD-11 from its predecessor.

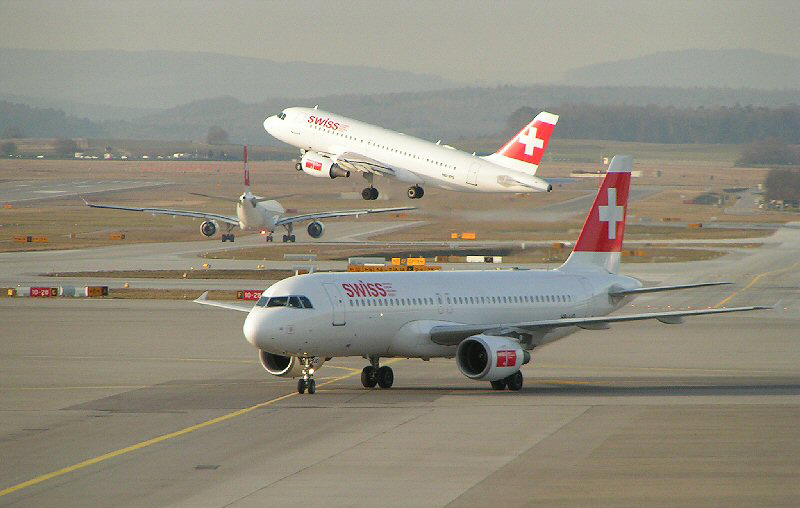
Three Airbus aircraft of Swiss: an A319-100, A320-200, and A330-200, all painted in the airline's first livery.

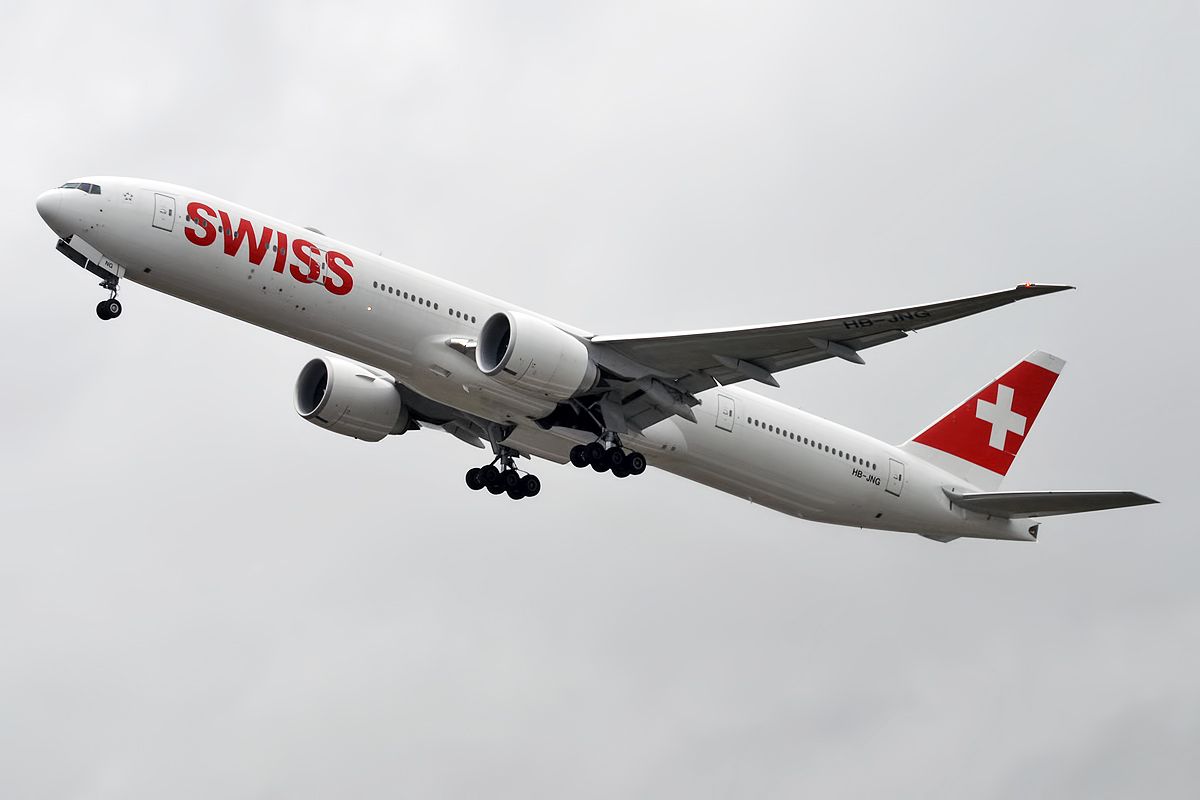
A Swiss Boeing 777-300ER, the airline's largest aircraft, in the revised livery with larger billboard titles.

=== Beginnings ===
Swiss was formed after the 2002 bankruptcy of Swissair, Switzerland's former flag carrier. Forty percent of Crossair's income came from Swissair. The new airline lost US$1.6 billion from 2002 to 2005. Swissair's biggest creditors, Credit Suisse and UBS, sold part of Swissair's assets to Crossair, which had been Swissair's regional counterpart. At the time, both Swissair and Crossair were part of the same holding company, SAirGroup. Crossair later changed its name to Swiss International Air Lines, and the new national airline officially started operations on 31 March 2002. The airline was initially owned by institutional investors (61.3%), the Swiss Confederation (20.3%), cantons and communities (12.2%), and others (6.2%). Swiss also owns subsidiaries Swiss Sun (100%) and Crossair Europe (99.9%). It has a total of 7,383 employees.

According to Marcel Biedermann, the managing director of intercontinental markets for Swiss, there were three possibilities: stay independent as a niche carrier, shrink to an unrecognisable level, or attach to another airline group. The last choice was made. Swiss talked to Air France–KLM, British Airways, and Lufthansa. However, Swiss was tied up with debt and an uncertain future and seemed to be an unattractive investment. After merging with KLM, Air France said they were too busy to deal with the Swiss joining them. British Airways was open, and Oneworld partners thought Zurich Airport would be a viable alternative hub for London Heathrow.

After almost a year of disputes, Swiss was finally accepted into the Oneworld airline alliance, after having been blocked by British Airways, which competes with Swiss on many long-haul routes. On 3 June 2004, Swiss announced its decision not to join Oneworld because they did not want to integrate their current frequent flyer programme into British Airways' Executive Club. Furthermore, Swiss thought the relationship was one-sided, where British Airways drained the benefits of the airline, but they would get no return.

=== Recovery ===
The airline annually halved its losses and in 2006 recorded a net profit of $220 million. The net profit for 2007 was $570 million. Biedermann stated in the March 2008 edition of Airways that "this was the beginning of getting our house back in order." He expressed the need for assistance and cited Lufthansa as a model, indicating a natural convergence despite their differences. Even with the smaller network, Swiss carried the same number of passengers as it did in 2002.

On 22 March 2005, Lufthansa Group confirmed its plan to take over Swiss, starting with a minority stake (11%) in a new company set up to hold Swiss shares called Air Trust. Swiss operations were gradually integrated with Lufthansa's in late 2005, and the takeover was completed on 1 July 2007. Swiss joined Star Alliance and became a member of Lufthansa's Miles & More frequent flyer program on 1 April 2006.

The airline set up a regional airline subsidiary called Swiss European Air Lines. The carrier had its own air operator's certificate. Swiss also owns two divisions – Swiss Aviation Training and Swiss WorldCargo (which uses the belly capacity of passenger planes). Swiss European Air Lines (later renamed Swiss Global Air Lines) has since ceased operations and merged with its parent, Swiss.

In 2008, Swiss International Air Lines acquired Edelweiss Air and Servair, later renamed Swiss Private Aviation. In February 2011, Swiss Private Aviation ceased operations as a result of restructuring. The company recommended using Lufthansa Private Jet Service instead.

In 2007, Swiss ordered nine Airbus A330-300s to gradually replace existing A330-200s and have three-class seating. The first A330-300 was put into service on the flagship Zürich to New York-JFK route in April 2009. In spring 2010, Swiss International operated five A330-300s on medium- and long-haul routes. The remaining four A330-300 aircraft joined the fleet in 2011.

=== Takeover by Lufthansa ===
Following Lufthansa Group's takeover, the regional fleet was changed from Crossair's Embraer ERJs, Saab 340s, and 2000s to Avro RJs, which were flown by a wholly owned subsidiary, Swiss Global Air Lines. The rest of the fleet was rationalised and now mainly consists of Airbus aircraft, apart from the Boeing 777. Swiss also renegotiated their supplier contracts, including ground handling, maintenance, food service, and labour. Swiss shareholders received a performance-based option for their shares. The payment was in 2008, and the amount depended on how well Lufthansa's shares compared with competitors' shares. Lufthansa continues to maintain Swiss as a separate brand.

In 2010, Swiss and Lufthansa were named in a European Commission investigation into price-fixing but were not fined due to acting as a whistleblower.

On 18 August 2011, Swiss introduced a new company logo which resembled the logo of the defunct Swissair.

=== COVID-19 losses and bailout ===
The COVID-19 pandemic severely affected Swiss International Air Lines. It reported revenues for 2020 of CHF 1.85 billion, which were 65.2% below its prior-year level.

In August 2020, Swiss International Air Lines received a CHF1.5 billion ($1.65 billion) state-backed loan from the Swiss government to weather the pandemic. The use of Swiss state funds was criticised by some commentators because Swiss is a fully owned subsidiary of German airline Lufthansa, making questions regarding its survival the responsibility of the German government, which had similarly lent a helping hand to Lufthansa during the pandemic.

On 18 November 2020, it was announced that Dieter Vranckx would assume the position of CEO as of 1 January 2021. Vranckx has 20 years of experience within the Lufthansa Group and has been CEO of Lufthansa Group member Brussels Airlines since the start of 2020.

In June 2024, it was announced that Vranckx would step down by the end of the month and be replaced by German national and Lufthansa CityLine Managing Director, Jens Fehlinger. Heike Birlenbach, the Chief Commercial Officer, temporarily led Swiss until Fehlinger took office in October 2024. Dieter Vranckx transferred to the executive board of parent company Lufthansa on 1 July 2024 and remains with Swiss as vice chairman of its board of directors.

=== Expansion of flight operations ===
On 16 January 2025, it was reported that Swiss would resume its flight operations to Tel Aviv from 1 February 2025. The airline would fly daily from Zurich to Tel Aviv using its Airbus A320 aircraft.

== Corporate affairs ==
=== Business trends ===
The key trends for Swiss International Air Lines are (as of the financial year ending 31 December):

	Revenue (€m)	Operating income (Note: "Adjusted EBIT") (€m)	Number of employees (Note: at year end)	Number of passengers (m)	Load factor (%)	Fleet size (Note: including Edelweiss Air)	References
2011	3,942	259	7,918	16.3	81.1	93	
2012	4,220	191	8,378	16.9	82.4	92	
2013	4,223		8,647	17.0	83.3	94	
2014	4,241	278	8,694	17.2	83.3	92	
2015	4,542	429	9,009	17.5	82.8	88	
2016	4,471	414	9,409	17.9	80.2	89	
2017	4,727	542	9,497	18.6	81.4	91	
2018	4,870	593	9,941	20.4	83.1	105	
2019	5,144	558	10,531	21.5	83.9	107	
2020	1,732	−689	10,055	5.6	60.8	109	(Note: 2020: Activities and income in fiscal 2020 were severely reduced by the impact of the coronavirus pandemic)
2021	2,098	−417	8,743	7.1	56.8	107	
2022	4,805	476	9,045	15.0	79.8	107	
2023	5,905	809	9,909	19.3	84.4	109	
2024	6,472	801	10,870	21.0	84.0	112	
2025	6,481	600	11,217	21.4	83.0	116	

=== Head office ===
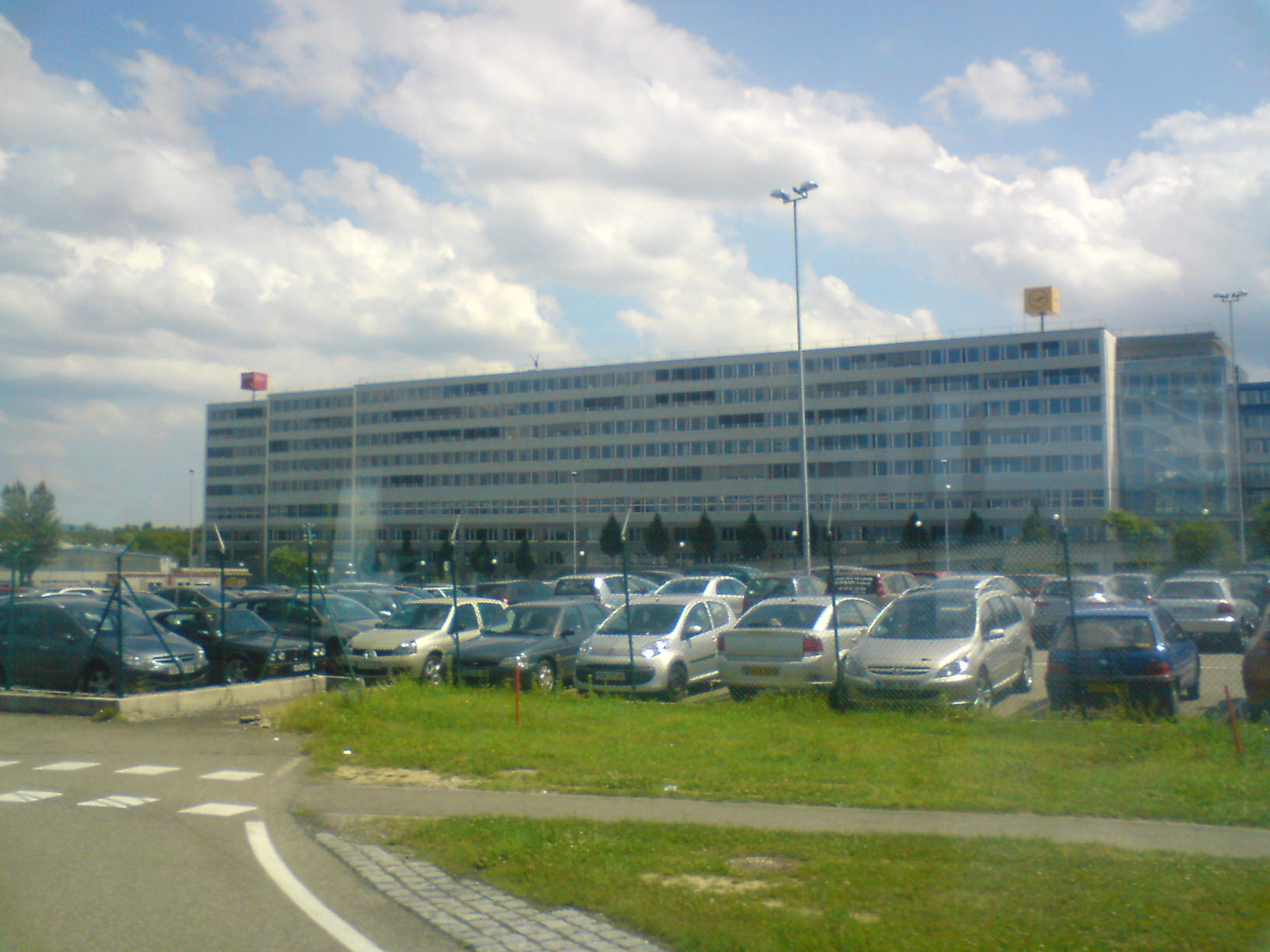
The former Swiss International Air Lines head office at EuroAirport Basel Mulhouse Freiburg.

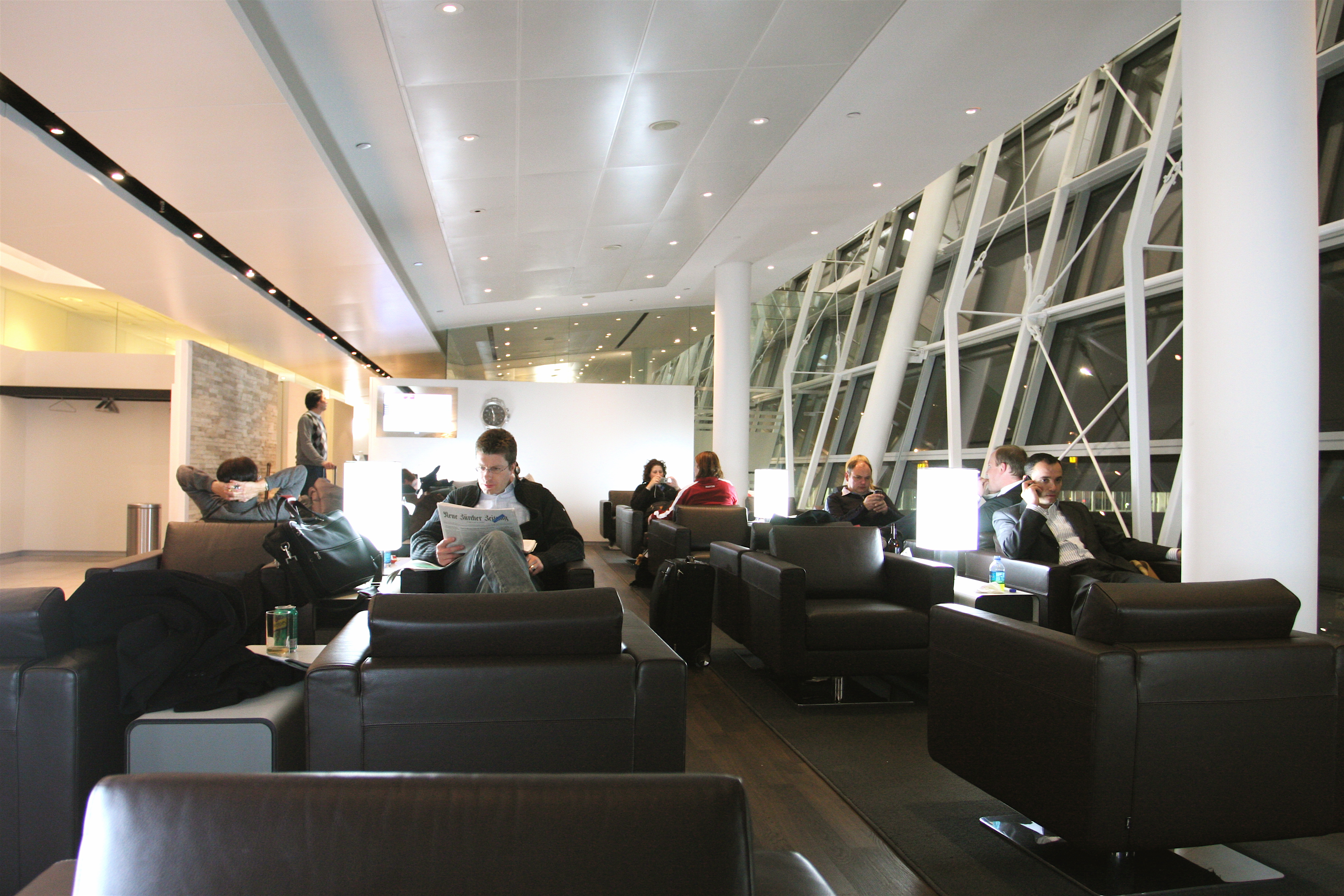
Swiss' lounge at John F. Kennedy International Airport.

Swiss International Air Lines has its operational headquarters at Kloten Airport, where it also maintains its registered office.

It previously had its operational headquarters on the grounds of EuroAirport Basel Mulhouse Freiburg near Basel, Switzerland. The French-Swiss airport is located on French territory and has customs-free access to Switzerland. The former Swiss head office is located in the Swiss section of the airport, and it is only accessible from Switzerland. According to the commercial register, the legal seat was in Basel itself.

The head office of Swiss International Air Lines was formerly the head office of Crossair. In 2002 the "Crossair" sign on the building was replaced by a "Swiss International Air Lines" one. As of 2004, the Basel area offices housed about 1,000 employees, while the Zurich area offices housed about 850 employees. When Swiss started as a company, about 1,400–1,500 worked at the Basel offices. Circa 2014, the CEO of Swiss planned to move his primary office from Basel Airport to Kloten Airport, while the former would be a secondary office.

Swiss also operates offices at Geneva Airport.

=== Subsidiaries ===
The following companies are part of the Swiss International Air Lines Group:

- Edelweiss Air
- Swiss AviationSoftware
- Swiss Aviation Training
- Swiss WorldCargo
- SWISStours

=== In-flight service ===
On European flights, Swiss serves drinks. Depending on the time of day and the duration of the flight, Swiss may also serve snacks. Cold snacks are served on shorter flights, and hot ones on longer flights. Economy class on short-haul flights only includes a bottle of water and a small bar of Swiss chocolate branded with the word "SWISS", and the distinctive tail fin is provided to passengers before landing on all flights. For its short- to mid-haul flights out of Geneva Airport and Zürich Airport, SWISS has a buy-on-board system called Swiss Saveurs.

=== Trains and buses ===
Swiss' SWISS Air Rail service allows passengers to take any SBB train at no extra charge from Zurich Airport to Basel SBB railway station and Lugano railway station. Swiss previously operated a Swissbus service from Ottawa Railway Station to Montréal–Trudeau airport in Montreal.

== Partners ==
=== Other Lufthansa Group airlines ===
Swiss is part of the Lufthansa Group, which also owns the following airlines:

- Austrian Airlines
- Brussels Airlines
- Discover Airlines
- Eurowings
- Lufthansa
- ITA Airways

=== Joint venture agreements ===
Swiss has the following joint venture agreements:

- Atlantic Joint Venture among Air Canada, United Airlines, Austrian Airlines, Lufthansa, SWISS, Brussels Airlines and Eurowings
- Europe Singapore Pacific Joint Venture among Singapore Airlines, Austrian Airlines, Brussels Airlines, Lufthansa, and SWISS
- Europe Japan Joint Venture among All Nippon Airways, Austrian Airlines, Lufthansa and SWISS
- Europe China Joint Venture among Air China, Shenzhen Airlines, Austrian Airlines, Lufthansa, and SWISS

=== Codeshare agreements ===
Swiss codeshares with the following airlines:

- Air Canada
- Air China
- Air France
- Air India
- Airlink
- All Nippon Airways
- Asiana Airlines
- Austrian Airlines
- Avianca
- Bangkok Airways
- Brussels Airlines
- Cathay Pacific
- Croatia Airlines
- Discover Airlines
- Edelweiss Air (Subsidiary)
- Egyptair
- El Al
- Eurowings
- ITA Airways
- KM Malta Airlines
- LOT Polish Airlines
- Lufthansa
- Singapore Airlines
- South African Airways
- TAP Air Portugal
- Thai Airways International
- United Airlines

=== Interline agreements ===
Swiss has interline agreements with the following airlines:

- Aerolíneas Argentinas
- Aeroméxico
- Air Austral
- Air Dolomiti
- Air Mauritius
- American Airlines
- Bangkok Airways
- British Airways
- China Airlines
- China Eastern Airlines
- China Southern Airlines
- Condor
- Delta Air Lines
- Emirates
- Finnair
- Gol Linhas Aéreas Inteligentes
- Gulf Air
- Hahn Air
- Helvetic Airways
- Iberia
- Icelandair
- Japan Airlines
- Jetstar
- Kenya Airways
- KLM
- Korean Air
- LATAM Chile
- Luxair
- Malaysia Airlines
- Mandarin Airlines
- Middle East Airlines
- Oman Air
- Pakistan International Airlines
- Precision Air
- Qantas
- Qatar Airways
- Rossiya Airlines
- Saudia
- Scoot
- Shanghai Airlines
- SunExpress
- SriLankan Airlines
- Turkish Airlines
- Vietnam Airlines
- Virgin Atlantic
- Virgin Australia

== Fleet ==
=== Current fleet ===
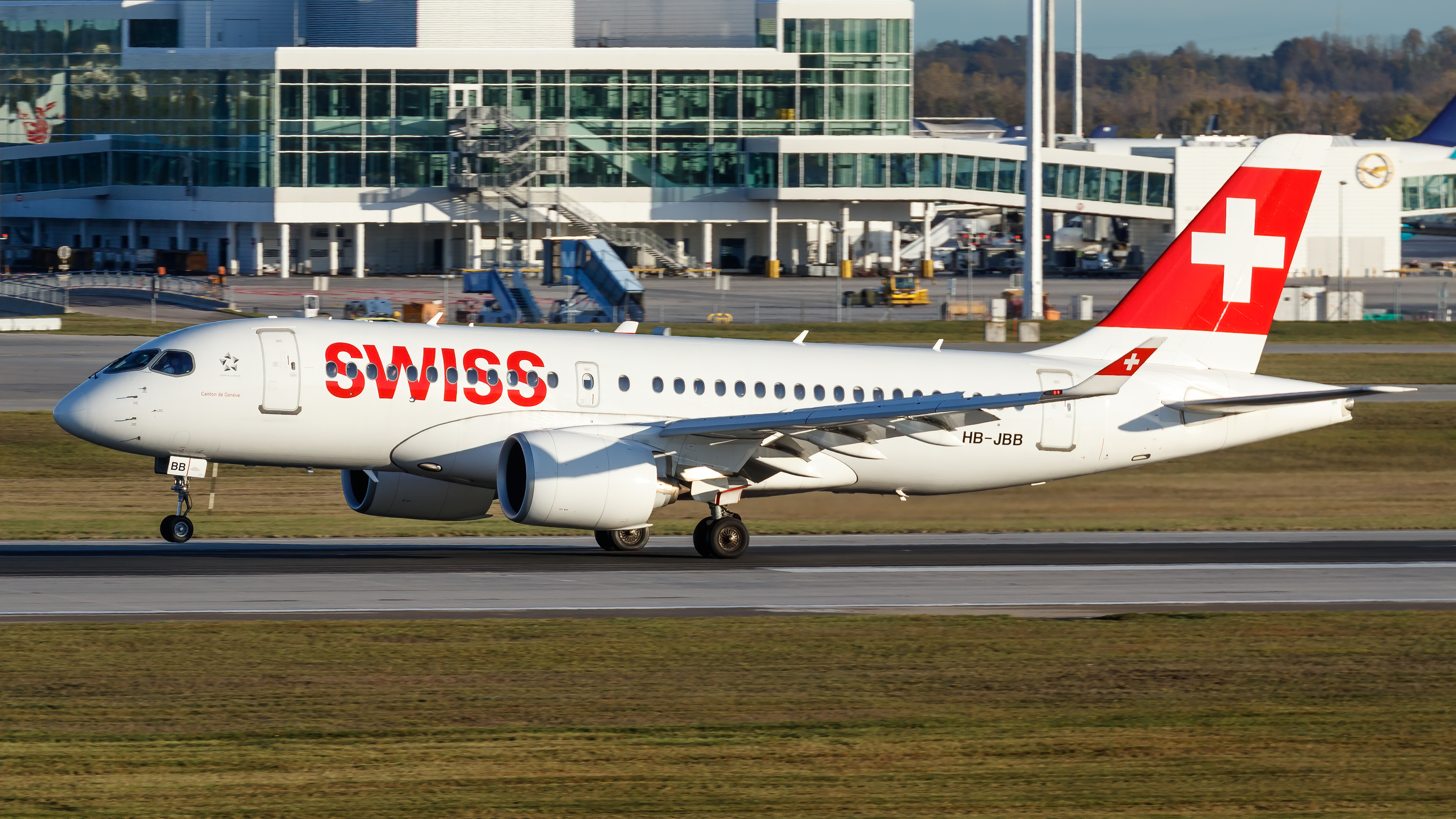
A220-100

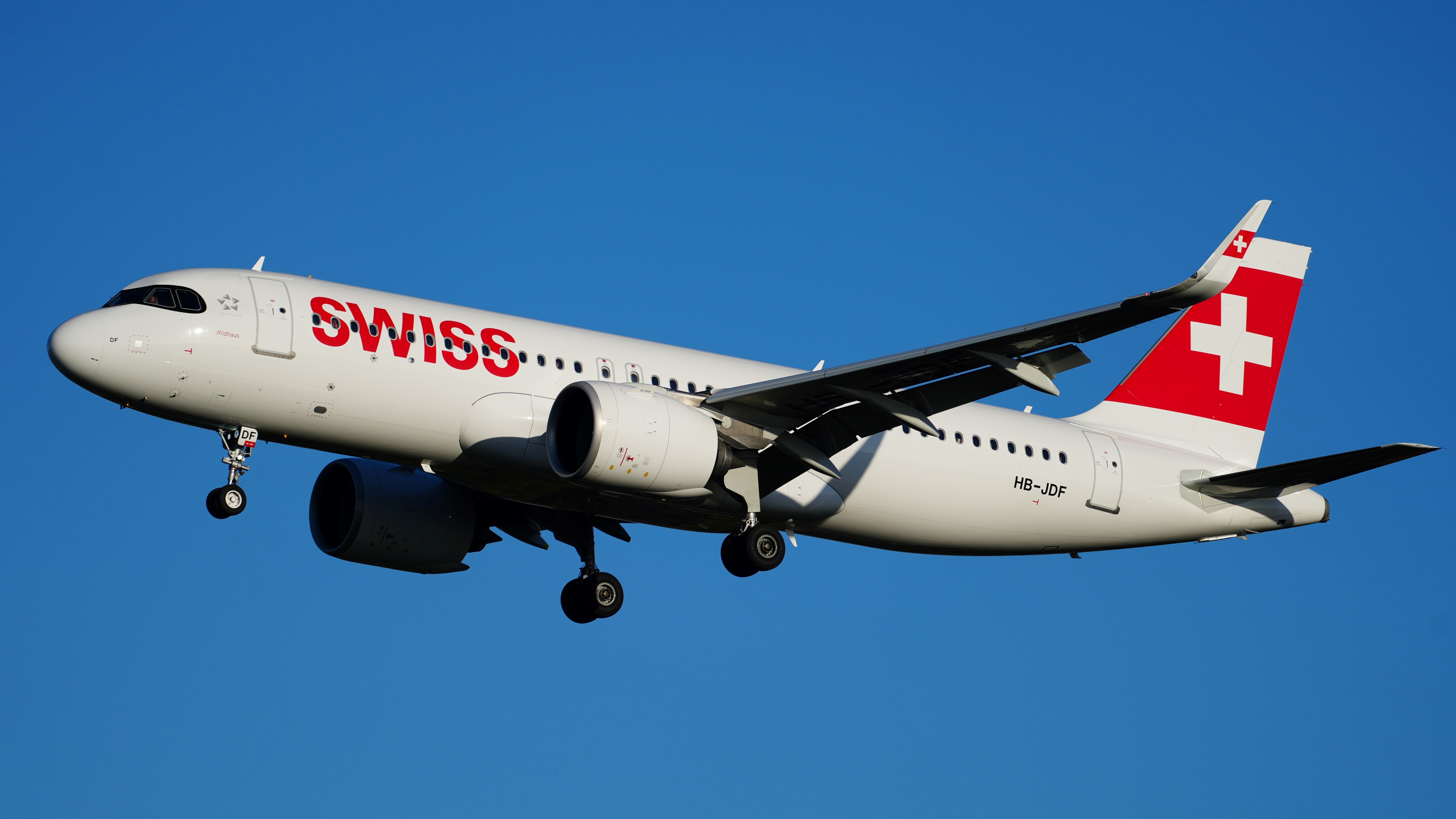
Airbus A320neo

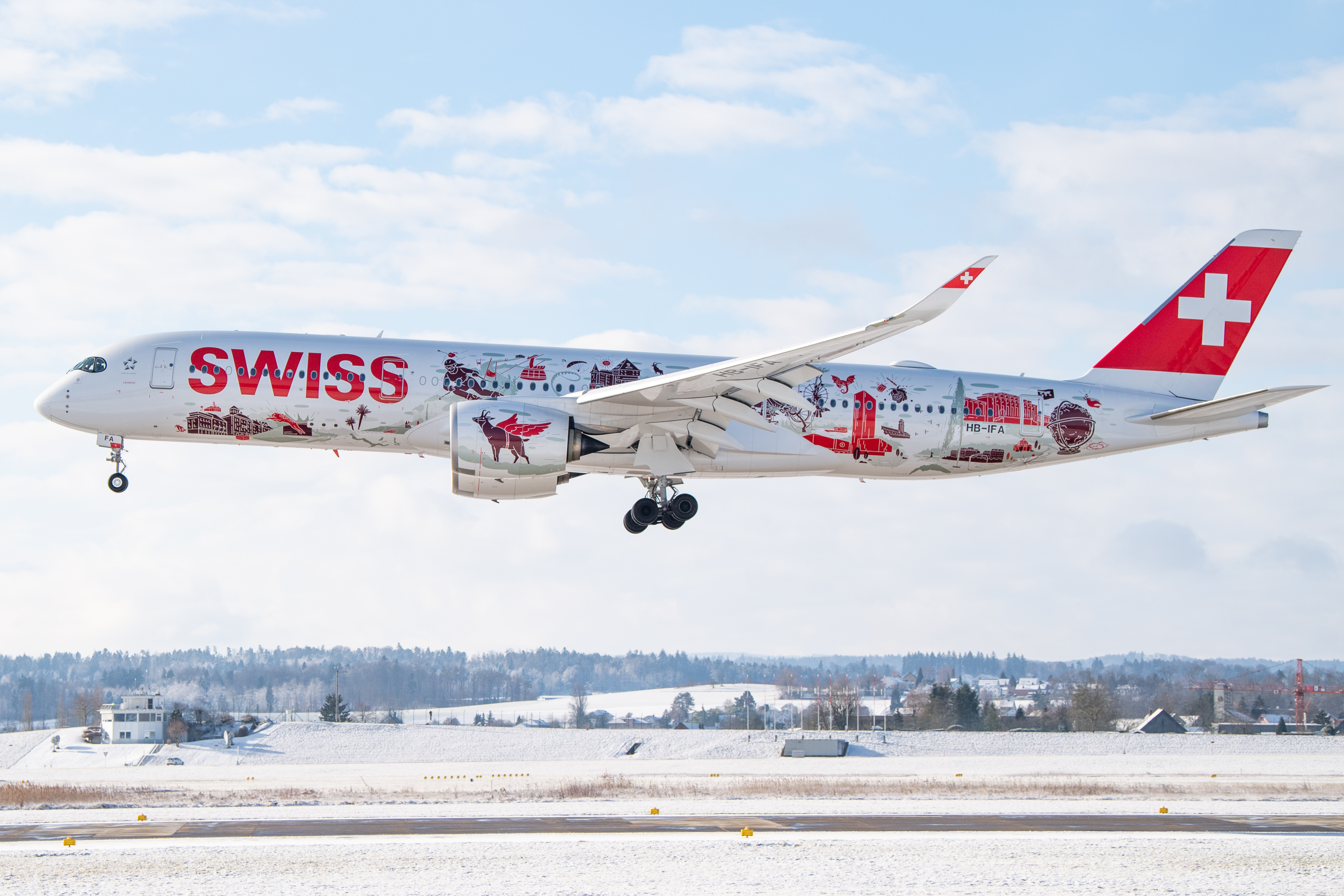
Airbus A350-900

As of July 2026, Swiss International Air Lines operates the following aircraft:

Swiss International Air Lines fleet
Aircraft	In service	Orders	Passengers						Notes
Aircraft	In service	Orders	F	B	P	E	Total	Ref.	Notes
Airbus A220-100	3	—	—	—	—	125	125		Launch customer. Fleet grounded due to Pratt & Whitney PW1500G engine issues, to be subsequently retired by 2027.
Airbus A220-300	21	—	—	—	—	145	145		To be retired.
Airbus A320-200	6	—	—	—	—	180	180		
Airbus A320neo	11	4	—	—	—	180	180		Original order for ten with seven options to firm orders.
Airbus A321-100	3	—	—	—	—	219	219		
Airbus A321-200	3	—	—	—	—	219	219		
Airbus A321neo	7	2	—	—	—	219	219		Original order for five with three options to firm orders. Some orders can be changed to Airbus A321LR.
Airbus A330-300	14	—	8	45	—	183	236		To be retrofitted with SWISS Senses interior.
Airbus A330-300	—	—	4	43	21	159	227		Future configuration.
Airbus A340-300	4	—	8	42	21	144	215		To be retired by 2028 and replaced by Airbus A350-900.
Airbus A350-900	2	8	3	45	38	156	242		Deliveries since October 2025 as part of a Lufthansa order to replace Airbus A340-300.
Boeing 777-300ER	12	—	8	62	24	226	320		To be retrofitted with SWISS Senses interior.
Total	86	14							

Additionally, Helvetic Airways operates ten Embraer E190s on behalf of Swiss. Following Helvetic Airways' acquisition of the type, Helvetic Airways will also operate Embraer 190-E2 aircraft on behalf of Swiss.

=== Former fleet ===
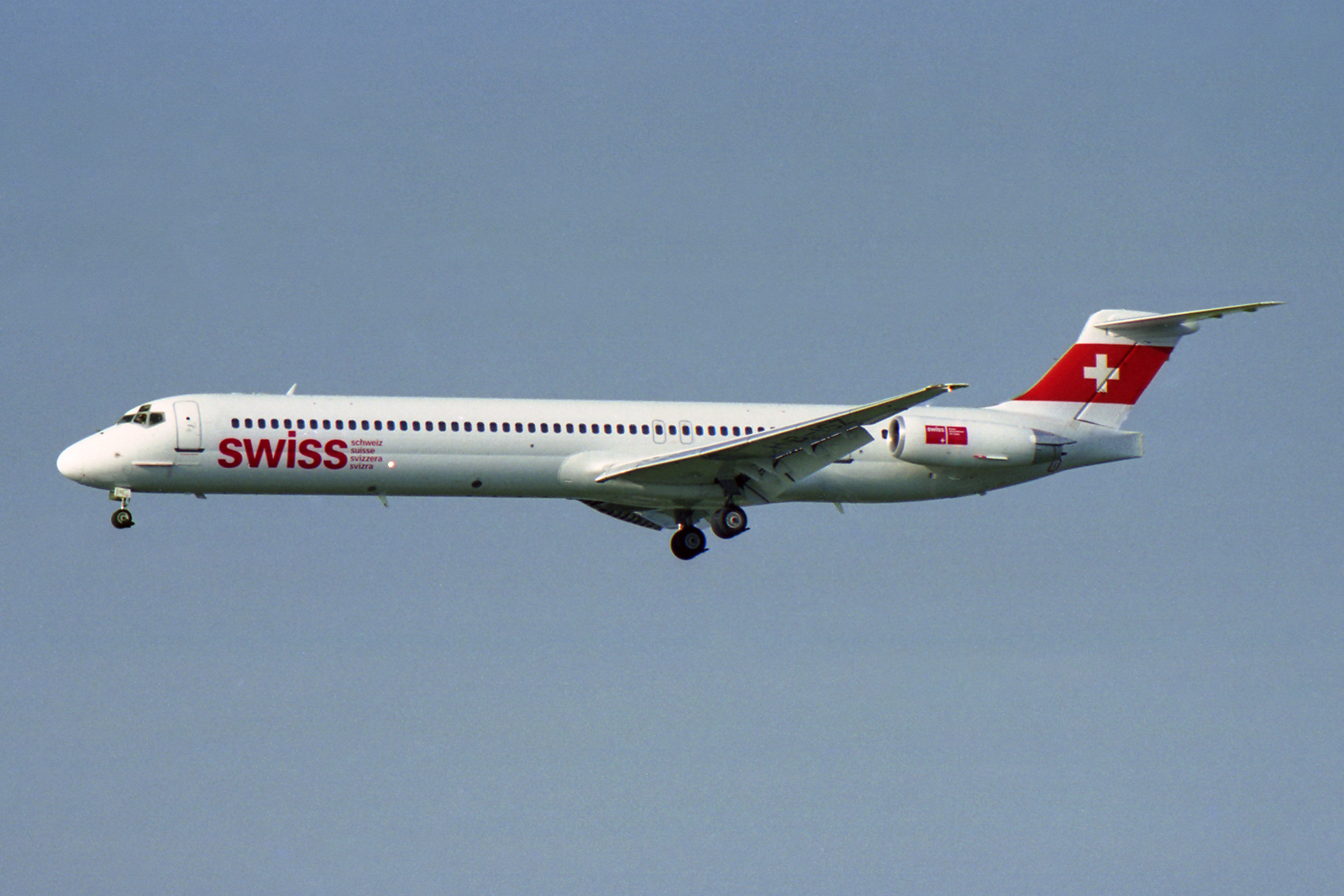
Former MD-83 in 2003

Historically, Swiss has also operated these aircraft:

- Airbus A319
- Airbus A330-200
- Avro RJ85 (operated by Swiss Global Air Lines)
- Avro RJ100 (operated by Swiss Global Air Lines)
- Embraer ERJ-145
- McDonnell Douglas MD-11
- McDonnell Douglas MD-83
- Saab 2000

=== Fleet development ===
On 22 September 2010, Lufthansa announced an order for 48 new aircraft, several of them for Swiss.

In March 2013, Swiss ordered six Boeing 777-300ERs. On 12 March 2015, Swiss confirmed Lufthansa Group had ordered an additional three Boeing 777-300ERs for Swiss. The 777s will be operated by, and leased back from, Swiss Global Air Lines. Swiss has confirmed that all 777-300ERs will have an updated First Class cabin with eight private suites and a 32-inch TV, 62 business class seats which convert into a fully flat bed that is over two metres long, and 270 economy seats, with 10 seats abreast in a 3-4-3 layout, using the same seat pitch and width on its A330s and A340s on the 777s. The first of these new airliners was delivered in January 2016. The Boeing aircraft will replace most of Swiss' A340 aircraft, while the remaining five A340s were refurbished.

In 2014, Swiss announced it would refurbish its A320 fleet with new interiors, and the older A320s and A321s were to be replaced by A320/A321neos. The A319s and Swiss Global Air Lines' Avro fleet were replaced by Bombardier CS300 aircraft. The last Avro RJ100 aircraft, HB-IYZ, completed its final flight, LX7545 from Geneva to Zurich, on 15 August 2017.

Swiss' first Airbus A220, then known as the Bombardier CS300, entered service on 1 June 2017, with its maiden commercial flight from Geneva to London–Heathrow. Swiss was the launch customer of the Airbus A220 family (formerly known as the Bombardier CSeries), with its first CSeries aircraft, a CS100 (A220-100), delivered to the airline in June 2016 and registered HB-JBA. The first commercial flight performed led from Zurich to Paris-Charles de Gaulle.

The Boeing 777-300ER and Airbus A220-100/-300 (Bombardier CS100/CS300) aircraft were operated by Swiss Global Air Lines until the subsidiary ceased operations in April 2018 in an attempt to lower administration costs and simplify Swiss' fleet structuring.

Adria Airways operated two Saab 2000s on the Zurich-Lugano route, which was suspended after Adria's bankruptcy on 30 September 2019.

In December 2024, it was reported that Swiss will be receiving a further five Airbus A350-900 widebody long-haul aircraft from 2027 onwards, on top of another five aircraft which are on order, with gradual delivery between the summer of 2025 and 2031.

On 9 October 2025, the first Airbus A350-900 arrived in Zurich, with its first regular flight to Boston scheduled for late November. Main improvements of the A350 cabin include larger screens for passengers, an updated in-flight-entertainment system with access to cameras on the aircraft, and the ability to pair personal bluetooth headphones.

== Accidents and incidents ==
- On 10 July 2002, Swiss International Air Lines Flight 850, a Saab 2000, crashed at Werneuchen Airfield due to improper weather information and improper markings on the runway, resulting in the collapse of the landing gear and fire spreading throughout the aircraft. Though everyone on board survived, the aircraft was written off.
- On 23 December 2024, an Airbus A220-300 (HB-JCD), operating as Swiss International Air Lines Flight 1885 from Bucharest to Zurich, had to make an emergency landing at Graz Airport due to smoke development in the cabin. The aircraft was evacuated using the emergency slides, and 17 passengers and 5 crew members were hospitalised. SWISS announced on 30 December 2024 that one of the flight attendants had died in the hospital.
- On 25 April 2026, Flight 147, operated by a Airbus A330-300 (registered HB-JHK) flying from Indira Gandhi International Airport, New Delhi for Zurich, aborted take-off due to an engine fire. The Captain ordered emergency evacuation, and 6 people out of 245 passengers and crew were injured and hospitalized.

== Other sources ==
- "Lufthansa Group 3rd Interim report 2013" (PDF).
- Ken Donohue, "Swiss continues a proud tradition", Airways Magazine: A Global Review of Commercial Flight, March 2008, 22–23, 25, 28.
