= Swiss Global Air Lines =

Regional airline of Switzerland (2005–2018)

IATA	ICAO	Call sign
LZ	SWU	EUROSWISS
- Founded: 1 September 2005 (as Swiss European Air Lines)
- Commenced operations: 1 November 2005 (as Swiss European Air Lines); 3 February 2015 (as Swiss Global Air Lines)
- Ceased operations: 19 April 2018 (re-integrated into Swiss International Air Lines)
- AOC #: CH.AOC.1044
- Hubs: Zurich Airport
- Frequent-flyer program: Miles & More
- Alliance: Star Alliance (affiliate; 2006–2018)
- Parent company: Swiss International Air Lines
- Headquarters: Basel, Switzerland
- Key people: Andreas Thurnheer
- Website: www.swiss.com

Swiss Global Air Lines, known as Swiss European Air Lines until February 2015, was a Swiss airline and a wholly owned subsidiary of Swiss International Air Lines.

Like its parent, Swiss Global was part of the Star Alliance. It had its legal headquarters in Basel; the physical head office was on the grounds of Zürich Airport and the town of Kloten. Swiss Global Air Lines operated scheduled flights in the name and corporate design of its parent Swiss International to European metropolitan and some leisure destinations from Zurich Airport as well as some long-haul routes on behalf of its parent.

By 19 April 2018, all aircraft and employees were transferred to the parent company as part of a new labour agreement. Therefore, Swiss Global Air Lines was dissolved.

== History ==
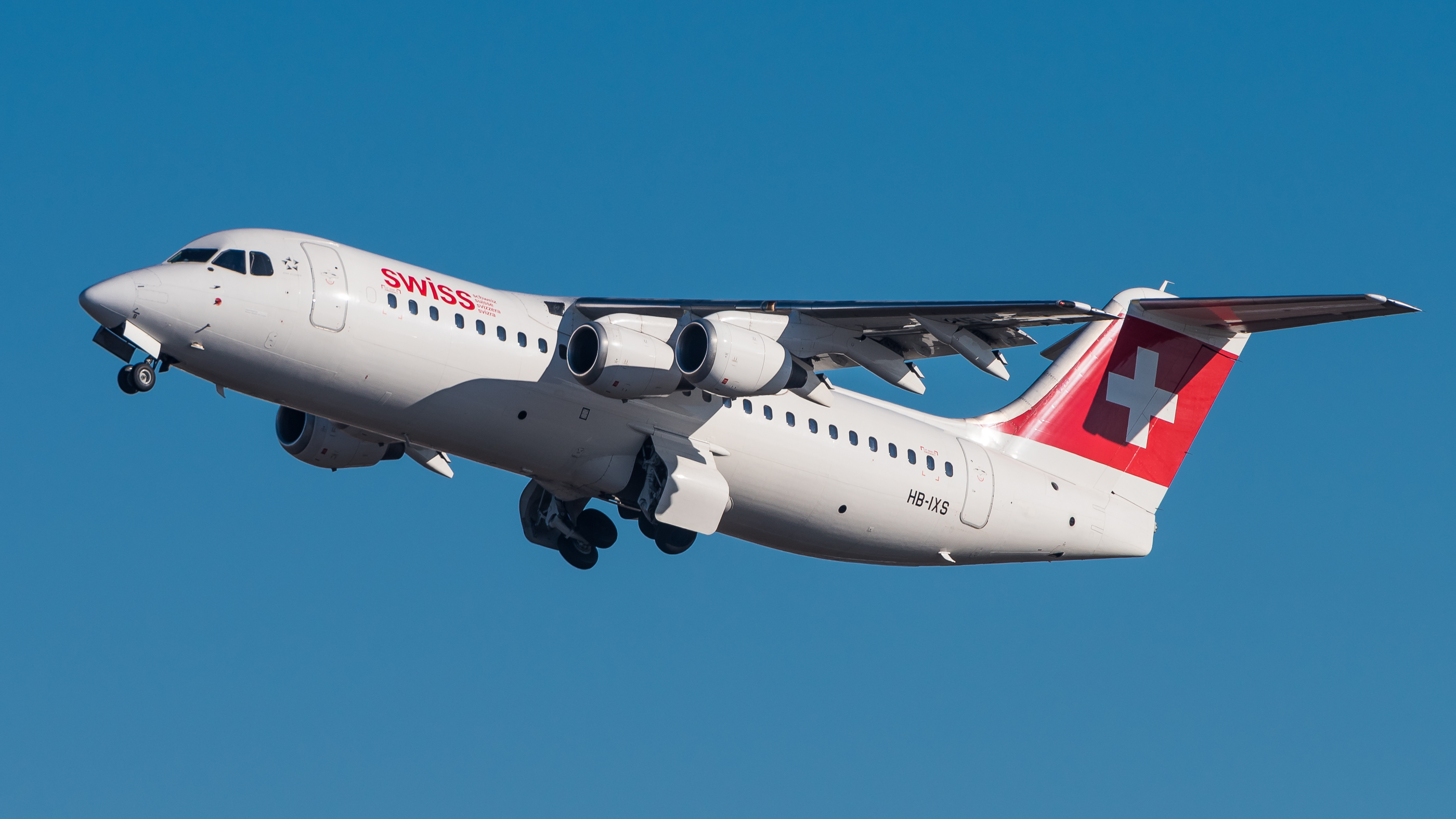
The Avro RJ100 was Swiss European Air Lines' primary aircraft until the start of its replacement in 2016

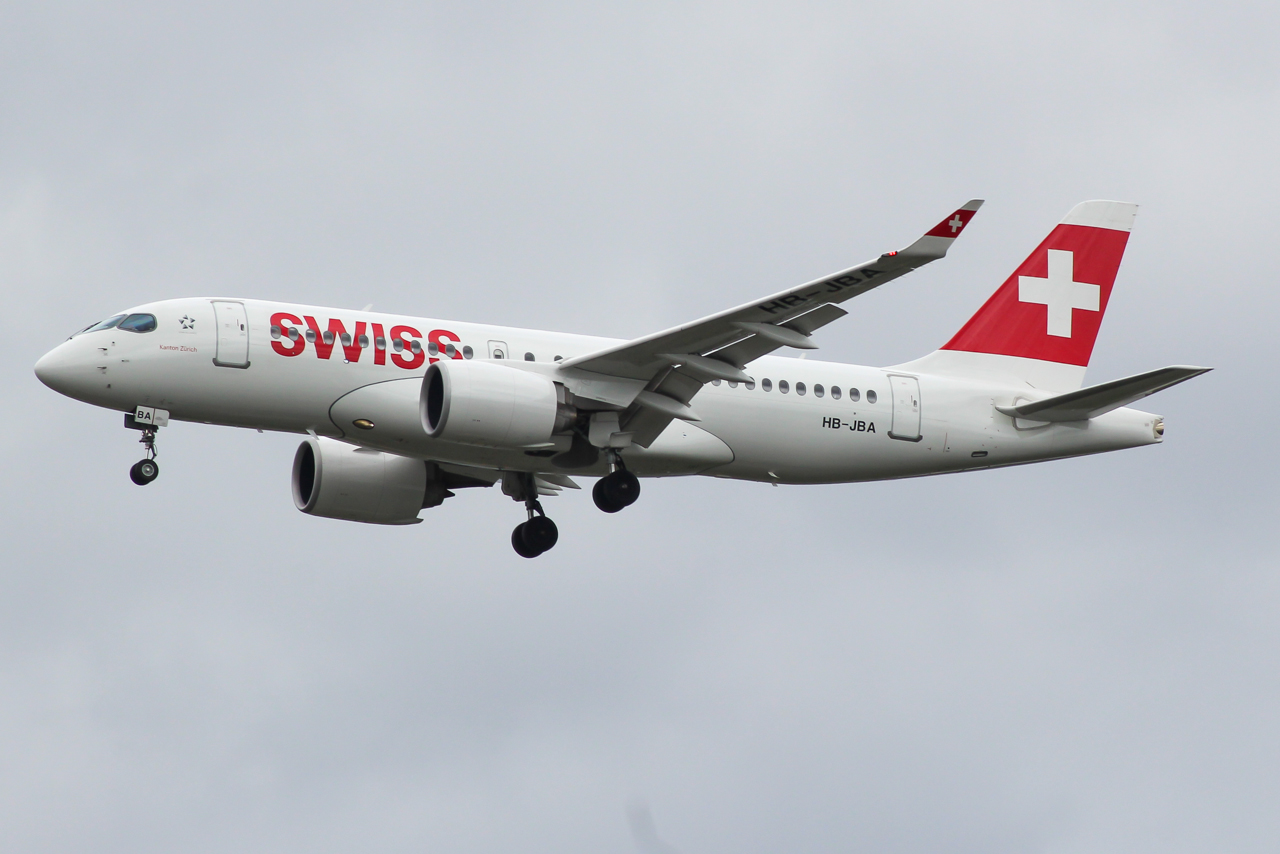
Swiss Global Air Lines Bombardier CS100

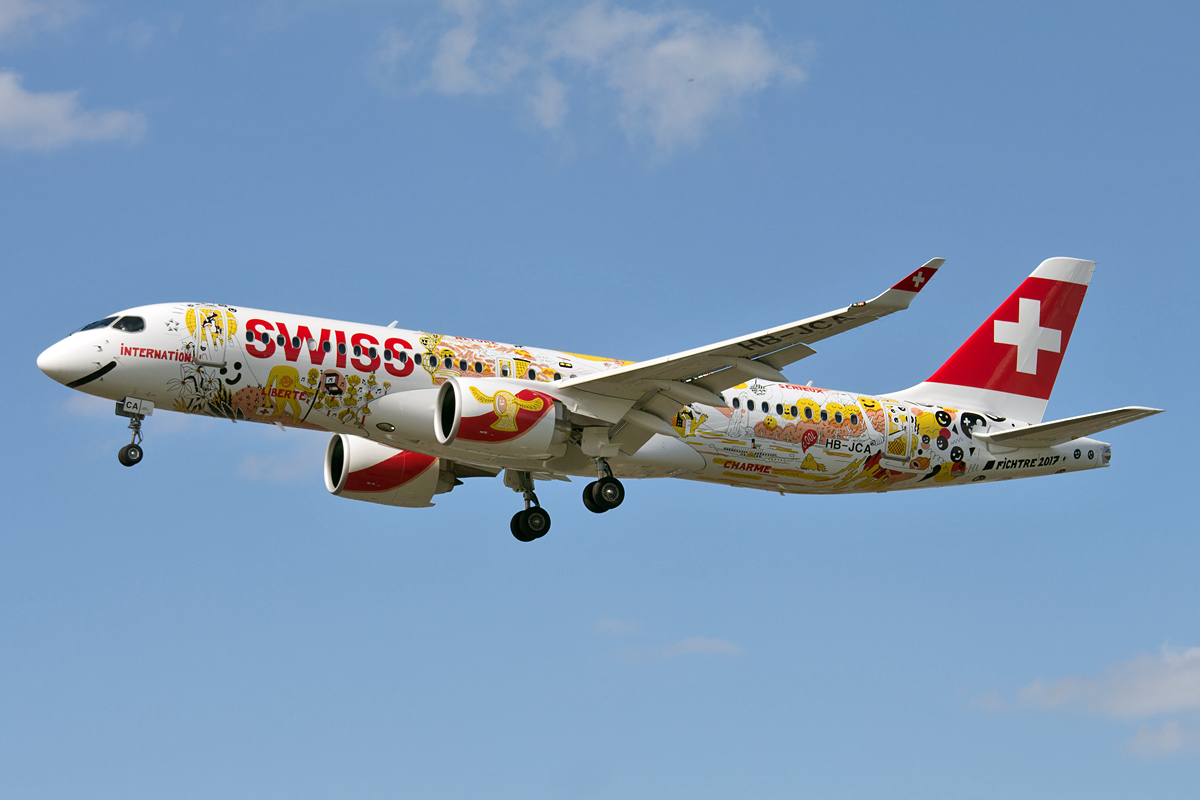
Swiss Global Air Lines Bombardier CS300 sporting the Fête des Vignerons livery

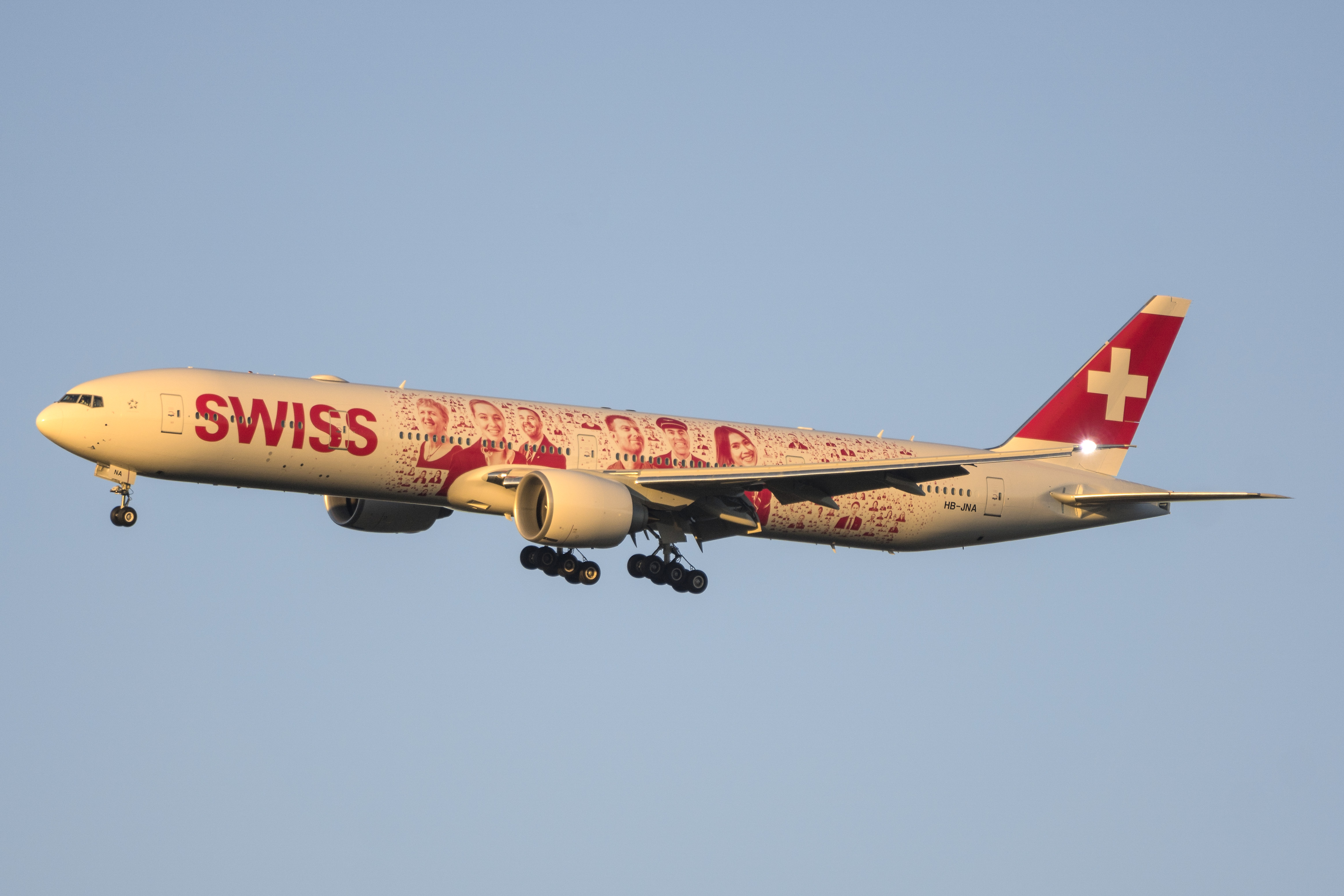
Swiss Global Air Lines Boeing 777-300ER "Faces of SWISS"

Swiss Global Air Lines was founded in 2005 as Swiss European Air Lines, to operate European routes for its parent company. It started operations on 1 November 2005 with a fleet of 18 Avro RJ85/RJ100 and 8 Embraer 145.

On 11 March 2009, the Lufthansa Group board announced that it planned to gradually replace the current Avro RJ100 fleet flown by Swiss Global with aircraft of the Bombardier CSeries from 2014. The replacement of the twenty RJ100s was planned to take two years, while an additional ten aircraft would be delivered thereafter to allow for capacity expansion. The new aircraft would allow Swiss to continue serving restricted destinations such as London City Airport or Florence Perétola Airport. With the delays to the Bombardier CSeries' development this date was postponed to 2015. It was further postponed, with the first delivery, of a CS100, taking place in June 2016 with the first revenue flight on 15 July. The Lufthansa Group is a launch customer for this aircraft type, and had previously signed a letter of intent for up to 60 aircraft.

In December 2014, Swiss announced it would cease operations from EuroAirport Basel Mulhouse Freiburg altogether by 31 May 2015, including Swiss Global Air Lines' operations there; and subsequently concentrated on its operations in Zurich.

On 3 February 2015, Swiss International Air Lines announced the rebranding of Swiss European Air Lines to Swiss Global Air Lines.

It was also confirmed on the same date, that Swiss International's six ordered Boeing 777-300ERs would be operated by Swiss Global Air Lines. These are the first aircraft for intercontinental flights in Swiss Global Air Lines' fleet. A further three Boeing 777-300ER aircraft were ordered in 2015, bringing the commitment up to nine aircraft. By April 2015, Swiss Global Air Lines requested traffic rights for flights to the United States to utilize the 777s on its parent's intercontinental routes. The rights were granted by June 2015 and first used for flights to New York City from 2016.

At the 2015 Paris Air Show, the airline announced it was switching 10 of its 30 orders for the Bombardier CS100 to the larger Bombardier CS300. Another 5 orders for CS100 were converted to CS300 on 4 June 2016. On 29 June 2016, Swiss Global received its first CS100 as the worldwide launch customer. The first revenue service took place on 15 July 2016 from Zürich to Paris.

In March 2017, Swiss converted another five CS100 orders to CS300 orders, for a fleet of 10 CS100 and 20 CS300 aircraft by the end of 2018. Swiss also holds options for up to 30 additional CSeries aircraft.

On 14 August 2017, the final remaining Swiss Avro RJ100 aircraft, registered HB-IYZ, completed its last regular flight from London City Airport to Zurich, followed by a special flight from Geneva to Zurich for a formal retirement the next day. A total of 24 Avro RJ100 aircraft had been a part of the Swiss fleet since 2002. In 2017, following the delivery of Swiss Global's first Bombardier CS300, parent company (Swiss International Air Lines) CEO Thomas Klühr announced that Swiss' Western Switzerland Base - Geneva fleet would consist of only Bombardier CSeries aircraft by the end of 2018, wholly operated by Swiss Global Air Lines, instead of Airbus A320 family aircraft.

On 14 August 2017, the final revenue RJ100 flight occurred, with the aircraft's formal retirement from Swiss service the following day.

On 5 April 2018, it was announced that Swiss Global Air Lines would be dissolved, and all aircraft and employees were transferred to parent company Swiss International Air Lines by 19 April. The reason for this is considered to be the new labour agreement harmonizing pilot compensation across both companies that took effect on 1 April, negating the cost advantages of Swiss Global Airlines.

== Fleet ==
=== Last fleet ===
When Swiss Global Air Lines ceased operations in April 2018, its fleet consisted of the following aircraft:

Aircraft	In service	Orders	Passengers					Notes
Aircraft	In service	Orders	F	J	Y	Total	Refs	Notes
Bombardier CS100	8	2	—	variable		125		Launch customer
Bombardier CS300	9	11	—	variable		145		
Boeing 777-300ER	10	—	8	62	270	340		All were transferred back to Swiss International Air Lines.
Total	27	13						

=== Historical fleet ===
Historical fleet of Swiss Global Air Lines
Aircraft	Total	Year Introduced	Year Retired	Notes
Bombardier CS100	8	2016	2018	Transferred to Swiss International Air Lines.
Bombardier CS300	9	2016	2018	Transferred to Swiss International Air Lines.
Avro RJ85	4	2005	2007	Taken over from Crossair.
Avro RJ100	20	2005	2017	Taken over from Crossair.
Boeing 777-300ER	10	2016	2018	Transferred to Swiss International Air Lines.
Embraer ERJ-145	10	2005	2006	Taken over from Crossair.
