= Sky Alps =

Airline based in Bolzano, South Tyrol

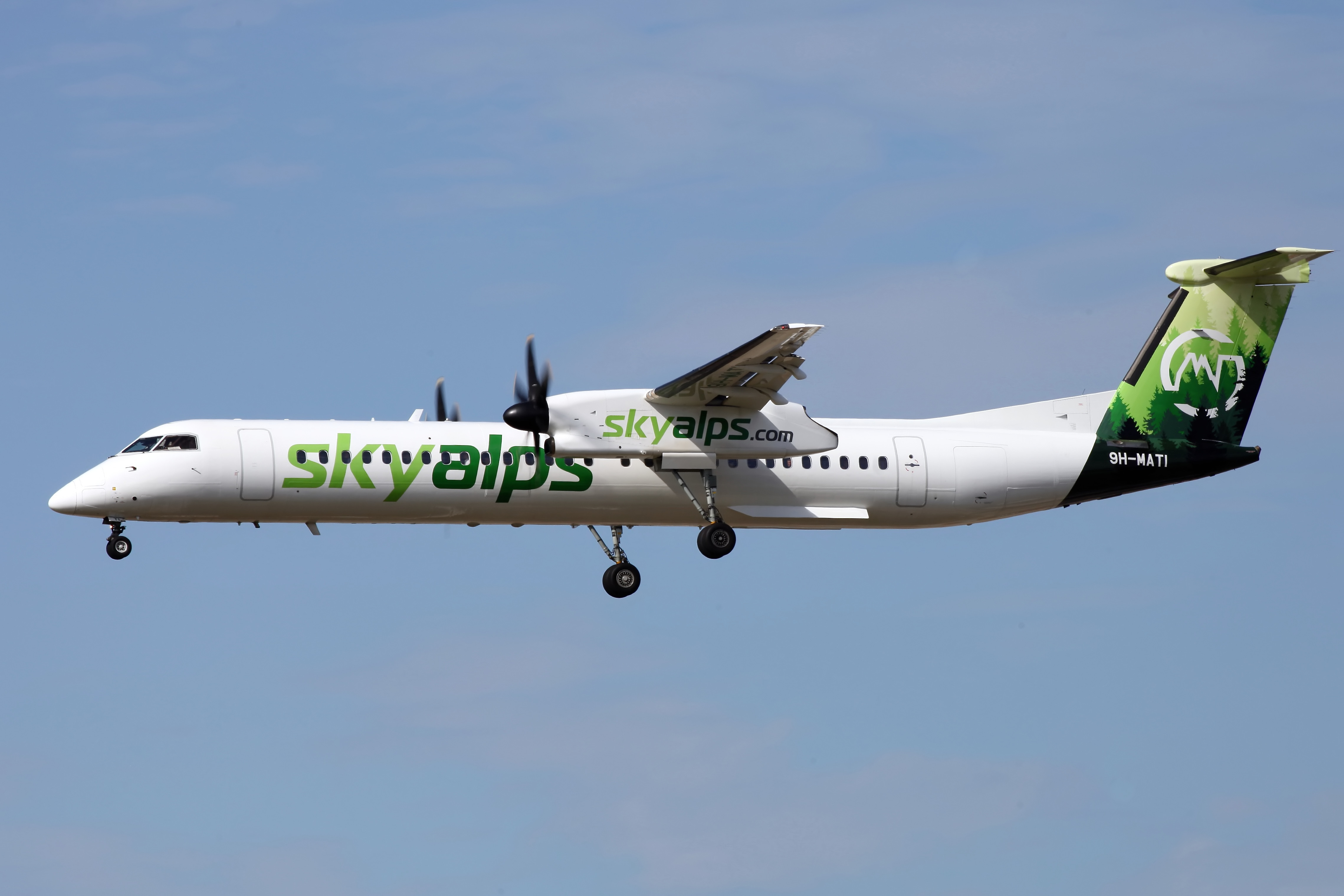
IATA	ICAO	Call sign
BQ	SWU	SKYALPS
- Founded: 2020; 6 years ago
- Hubs: Bolzano Airport
- Fleet size: 13
- Destinations: 26
- Headquarters: Bolzano, Italy
- Website: skyalps.com

Sky Alps S.r.l., branded as skyalps, is an Italian regional airline which operates flights at Bolzano Airport, in the autonomous province of South Tyrol, with an all De Havilland Canada Dash 8-400 fleet. The airline is a subsidiary of Fri-El Green Power, an Italian company focusing on renewable energy.

== History ==
The airline was founded by South Tyrolean entrepreneur Josef Gostner, who was part of ABD Holdings, a company that purchased Bolzano Airport from the South Tyrol government in 2019. The airline originally intended to commence operations in May 2020 with one daily flight between Bolzano and Rome, along with further connections to Vienna and Munich afterwards and charter flights to southern Italy during the summer season. Gostner also had plans to lengthen the runway at Bolzano Airport by 260 metres (850 ft) to allow larger aircraft to operate at the airport. However, it delayed the start of operations to June 2021 due to the impact of border closures associated with COVID-19.

The airline operated its first flights on 17 June 2021 to Olbia and Ibiza. It commenced twice-weekly flights between Bolzano and Berlin Brandenburg Airport on 30 June. It temporarily suspended operations in late 2021 while Bolzano Airport extended its runway from 1,293 to 1,462 metres (4,242 to 4,797 ft) to allow the handling of larger aircraft. It resumed operations on 15 December. The airline offered 13 weekly flights from Bolzano within its winter 2021 schedule.

As of December 2022, Sky Alps operated from Bolzano Airport to Berlin, Düsseldorf, Hamburg and several seasonal destinations. It primarily operates leisure flights with a focus on tourists travelling to ski resorts in South Tyrol. It is the first airline to operate scheduled services from Bolzano Airport after Darwin Airline suspended its flights between Bolzano and Rome's Fiumicino Airport in 2015, although Austrian Airlines has operated charter flights from Bolzano since then. Flights were then operated by Luxwing, a Maltese charter airline.

Sky Alps and the city of Mostar have also signed an agreement which will see the Italian regional carrier base one of its Dash 8-400 turboprop aircraft at Mostar Airport from April 2025 and launch several new routes.

== Destinations ==
As of November 2024, Sky Alps serves the following destinations:

Country	City	Airport	Notes	Refs
Austria	Linz	Linz Airport		
Belgium	Antwerp	Antwerp International Airport		
Belgium	Brussels	Brussels Airport	Terminated	
Bosnia and Herzegovina	Mostar	Mostar Airport		
Croatia	Brač	Brač Airport	Seasonal	
Croatia	Dubrovnik	Dubrovnik Airport	Seasonal	
Denmark	Billund	Billund Airport	Seasonal	
Denmark	Copenhagen	Copenhagen Airport	Seasonal	
Germany	Berlin	Berlin Brandenburg Airport		
Germany	Düsseldorf	Düsseldorf Airport		
Germany	Hamburg	Hamburg Airport		
Germany	Kassel	Kassel Airport	Seasonal	
Italy	Ancona	Marche Airport		
Italy	Aosta	Aosta Valley Airport	Terminated	
Italy	Bolzano	Bolzano Airport	Base	
Italy	Brindisi	Brindisi Airport	Seasonal	
Italy	Cagliari	Cagliari Elmas Airport	Seasonal	
Italy	Catania	Catania-Fontanarossa Airport	Seasonal	
Italy	Crotone	Crotone Airport		
Italy	Cuneo	Cuneo International Airport		
Italy	Lamezia Terme	Lamezia Terme International Airport	Seasonal	
Italy	Olbia	Olbia Costa Smeralda Airport	Seasonal	
Italy	Rome	Leonardo da Vinci–Fiumicino Airport		
Italy	Verona	Verona Villafranca Airport		
Netherlands	Groningen	Groningen Airport Eelde	Seasonal	
Netherlands	Rotterdam	Rotterdam The Hague Airport	Terminated	
Spain	Ibiza	Ibiza Airport	Seasonal	
Spain	Palma de Mallorca	Palma de Mallorca Airport	Terminated	
Sweden	Gothenburg	Göteborg Landvetter Airport	Seasonal	
Switzerland	Bern	Bern Airport	Seasonal charter	
Switzerland	Zürich	Zürich Airport	Terminated	
United Kingdom	London	Gatwick Airport		
United Kingdom	London	London Stansted Airport	Terminated	

== Fleet ==
=== Current fleet ===
As of July 2026, Sky Alps operates the following aircraft:

Sky Alps fleet
Aircraft	In service	Orders	Passengers	Notes
De Havilland Canada DHC-8-400	13	—	76	
De Havilland Canada DHC-8-400	13	—	78	
Total	13	—		

=== Former fleet ===
As of May 2026, Sky Alps operated 13 De Havilland Canada DHC-8-400.

Over the years, Sky Alps has operated the following aircraft types:

Sky Alps former fleet
Aircraft	Number	Introduced	Retired	Notes
De Havilland DHC-8-400	1	2024	2025	
