= SkyWork Airlines =

Swiss airline

IATA	ICAO	Call sign
SX	SRK	SKYFOX
- Founded: 1983
- Ceased operations: 29 August 2018
- AOC #: CH.AOC.1039
- Hubs: Bern Airport
- Focus cities: EuroAirport Basel Mulhouse Freiburg
- Fleet size: 6
- Destinations: 20
- Headquarters: Belp, Switzerland
- Key people: Martin Inäbnit, CEO
- Employees: 180

SkyWork Airlines was a Swiss airline with its head office in Belp (BE) near Bern and its base at Bern Airport. It primarily operated scheduled flights to destinations across Europe, with additional charter operations throughout the summer months. The airline declared bankruptcy on 29 August 2018 and ceased all operations the same day.

== History ==
=== Development ===
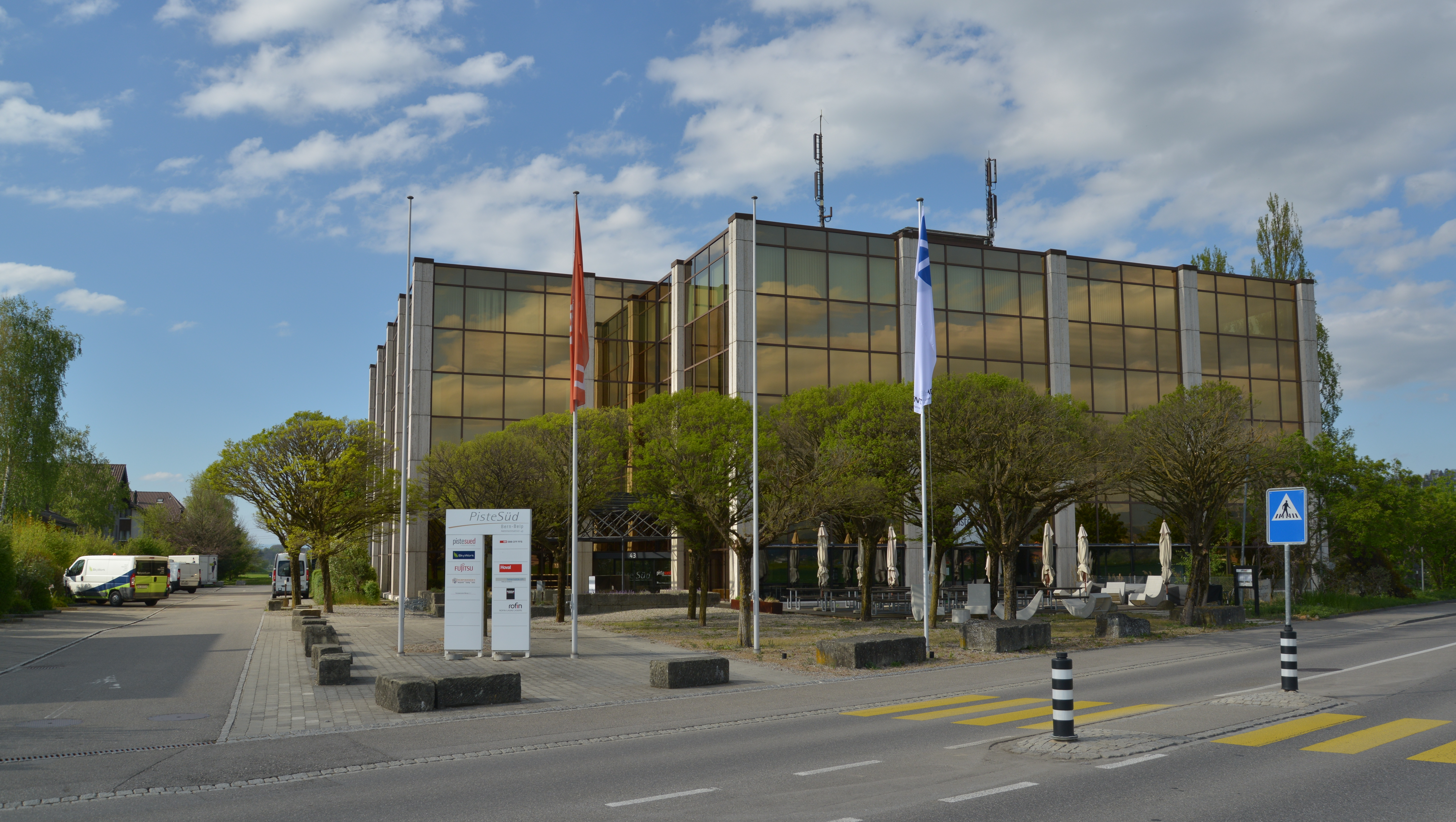
Head office of SkyWork Airlines

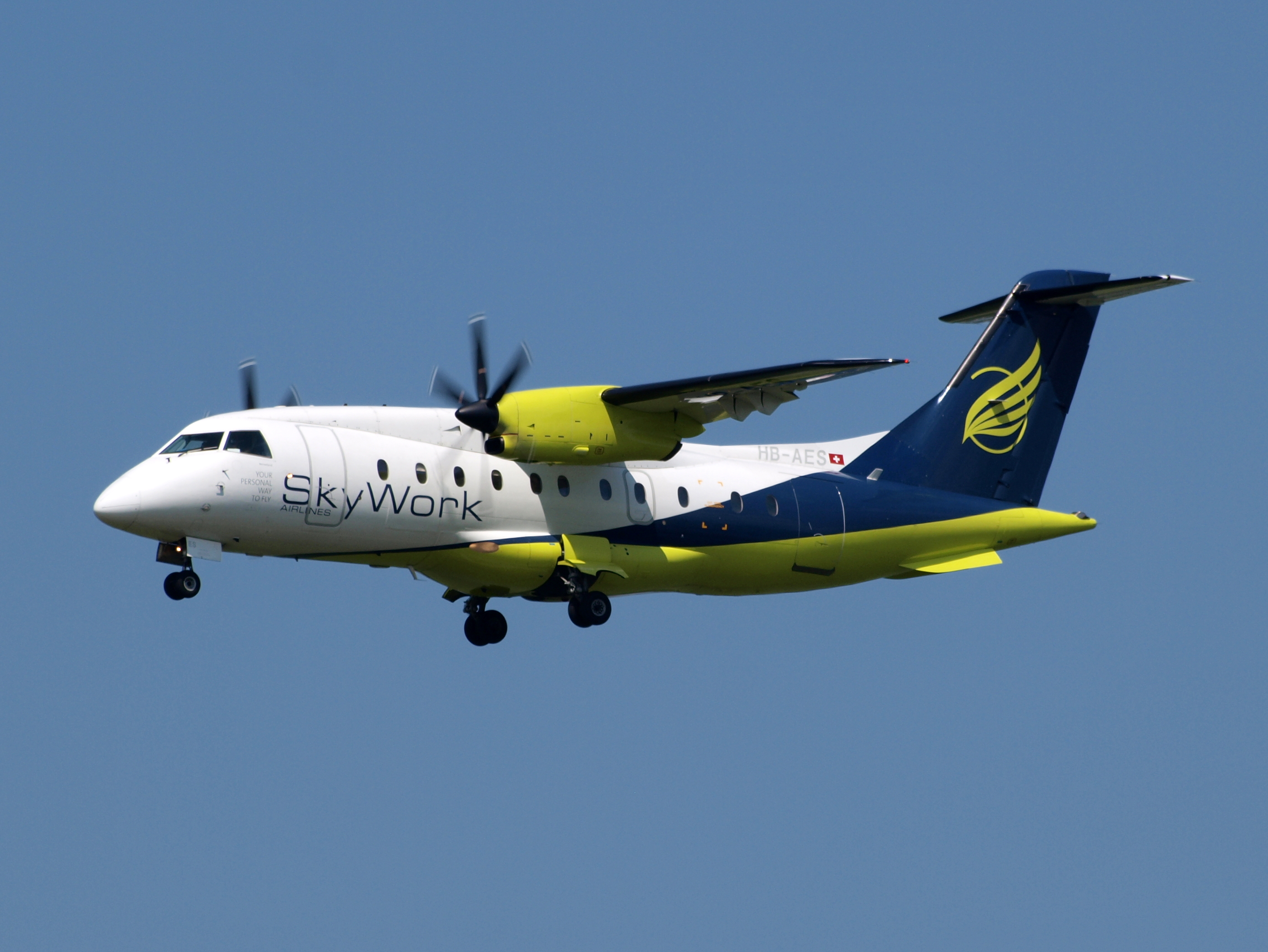
Former SkyWork Dornier 328-110 which was retired in August 2018

The airline's head office was originally in the north terminal of Bern Airport in Belp.

The last of three Bombardier Dash 8 Q400 were transferred to Air Berlin by October 2014. Also in October 2014, London-Southend replaced London-City as SkyWork's destination for London. By April 2015 SkyWork had announced a decrease in their London operations from 12 return flights per week to 9 per week. From July 2015 SkyWork served London-City Airport via a stopover at EuroAirport Basel Mulhouse Freiburg. In 2016 the airline introduced flights from Bern to Usedom via Basel as well.

In November 2015, SkyWork announced the termination of their ACMI contract with Darwin Airline by December 2015. Scheduled flights to London-Southend were terminated due to capacity restrictions. At the same time, SkyWork announced the retirement of their fleet of Dornier 328-110s by autumn 2017 as these were gradually replaced with Saab 2000s. In October 2016, SkyWork entered an interline agreement with Air France-KLM, integrating Bern into that group's global network through Amsterdam.

In October 2017, SkyWork called off plans for extensive scheduled operations from Sion Airport to several European cities, catering for skiing tourism, due to low demand. At the same time, the airline also cancelled its service from Basel to London City Airport.

=== Demise ===
On 16 October 2017, the Swiss Federal Office of Civil Aviation (BAZL) announced it would terminate SkyWork's air operator's certificate after October if the airline failed to provide sufficient funds to operate the upcoming winter schedule. As the licence renewal did not take place until the end of the summer schedule, SkyWork Airlines was forced to cancel all flights for the first day of the winter schedule on 29 October 2017. On the same day, SkyWork had to extend the cancellation until 31 October. They also announced they had not yet found an investor to support the company and would continue the search. It was stated that base operations out of Bern Airport alone were not financially viable. Competitor Adria Airways announced that it would take over some metropolitan routes in the event of the airline's demise.

On the evening of 29 August 2018, SkyWork Airlines filed for bankruptcy after failed negotiations with a new investor. The airline ceased all operations and handed back its operating license to the authorities.

== Destinations ==
SkyWork Airlines operated scheduled flights to Western European cities along with partially seasonal leisure destinations in Southern Europe from its home base in Bern, as well as a smaller summer seasonal focus city operation in Basel.

== Fleet ==
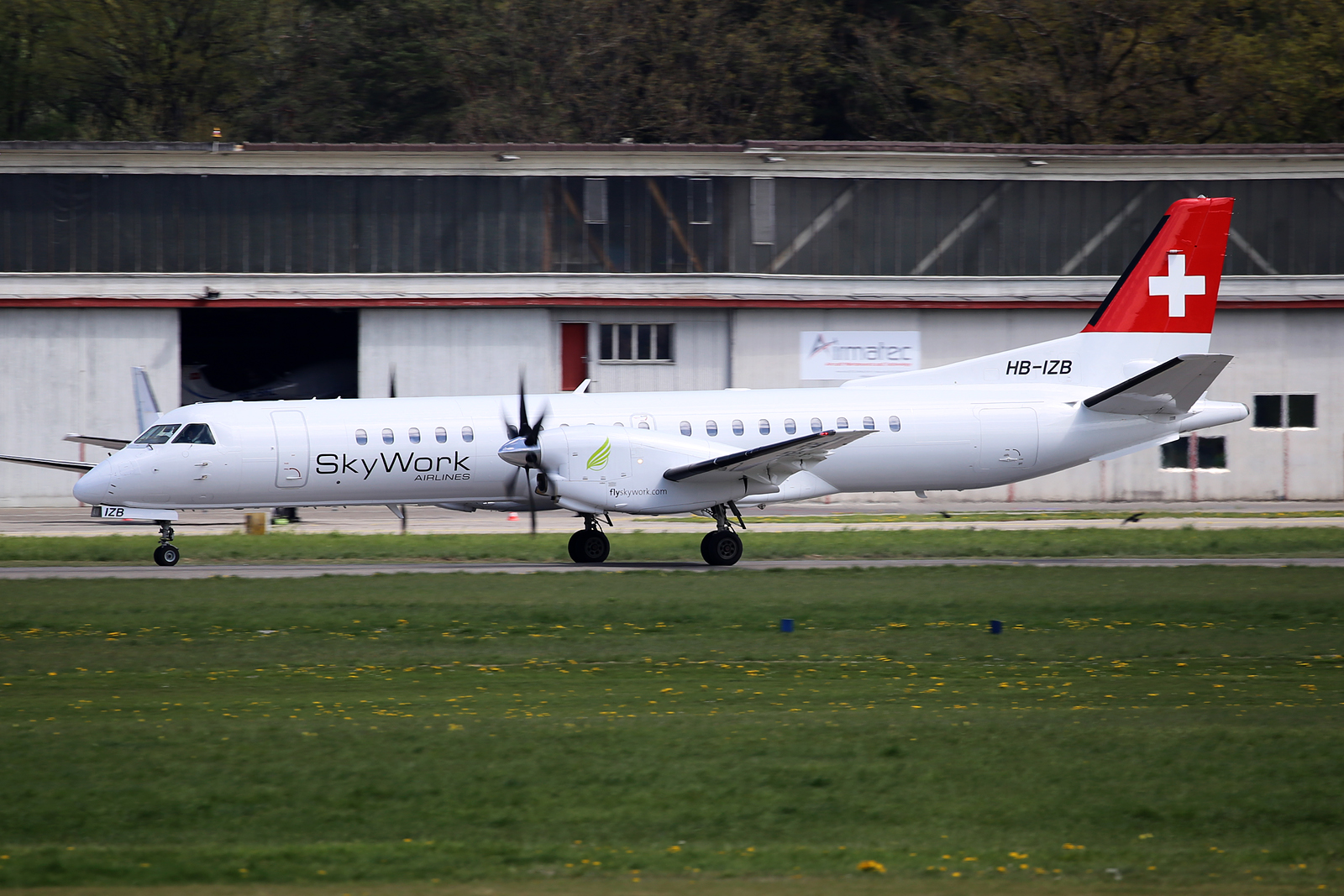
SkyWork Saab 2000

As of August 2018, the SkyWork Airlines fleet comprised the following aircraft:

SkyWork Airlines fleet
Aircraft	In service	Orders	Passengers	Notes
Embraer 170	—	1	80	was to be acquired during 2018
Saab 2000	6	—	50	
Total	6	1		

The airline previously also operated a fleet of Dornier 328-110s which were gradually replaced by larger Saab 2000s by early 2018.
