= List of the busiest airports in Switzerland =

Switzerland's seven busiest airports by passenger traffic are Zurich Airport, Geneva Airport, Basel Airport, Bern Airport, St. Gallen Airport, Lugano Airport and Sion Airport. Only Zurich, Geneva and Basel exceed one million passengers per annum.

The following lists give passenger numbers, with an indication of the annual change in numbers, for the years from 2010 to 2019.

== 2019 ==
Switzerland's 7 busiest airports by passenger traffic in 2019
Rank	Airport	Location	Total passengers	Annual change	Rank change
1	Zurich Airport	Zürich	31,478,748	▲	Steady
2	Geneva Airport	Geneva	17,826,513	▲	Steady
3	Basel Airport	Basel	9,068,206	▲	Steady
4	St. Gallen Airport	St. Gallen	107,637	▼	▲1
5	Lugano Airport	Lugano	56,201	▼	▲1
6	Bern Airport	Bern	22,233	▼	▼2
7	Sion Airport	Sion	2,381	▼	Steady

== 2018 ==
Switzerland's 7 busiest airports by passenger traffic in 2018
Rank	Airport	Location	Total passengers	Annual change	Rank change
1	Zurich Airport	Zürich	31,069,873	▲	Steady
2	Geneva Airport	Geneva	17,577,577	▲	Steady
3	Basel Airport	Basel	8,559,352	▲	Steady
4	Bern Airport	Bern	137,042	▼	Steady
5	St. Gallen Airport	St. Gallen	113,599	▲	▲1
6	Lugano Airport	Lugano	88,570	▼	▼1
7	Sion Airport	Sion	8,782	▼	Steady

== 2017 ==
Switzerland's 7 busiest airports by passenger traffic in 2017
Rank	Airport	Location	Total passengers	Annual change	Rank change
1	Zurich Airport	Zürich	29,361,201	▲	Steady
2	Geneva Airport	Geneva	17,259,942	▲	Steady
3	Basel Airport	Basel	7,868,537	▲	Steady
4	Bern Airport	Bern	167,566	▲	▲1
5	Lugano Airport	Lugano	135,534	▼	▼1
6	St. Gallen Airport	St. Gallen	109,776	▲	Steady
7	Sion Airport	Sion	9,349	▲	Steady

== 2016 ==
Switzerland's 7 busiest airports by passenger traffic in 2016
Rank	Airport	Location	Total passengers	Annual change	Rank change
1	Zurich Airport	Zürich	27,630,699	▲	Steady
2	Geneva Airport	Geneva	16,444,335	▲	Steady
3	Basel Airport	Basel	7,287,084	▲	Steady
4	Lugano Airport	Lugano	167,686	▲	▲1
5	Bern Airport	Bern	167,292	▼	▼1
6	St. Gallen Airport	St. Gallen	98,979	▲	Steady
7	Sion Airport	Sion	4,455	▼	Steady

== 2015 ==
Switzerland's 7 busiest airports by passenger traffic in 2015
Rank	Airport	Location	Total passengers	Annual change	Rank change
1	Zurich Airport	Zürich	26,251,507	▲	Steady
2	Geneva Airport	Geneva	15,682,128	▲	Steady
3	Basel Airport	Basel	7,028,970	▲	Steady
4	Bern Airport	Bern	175,024	▼	Steady
5	Lugano Airport	Lugano	156,435	▲	Steady
6	St. Gallen Airport	St. Gallen	91,976	▲	Steady
7	Sion Airport	Sion	6,660	▲	Steady

== 2014 ==
Switzerland's 7 busiest airports by passenger traffic in 2014
Rank	Airport	Location	Total passengers	Annual change	Rank change
1	Zurich Airport	Zürich	25,451,017	▲2.4%	Steady
2	Geneva Airport	Geneva	15,057,335	▲5.1%	Steady
3	Basel Airport	Basel	6,498,654	▲11.2%	Steady
4	Bern Airport	Bern	177,539	▼27.5%	Steady
5	Lugano Airport	Lugano	135,530	▼5.0%	Steady
6	St. Gallen Airport	St. Gallen	84,098	▼2.2%	Steady
7	Sion Airport	Sion	2,258	▼12.9%	Steady

== 2013 ==
Switzerland's 7 busiest airports by passenger traffic in 2013
Rank	Airport	Location	Total passengers	Annual change	Rank change
1	Zurich Airport	Zürich	24,853,679	▲0.3%	Steady
2	Geneva Airport	Geneva	14,328,107	▲3.9%	Steady
3	Basel Airport	Basel	5,843,927	▲9.8%	Steady
4	Bern Airport	Bern	244,699	▼5.4%	Steady
5	Lugano Airport	Lugano	142,570	▼14.8%	Steady
6	St. Gallen Airport	St. Gallen	85,960	▼25.7%	Steady
7	Sion Airport	Sion	2,591	▼54.4%	Steady

== 2012 ==
Switzerland's 7 busiest airports by passenger traffic in 2012
Rank	Airport	Location	Total passengers	Annual change	Rank change
1	Zurich Airport	Zürich	24,789,083	▲2.0%	Steady
2	Geneva Airport	Geneva	13,785,309	▲6.0%	Steady
3	Basel Airport	Basel	5,322,516	▲6.0%	Steady
4	Bern Airport	Bern	258,543	▲52.7%	Steady
5	Lugano Airport	Lugano	167,371	▲1.4%	Steady
6	St. Gallen Airport	St. Gallen	115,710	▲22.0%	Steady
7	Sion Airport	Sion	5,678	▼10.1%	Steady

== 2011 ==
Switzerland's 7 busiest airports by passenger traffic in 2011
Rank	Airport	Location	Total passengers	Annual change	Rank change
1	Zurich Airport	Zürich	24,313,250	▲6.4%	Steady
2	Geneva Airport	Geneva	13,003,611	▲10.7%	Steady
3	Basel Airport	Basel	5,020,987	▲22.8%	Steady
4	Bern Airport	Bern	169,288	▲96.9%	▲1
5	Lugano Airport	Lugano	165,054	▲3.5%	▼1
6	St. Gallen Airport	St. Gallen	94,834	▲38.7%	Steady
7	Sion Airport	Sion	6,315	▲61.4%	Steady

== 2010 ==
Switzerland's 7 busiest airports by passenger traffic in 2010
Rank	Airport	Location	Total passengers	Annual change	Rank change
1	Zurich Airport	Zürich	22,854,358	▲4.3%	Steady
2	Geneva Airport	Geneva	11,748,972	▲5.1%	Steady
3	Basel Airport	Basel	4,087,931	▲7.0%	Steady
4	Lugano Airport	Lugano	159,497	▲1.5%	Steady
5	Bern Airport	Bern	85,981	▼9.6%	Steady
6	St. Gallen Airport	St. Gallen	68,395	▼6.7%	Steady
7	Sion Airport	Sion	3,912	▲192.2%	Steady
