= Bolzano Airport =

Bolzano Airport Aeroporto di Bolzano
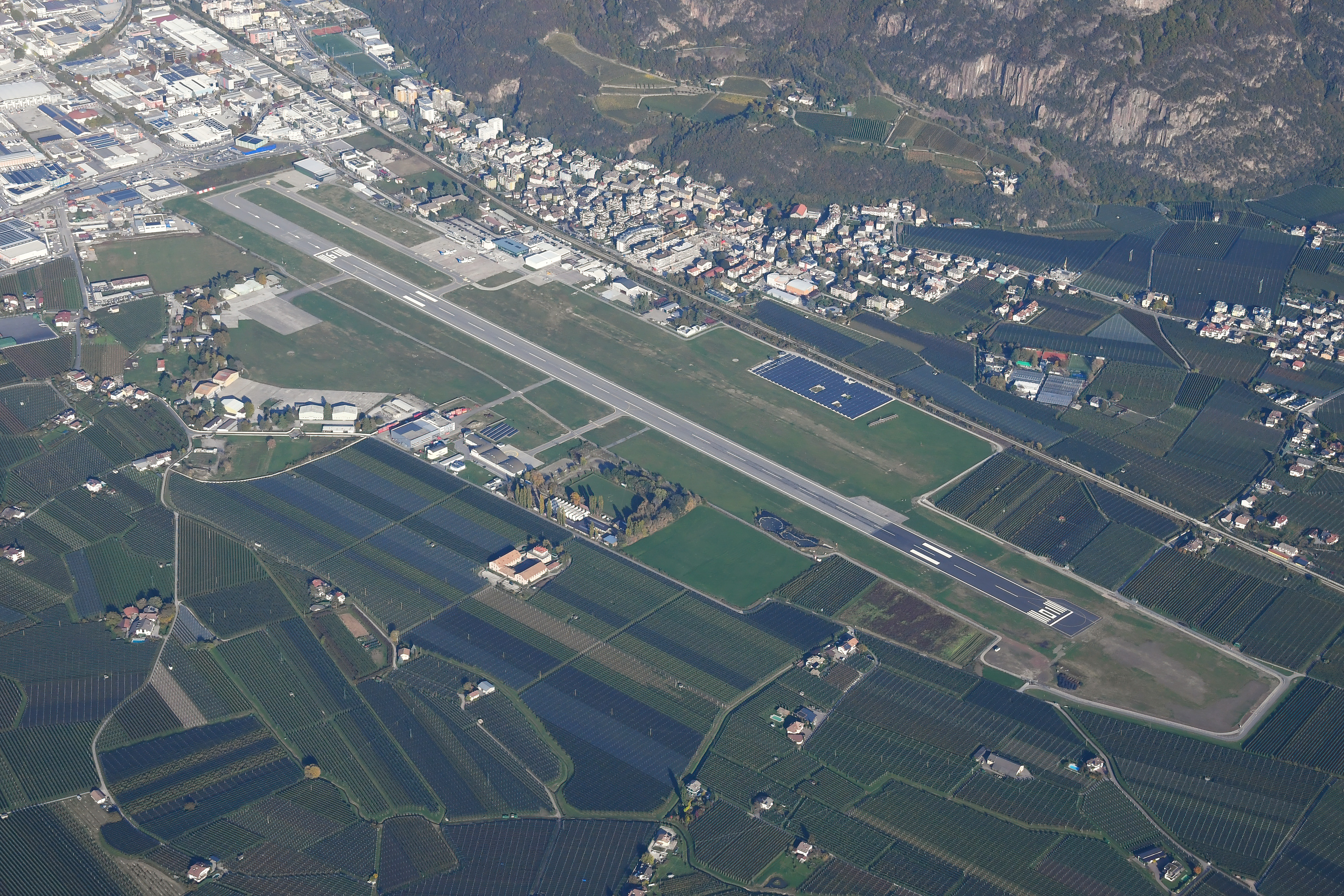
- IATA: BZO; ICAO: LIPB

Summary
- Airport type: Public
- Operator: ABD Airport AG/S.p.A.
- Serves: Bolzano, Italy
- Operating base for: Sky Alps
- Elevation AMSL: 270 m (890 ft)
- Coordinates: 46°27′37″N 011°19′35″E
- Website: bolzanoairport.it

Map
- Location within South Tyrol Location within Italy

Runways
| Direction | Length | | Surface |
| Direction | m | ft | Surface |
|---|---|---|---|
| 01/19 | 1,462 | 4,797 | Asphalt |

Statistics (2025)
- Passengers: 132,969
- Passenger change 24-25: ▲25,3%
- Aircraft movements: 16,662
- Movements change 24-25: ▲12%
- Statistics from the Italian Civil Aviation Authority

Bolzano Airport (Italian: Aeroporto di Bolzano — Dolomiti, German: Flughafen Bozen — Dolomiten) (IATA: BZO, ICAO: LIPB) is a international airport near Bolzano in the province of South Tyrol in northern Italy and serves as the home base for Sky Alps.

== History ==
The airport was established in October 1926 with a 1,300-metre (4,300 ft) landing runway.

Darwin Airline ceased their PSO-flights to Rome on behalf of Alitalia on 18 June 2015 leaving Bolzano Airport again without any scheduled commercial traffic. In June 2016, a public opinion poll decided to no longer support the highly deficient airport with money from the government. Therefore, it was decided that the airport's operator company would be liquidated and the licence given back to the Italian authorities, which means the airport would be shut down entirely if no other operator were found. South Tyrol spent over €120 million in recent years for the airport without attracting any lasting scheduled traffic.

In 2019, the South Tyrol government sold the airport to ABD Holding, a private company of entrepreneurs Josef Gostner, René Benko and Hans Peter Haselsteiner, for a price of 3.8 million euros. The airport extended its runway to 1,462 m (4,797 ft) in late 2021.

== Airline and destinations ==
The following airlines operate regular scheduled and charter flights at Bolzano Airport:

| Airlines | Destinations |
|---|---|
| Sky Alps | Antwerp, Berlin, Düsseldorf, Hamburg; Seasonal: Billund, Brindisi, Cagliari, Catania, Copenhagen, Corfu, Dresden, Gothenburg, Groningen (begins 26 April 2027), Hannover, Ibiza, Kassel, Kefalonia, Lamezia Terme, London–Gatwick, Menorca, Olbia, Palermo (begins 15 May 2027), Preveza/Lefkada, Prague (begins 9 December 2026), Thessaloniki, Warsaw–Chopin |

== Accidents and incidents ==
- In March 2021, a helicopter owned by the Guardia di Finanza, crash landed at the airport. The helicopter was quite new.

== See also ==
- List of airports in Italy
