= Hugo Wolf F/A-18C simulator =

Aircraft simulator

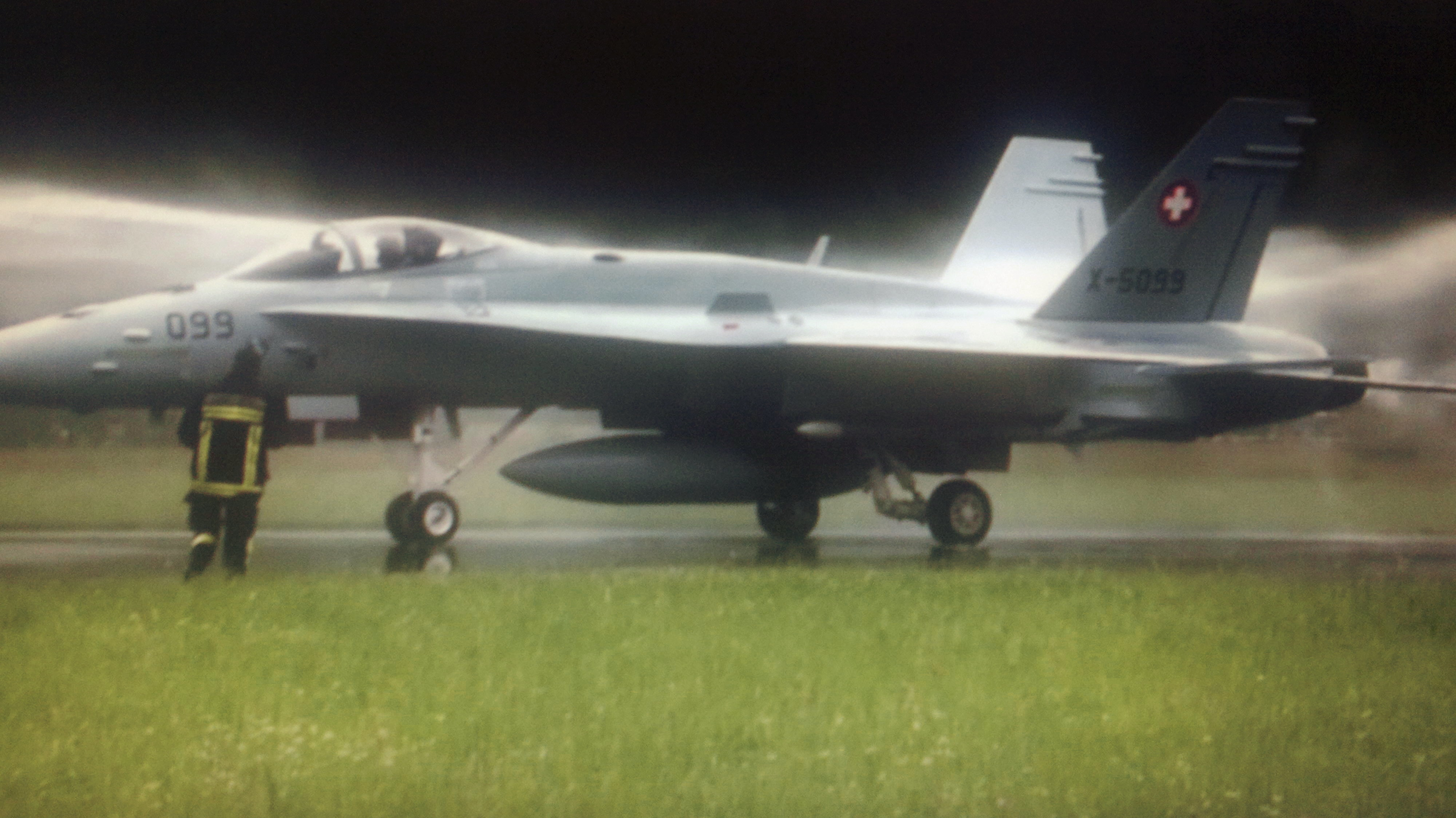
F/A-18C Mock-up with official aircraft registration X-5099 at Meiringen AFB

The Hugo Wolf F/A-18C simulator (official designation: Mobile Training Installation Ground Operations) is a realistic non-flying replica of a McDonnell Douglas F/A-18 Hornet, used as an interactive training simulator for operational ground staff. It is fitted with specialised equipment to simulate various emergency scenarios. Two examples are used by the Swiss Air Force.

== History ==
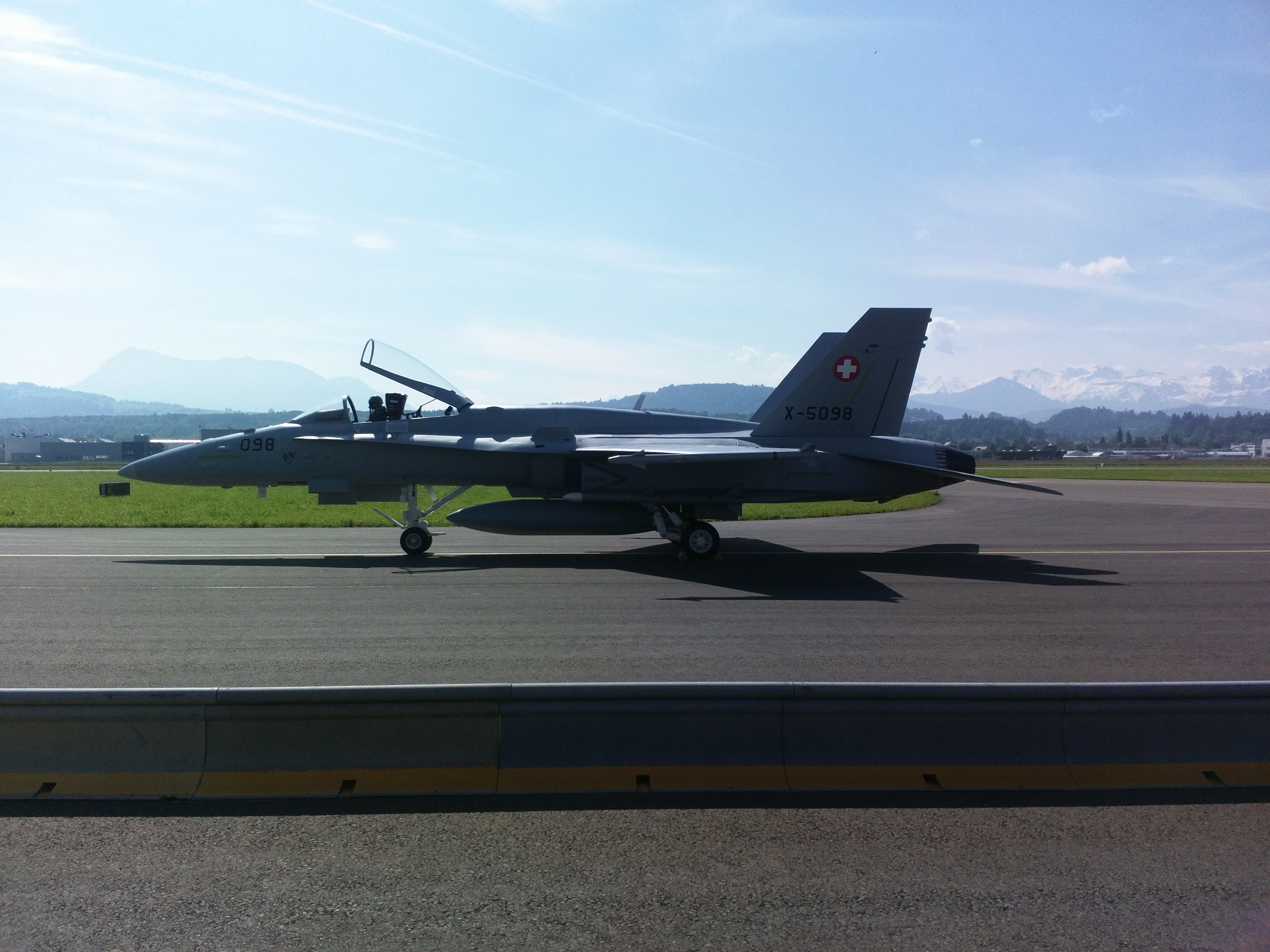
X-5098 at Emmen AFB

The Swiss Air Force operates a number of McDonnell Douglas F/A-18C Hornet aircraft. Training of ground crew in emergency procedures initially required diversion of an aircraft from operational duties. Swiss fibreglass cabin construction specialists Hugo Wolf AG began design studies for a training simulator in 2009 and it evolved into a proposal for a Mobile Training Installation Ground Operations, in the form of a realistic and interactive non-flying mock-up. This was seen as a cost-effective alternative to diverting operational aircraft.

The first example was delivered in 2013. Formally designated a Boeing F/A-18C Hornet (Hugo Wolf), it is registered as aircraft serial number X-5099. The simulator is transportable and is periodically moved by road between the various airfields used by the Swiss Air Force, including Militärflugplatz Emmen, Meiringen Air Base, Sion Airport and Zürich Airport.

The first mock-up proved effective and high demand led to the ordering of a second unit, incorporating various improvements, in 2016. Designated X-5098, it was delivered in 2017. This more capable simulator is also more difficult to transport and so it is permanently located at Payerne Air Base.

== Design and construction ==
The mock-up is an accurate representation of the McDonnell Douglas F/A-18C Hornets used by the Swiss Air Force and is based on data supplied by the aircraft manufacturer. With an overall length of 17 m (56 ft), span of 12 m (39 ft) and weighing about two-thirds as much as the real aircraft, the primary structure is of wood, metal and GRP composite materials.

Interactive features include an opening cockpit canopy and folding wings, with much of the cockpit instrumentation being original equipment supplied from the US. The wing hard points are functional, allowing the attachment of external stores which are also integrated into the system.

The simulator is fitted with additional specialised equipment for recreating many rescue scenarios. Supporting equipment includes an onboard power supply and control computer.

== Training features ==
An instructor can set the rig to simulate engine fires, overheated and glowing landing gear and smoke in the cockpit. The simulator can reproduce realistic engine noise and fuel leaks (using water) from both internal and external tankage, Dummy AIM-120 AMRAAM and AIM-9 Sidewinder weapons and external fuel tanks may be fitted to any of the external hard points. The cockpit is partly furnished with original American instruments and fittings, including the ejection seat, for use in conjunction with the powered canopy.

Training scenarios designed for include routine aircraft ground handling, pilot rescue, aircraft fires, fuel leaks, runway excursions, engine shutdown and deactivation of live ordnance, either individually or in combination.

The second example, X-5098, has additional capabilities, including a retractable nose undercarriage to simulate collapse. Both preset and user-defined scenarios can be controlled via a remote tablet.
