= Baboo (airline) =

Regional airline of Switzerland (2003–2010)

IATA	ICAO	Call sign
F7	BBO	BABOO
- Founded: 2003
- Ceased operations: 2010
- Hubs: Geneva Airport
- Frequent-flyer program: Flying Blue
- Parent company: Darwin Airline
- Headquarters: Grand-Saconnex, Switzerland

Fly Baboo SA, marketed as Baboo, was a regional airline based on the grounds of Geneva Airport and in Grand-Saconnex, Switzerland. In November 2010, the company was saved from bankruptcy and acquired by the Darwin Airline Group from Lugano.

== History ==
Baboo was founded by Julian Cook in August 2003 following SWISS' decision to abandon the Geneva-Lugano route. The first flight to Lugano took place on November 3, 2003 with a Cirrus Airlines aircraft. In May 2004 the airline obtained its Air Operator's Certificate licence from the Federal Office for Civil Aviation of Switzerland (FOCA), allowing it to operate with its own aircraft - a 50-seat Dash 8-Q300 leased from the manufacturer, Bombardier Aerospace.

Baboo was then able to acquire its own aircraft, two Dash 8-Q400 turboprops that formed the airline's fleet for the next five years. In 2007, Baboo was running out of capital and was sold to Lebanese Investment Group M1; among the major developments an equity increase amounting to 9.2 million Euros, which was subscribed in 2007, enabled the management to devise a sound growth strategy and to give the company a new dimension and corporate image. Julian Cook was then ousted from the company.

The company also ordered three Embraer E190 regional jets, which were to be delivered from April 2008. The airline announced routes to Kyiv and St-Petersburg. By September 2008, the three aircraft had been delivered and Baboo announced new routes to Toulouse, Bordeaux, Athens, Bucharest and Zagreb from Geneva. However, the airline encountered problems with its two previously-announced routes: its flights to St-Petersburg were blocked by Russian authorities, whereas its flights to Kyiv did not prove popular enough; as a result, neither route ever operated.

At the end of 2009 Baboo posted a turnover of 73 million Swiss francs. More than 1,300,000 passengers had been carried by that date. Baboo had codeshare agreements with TAROM, Air France-CityJet, Alitalia and Olympic Air. The airline introduced flights to Milan, Marseille, London and a seasonal ski route to Oxford from Geneva in December 2009, but by June 2010 flights to Naples, Milan and Marseille had been stopped, and the Oxford service had been dropped from the airline's winter timetable.

In October 2010, Baboo announced it planned to return its three Embraer E190 aircraft to their lessors by the end of November 2010. On 25 November 2010, Darwin Airline announced its plans to take over Baboo by early 2011. Under the plan, Darwin acquired some assets of Baboo.

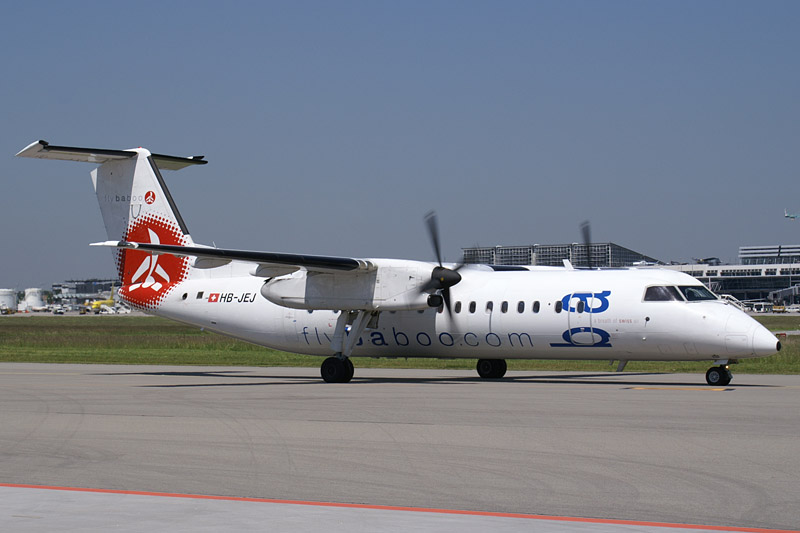
Baboo Bombardier Dash 8 Q300 (2006)

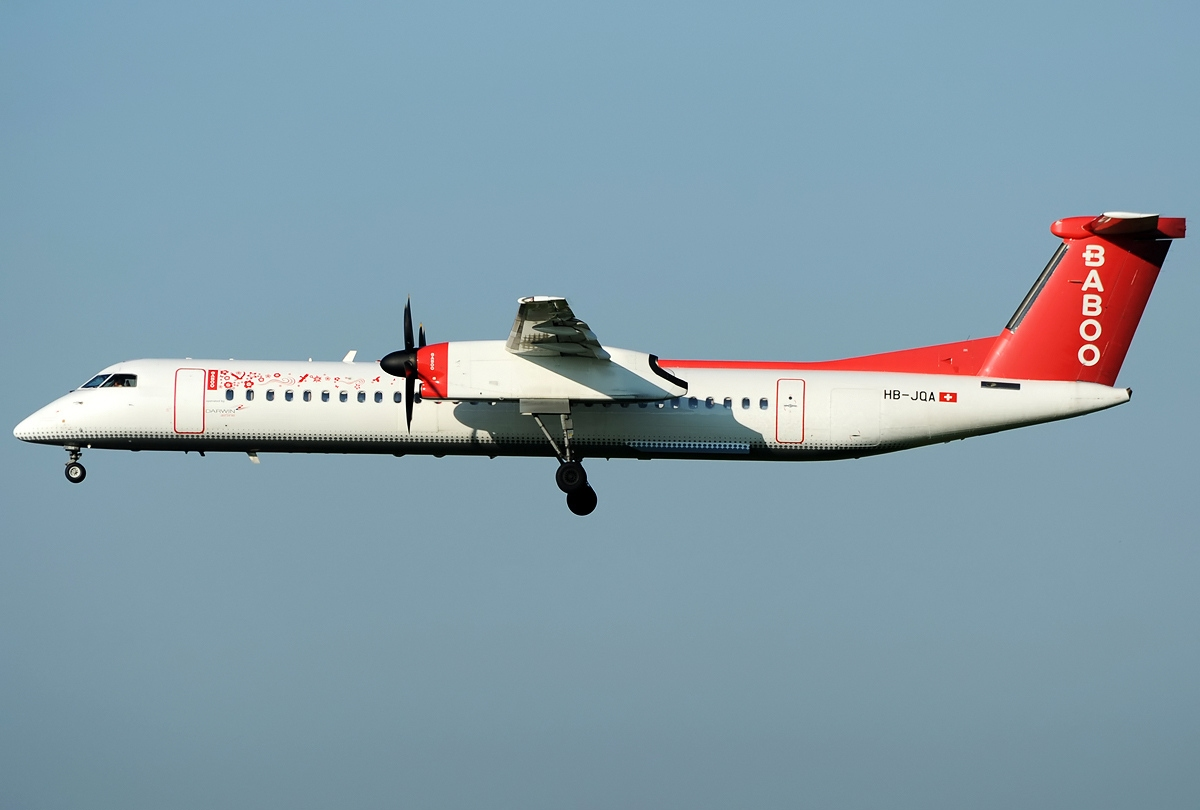
Baboo Bombardier Dash 8 Q400

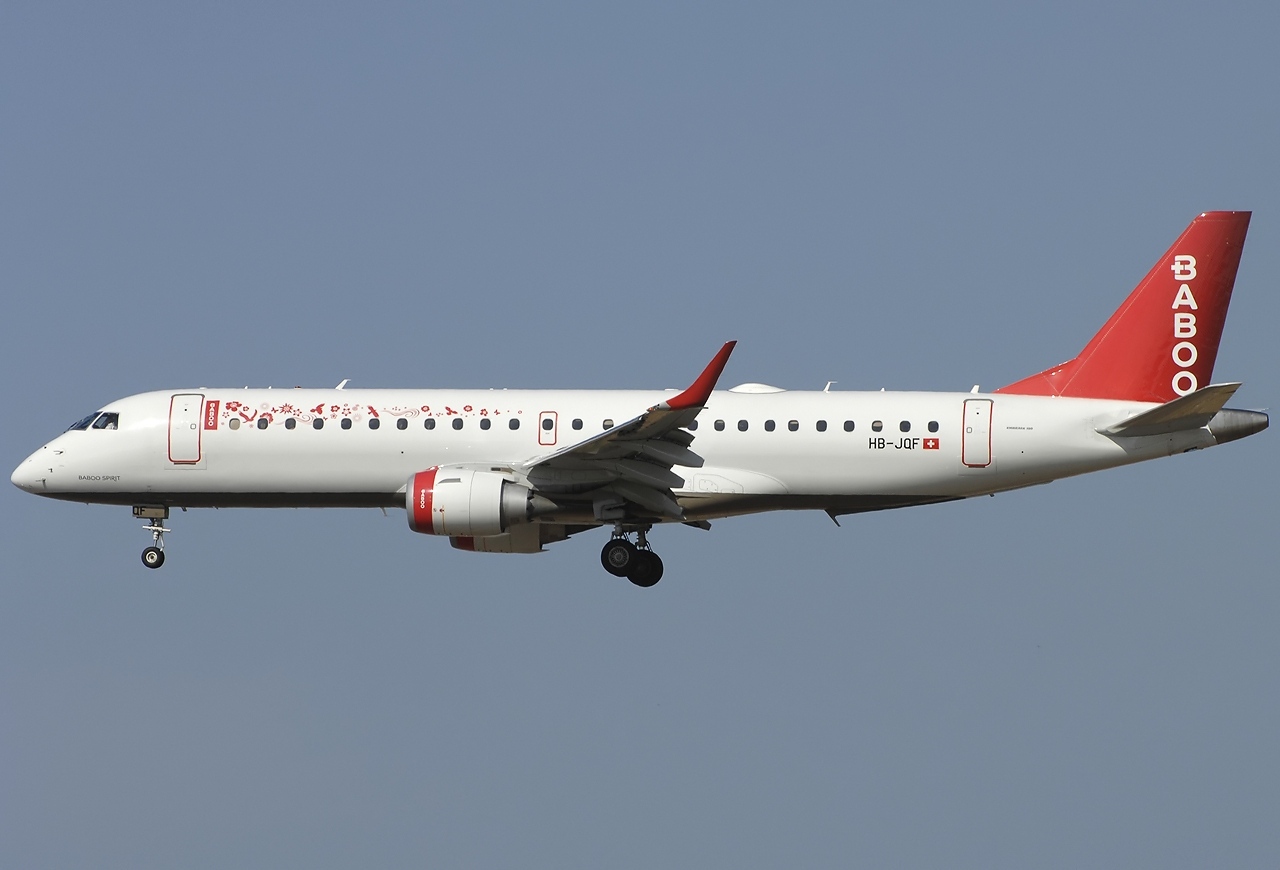
Baboo Embraer 190

== Codeshare agreements ==
Baboo had codeshare agreements with the following airlines:

- Air France
- Alitalia
- Olympic Air
- TAROM

== Fleet ==
=== Last fleet ===
At the time of the takeover announcement, the Baboo fleet consisted of the following aircraft:

Aircraft	Total	Passengers
Bombardier Dash 8 Q400	2	74
Total	2	

=== Historic fleet ===
The Baboo fleet previously consisted of the following aircraft:

Aircraft	Total	Retired
Bombardier Dash 8 Q300	3	2008
Embraer ERJ135	1	2004
Embraer 190	3	2010
Total	7	
