= Bern Airport =

Airport in Bern

Regional Aerodrome Bern-Belp
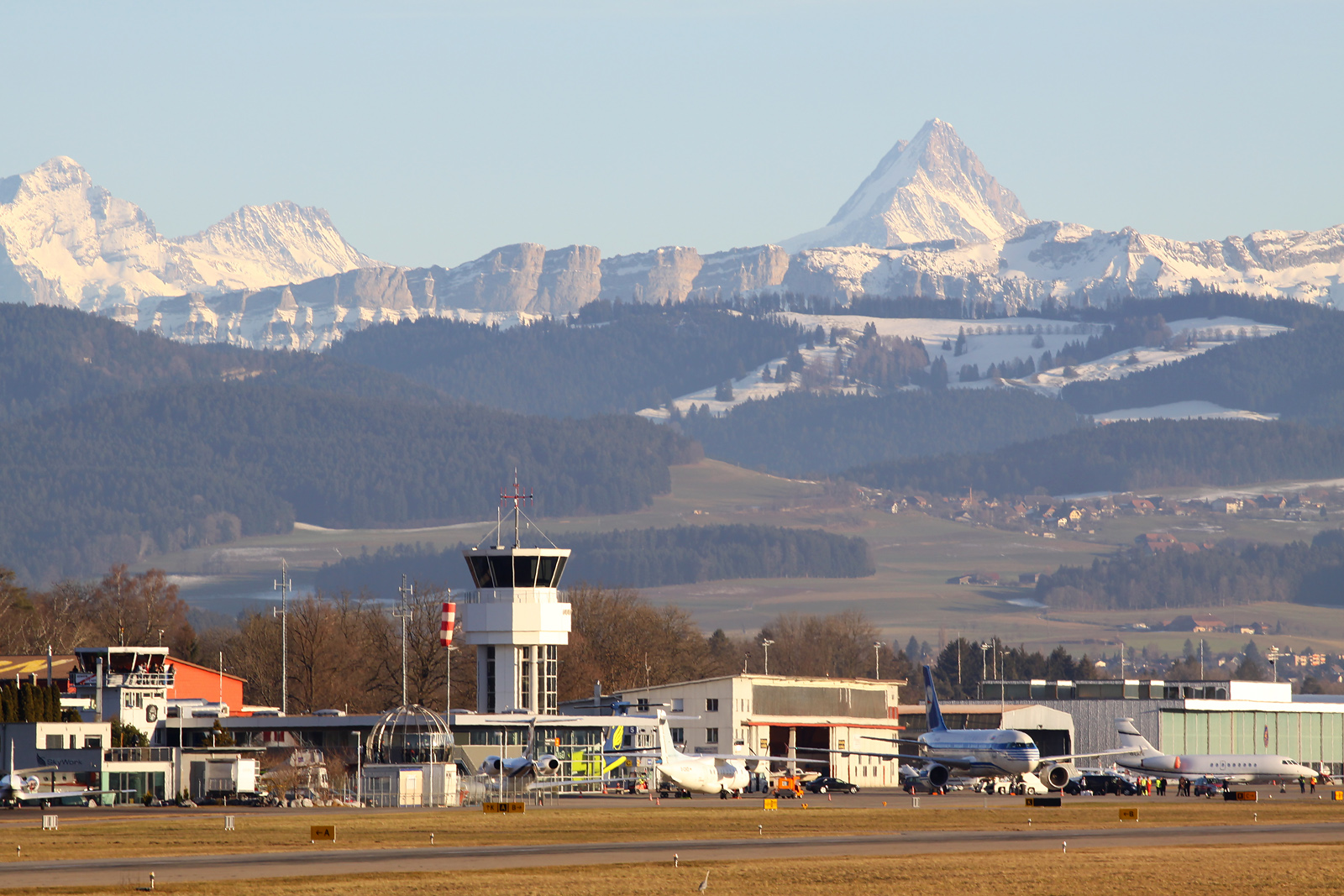
- IATA: BRN; ICAO: LSZB / LSMB

Summary
- Airport type: Public Regional Aerodrome
- Operator: Flughafen Bern AG
- Serves: Bern; Fribourg
- Location: Belp
- Elevation AMSL: 1,673 ft / 510 m
- Coordinates: 46°54′44″N 07°29′57″E
- Website: www.bernairport.ch

Map
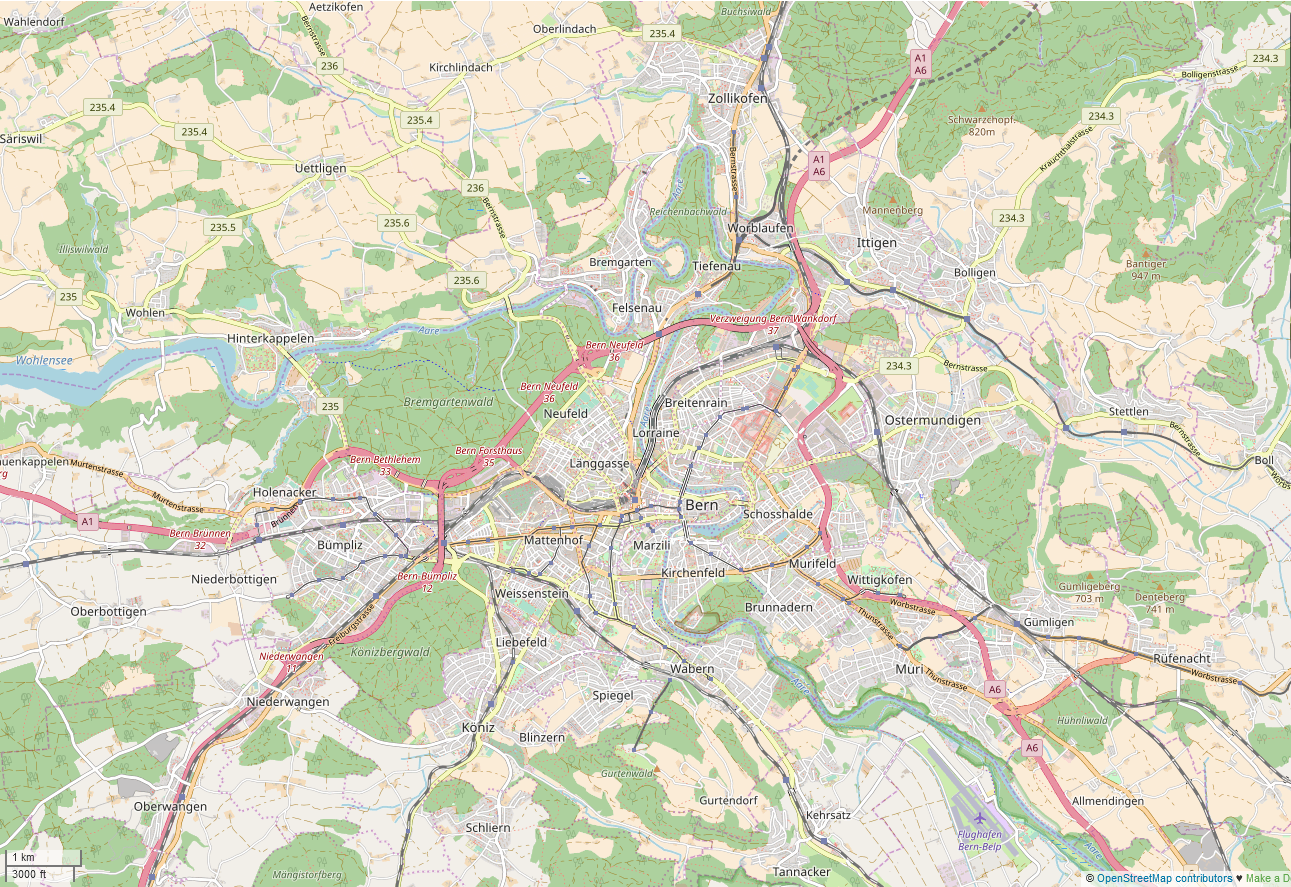
- Location of the airport in Switzerland BRN/LSZB (Bern)

Runways
Direction	Length		Surface
Direction	m	ft	Surface
14/32	1,730	5,676	Asphalt
14L/32R	650	2,133	Grass

Statistics (2021)
- Passengers: 6,022
- Aircraft movements: 44,651
- Source: Swiss AIP at EUROCONTROL

Bern-Belp Regional Aerodrome (IATA: BRN, ICAO: LSZB / LSMB), marketed as Bern Airport, (Note: German: Flughafen Bern, French: Aéroport de Berne, Italian: Aeroporto di Berna, Romansh: Eroport da Berna) officially referred to as Regionalflugplatz Bern-Belp in German, is a regional aerodrome serving Bern, the capital of Switzerland. The aerodrome is located within the town limits of Belp, and used to feature scheduled flights to some European metropolitan and several leisure destinations. It handled 183,319 passengers in 2016, a decrease of 3.5 percent over 2015.

It was the home base of now defunct SkyWork Airlines whose grounding caused the aerodrome to lose more than 1/3 of its turnover. Currently the charter operator Helvetic Airways and Peoples Airways offer a limited number of flights during the holiday season, the Swiss Federal Government's air transport service Lufttransportdienst des Bundes have based two business jets at the aerodrome, the Helicopter Emergency Medical Service operator REGA has one of its bases at Belp and two helicopter transport companies as well as two flying schools (one motorised, one for gliders) operate at the aerodrome.

== History ==
The aerodrome was established in 1929 by Alpar, a private airline that operated within Switzerland until the outbreak of World War II. After the war, Alpar remained in business as the aerodrome's operator, supported by subsidies from the cantonal and city governments. A planned expansion in 1947 did not pass in a popular referendum, and it was not until 1950 that the first concrete airstrip was built. In 2014, Alpar was renamed to Flughafen Bern AG.

Multiple attempts to build an international airport in or around Bern instead of the small regional aerodrome at Belpmoos failed. In 1945, the national parliament decided to build the first international airport, now Zurich Airport, at Kloten near Zürich instead of in Utzensdorf near Bern, though development plans there were retained as an inter-urban airport which would require less space and thus placate local opposition by farming interests. A 1963 airport project near Herrenschwanden was abandoned because of strong popular opposition, notably by farmers, as was a 1966 project in Rosshäusern and a 1970 project in Kallnach.

In December 2016, bmi regional ceased its flights from Munich Airport to Bern after two years which it served in direct competition with SkyWork Airlines. In May 2018, RUAG announced that it would close its operation at the aerodrome in September 2018, citing declining business.

In August 2018, the aerodrome's largest carrier SkyWork Airlines declared bankruptcy and ceased all operations leaving Helvetic Airways as the sole Swiss airline serving the aerodrome with 84 percent less traffic. Since then, however, Chair Airlines, also a Swiss Airline, has begun offering services to the airport.

== Facilities ==
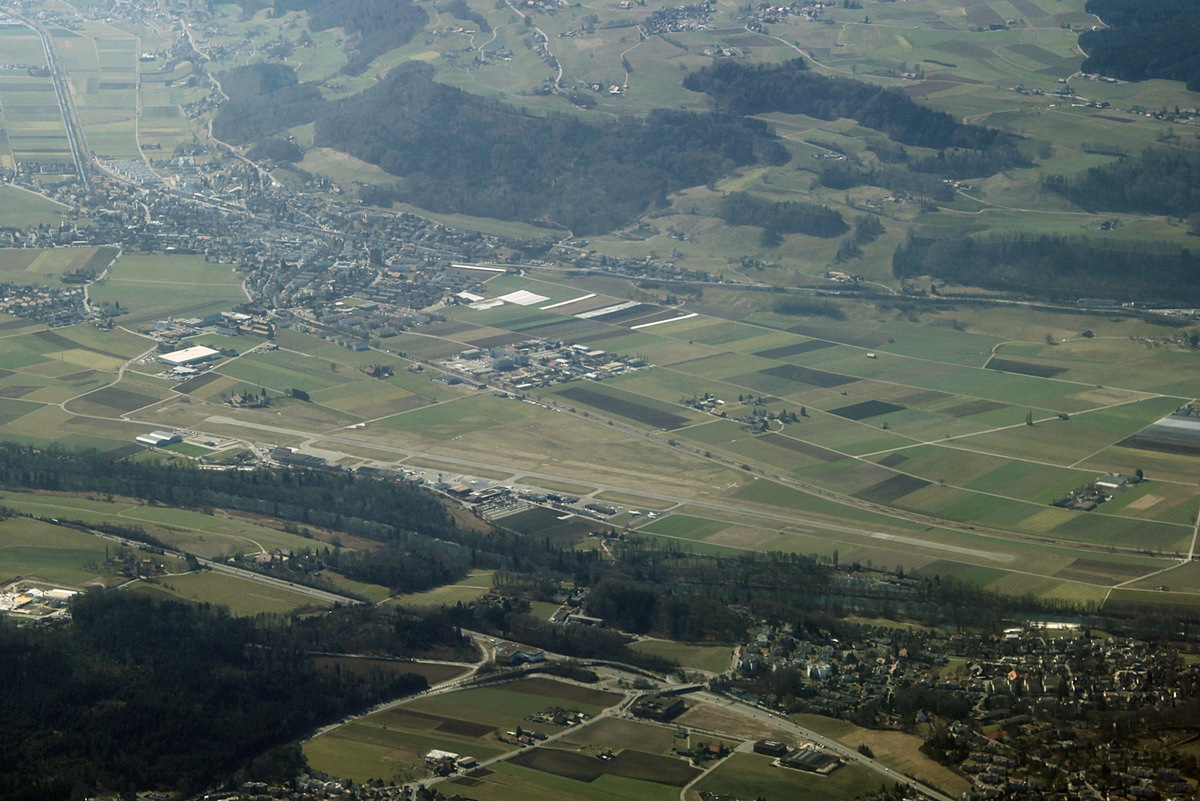
Aerial view of Bern Aerodrome

The aerodrome has multiple touchdown areas, a paved runway (14/32 of 1,730 metres (5,676 ft)), a grass runway (32L/14R of 650 metres (2,133 ft, as of 2017 inoperable)), a heli-square, and a glider area. Runway 14 has an ILS approach and an NDB approach (for training use only, will be decommissioned in 2019). The existing terminal was expanded to better accommodate flights to the non-Schengen area in 2011.

The Biderhangar, one of the aerodrome's hangars built by Swiss aviation pioneer Oskar Bider, is listed as a heritage site of national significance. The aerodrome also houses the head office of Heliswiss. Previously the North Terminal housed the head office of SkyWork Airlines.

== Other usage ==
The aircraft of the air transport service of the Swiss Air Force are stationed at Bern Regional Aerodrome. These are two jets and two turboprops. The former ones are mainly used for VIP transport and particularly the transport of members of the Federal Council. They are also used for other purposes, for example deportations or to support international peacekeeping measures. The two turboprop DHC-6 Twin Otter and Beechcraft King Air are not usually used for VIP flights, but for the passenger transport as well as for the country's topography service. The Beechcraft 1900 is also used by the country's topography service for the same tasks. The two jets are a Dassault Falcon 900 and a Cessna Citation Excel.

Additionally, Bern Regional Aerodrome serves as the homebase of the Federal Office of Civil Aviation. A base of the air rescue organization Rega is also located at the Airport, using a Eurocopter EC 145.

== Airlines and destinations ==
The following airlines currently offer seasonal and seasonal charter flights at Bern Airport:

Airlines	Destinations
Avanti Air	Seasonal charter: Calvi
Chair Airlines	Seasonal charter: Jerez de la Frontera
Helvetic Airways	Seasonal: Djerba, Heraklion, Kos, Larnaca, Monastir, Palma de Mallorca, Rhodes
Sky Alps	Seasonal charter: Cagliari, Olbia

The nearest international airports are EuroAirport Basel Mulhouse Freiburg, located 119 km (74 mi) north, and Zurich Airport, located 140 km (87 mi) north east of Bern Airport.

== Statistics ==
Year	Passengers	Change
2010	85,981	▼9.6%
2011	169,288	▲96.9%
2012	258,543	▲52.7%
2013	244,699	▼5.4%
2014	177,539	▼27.5%
2015	190,032	▲7.0%
2016	183,319	▼3.5%
2017	182,917	▼0.2%
2018	151,621	▼17.1%

== Ground transportation ==
Two bus lines serve the airport: the AirportBus Bern (line 334) connects the terminal every half-hour with Belp railway station where passengers can connect to frequent S-Bahn trains S3, S4, S31 and S44 to Bern main station. The journey time to Bern city center is 30 minutes. The bus line 160 connects the airport with Belp, Rubigen and Münsingen (connection to S-Bahn trains S1).

== See also ==
- Transport in Switzerland
- List of the busiest airports in Switzerland
