= Helvetic Airways =

Regional airline of Switzerland

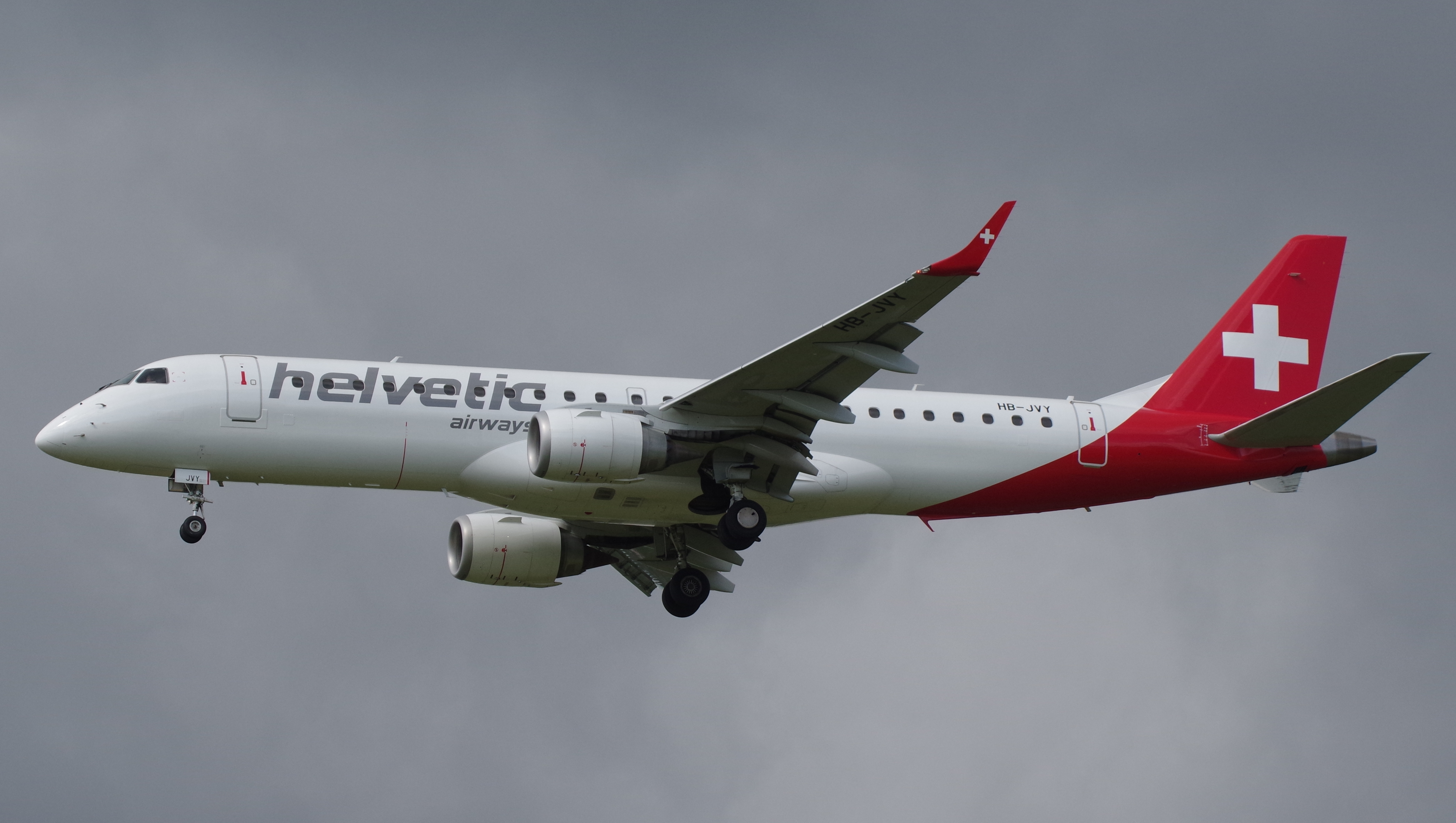
- A Helvetic Airways Embraer E190
IATA	ICAO	Call sign
2L	OAW	HELVETIC
- Founded: 2003; 23 years ago
- AOC #: CH.AOC.1033
- Hubs: Basel/Mulhouse; Bern; Zürich
- Fleet size: 20
- Destinations: 34
- Parent company: Helvetic Airways AG
- Headquarters: Kloten, canton of Zürich, Switzerland
- Key people: Tobias Pogorevc, CEO
- Employees: About 400
- Website: www.helvetic.com/en

Helvetic Airways, previously named Odette Airways, is a Swiss regional airline headquartered in Kloten with its fleet stationed at Zurich Airport. It operates flights to destinations in Europe and Northern Africa, mainly leisure markets, on its own behalf, as well as scheduled flights on behalf of Swiss International Air Lines, Lufthansa, and starting in summer 2026, Condor, using its fleet of Embraer 190s and Embraer 190-E2s.

== History ==
Helvetic Airways was established in the autumn of 2003, as a rebranding and extension of the existing airline Odette Airways, to serve destinations in South-Eastern Europe. Switzerland's first budget carrier began operating in November, with a Fokker 100 flying to three destinations. By 2004, the fleet had grown to seven aircraft.

In December 2006, the carrier unveiled a new look for its aircraft. Since then, all the Fokker 100s have livery in red-white-silver grey colours, with the Swiss cross on the tailfin.

In October 2010, the Swiss news media announced a new base in Bern Airport.

On 18 February 2013, in the 2013 Belgian diamond heist, eight men armed with automatic weapons and dressed in police uniforms seized 120 small parcels, containing an estimated $50 million (£32,000,000) worth of diamonds from a Helvetic Airways Fokker 100 passenger plane, loaded with passengers preparing for departure to Zürich. The men drove two vehicles through a hole they had cut in the airport's perimeter fence to Flight LX789, which had just been loaded with diamonds from a Brink's armoured van. The men were able to execute the operation within five minutes with no injuries and without firing a shot.

In December 2014, Helvetic Airways began to take over seven Embraer 190s, which were freed by Niki changing their fleet.

Since March 2016, there is a wet-lease contract with Lufthansa for the Zürich-Munich route.

In 2018, Swiss International Air Lines (SWISS) expanded its partnership with Helvetic Airways, announcing that it will deploy up to eight Helvetic Airways Embraer E190-E2 aircraft or similar equipment on its route network, from 2019 onwards. On 14 June 2019, the last Helvetic Airways Fokker 100 left the fleet. Shortly after, on 29 October 2019, the carrier took delivery of its first Embraer E190-E2 aircraft.

Since mid-2026 German airline Condor has utilised Helvetic Airways under a wet-lease agreement. The Swiss carrier operates two Embraer E-190s for Condor's city network.

=== Weathering the COVID-19 pandemic ===
During a 2022 company conference, Martin Ebner, owner of the airline, discussed how Helvetic decided not to push for a contract with Swiss International Air Lines requiring the latter to pay its wet lease fees while airline fleets were grounded during the COVID-19 pandemic, losing out on millions. In doing so, Ebner argued Helvetic helped ease Swiss' ticket refund burden during the pandemic. Despite this, Swiss subsequently reduced its wet-lease agreement with Helvetic from eight to four aircraft, a move Ebner considered a "breach of contract" that worsened Helvetic's pandemic struggles. Nevertheless, Helvetic Airways refunded travel agencies and all of its affected passengers promptly. They were able to afford this by relying on reduced lease rates payable to parent company, Helvetic Group, and switching to a less costly short-term temporary employment model with less hours of work for its pilots, crew and other employees (entailing less compensation). Further, unlike Swiss, the company did not receive government aid and had secured financing for its new Embraer jets using its own funds (themselves secured by Ebner's own assets), ultimately weathering the crisis.

== Ownership ==
Helvetic Airways is fully owned by Swiss businessman Martin Ebner.

== Destinations ==
Scheduled destinations as of January 2024 (not included are the routes served for Swiss International Air Lines on a long-term wet-lease contract):

Country	City	Airport	Notes	Refs
Albania	Kukës	Kukës International Airport Zayed	Terminated	
Albania	Tirana	Tirana International Airport	Seasonal	
Cyprus	Larnaca	Larnaca International Airport	Seasonal	
Egypt	Hurghada	Hurghada International Airport	Seasonal	
Finland	Kittilä	Kittilä Airport	Seasonal	
Finland	Kuusamo	Kuusamo Airport	Terminated	
France	Bordeaux	Bordeaux–Mérignac Airport	Terminated	
France	Calvi	Calvi – Sainte-Catherine Airport	Terminated	
France	Lourdes	Tarbes–Lourdes–Pyrénées Airport ^{Charter}	Terminated	
Germany	Rostock	Rostock–Laage Airport	Terminated	
Greece	Heraklion	Heraklion International Airport	Seasonal	
Greece	Kos	Kos International Airport	Seasonal	
Greece	Preveza	Aktion National Airport ^{Charter}	Terminated	
Greece	Rhodes	Rhodes International Airport ^{Charter}	Terminated	
Greece	Santorini	Santorini (Thira) International Airport	Seasonal	
Ireland	Shannon	Shannon Airport	Terminated	
Italy	Olbia	Olbia Costa Smeralda Airport	Terminated	
Kosovo	Pristina	Pristina International Airport ^{Charter}	Terminated	
Luxembourg	Luxembourg	Luxembourg Airport	Terminated	
North Macedonia	Ohrid	Ohrid St. Paul the Apostle Airport ^{Charter}		
North Macedonia	Skopje	Skopje International Airport ^{Charter}	Terminated	
Norway	Tromsø	Tromsø Airport ^{Charter}	Terminated	
Spain	Jerez de la Frontera	Jerez Airport	Terminated	
Spain	Palma de Mallorca	Palma de Mallorca Airport	Seasonal	
Switzerland	Bern	Bern Airport	Hub	
Switzerland	Zurich	Zurich Airport	Hub	
Switzerland; France; Germany	Basel; Mulhouse; Freiburg	EuroAirport Basel Mulhouse Freiburg	Hub	
Tunisia	Djerba	Djerba–Zarzis International Airport	Seasonal	
Turkey	Antalya	Antalya Airport	Seasonal	

=== Codeshare agreements ===
- Swiss International Air Lines

=== Interline agreements ===
- Hahn Air

== Fleet ==
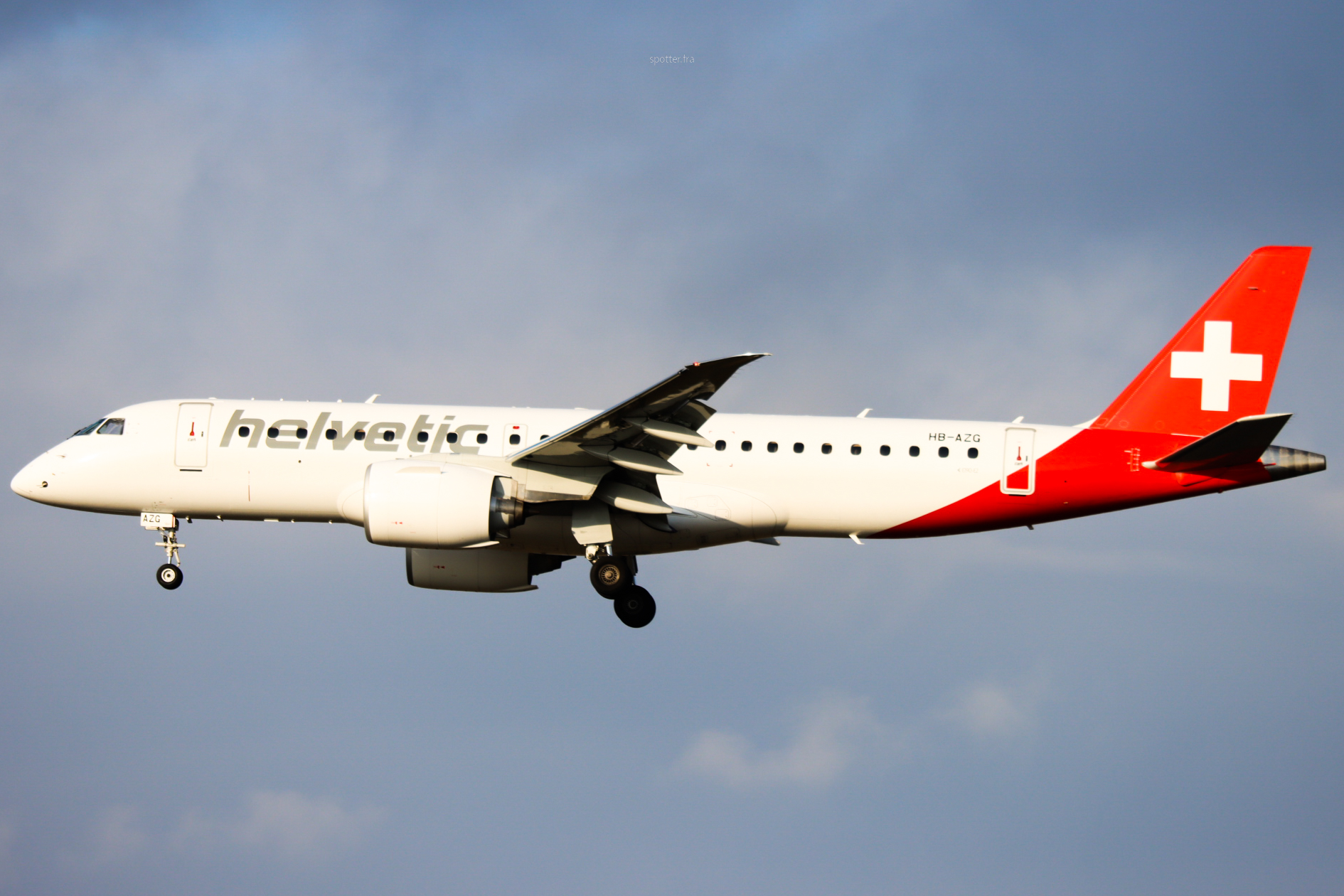
Helvetic Airways Embraer 190-E2

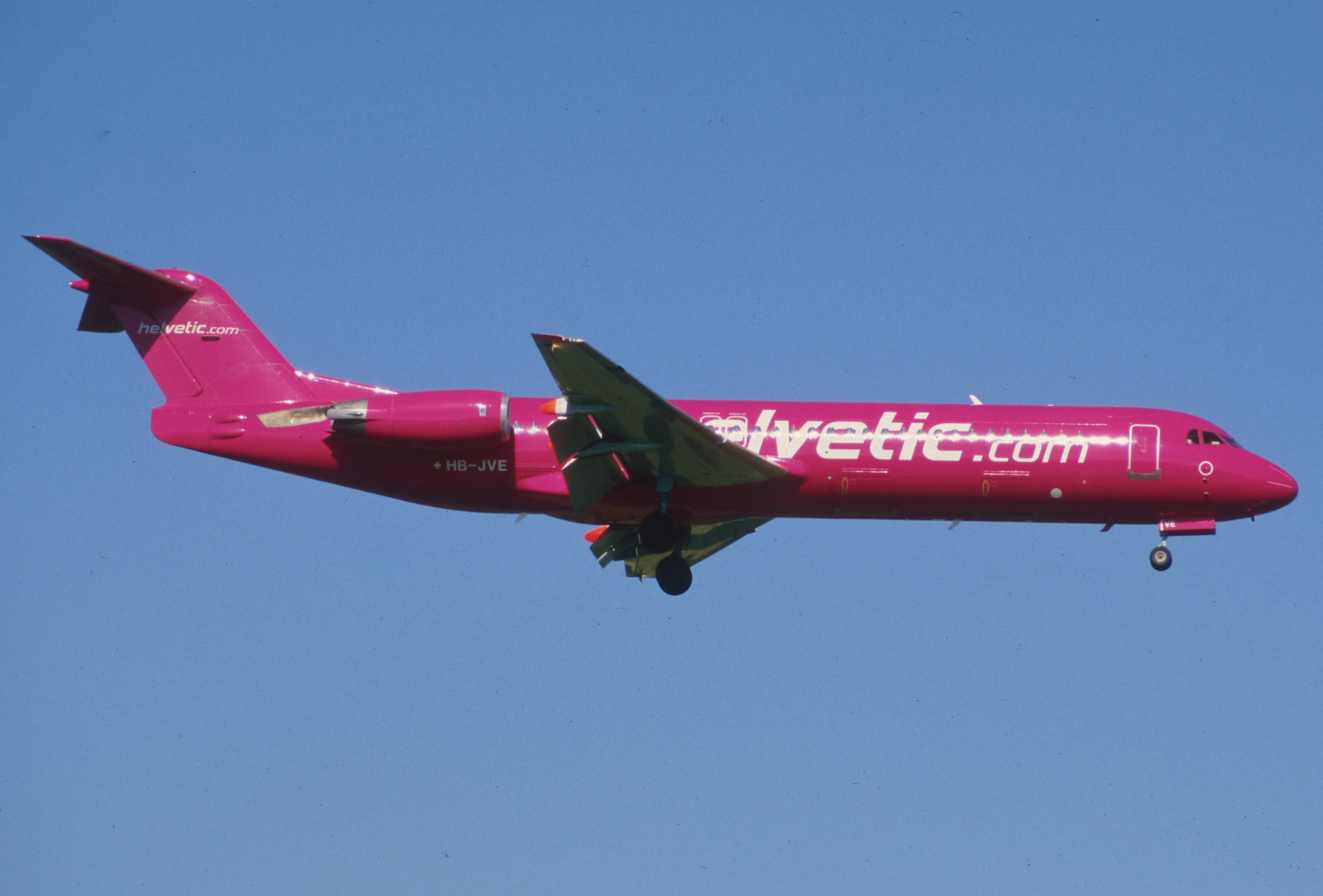
A former Helvetic Airways Fokker 100 in an earlier livery (2004).

=== Current fleet ===
As of August 2026, Helvetic Airways operates the following aircraft:

Helvetic Airways fleet
Aircraft	In service	Orders	Passengers	Notes
Embraer E190	4	—	112	Operated for Swiss International Air Lines.
Embraer E195	4	—	122	Leased from summer 2024.
Embraer E190-E2	8	—	110	Order with 12 purchase rights.
Embraer E195-E2	4	3	134	Order with 5 purchase rights.
Total	22	3		

=== Historic fleet ===
In the past, Helvetic Airways has operated the following types of aircraft:

- Airbus A319-100
- Fokker 100
- McDonnell Douglas MD-83
