= Sion Airport =

Sion Airport Aéroport de Sion
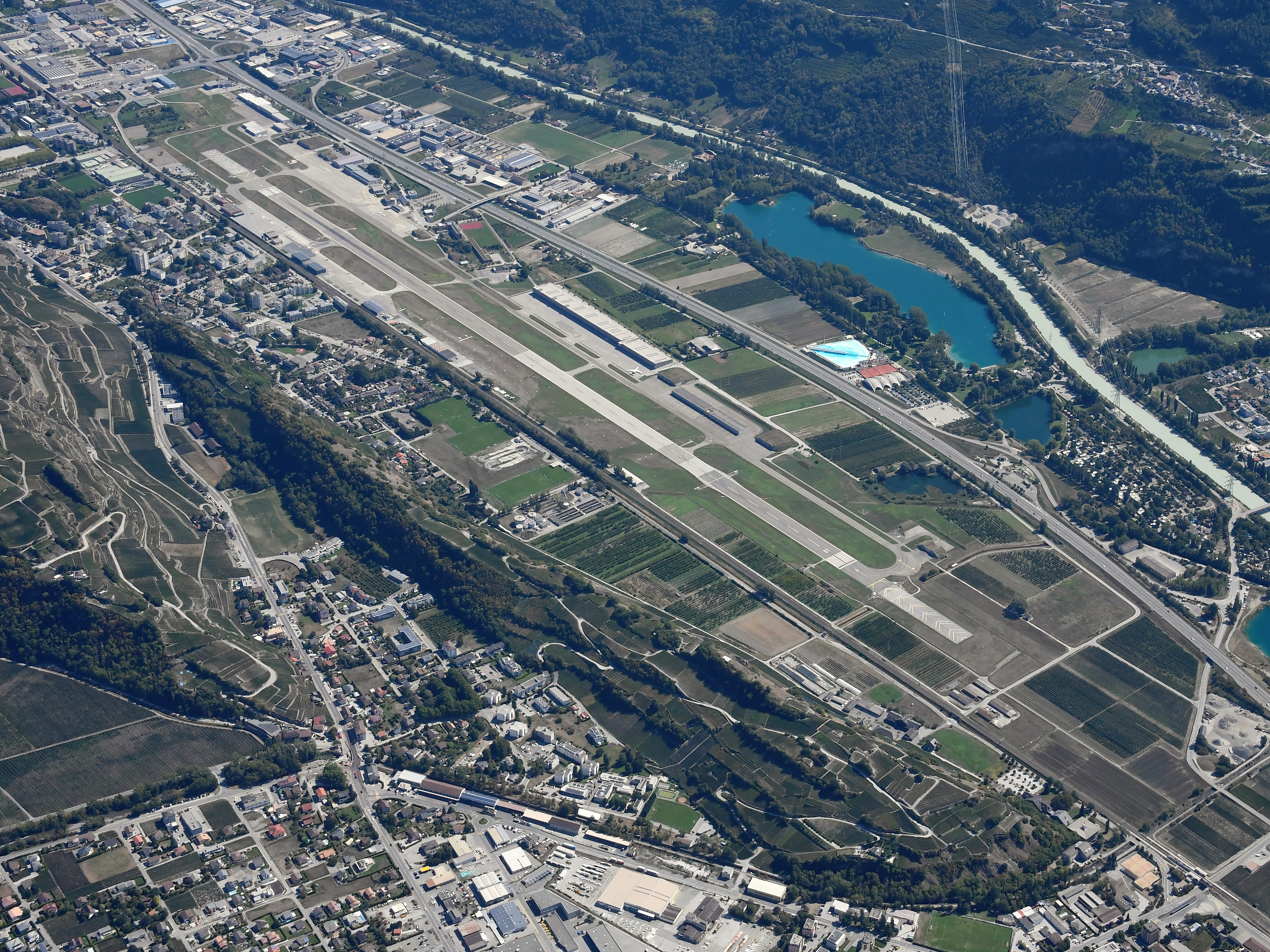
- IATA: SIR; ICAO: LSGS / LSMS

Summary
- Serves: Sion, Switzerland
- Elevation AMSL: 483 m (1,585 ft)
- Coordinates: 46°13′10.53″N 7°19′36.35″E
- Website: sionairport.ch

Map
- Location of airport in Switzerland

Runways
Direction	Length		Surface
Direction	ft	m	Surface
07R/25L	6,562	2,000	Asphalt
07L/25R	1,820	555	Grass

Statistics (2025)
- Total passengers: 39,587
- Aircraft operations: 43,888
- Source: Statistics from Sion Airport.

Sion Airport (Note: French: Aéroport de Sion, German: Flughafen Sitten, Italian: Aeroporto di Sion, Romansh: Eroport da Sion) (IATA: SIR, ICAO: LSGS) (Military: LSMS) is the airport of the city of Sion, Switzerland and is located 2.5 km southwest of Sion city in the Rhone Valley. The airport opened in 1935.

== Airlines and destinations ==
The following airlines operate seasonal and seasonal charter flights at Sion Airport:

Airlines	Destinations
Helvetic Airways	Seasonal: Palma de Mallorca

The nearest larger international airport is Geneva Airport, approx. 110 kilometres (68 mi) to the west, while the smaller Bern Airport is equidistant to the north.

Swiss regional airline Air Mountain ceased operations on 26 May 2026 and was officially declared bankrupt by the Court of Sion on 27 May 2026. There is currently no plan to resume operation. Air Mountain connected Sion with a King Air 200 seasonal in summer with Saint Tropez, Elba, Alghero, Rome and Calvi.

== Statistics ==
Below are the statistics since 2015 according to Sion Airport's Website

Sion Airport annual traffic statistics
Year	Flights (movements)	Passengers
2025	43,888	39,587
2024	41,965	31,842
2023	41,925	35,929
2022	43,586	35,929
2021	41,857	25,970
2020	37,348	21,698
2019	38,088	25,992
2018	41,072	32,794
2017	41,218	32,477
2016	36,346	25,803
2015	40,242	32,550

== Planned development ==
To increase regional tourism and economy, the Canton of Valais released a proposed legislation in early 2024 for the Airport. The plan proposed the complete restructuring of the Airport's management and increasing the charter and seasonal flights it operates. It included the creation of a new public-majority company to manage all of the airport's operations. Following a period of consultation, the canton announced on the 27th of March 2024 that it would not follow the draft law. As a consequence, the existing concession held by the City of Sion will remain in effect until 2031, with no immediate reform or expansion project in the works. As of October 2025, Sion Airport still holds some commercial flight. It has been identified as a potential site for sustainable aviation initiatives which include projects with companies like H55 and research institutions such as EPFL and HES-SO.

== Military usage ==
The Swiss Air Force uses Sion as one of their four jetfighter air bases, the others being Payerne, Meiringen and Emmen. It is known as Flugplatzkommando 14 Sion. In addition to the prop-types Pilatus PC-6, Pilatus PC-7, Pilatus PC-9 and Pilatus PC-21 as well as helicopters, it uses Sion intensively with the fighter jets F/A-18 and F-5 Tiger. It is the home base of the militia pilot unit Fliegerstaffel 19 Swans with F-5E. Sion Airport is, at both ends of the runway, equipped with retractable arresting gear devices (used by the F/A-18 and in case of a problem by the F-5).

Due to the redimension of the Swiss Air Force, it was planned that the Air Force would leave Sion after 2017 and Sion would be used by civil aviation only, acting only as alternate airfield for the Air Force.

== See also ==
- Transport in Switzerland
