= Darwin Airline =

Regional airline in Switzerland (2003–2017)

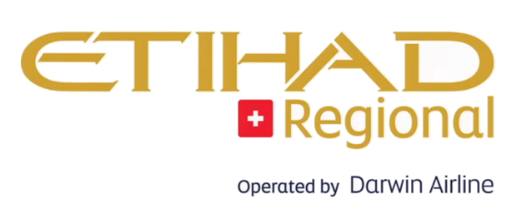

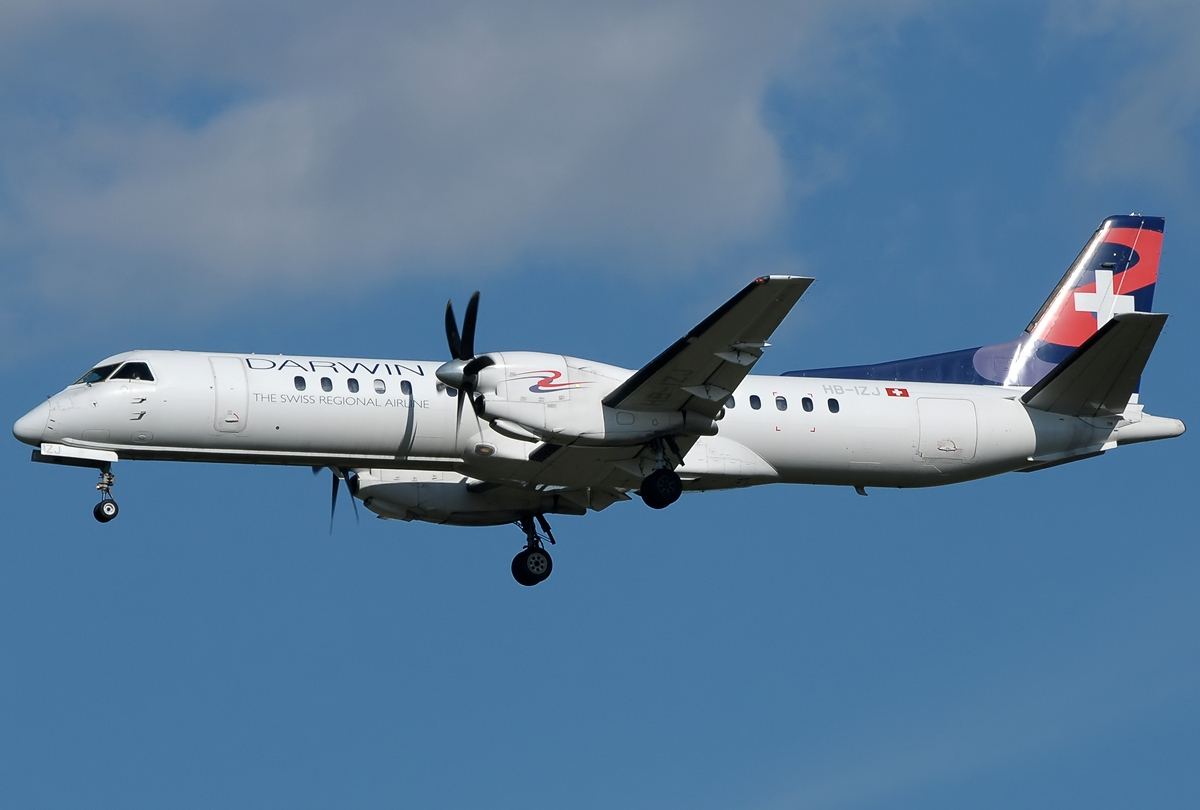
- A Darwin Airline Saab 2000
IATA	ICAO	Call sign
F7	DWT	DARWIN
- Founded: 12 August 2003
- Commenced operations: 28 July 2004
- Ceased operations: 12 December 2017
- Hubs: Geneva; Lugano
- Parent company: Adria Airways
- Headquarters: Bioggio, Lugano, Switzerland
- Key people: Emilio Martinenghi (President)
- Employees: 314 (as of October 2014)

Darwin Airline SA was a Swiss regional airline with its head office in Bioggio, Lugano flying under the brand name Adria Airways Switzerland. It operated scheduled domestic and international services in some western European countries. It used the brand name Etihad Regional from January 2014 to July 2017, when Etihad Airways sold its 33% stake to the owner of Adria Airways. It previously also operated flights on behalf of Alitalia. Its bases were Geneva Airport and Lugano Airport.

In November 2017, the Swiss authorities suspended the airline's license for scheduled flights due to financial difficulties but allowed the wetlease operations to be continued. On 12 December 2017, the airline was declared bankrupt and ceased all remaining operations after its license was voided, while some of its fleet was transferred to its owner Adria Airways; the Saab 2000 aircraft operated scheduled services from Ljubljana Airport in the name of Adria Airways with the aircraft still carrying the Adria Airways Switzerland livery until Adria declared bankruptcy in 2019.

== History ==
=== Early years ===
Darwin Airline was established on 12 August 2003 and operations started on 28 July 2004. By October 2013 it had 220 employees.

On 25 November 2010, Darwin Airline announced its plans to take over some Baboo operating assets by early 2011. Under the plan, some parts of the combined airline would continue to be marketed under the Baboo name, while Darwin would be able to substantially expand their operations.

At the time of the merger, Baboo had returned its fleet of three leased Embraer E-190 to their lessors and only the remaining two Bombardier DHC-8-Q400 were transferred to Darwin Airline to be used on high-density routes as the 74-seater offered a substantial increase in seats compared to the Saab 2000. Later both DHC-8-Q400 were sold as they had too much capacity for the Darwin Airline's network.

On 2 September 2013, Darwin Airline opened a base at Cambridge with flights to Amsterdam, Paris-Charles de Gaulle, Milan Malpensa and its Geneva base using Saab 2000 aircraft. These services were suspended in early 2014 due to low demand.

=== Cooperation with Etihad Airways ===
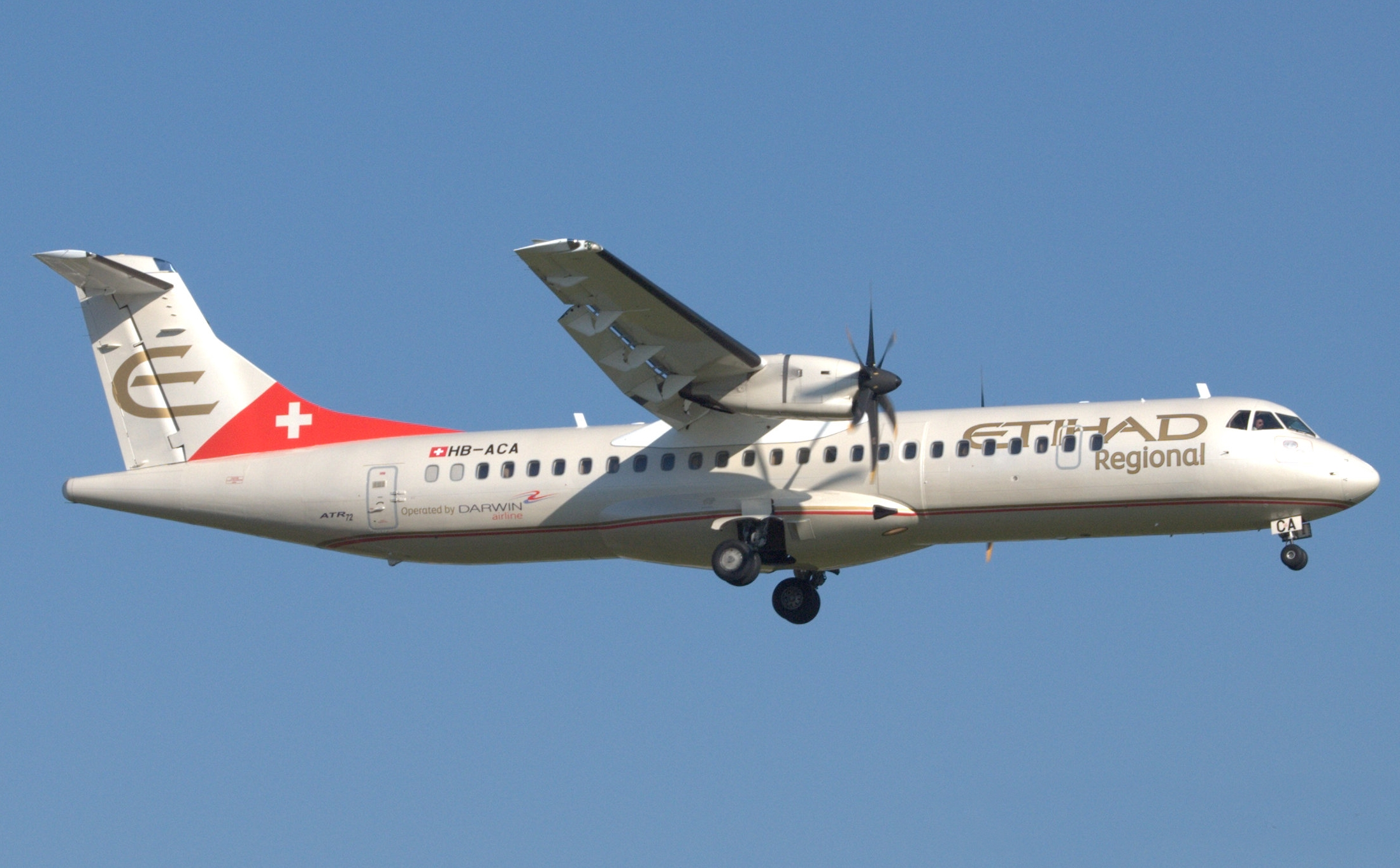
Darwin Airline ATR 72-500 in former Etihad Regional livery

On 17 November 2013, Etihad Airways announced that it had bought a 33% stake in Darwin Airline. Following completion of the deal, Darwin used the name Etihad Regional with the subtitle "operated by Darwin Airline". The first Darwin aircraft featuring the Etihad Regional livery began operating between Lugano and Geneva on 17 January 2014; the airline announced that all ten of its Saab 2000 aircraft would be repainted in Etihad livery by the end of June 2014. Four ATR 72-500s leased to Etihad Regional were to also be painted in the new livery as soon as they are delivered to the company.

In early 2014, Etihad Regional leased four ATR 72-500s from Nordic Aviation Capital to expand routes from Geneva.

From the end of March 2014, the airline withdrew its Ancona-Roma Fiumicino and Trapani-Roma Fiumicino routes, as a result of cabotage restrictions, which prevent Swiss aviation companies from operating domestic flights in the European Union. It was previously possible for Darwin Airline to fly these routes thanks to a derogation from the Italian Civil Aviation Authority, however, this was not renewed. In January 2014, Darwin Airline cancelled its Aosta-Roma Fiumicino route before it had commenced; a result of the same cabotage and the European Union's refusal to make an exception for a Swiss company.

=== Reduction of operations ===
In February 2014 Etihad Regional cancelled the planned routes from Berlin to Poznań and Wrocław, as well as the Zagreb-Rome route. By October 2014, several more destinations like Lyon, Turin, and Stuttgart were also cancelled. Additionally, services between Lugano and Zürich, which were flown on behalf of Swiss International Air Lines until 30 October 2014, were also terminated as Swiss cancelled the contract.

In January 2015, it was reported that Etihad Regional faced harsh competition from Swiss International Air Lines, however, it was stated that Etihad had no plans to cancel the proposed purchase of a higher stake in Darwin Airline as suggested by some sources. However, by February 2015 the company cancelled further destinations like Linz and Toulouse and also announced they would lay off a fifth of its staff.

On 18 February 2015, Etihad Regional ceased two-thirds of its scheduled routes without further notice, amongst them all services to Germany and several to France. The airline continued to operate some of their domestic and European routes from Geneva and Lugano as well as the Italian domestic service from Bolzano to Rome while all services to and from Zürich were cancelled immediately except the domestic service to Geneva. Etihad Regional blamed competitors as well as the Swiss aviation authorities for their failed expansion.

On 11 March 2015, Darwin Airline confirmed it would start operating some of their Saab 2000s on behalf of Air Berlin, in which Etihad Airways also held a stake, from April 2015. On 29 March 2015, it was also announced that Darwin Airline will operate all of its four ATR72 on several domestic routes for Alitalia, in which Etihad Airways also holds a stake.

In November 2015, SkyWork Airlines announced the termination of their ACMI contract with Darwin by December 2015 due to crew shortage at Darwin. The operations on behalf of Air Berlin also ended by 30 April 2016, as Air Berlin started to operate two of the three routes itself while the third one ceased.

In May 2017, Darwin announced the termination of its Geneva-Zürich route on 29 May 2017, ending all operations in Zürich. The company plans to focus on Alitalia wetlease operations instead.

=== Adria Airways Switzerland ===
In July 2017, Darwin Airline was bought by the holding company that owned Adria Airways, the largest airline in Slovenia. Darwin reportedly remained a separate company operating as Adria Airways Switzerland. The new brand took over the fleet and current route network by September 2017 with all Etihad branding being removed from the website.

Shortly afterwards, it was announced that the airline would cease all scheduled operations and focus on ACMI services on behalf of other airlines. The ATR 72-500s will be returned to lessors. On 27 November 2017, Darwin Airline confirmed the closure of its base in Lugano by the end of 2017, with all routes to and from there ending, as well as the closure of all summer seasonal routes from its other base in Geneva, leaving the airline with scheduled year-round flights between Geneva, Lugano (until year-end) and Rome.

Soon after, Darwin Airline filed for bankruptcy protection stating a negative financial outlook due to the loss of wetlease agreements with bankrupt airlines Air Berlin and Alitalia. The airline's operating licence was suspended on 28 November 2017 by the Swiss authorities and all remaining flights were no longer operating until further notice. However, the Swiss authorities allowed the wetlease operations to be continued.

On 12 December 2017 it was announced that Darwin Airline had been declared bankrupt and would be dissolved while the operations licence had been voided. No further flights would be operated. At the same time, Adria Airways announced that by 2018 that Darwin Airline's Saab 2000 fleet would be taken over by its parent company while the ATR 72 would be returned to its lessor at the same time.

== Corporate affairs ==
Formerly its head office was on the grounds of Lugano Airport in Agno, near Lugano.

== Destinations ==
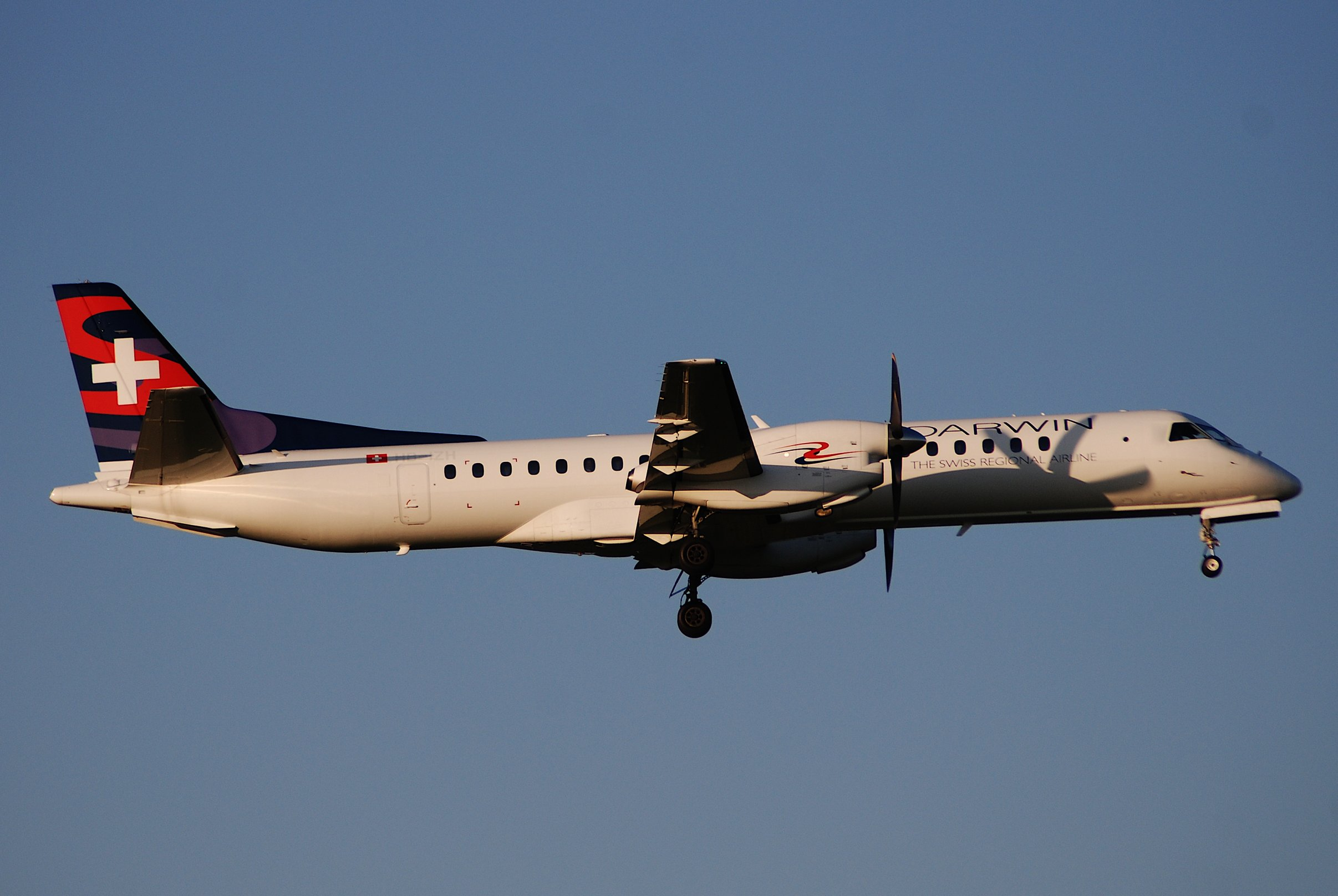
Darwin Airline Saab 2000 in the airline's own livery

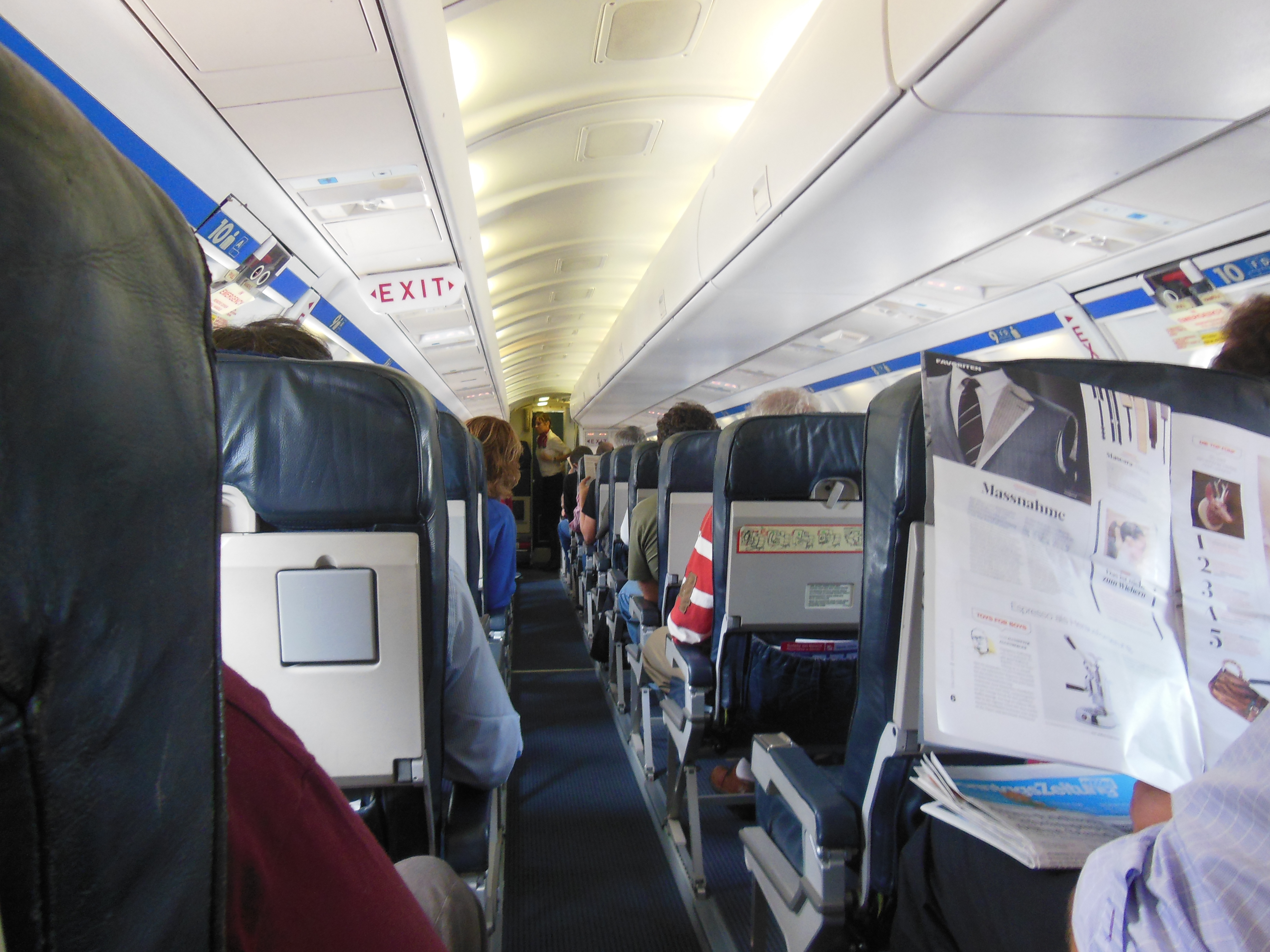
Interior of a Darwin Airline Saab 2000

As of September 2017, Darwin Airline served the following destinations using the Adria Airways Switzerland brand. All scheduled routes were suspended effective 28 November 2017.

Country	City	IATA	ICAO	Airport	Notes
France	Biarritz	BIQ	LFBZ	Biarritz Pays Basque Airport	Seasonal
France	Brest	BES	LFRB	Brest Bretagne Airport	Seasonal
Italy	Brindisi	BDS	LIBR	Brindisi Airport	Seasonal
Italy	Cagliari	CAG	LIEE	Cagliari Elmas Airport	Seasonal
Italy	Olbia	OLB	LIEO	Olbia Costa Smeralda Airport	Seasonal
Italy	Rome	FCO	LIRF	Leonardo da Vinci–Fiumicino Airport	
Spain	Ibiza	IBZ	LEIB	Ibiza Airport	Seasonal
Switzerland	Geneva	GVA	LSGG	Geneva Airport	Hub
Switzerland	Lugano	LUG	LSZA	Lugano Airport	

=== Codeshare agreements ===
Darwin Airline also had codeshare agreements with the following airlines:

- Air Serbia (between Zürich and Belgrade)
- Alitalia (between Geneva and Rome)
- Etihad Airways (between Geneva, Abu Dhabi, Mahé, Bangkok, Phuket and Kuala Lumpur)

== Fleet ==
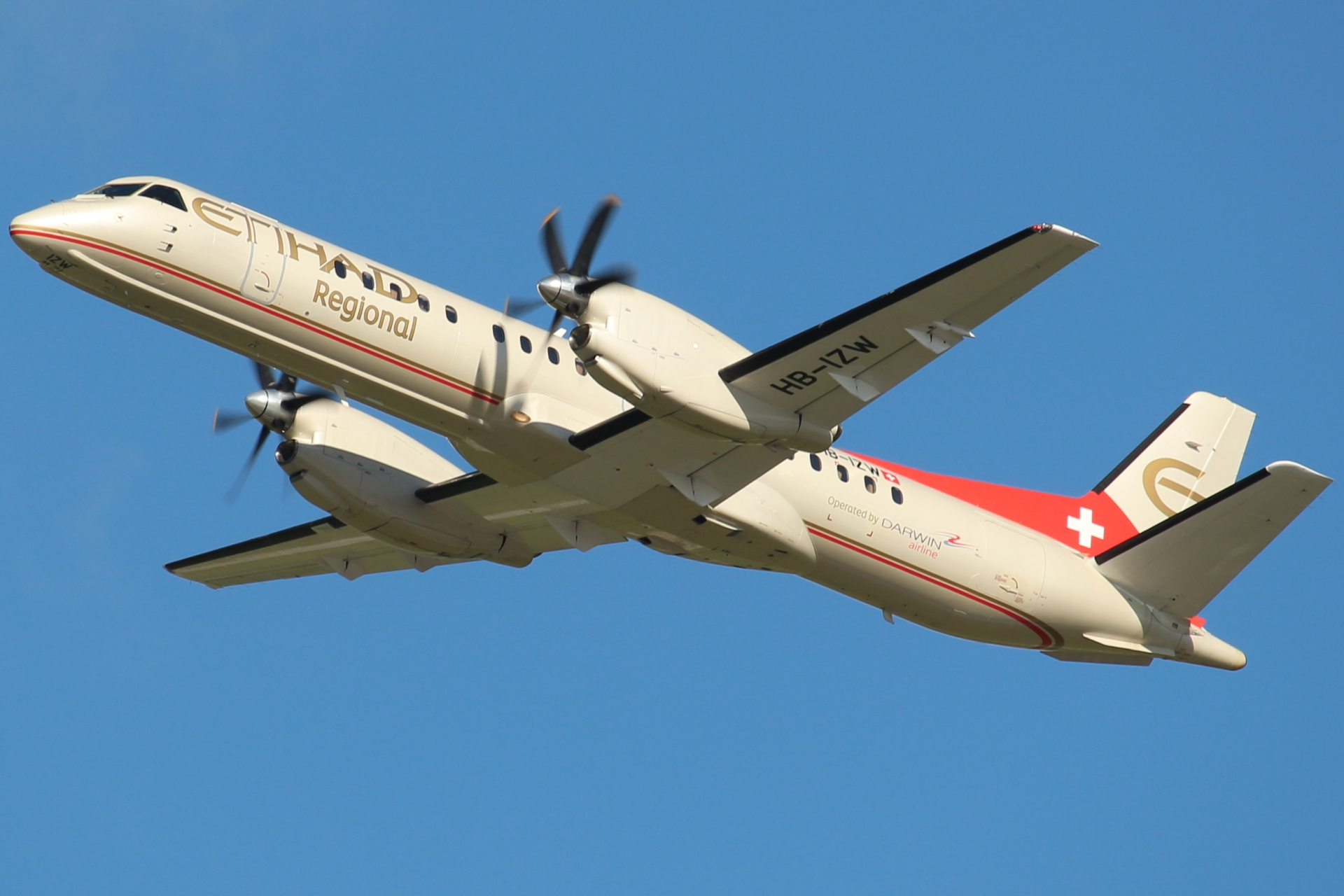
Darwin Airline Saab 2000 in its former Etihad Regional colors

As of September 2017, the Darwin Airline fleet included the following aircraft:

Darwin Airline fleet
Aircraft	In service	Orders	Passengers	Notes
ATR 72-500	4	—	68	were to be phased out in early 2018
Saab 2000	6	—	50	were operated as Adria Airways Switzerland
Total	10	—		

The airline also used 2 Bombardier Dash 8-400.
