= Easy Jet (disambiguation) =

EasyJet is a British low-cost airline group

Easy Jet may also refer to:

- Easy Jet (horse) (1967–1992) an American Quarter Horse that won the 1969 All American Futurity.
- EasyJet UK, a British low-cost airline
- EasyJet Switzerland (a.k.a. 'EasyJet'), a Swiss low-cost airline
- EasyJet Europe (a.k.a. 'EasyJet'), an Austrian low-cost airline

== See also ==
- EZjet (EZJ), defunct airline of Guyana
