= EasyJet Europe =

Low-cost airline of Austria

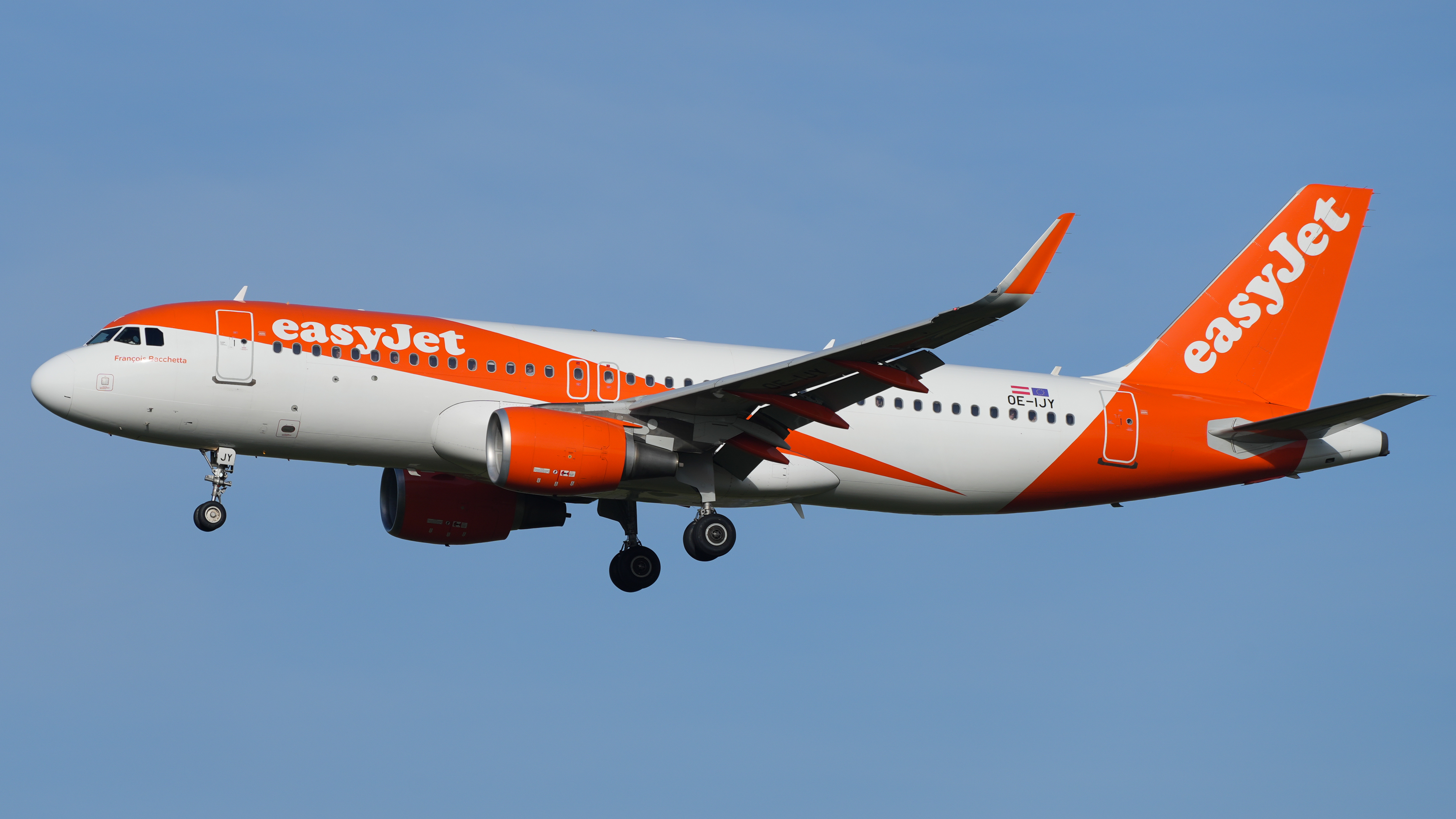
- Airbus A320-200
IATA	ICAO	Call sign
EC	EJU	ALPINE
- Founded: 18 July 2017; 8 years ago
- Commenced operations: 20 July 2017; 8 years ago
- Operating bases: Alicante (seasonal); Amsterdam; Barcelona; Berlin Brandenburg; Bordeaux; Faro (seasonal); Lisbon; Lyon; Málaga (seasonal); Marrakesh (from 1 May 2026); Milan–Malpensa (largest base); Nantes; Naples; Nice; Palma de Mallorca (seasonal); Paris–Charles de Gaulle; Paris–Orly; Porto Rome Fiumicino Milan Linate
- Fleet size: 135
- Destinations: same as EasyJet UK
- Parent company: EasyJet plc
- Headquarters: Vienna, Austria
- Key people: Thomas Haagensen (managing director)
- Website: www.easyjet.com

EasyJet Europe Airline GmbH (trading as easyJet) is a European low-cost airline founded in 2017 and based in Vienna, Austria. It operates scheduled flights across Europe and is a subsidiary of EasyJet plc.

== History ==
The airline was established on 18 July 2017 and started operations on 20 July 2017, with the first flight being an Airbus A320 (re-registered as OE-IVA, previously G-EZPA) flying from London Luton Airport to Vienna International Airport.The airline was established following the UK referendum vote to leave the European Union and the airline's decision to obtain an Air Operator's Certificate (AOC) in another EU member state in order to continue operating flights across and within European countries after the UK leaves the EU.

Many aircraft previously registered to EasyJet UK were reregistered to EasyJet Europe, and those staff employed by EasyJet UK but based elsewhere in the European Union transferred to EasyJet Europe. EasyJet announced that it was planning to re-register 110 aircraft to fly under the new AOC of EasyJet Europe by March 2019.

EasyJet is thus a pan-European airline group with three airlines based in the UK, Austria and Switzerland (EasyJet UK, EasyJet Europe, and EasyJet Switzerland), with the brand owned by EasyJet plc, based in the UK and listed on the London Stock Exchange. The division into separate companies was triggered by Brexit and the regulations of the EU, which specify that an airline must be based in an EU nation and primarily owned by an entity from the EU to qualify as domestic European carrier. This requirement is satisfied by the significant ownership held by EasyJet founder Stelios Haji-Ioannou and his family, who hold Greek-Cypriot citizenship.

On 30 March 2019, flights became operated by EasyJet Europe under their own flight numbers and callsign.

== Destinations ==
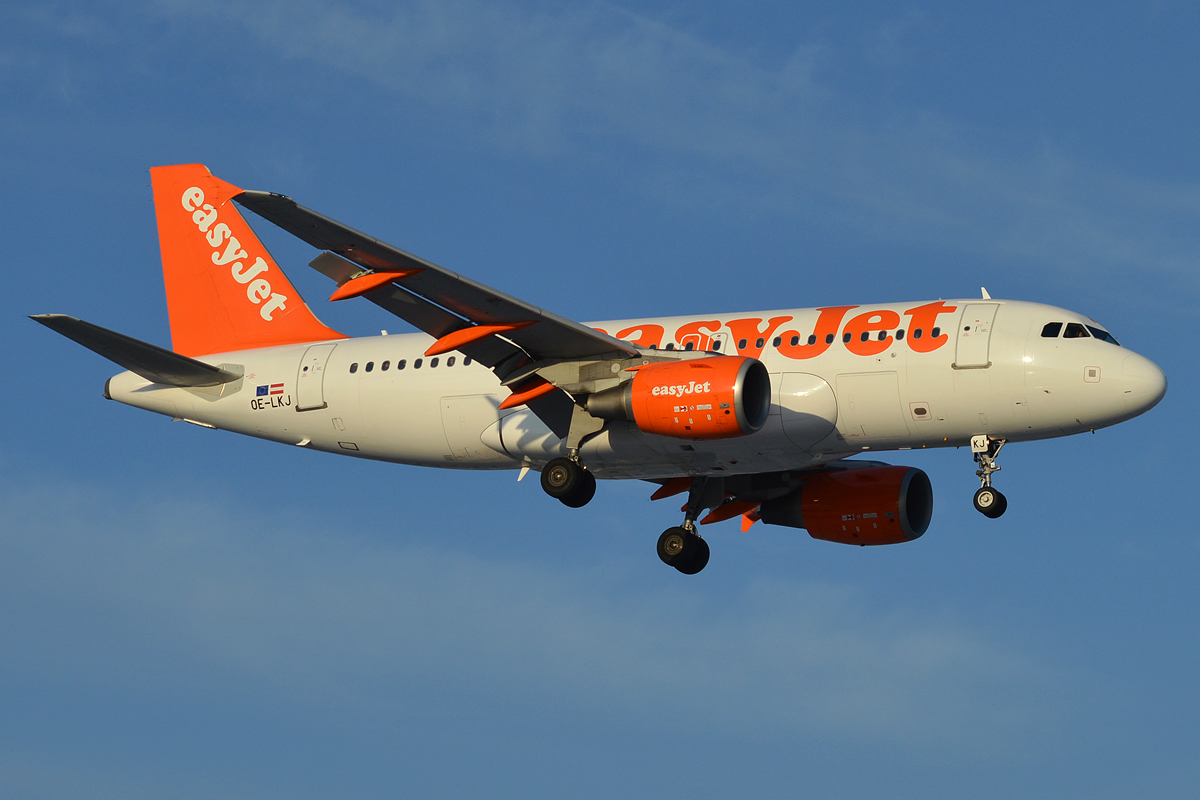
An Airbus A319-100 in the old livery

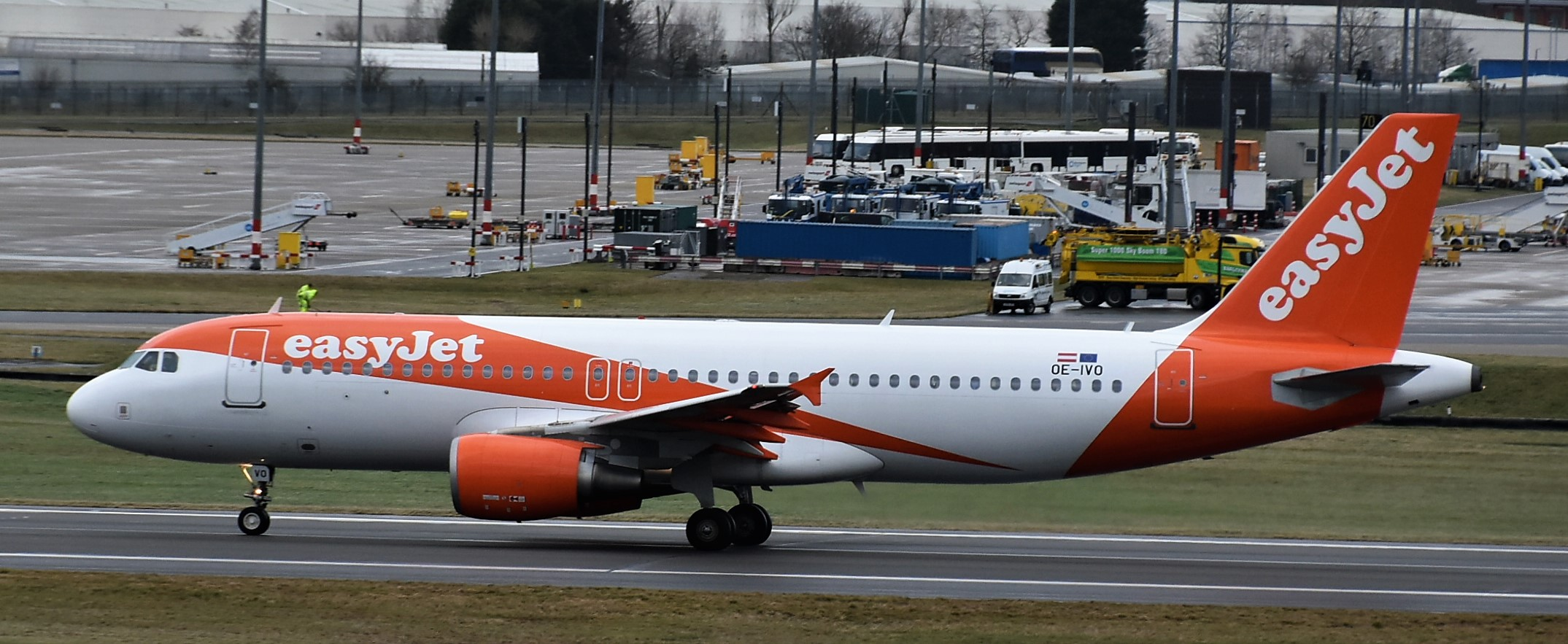
An Airbus A320-200 in the new livery

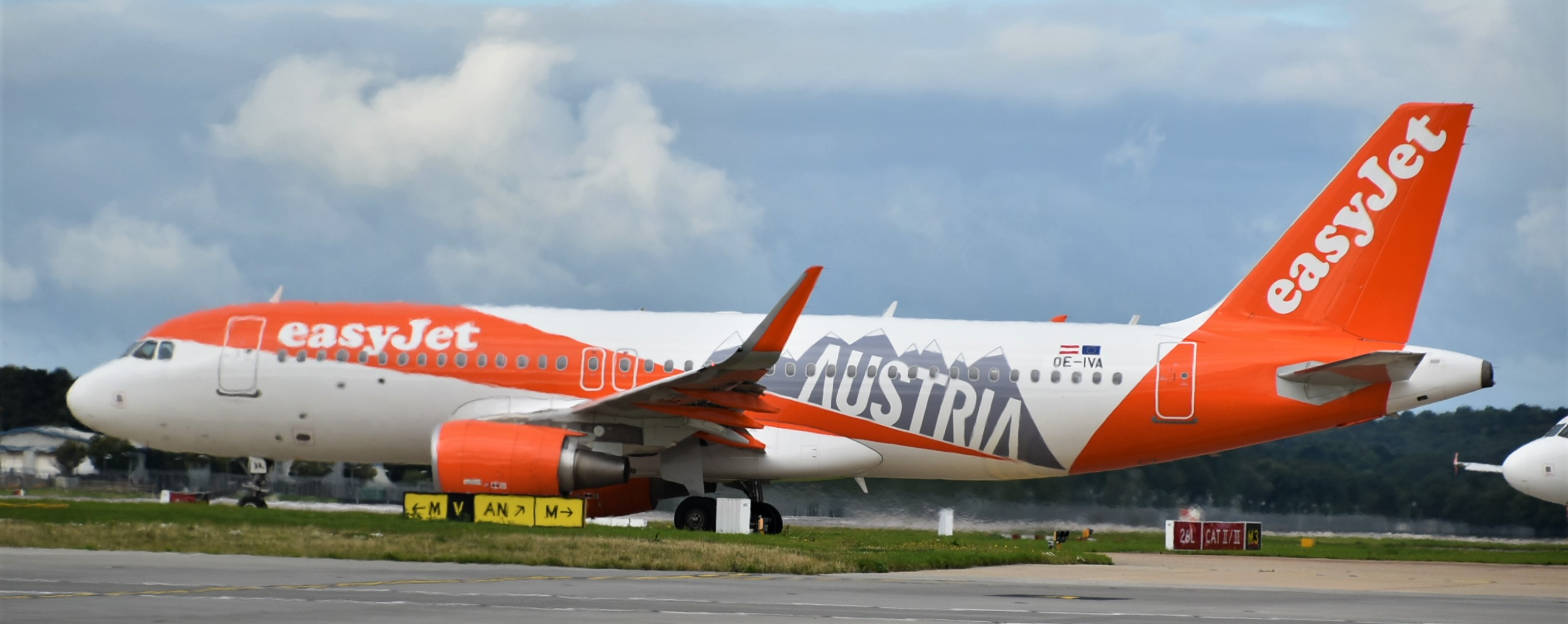
An Airbus A320-200 in special 'Austria' livery

EasyJet Europe operates in conjunction with the other EasyJet-branded airlines.

== Fleet ==
As of August 2025, EasyJet Europe operates an all-Airbus fleet composed of the following aircraft

EasyJet Europe fleet
Aircraft	In service	Orders	Passengers	Notes
Airbus A319-100	35	–	156	To be retired and replaced with Airbus A320neo.
Airbus A320-200	74	–	180	
Airbus A320-200	74	–	186	
Airbus A320neo	18	–	186	
Airbus A321neo	8	—	235	
Total	135	—		
