= EasyJet UK =

Low-cost airline of the United Kingdom

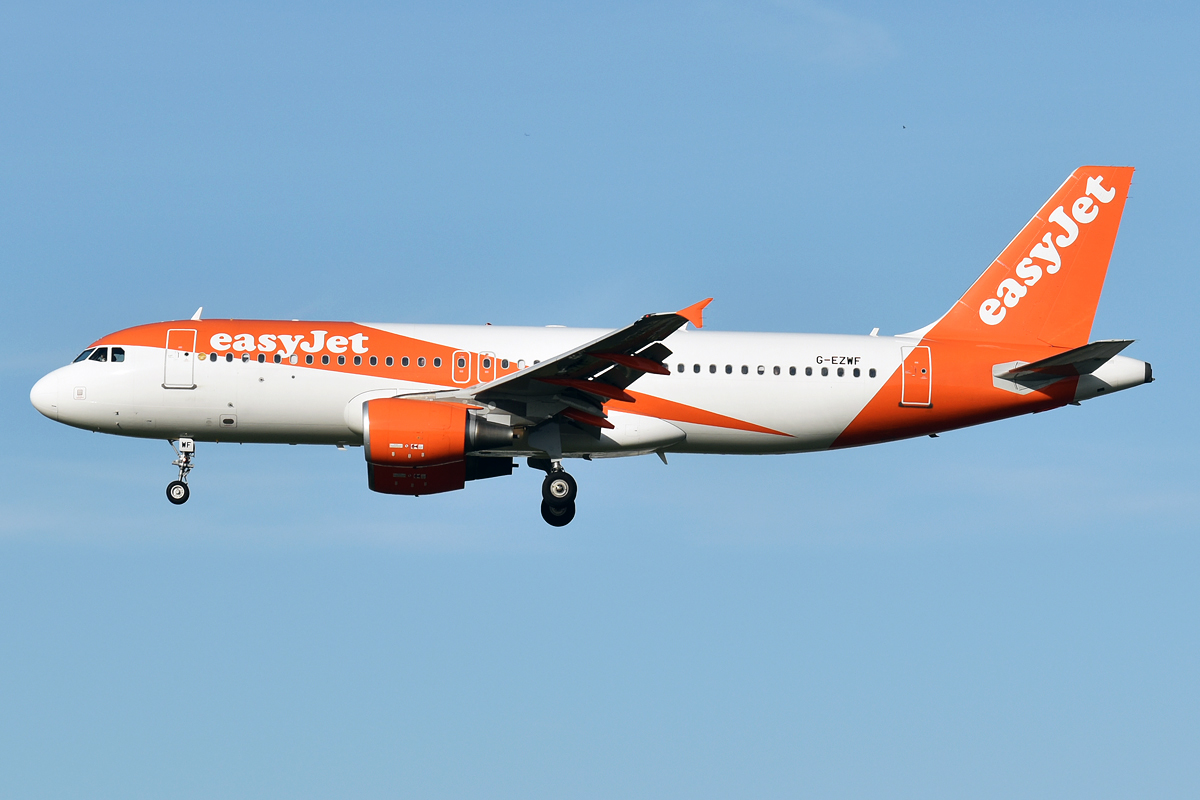
IATA	ICAO	Call sign
U2	EZY	EASY
- Founded: 27 July 2017; 8 years ago
- Commenced operations: 8 May 2018; 8 years ago
- AOC #: 2448
- Operating bases: Belfast–International; Birmingham; Bristol; Edinburgh; Glasgow; Liverpool; London–Gatwick; London–Luton; London–Southend; Manchester; Newcastle
- Fleet size: 188
- Destinations: 156
- Parent company: EasyJet plc
- Headquarters: Luton, England
- Website: www.easyjet.com

EasyJet UK Limited (styled as easyJet) is a British low-cost airline and a subsidiary of EasyJet plc. It was founded in 2017, after the UK Government triggered Article 50 to leave the European Union.

== History ==
The airline was established following the UK referendum vote to leave the European Union and the airline's preparation against possible outcomes of Brexit. EasyJet structured itself as a pan-European airline group with three different air operator's certificates, each based in Austria, Switzerland and the United Kingdom.

EasyJet plc is thus a pan-European airline group with three airlines based in the UK, Austria and Switzerland (easyJet UK, easyJet Europe, and easyJet Switzerland), and listed on the London Stock Exchange.

== Destinations ==
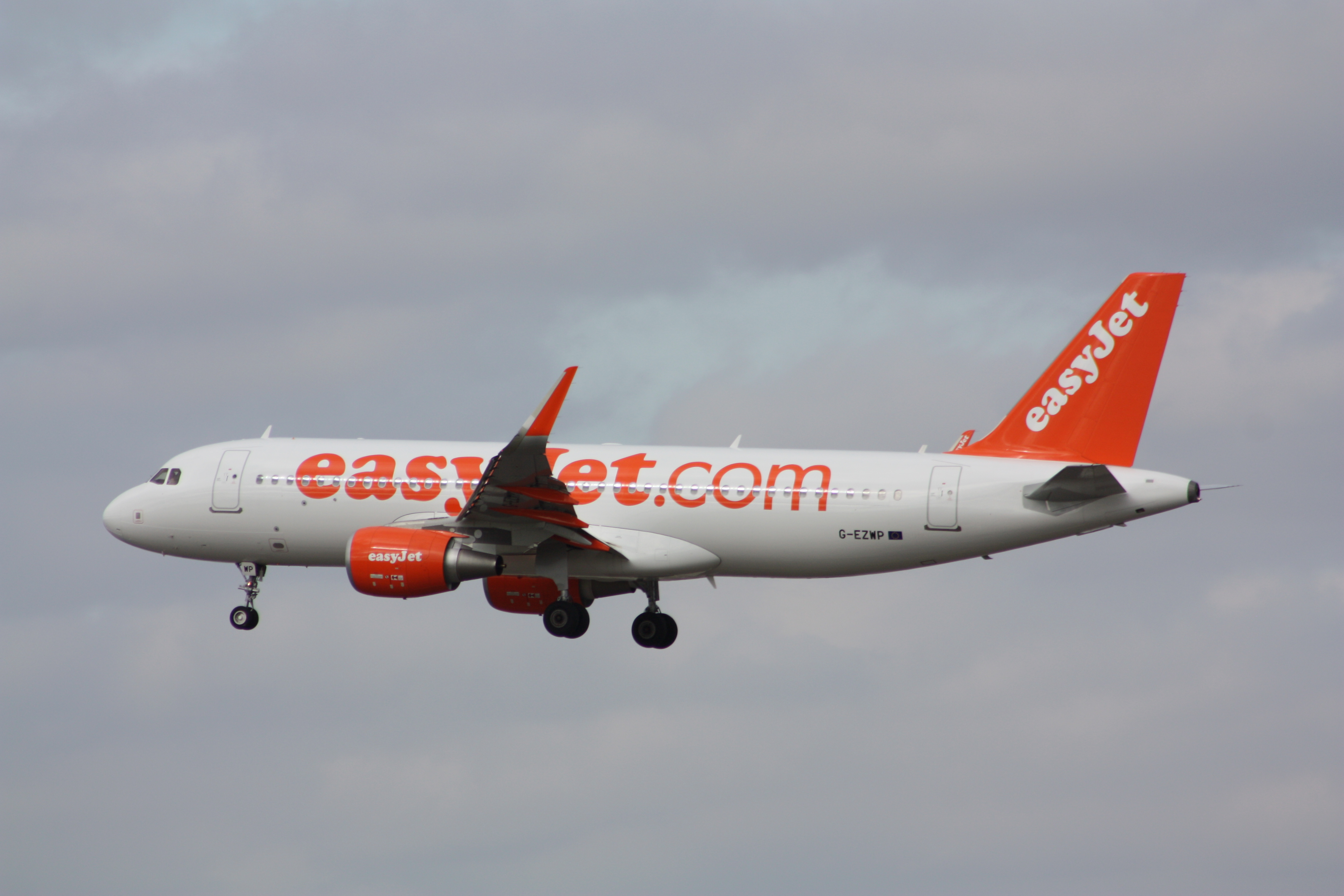
An EasyJet Airbus A320-200 in the old livery

EasyJet UK flies to over 40 countries and over 60 airports.

This list includes the parent company's and its subsidiaries' destinations.

EasyJet UK destinations (as of November 2020)
Country or territory	Airport count
Albania	1
Austria	5
Belgium	1
Bulgaria	3
Croatia	4
Cyprus	2
Czech Republic	1
Denmark	2
Egypt	3
Estonia	1
Finland	3
France	19
Germany	11
Gibraltar	1
Greece	14
Hungary	1
Iceland	1
Isle of Man	1
Israel	1
Italy	19
Jersey	1
Jordan	1
Kosovo	1
Luxembourg	1
Malta	1
Montenegro	1
Morocco	4
Netherlands	1
North Macedonia	1
Norway	1
Poland	1
Portugal	5
Romania	1
Russia	1
Serbia	1
Slovenia	1
Spain	22
Sweden	3
Switzerland	3
Switzerland/France/Germany (EuroAirport Basel-Mulhouse-Freiburg is geographically located in France, but partially administered by Switzerland. Germany is considered a key market and therefore direct destination due to its strategic location)	1
Tunisia	1
Turkey	5
United Kingdom	20

== Fleet ==
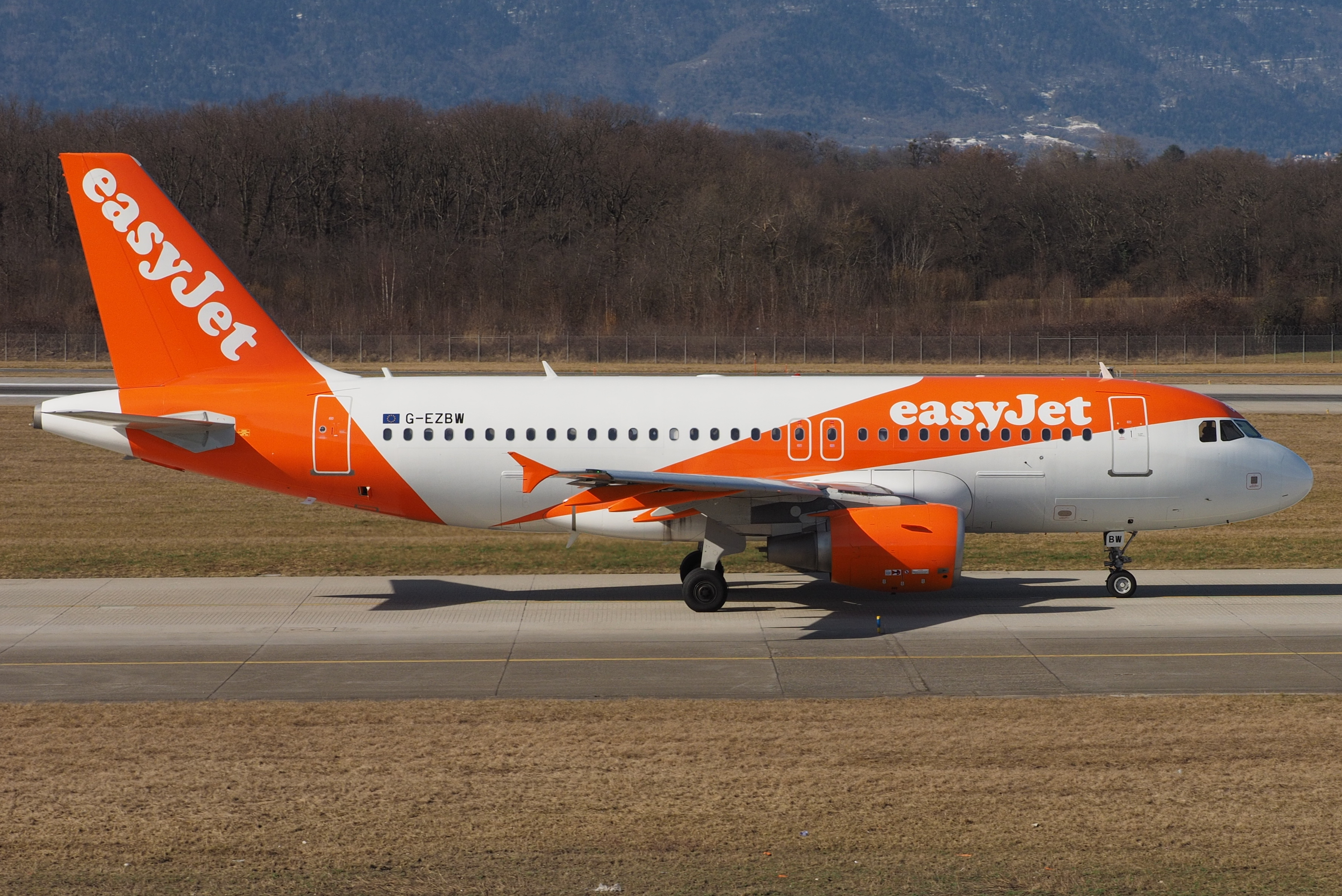
An EasyJet Airbus A319-100

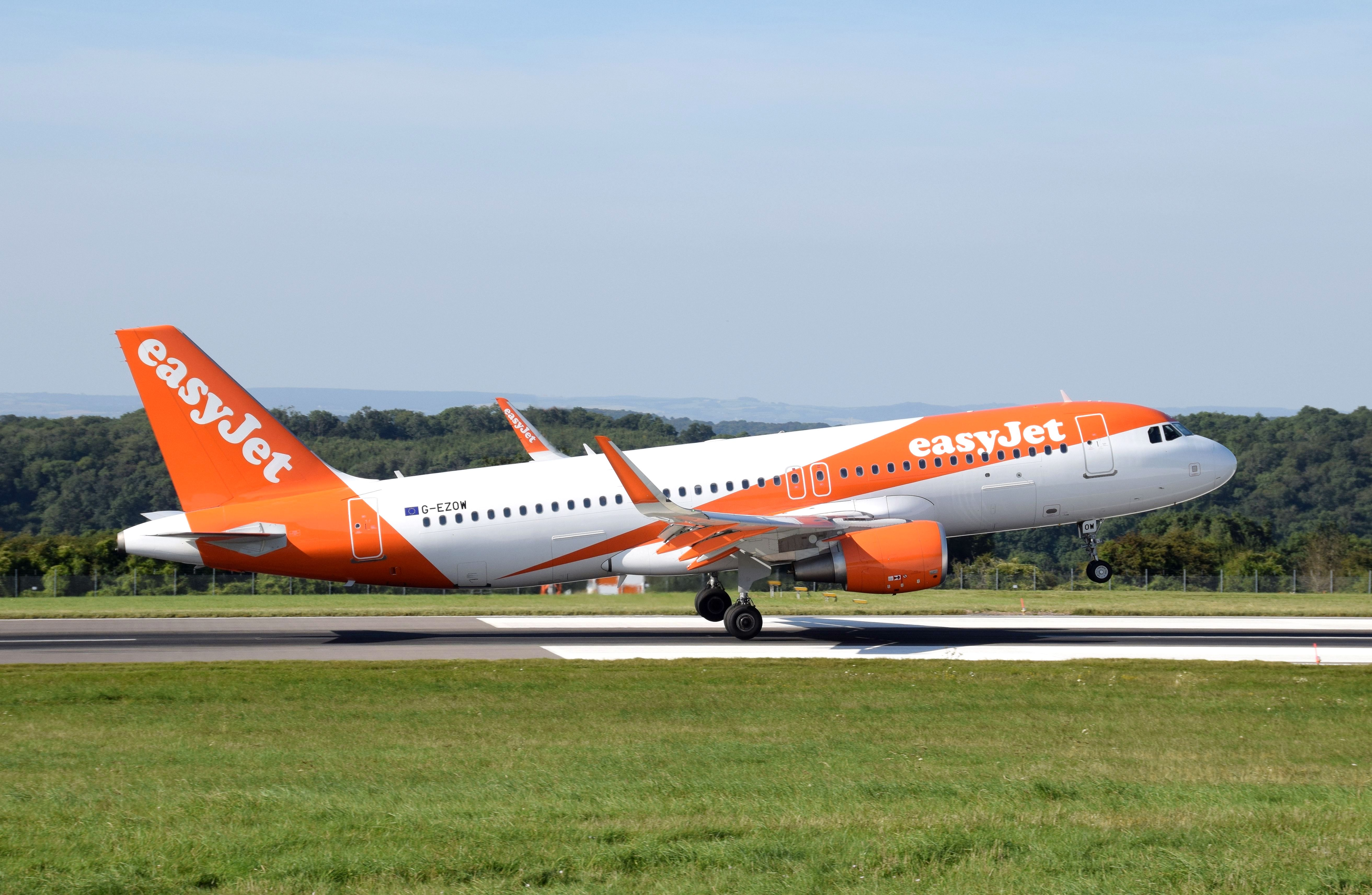
An EasyJet Airbus A320-200

As of April 2025, EasyJet UK operates the following aircraft:

EasyJet UK fleet
Aircraft	In service	Orders	Passengers	Notes
Airbus A319-100	47	—	156	Older aircraft to be retired and replaced by Airbus A320neo.
Airbus A320-200	82	—	180	
Airbus A320-200	82	—	186	
Airbus A320neo	50	—	186	Deliveries deferred until after 2021.
Airbus A321neo	11	—	235	Airbus Cabin Flex (ACF) configuration.
Total	190	—		
