= EasyJet =

British multinational low-cost airline group

EasyJet plc

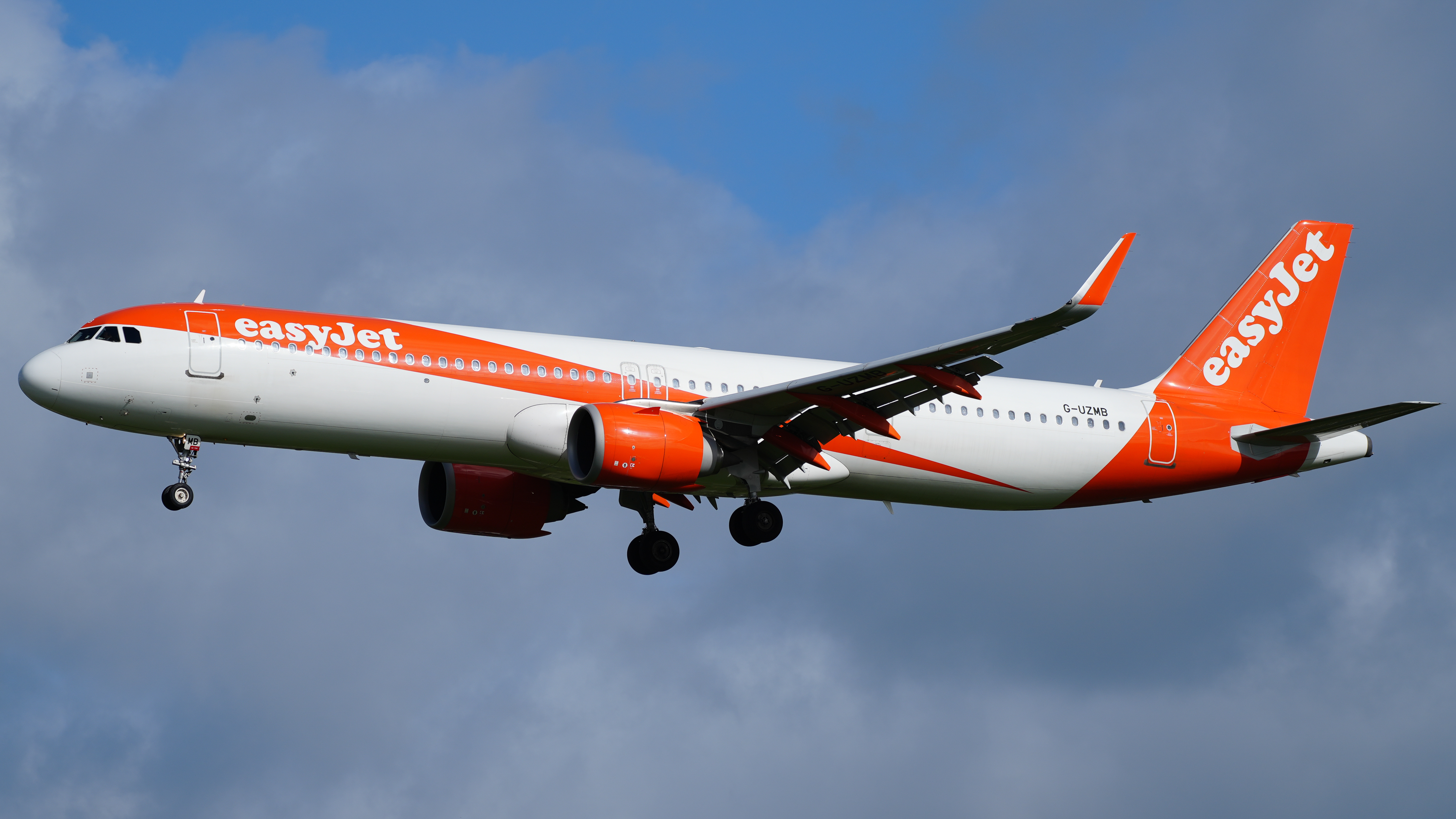
- An easyJet Airbus A321neo
IATA	ICAO	Call sign
U2	EZY	EASY
- Founded: 1995; 31 years ago
- Operating bases: List of bases: Alicante (seasonal); Amsterdam; Barcelona; Basel/Mulhouse; Belfast–International; Berlin Brandenburg; Birmingham; Bordeaux; Bristol; Edinburgh; Faro (seasonal); Geneva; Glasgow; Lisbon; Liverpool; London–Gatwick; London–Luton; London—Southend; Lyon; Málaga (seasonal); Manchester; Marrakesh; Milan–Malpensa; Milan–Linate; Nantes; Naples; Newcastle Upon Tyne; Nice; Palma de Mallorca (seasonal); Paris–Charles de Gaulle; Paris–Orly; Porto; Rome–Fiumicino
- Frequent-flyer program: easyJet Plus
- Subsidiaries: EasyJet UK; EasyJet Europe; EasyJet Switzerland (40%); EasyJet Holidays
- Fleet size: 356
- Destinations: 163
- Traded as: LSE: EZJ; FTSE 100 component
- Headquarters: Luton Airport, Luton, England
- Key people: Sir Stephen Hester (non-executive chairman); Kenton Jarvis (CEO)
- Founder: Sir Stelios Haji-Ioannou
- Revenue: ▲£10,106 million (2025)
- Operating income: ▲£703 million (2025)
- Net income: ▲£494 million (2025)
- Employees: ▲18,968 (2025)
- Website: easyjet.com

EasyJet plc is a British low-cost airline and package holiday multinational group headquartered at Luton Airport. It operates domestic and international scheduled services on 927 routes in more than 34 countries via its affiliate airlines EasyJet UK, EasyJet Switzerland and EasyJet Europe. It also operates as a package holiday provider to more than 100 destinations across Europe and North Africa through its subsidiary EasyJet Holidays Limited. The company employs around 13,000 people, based throughout Europe but mainly in the UK. EasyJet plc is listed on the London Stock Exchange and is a constituent of the FTSE 100 Index.

Since its establishment in 1995, EasyJet has expanded through a combination of acquisitions, and base openings, driven by consumer demand for low-cost air travel. The group, along with associate companies EasyJet UK, EasyJet Europe and EasyJet Switzerland, operates 321 aircraft. It has 29 bases across Europe, with the largest being London Gatwick Airport. In 2022, the airline carried more than 69.7 million passengers, making it the second largest budget airline in Europe by number of passengers carried, only behind Ryanair.

== History ==
=== Origins and formation ===
EasyJet has its roots in the business activity of Greek-Cypriot Stelios Haji-Ioannou, who reportedly gained an interest in the aviation business after being approached as a potential investor in Virgin Atlantic's Greek franchisee. Recognising a vacant niche in the market, Stelios decided to examine the prospects for launching his airline, having secured a commitment of a £5 million loan from his father. While studying various business models in the industry, Stelios took a significant interest in the American operator Southwest Airlines, which had successfully adopted the practice of price elasticity to be competitive with traditionally cheaper buses and attract customers that would not normally have considered air travel. This principle became a cornerstone of EasyJet's operations.

In 1995, EasyJet was established by Stelios, being the first company in what would later become the EasyGroup conglomerate. Upon launch, it employed just 70 people; the company is based at London Luton Airport, which was traditionally used only by charter flights. To encourage the company, Luton Airport chose to give EasyJet free use of a 15,000-square-foot (1,400-square-metre) building for its headquarters, which it named EasyLand; its management style typified minimal overhead, such as an early implementation of the paperless office concept. EasyJet initially operated a pair of wet leased Boeing 737-200 aircraft, capable of seating 130 passengers. These were flown on two routes: Luton to Glasgow International Airport and Edinburgh Airport. Early on, EasyJet operated as a paper airline, the aircraft themselves being flown and maintained under a lease.

Early promotional activity focused on the airline's relatively low pricing compared to incumbent operators. Within its first year, EasyJet reportedly carried approximately 40,000 passengers.

In April 1996, the first wholly owned aircraft was delivered to EasyJet, enabling the company's first international route, to Amsterdam, which was operated in direct competition with rival airlines British Airways (BA) and Dutch flag carrier KLM. Competitors responded to the emerging EasyJet in different ways; while BA was largely indifferent, KLM allegedly chose to respond with a predatory pricing strategy that led to an investigation by the European Union over unfair competitive practices. Despite commercial pressure from the emergent no-frills sector, traditional airlines have been unable to directly adopt similar practices to EasyJet due to vigorous protection of existing employee privileges by unions.

EasyJet's aircraft were initially operated by GB Airways from November 1995 until July 1996 and subsequently by Air Foyle HeavyLift until October 1997, as EasyJet had not yet received its air operator's Certificate.

=== Flotation ===
On 5 November 2000, EasyJet was floated on the London Stock Exchange. In October 2004, the FL Group (now named Stodir), owner of the Icelandair and Sterling Airlines airlines, purchased an 8.4% stake in the airline. Over the course of 2005, FL increased its share in the company periodically to 16.9%, fuelling speculation that it would mount a takeover bid for the UK carrier. However, in April 2006, the threat of takeover receded as FL sold its stake for €325 million, securing a profit of €140 million on its investment.

In March 2013, EasyJet was promoted to the FTSE 100; during the same month, the company launched its 100th route from London Gatwick Airport, offering flights directly from London to Moscow. By 2015, the company was flying routes to more than 130 destinations in 31 countries, operated 26 bases centred around Europe, and had a total of 10,000 employees.

=== Expansion and acquisitions ===
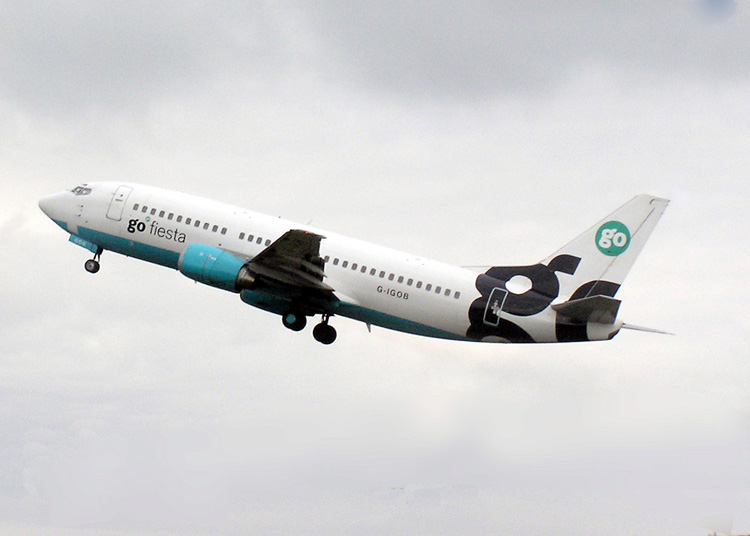
Go Fly Boeing 737-300 in 2004

In March 1998, EasyJet purchased a 40% stake in Swiss charter airline TEA Basle for 3 million Swiss francs. The airline was renamed EasyJet Switzerland and commenced franchise services on 1 April 1999, having relocated its headquarters to Geneva Airport. Geneva was EasyJet's first new base outside the United Kingdom.

In 2002, rival airline Go Fly was purchased for £374 million; EasyJet inherited three new bases from Go, at Bristol Airport, East Midlands Airport and London Stansted Airport. The acquisition of Go almost doubled the number of Boeing 737-300 aircraft in the EasyJet fleet. In 2002, the airline opened its base at Gatwick Airport. Between 2003 and 2007, it opened additional bases in Germany, France, Italy, and Spain, establishing a presence in continental Europe. By 2007, EasyJet was claiming to be operating more flights per day than any other European airline.

On 25 October 2007, EasyJet purchased the entire share capital of GB Airways from the Bland Group. This acquisition was valued at £103.5 million, and was used by the airline to expand its operations at Gatwick, and to establish a base at Manchester Airport.

In June 2011, the airline opened its eleventh British base – at London Southend Airport, offering flights to Alicante, Amsterdam, Barcelona, Belfast, Faro, Málaga, Jersey, Palma de Mallorca and Ibiza. In July 2017, EasyJet announced it would open a new European headquarters in Austria to enable it to operate after Brexit.

On 28 October 2017, EasyJet announced it would lease 25 former Air Berlin A320 aircraft to operate across EasyJet Europe's network, under its European AOC. Several of these aircraft were based at Berlin-Tegel Airport, before its closure. These aircraft have subsequently been transferred to Berlin-Brandenburg Airport. Previously EasyJet had only operated from Berlin-Schönefeld Airport and Berlin-Tegel Airport, where EasyJet had taken over some of Air Berlin's old services.

On 30 March 2020, EasyJet suspended all flights, grounded its entire fleet, and furloughed its crews due to travel restrictions imposed in response to the COVID-19 pandemic. This came after the company had flown 650 "rescue flights", taking 45,000 people back home. In April 2020, EasyJet secured a £600 million loan from the UK Government. In June 2020, EasyJet announced its intention to resume flights, flying half of its routes in July 2020 and up to 75 per cent in August 2020, though with reduced frequency.

In April 2020, EasyJet became involved in a dispute with its owner and largest shareholder, Stelios Haji-Ioannou. Haji-Ioannou criticised the airline's decision not to seek to cancel the outstanding Airbus order, claiming it would create an additional £4.5 billion of capital which the airline could not afford to spend. He threatened to call a general meeting to remove a director every three weeks unless subsequent action was taken. A general meeting was held on 22 May, where shareholders ultimately voted over 99% in favour of the EasyJet board and retaining the Airbus contract.

On 19 May 2020, the company revealed that it had been the subject of a cyber-attack resulting in the release of the personal information of 9 million customers. On 10 September 2021, the company claimed it had rejected a takeover bid from rival Wizz Air. On 30 September 2021, Stelios Haji-Ioannou and his family lost control of the company, after failing to take up the rights issue and being diluted. Their stake was reduced from 25.3% to 15.27% as of 30 September 2021.

=== Proposed takeover by Apollo ===
On 1 June 2026, amid rising jet fuel prices contributed by the 2026 Iran war, it was reported that the US investment firm Castlelake was considering a takeover of the airline. Castlelake had until 26 June to make a firm offer or withdraw from the acquisition. On 4 June it was reported that Castlelake was considering shipping company MSC Group as a partner in a consortium for the takeover.

On 6 July 2026, it was reported that EasyJet had agreed in principle to a £5.5 billion takeover bid from Castlelake. On 10 July it was announced that EasyJet had accepted an alternate proposal from Apollo Global Management, valuing the business at approximately £5.7 billion, or 715p per share — an 81% premium to the closing share price on 28 May 2026, the day before Castlelake's interest was first made public. The EasyJet board said it was "no longer minded to recommend" Castlelake's proposal in light of Apollo's higher offer.

On 3 August 2026, EasyJet requested that the UK Panel on Takeovers and Mergers align the "put up or shut up" deadlines for both bidders to 5:00pm on 7 August 2026, by which point each firm was required under Rule 2.6 of the City Code on Takeovers and Mergers to either announce a firm intention to make an offer or confirm it did not intend to bid.

On 6 August 2026, Castlelake announced under Rule 2.8 of the Code that it did not intend to make an offer for EasyJet, ending its pursuit of the airline. The statement restricts Castlelake, and parties acting in concert with it, from making a new offer for six months, except in limited circumstances such as agreement from the EasyJet board or a competing bid.

Later that day, Apollo announced a firm intention to make an offer under Rule 2.7 of the Code, ahead of its 7 August deadline. The offer is being made through Eagle Bidco Ltd, a company indirectly owned by Apollo funds, and is structured as a recommended cash acquisition to be implemented by means of a scheme of arrangement under Part 26 of the Companies Act 2006. The cash offer values EasyJet's entire issued and to-be-issued ordinary share capital at approximately £5.7 billion, representing a premium of 81% to the closing share price on the last undisturbed trading day and 22% to the highest closing price in the previous four years. Shareholders were also offered the option to elect for an alternative "rollover" structure, receiving one share in an indirect parent undertaking of Bidco for each easyJet share held, in place of cash.

The EasyJet board unanimously recommended the offer to shareholders. The transaction remains subject to customary conditions, including regulatory approvals, and is expected to complete by the end of the first calendar quarter of 2027.

== Senior leadership ==
- Chairman: Sir Stephen Hester (since December 2021)
- Chief executive: Kenton Jarvis (since January 2025)
- Chief financial officer: Jan De Raeymaeker (since October 2024)

=== Former chairmen ===
1. Sir Stelios Haji-Ioannou (1995–2002)
2. Sir Colin Chandler (2003–2009)
3. Sir Michael Rake (2010–2013)
4. John Barton (2013–2021)

=== Former chief executives ===
1. Ray Webster (1996–2005)
2. Andy Harrison (2005–2010)
3. Carolyn McCall (2010–2017)
4. Johan Lundgren (2017–2024)

== Corporate affairs ==
=== Business strategy ===
EasyJet, like Ryanair, uses a business model pioneered by Southwest Airlines. Both airlines have adapted this model for the European market through further cost-cutting measures, such as not selling connecting flights or providing complimentary snacks on board. The key points of this business model are high aircraft utilisation, quick turnaround times, charging for extras (such as priority boarding, holding baggage, and food) and keeping operating costs low.

Initially, EasyJet's employment strategy was to maintain control with minimal union involvement. During the 2000s, the airline adopted a different approach, deciding to make accommodations for unions.

Originally, EasyJet did not allocate seats so passengers took any available seats, with the option to pay for "Speedy Boarding", which allowed them to be first onto the aircraft. Since 2012, all passengers are allocated numbered seats before boarding commences, as it was found that this does not slow down boarding times and could earn more revenue than Speedy Boarding. Passengers can receive randomly allocated seats for no charge or pay an additional fee to select specific seats. More desirable seats, such as the front few rows and overwing exit row seats (which have extra legroom) cost more to reserve than other seats.

=== Business trends ===
Between the start of the COVID-19 pandemic and August 2020, EasyJet raised over £2.4 billion in new finance. Out of the sum, £600 million came from the Covid Corporate Financing Facility provided by the UK government and over £400 million was raised from the placement of shares. In November 2020, EasyJet announced that, due to the pandemic and the lockdowns in many countries, it would scale back its reduced flying schedule to no more than 20 per cent of capacity. It also announced its first annual loss during the 25-year history of the company.

The key trends for the EasyJet Group are (as of the financial year ending 30 September):

	Turnover (£m)	Net profit/loss (£m)	Number of employees	Number of passengers (m)	Load factor (%)	Fleet size	References
2004	1,091	41.1	3,656	24.3	84.5	92	
2005	1,314	42.6	3,875	29.6	85.2	109	
2006	1,620	94.1	4,359	33.0	84.8	122	
2007	1,797	152	5,493	37.2	83.7	137	
2008	2,363	83.2	6,375	43.7	84.1	165	
2009	2,667	71.2	6,478	45.2	85.5	181	
2010	2,973	121	6,887	48.8	87.0	196	
2011	3,452	225	8,288	54.5	87.3	204	
2012	3,854	255	8,446	58.4	88.7	214	
2013	4,258	398	8,945	60.8	89.3	217	
2014	4,527	450	9,649	64.8	90.6	226	
2015	4,686	548	10,388	68.6	91.5	241	
2016	4,669	427	10,774	73.1	91.6	257	
2017	5,047	325	12,280	80.2	92.6	279	
2018	5,898	466	14,245	88.5	92.9	315	
2019	6,385	349	15,518	96.1	91.5	331	
2020	3,009	−1,079	14,292	48.1	87.2	342	
2021	1,458	−858	13,632	20.4	72.5	308	
2022	5,769	−169	14,443	69.7	85.5	320	
2023	8,171	324	16,697	82.8	89.3	336	
2024	9,309	452	17,639	89.7	89.3	347	
2025	10,106	494	18,968	93.4	89.8	356	

=== Head office ===
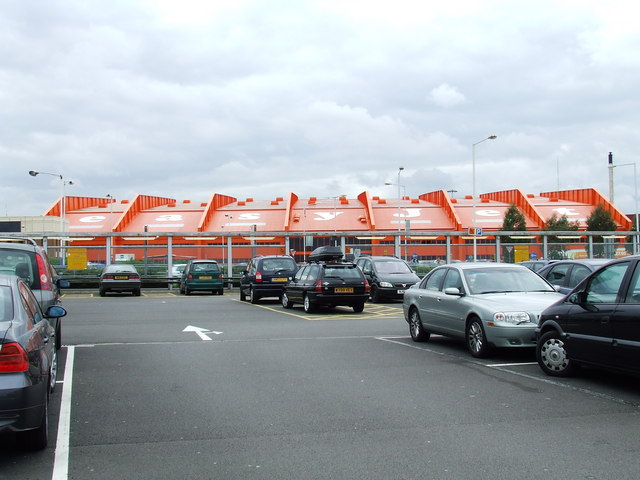
Hangar 89 at London Luton Airport, EasyJet's head office

EasyJet's head office is Hangar 89 (H89), a building located on the grounds of London Luton Airport in Luton, Bedfordshire; the hangar is located 150 metres (490 ft) from EasyLand, the previous headquarters of the airline. Hangar 89, built in 1974, has 30,000 square feet (2,800 m^{2}) of office space and can house three aircraft the size of an Airbus A319 at one time. When EasyJet received H89, it had a 1970s-style office setup. The airline modernised the building and painted it orange.

=== Marketing ===
EasyJet's early marketing slogan was "making flying as affordable as a pair of jeans". It urged travellers to cut out the travel agent. Its original advertising consisted of little more than the airline's telephone booking number painted in bright orange on the side of its aircraft. The specific colour that EasyJet uses closely resembles that of the telecommunications corporation Orange and was a subject of dispute between the two companies in 2004 when EasyGroup launched a mobile phone subsidiary, easyMobile.

The airline has used a number of slogans since its establishment. In 1996, they used the slogan "This is Generation easyJet". Other slogans included "The Web's Favourite Airline", "Come on, let's fly" and "To Fly, To Save" (a parody of British Airways' slogan "To Fly, To Serve"). This was then followed by "[....] by easyJet", with "Europe by easyJet" and "business by easyJet" being the most widely used. In 2025, EasyJet reused "Get Out There", accompanied by the Adriano Celentano track, "Prisencolinensinainciusol".

The television series Airline, broadcast on ITV and created by LWT (1998–2007), followed the airline's operations at London Luton and later at other bases. The series, while not always portraying the airline in a positive light, made EasyJet a household name in the United Kingdom and did much to promote it during this time. Later, its pilot training scheme was the subject of another ITV television series, EasyJet: Inside the Cockpit, which premiered in August 2017.

In 2003, EasyJet was reprimanded by the Advertising Standards Authority (ASA) following a complaint by rival operator Ryanair. EasyJet had run a press campaign claiming that business travelers chose its flights for their "excellent on-time performance". While the ASA acknowledged that EasyJet's punctuality was better than that of other scheduled airlines on specific routes, the watchdog ruled that their overall record of delays and cancellations was not good enough to justify the use of the word "excellent" and ordered the airline to withdraw the advertisement.

=== Environment ===
In June 2007, EasyJet announced plans for the construction of its airliner, dubbed EcoJet. It was claimed to possess improved fuel efficiency over contemporary airliners. To achieve this, the EcoJet was described as using propfan engines, as well as being constructed with extensive use of carbon fibre composite material. At the time of the announcement, it was stated that the first flight was scheduled to occur sometime during 2015. Speaking at the time, EasyJet chief executive Andy Harrison commented that: "We have not developed a new concept. We have taken ideas from Boeing, Airbus and the engine manufacturers and put them together." Harrison claimed that the EcoJet, combined with other improvements in the industry, would enable a 50% reduction in greenhouse gas emissions within eight years. However, there have been few announcements on the project since then. EasyJet then campaigned for the UK to replace air passenger duty (APD) with a new tax that would vary depending on distance travelled and aircraft type.

In July 2008, the United Kingdom Advertising Standards Authority (ASA) criticised a press campaign by the airline, over a misleading environmental claim that its aircraft released 22% fewer emissions than rival airlines. The figures used were not based on emissions produced by an EasyJet aircraft or emissions produced by the airline overall as the advertisement implied, and ASA declared that the airline had broken advertising rules. The judgement that followed reprimanded the airline in April 2007 after it made comments that its aircraft created 30% less pollution per passenger than some of its rivals.

In February 2011, the airline painted eight of its aircraft with a lightweight, thin "revolutionary nanotechnology coating" polymer. It works by reducing the build-up of debris and reduces drag across the surface of the aircraft, thus reducing the fuel bill. It was estimated the airline could save 1–2% annually, equating to a £14 million reduction in fuel costs. The coating has already been used on US military aircraft and if successful EasyJet would apply the paint to its whole fleet. In late 2015, EasyJet started making use of artificial intelligence (AI) and big data for the purpose of improving efficiency, cutting costs, and enhancing the customer experience.

On 27 September 2017, EasyJet announced its partnership with an American start-up company Wright Electric with the purpose of developing and introducing a short-haul 120-seat all-electric airline. The propulsion system is said to comprise a series of eight electrically driven ducted fans that are buried in the wings, which are powered by numerous battery packs distributed underneath the cabin floor; it is claimed to possess a range of roughly 335 miles, suitable for about one-fifth of EasyJet's current city routes, and facilitate zero-emission flights, as well as being 50% quieter and 10% less expensive to operate than conventional jet airliners. At the time, EasyJet stated that it intended to introduce electric aircraft into revenue service within 10 years. In October 2018, EasyJet stated that progress was being made on its electric ambitions and that the partnerships planned to test a nine-seater electric plane as early as 2019.

Since November 2019, EasyJet has offset the carbon emissions from all of its flights using carbon offsetting projects that meet either the Gold Standard or Verified Carbon Standard (VCS) accreditation. As a result, it is the first major airline in the world to operate net-carbon-zero flights across its entire network. The airline describes this as an "interim" measure whilst the next generation of aircraft propulsion is developed. Consequently, EasyJet announced a partnership with Airbus on a joint research project into zero-emission hydrogen aircraft.

=== Customer issues ===
EasyJet has been criticised in Germany for not observing European Union law on compensation (and assistance to passengers) in cases of denied boarding, delays or cancellations (Regulation 261/2004). When flights are cancelled, passengers are supposed to be reimbursed within one week. In 2006, the airline did not always refund tickets in a timely fashion. Passengers occasionally had to wait longer for reimbursement of their expenses.

In July 2011, the airline tried to refuse the carriage of a boy with muscular dystrophy because he had an electric wheelchair. In separate incidents in 2012, paralympians received similar treatment, and a French court found the airline guilty of three counts of disability discrimination.

In January 2017, the company was fined €60,000 by another French court because it had refused to allow a disabled passenger to the board in 2010; the company cited security concerns and internal regulations but said it would not appeal against the ruling. In September 2013, a passenger who sent a tweet complaining about the airline after his flight was delayed said he was initially told he would not be allowed to board the aircraft because of the posting. On 27 August 2020, the airline was sued by a woman over discriminatory concerns. The woman had been asked to switch seats twice in a row, to accommodate two ultra-Orthodox Jewish men. On 18 August 2023, a blind couple stated the airline "refused" to assist them with booking tickets after a missed previous flight, stating they must book online and "told [them] they couldn't help us". The airline offered an apology and Swissport and ABM who provided passenger assistance service on behalf of the airline that day said they are both "looking into this".

=== European AOC ===
Following the UK's referendum vote to leave the European Union, EasyJet announced a plan to establish an Air Operator Certificate (AOC) in another EU member state. This will secure the flying rights of the 30% of EasyJet's network that remains wholly within and between EU states, excluding the UK. EasyJet expected a one-off cost of around £10 million over two years with up to £5 million incurred in the 2017 financial year. The primary driver of the cost is the re-registering of aircraft in an EU AOC jurisdiction.

In July 2017, EasyJet announced that it has applied for, and was subsequently granted by the Ministry of Transport, an Austrian Air Operator Certificate (AOC) and operating permit, thereby establishing EasyJet Europe. The new airline is headquartered in Vienna, allowing EasyJet to continue operating flights across and within European countries following the UK's withdrawal from the EU. The first aircraft, an Airbus A320, was re-registered as OE-IVA.

EasyJet announced that the transition would result in no job losses in the UK, as the staff to be employed by EasyJet Europe are already based in the EU27. EasyJet UK staff would continue to be based in Luton. The group will thus comprise three airlines, EasyJet UK, EasyJet Europe, and EasyJet Switzerland, all of which are owned by EasyJet plc, which is itself EU owned and controlled, listed on the London Stock Exchange, and based in the UK. In May 2018, EasyJet confirmed that it was very close to achieving the required majority EU27 share ownership and that the UK government will nevertheless continue to consider it as a UK airline.

== Destinations ==
Countries in which EasyJet operates as of March 2026

As of January 2024, EasyJet serves 183 destinations.

Top airports by destinations in 2025 (with more than 20 destinations)
Airport	IATA	Destinations
London–Gatwick	LGW	114
Manchester	MAN	93
Geneva	GVA	92
Bristol	BRS	82
London–Luton	LTN	75
Basel/Mulhouse/Freiburg	BSL	75
Milan–Malpensa	MXP	73
Berlin Brandenburg	BER	60
Lyon	LYS	56
Amsterdam	AMS	54
Naples	NAP	53
Edinburgh	EDI	52
Nice	NCE	51
Paris–Charles de Gaulle	CDG	50
Belfast–International	BFS	44
Birmingham	BHX	39
Bordeaux	BOD	38
Glasgow	GLA	37
Palma de Mallorca	PMI	36
Liverpool	LPL	34
Nantes	NTE	33
Lisbon	LIS	31
Porto	OPO	28
Paris–Orly	ORY	27
Alicante	ALC	24
Málaga	AGP	24
Marrakech	RAK	24
Barcelona	BCN	22
Milan–Linate	LIN	21
Prague	PRG	21
Tenerife	TFS	21
Lanzarote	ACE	20

== Codeshare agreements ==
In 2013, EasyJet entered a commercial agreement with Transaero to set up a codeshare agreement, whereby Transaero acquired the right to sell a certain number of seats on EasyJet's Moscow (Domodedovo) – London (Gatwick) route. This was the first codeshare agreement for EasyJet; it was terminated when Transaero Airlines ceased to operate in October 2015. Citing diminishing demand on the route, EasyJet ceased all flights to Moscow in March 2016.

EasyJet has a reward miles sharing agreement with Emirates.

=== Interline agreements and other airline partners ===
Easyjet also has Interline agreements and partnership with the following airlines:

- Aegean Airlines
- Corsair International
- Etihad Airways
- Icelandair
- La Compagnie
- Neos
- Norse Atlantic Airways
- Sky Express
- Virgin Atlantic
- WestJet

== Incidents ==
- On 15 September 2006, EasyJet Flight 6074, an Airbus A319-111, registered as G-EZAC, suffered a major electrical failure, rendering the radio, autopilot, TCAS, and electronic flight instrument system inoperable, among other critical systems. This nearly caused a mid-air collision with another aircraft, an American Airlines Boeing 777, which diverted from its collision course with fewer than 30 seconds to spare. The A319's pilots continued their flight straight to Bristol out of fear of being shot down, since the failure knocked out their transponder. This made it impossible for the aircraft to be tracked by air traffic control, which potentially would have forced the assumption that it had been hijacked were it to deviate from its initially approved flight path without clearance.

== Fleet ==
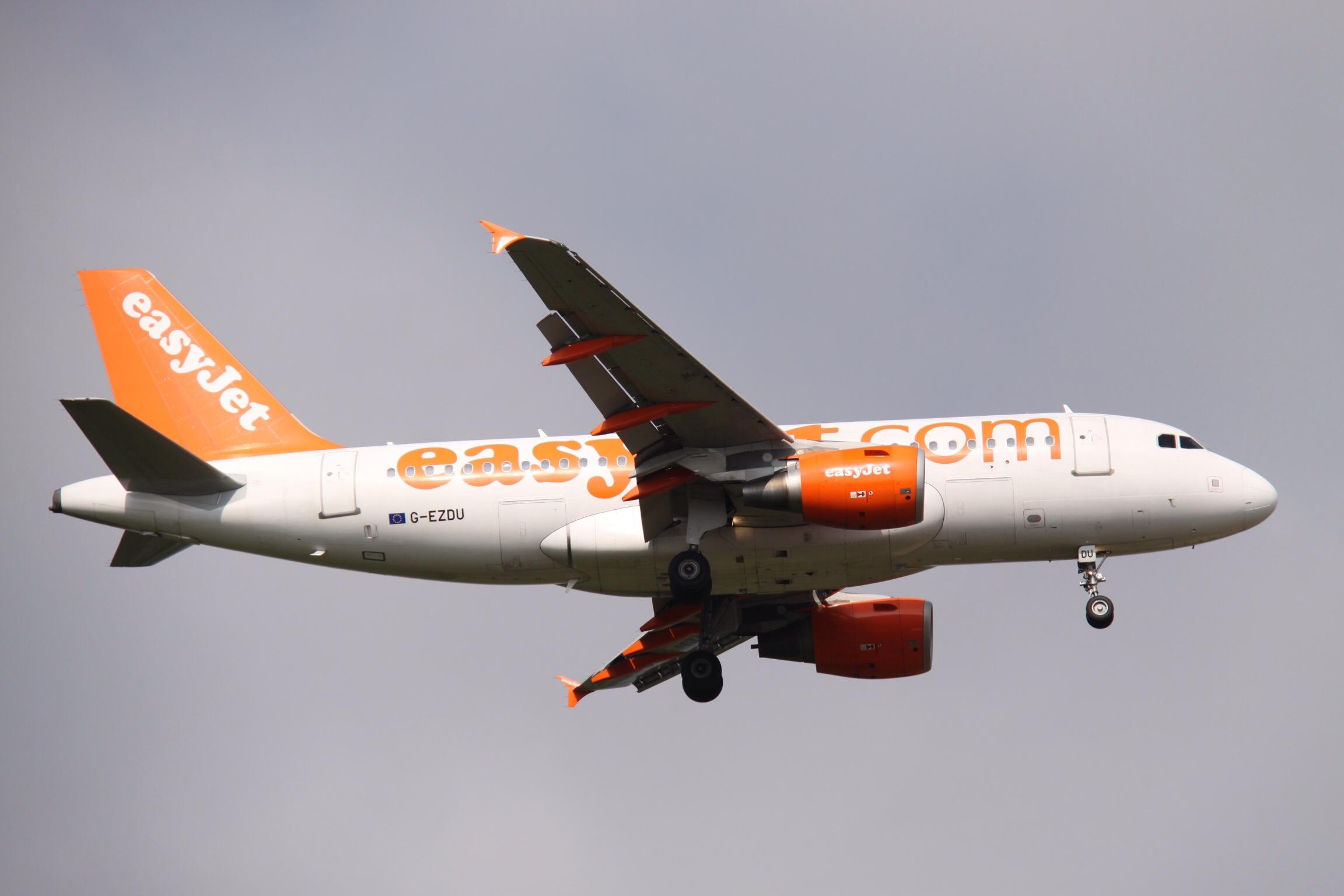
EasyJet Airbus A319-100 wearing the former livery

EasyJet Airbus A320neo

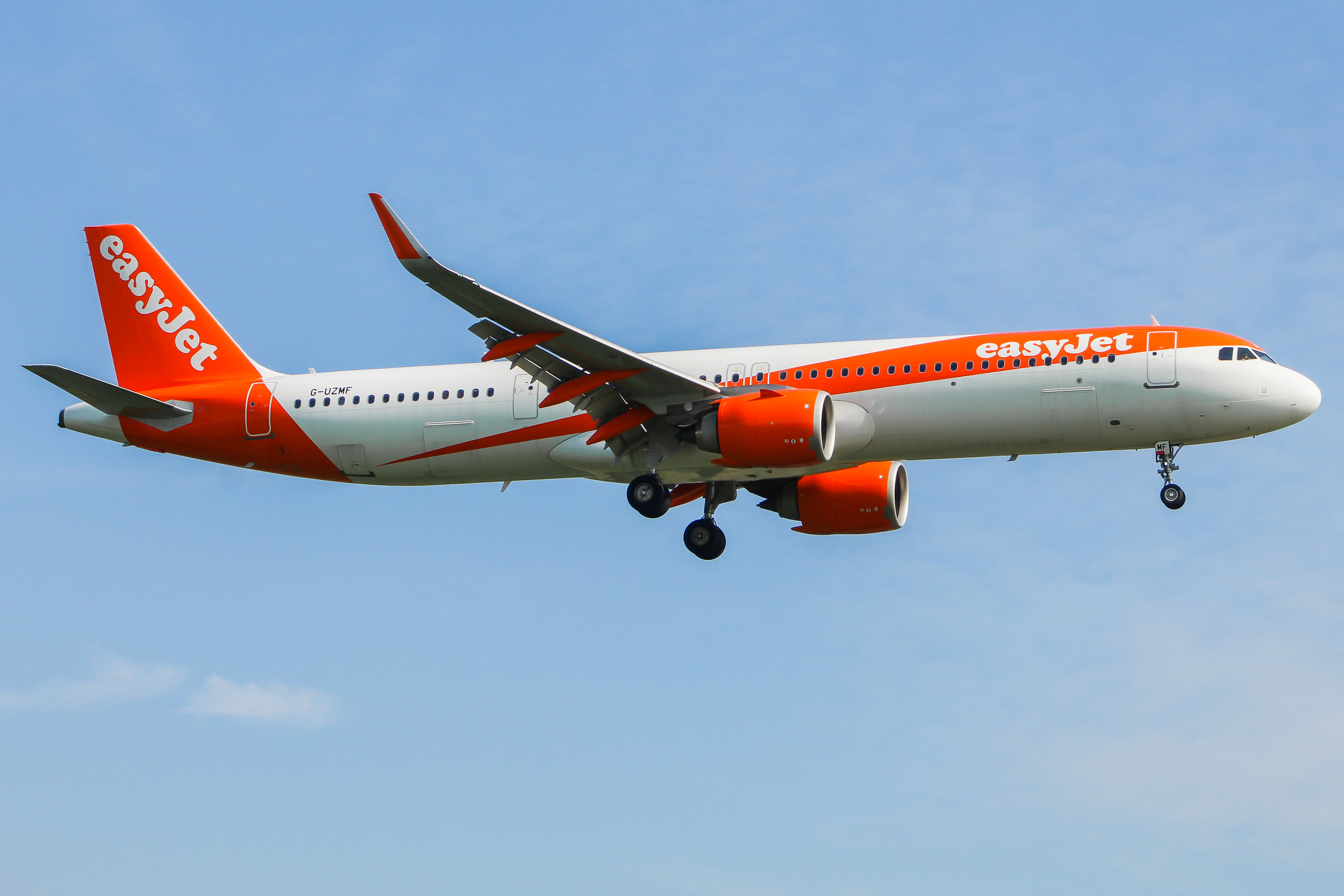
EasyJet Airbus A321neo

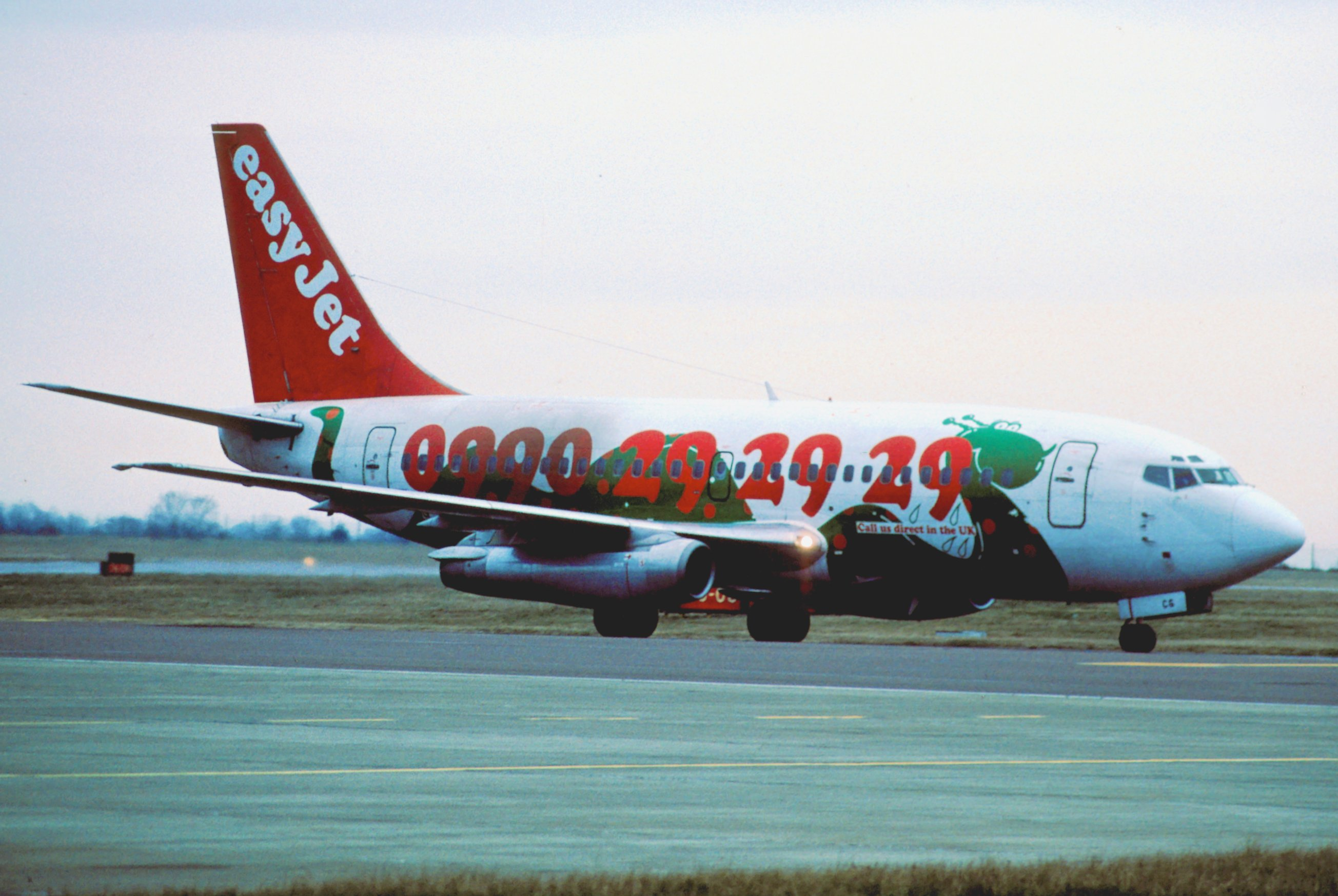
A former EasyJet Boeing 737-200 in 1997

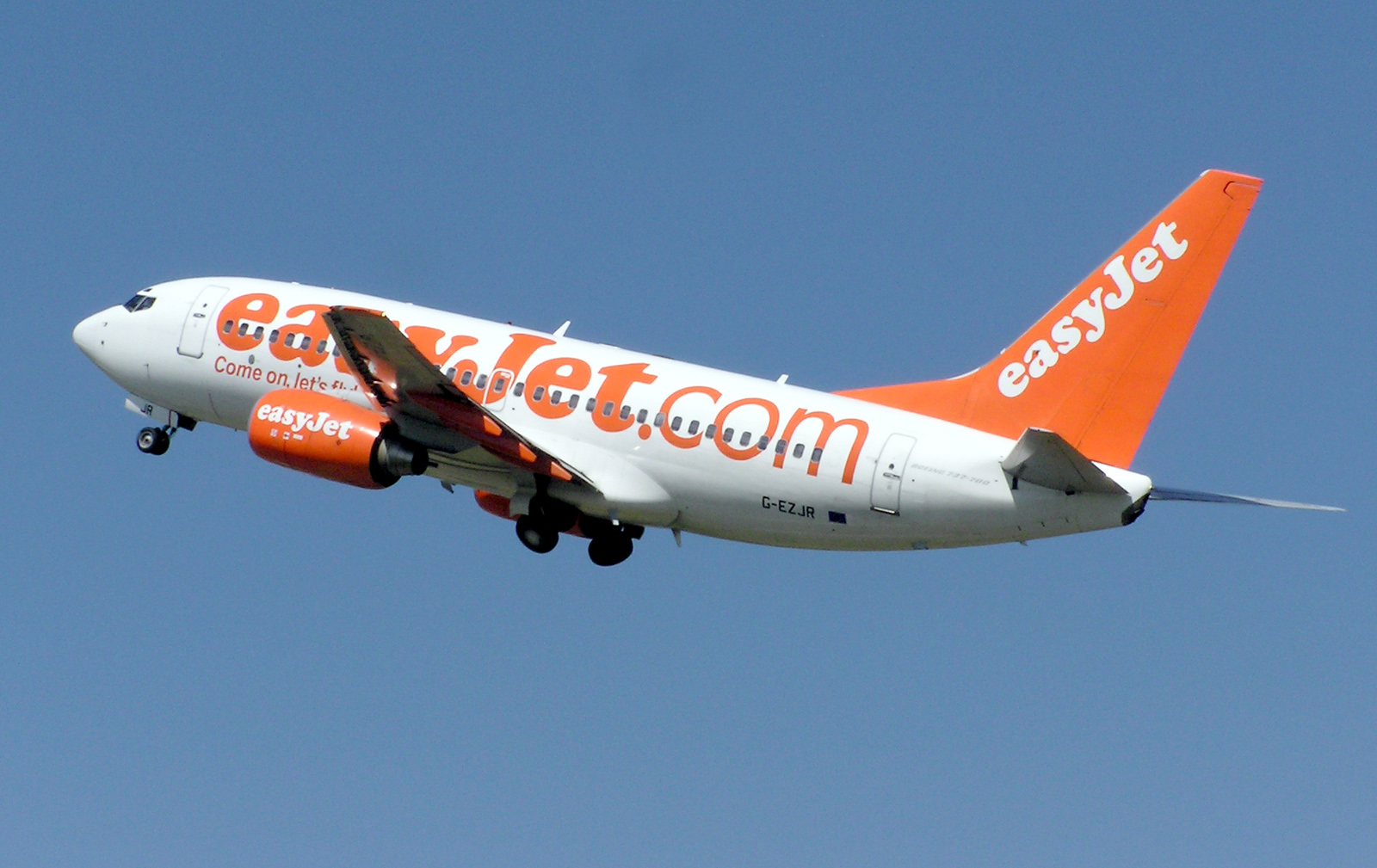
A former EasyJet Boeing 737-700 in 2005

=== Current fleet ===
EasyJet plc's fleet consists entirely of Airbus A320 family aircraft. Among them, 208 are wholly owned and 148 are leased. As of March 2026, the group operates the following aircraft:

EasyJet fleet
Aircraft	In service	Orders	Passengers	Notes
Airbus A319-100	82	—	156	To be retired by 2027 and replaced by Airbus A320neo.
Airbus A320-200	25	—	180	Largest operator.
Airbus A320-200	155	—	186	Largest operator.
Airbus A320neo	72	125	186	To replace Airbus A319-100.
Airbus A320neo	3	125	188	To replace Airbus A319-100.
Airbus A321neo	21	165	235	Airbus Cabin Flex (ACF) configuration.
Total	356	290		

=== Fleet strategy and aircraft orders ===
In common with other low-cost carriers, EasyJet has a strategy of operating just one aircraft type. Initially, it used Boeing 737 aircraft exclusively, but in October 2002, it ordered 120 Airbus A319 aircraft, plus 120 options. Since then, all orders have been from the Airbus A320 family, and the Boeing aircraft have been phased out. With the acquisition of GB Airways in 2007, EasyJet inherited nine Airbus A320 and six Airbus A321 aircraft. This gave the airline some time to evaluate the feasibility of operating these larger aircraft. Based on this evaluation, EasyJet exchanged 25 A319 orders for A320s in July 2008 and later removed the A321 aircraft from the fleet.

On 18 June 2013, the airline announced an intention to acquire – subject to shareholder approval – 35 Airbus A320 aircraft, for delivery between 2015 and 2017, and 100 Airbus A320neo aircraft for delivery between 2017 and 2022. As part of the agreement, the airline will have purchase rights on a further 100 A320neo aircraft. The current generation A320s and fifty of the A320neos will replace the current A319 aircraft.

On 15 May 2017, EasyJet announced the conversion of 30 A320neo orders into A321neo aircraft to be used on busier routes. The then-CEO of EasyJet, Carolyn McCall, stated of the change: "bigger planes would help easyJet increase capacity in slot-constrained airports at peak times, such as Geneva, Amsterdam and London Gatwick". She added that the A321neos would help to cut costs by 9 per cent. The company took delivery of the first A321neo on 18 July 2018 at the Farnborough International Airshow.

On 20 November 2018, EasyJet ordered an additional 17 A320neo, taking their total neo order, including the A321neo, to 147. On 19 November 2019, EasyJet ordered an additional 12 A320neo, taking the total neo orders, including the A321neo, to 159.

On 20 July 2022, during the Farnborough International Airshow, EasyJet confirmed the placing of an order for 56 A320neo, including an upsizing of 18 A320neo from their original order to the longer A321neo model. EasyJet was reported to have secured a significant reduction on the list price of the aircraft as part of their original 2013 deal with Airbus.

In December 2023, the airline ordered ‍56 A320neo and 101 A321neo aircraft.

== Services ==
=== Booking ===
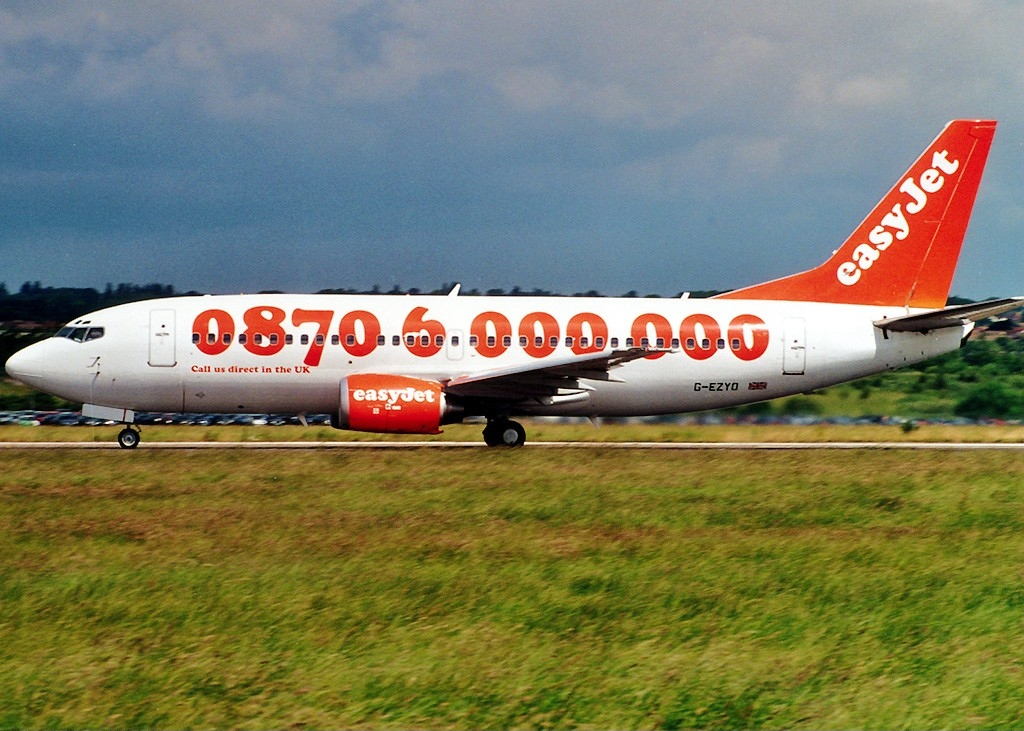
EasyJet Boeing 737-33V in the telephone number livery

Initially, booking was by telephone only; as a means of promoting this, all of the airline's aircraft were painted with the booking telephone number. There is no incentive for travel agents to book flights on the airline because it does not pay commissions, which is an industry-standard practice for low-cost carriers.

In December 1997, one of EasyJet's design and advertising agencies suggested to Stelios Haji-Ioannou that he should consider trialling a website for direct bookings. Haji-Ioannou's reply was: "The Internet is for nerds, it will never make money for my business!" Other executives of the airline saw the potential and approved a website trial involving putting a different telephone reservation number on the website to track success. Once Haji-Ioannou saw the results, he changed his mind and an e-commerce website capable of offering real-time online booking went live in April 1998; this was the first such website for a low-cost carrier in Europe.

In December 2001, the airline switched from a third-party reservation system to an in-house system. Internet bookings were priced cheaper than booking by telephone to reflect the reduced call centre costs; as a further means of encouraging the use of the website, aircraft were repainted with the web address. Within a year, over 50% of bookings were made using the website; by April 2004, the figure had reportedly jumped to 98%.

In December 2011, EasyJet launched their mobile app on the App Store and Google Play Store allowing customers to book flights and store boarding passes. In 2019, the app accounted for 21.8% of bookings made with the airline.

=== Cabin and onboard services ===
Cabin of an easyJet Airbus A320neo. Since April 2026, easyJet's newly delivered aircraft have featured Airbus Airspace Cabins.

The airline's main fleet, consisting of Airbus A319, A320, A320neo and A321neo aircraft, carry up to 156, 180, 186 and 235 passengers, respectively, depending on the layout. An Airbus A319 carries 156 passengers in a single-class configuration, but as the airline does not serve meals on its shorter flights, it opted for smaller galleys and had a lavatory installed in unused space at the rear of the aircraft. The space saved by having smaller galleys allowed for the installation of 156 seats. Due to this seating arrangement, to satisfy safety requirements, the airline's Airbus A319 aircraft have two pairs of over-wing exits, instead of the standard one-pair configuration found on most Airbus A319 aircraft.

EasyJet does not provide complimentary meals or drinks on its flights (except for some occasional charter flights operated by the airline). Passengers may purchase items on board from the "CAFE. SHOP" buy on board programme.

The airline had previously provided in-flight entertainment (IFE) in some aircraft, such as the ex-GB Airways fleet, using drop-down screens on some Airbus aircraft; by 2018, all use of IFE had been discontinued. The airline offers headphones for purchase alongside power banks for passengers to charge their own devices. During 2017, 'Air Time' was introduced on some EasyJet Switzerland flights, which enables passengers to connect to watch a selection of films and read books through an on-board WiFi network; this service is provided by Rakuten.

=== Frequent flyer, business travel and loyalty products ===
Three distinct loyalty products are offered, tailored towards business and frequent flyers. These are Flexi Fare, EasyJet Plus and a new frequent traveller loyalty programme called Flight Club. Flexi Fare is a type of ticket that is usually more expensive than the regular fare and comparable to a business ticket with other airlines. This ticket offers additional flexibility, including unlimited free date changes within a set period, free route changes, complimentary checked baggage (1x20 kg), an increased carry-on baggage allowance, and a £7.50 on-board refreshment voucher.

EasyJet Plus is an annual subscription product targeted at frequent flyers, both business and leisure. This service offers free allocated seating (including extra legroom), priority check-in, fast-track security, speedy boarding and extra cabin baggage. The airline's loyalty programme is called Flight Club.

=== EasyJet Hotels and EasyJet Holidays ===
On 14 December 2004, EasyJet and Hotelopia, a subsidiary of First Choice Holidays, launched the co-branded EasyJetHotels accommodation booking service. EasyJetHotels offers accommodation products throughout the airline's network. Customers booking flights through the airline's website are provided with quotes for several hotels at their destination. Alternatively, customers can book accommodation separately at the EasyJetHotels website.

On 28 June 2007, the airline expanded its relationship with Hotelopia by launching EasyJet Holidays, which offers Travel Trust Association protected package holidays made up of EasyJet flights and Hotelopia accommodation products.

On 6 November 2010, the airline started a venture with Low Cost Travel Group, to offer flights dynamically packaged with Low Cost Travel Group's accommodation through the EasyJet Holidays website. As of March 2011, EasyJet Holidays has provided holidays and city breaks to all of the airline's routes.

A mid November 2019 report indicated that the company planned to relaunch the package holiday business, after the bankruptcy of former competitor Thomas Cook.
