= EasyJet Switzerland =

Low-cost airline of Switzerland

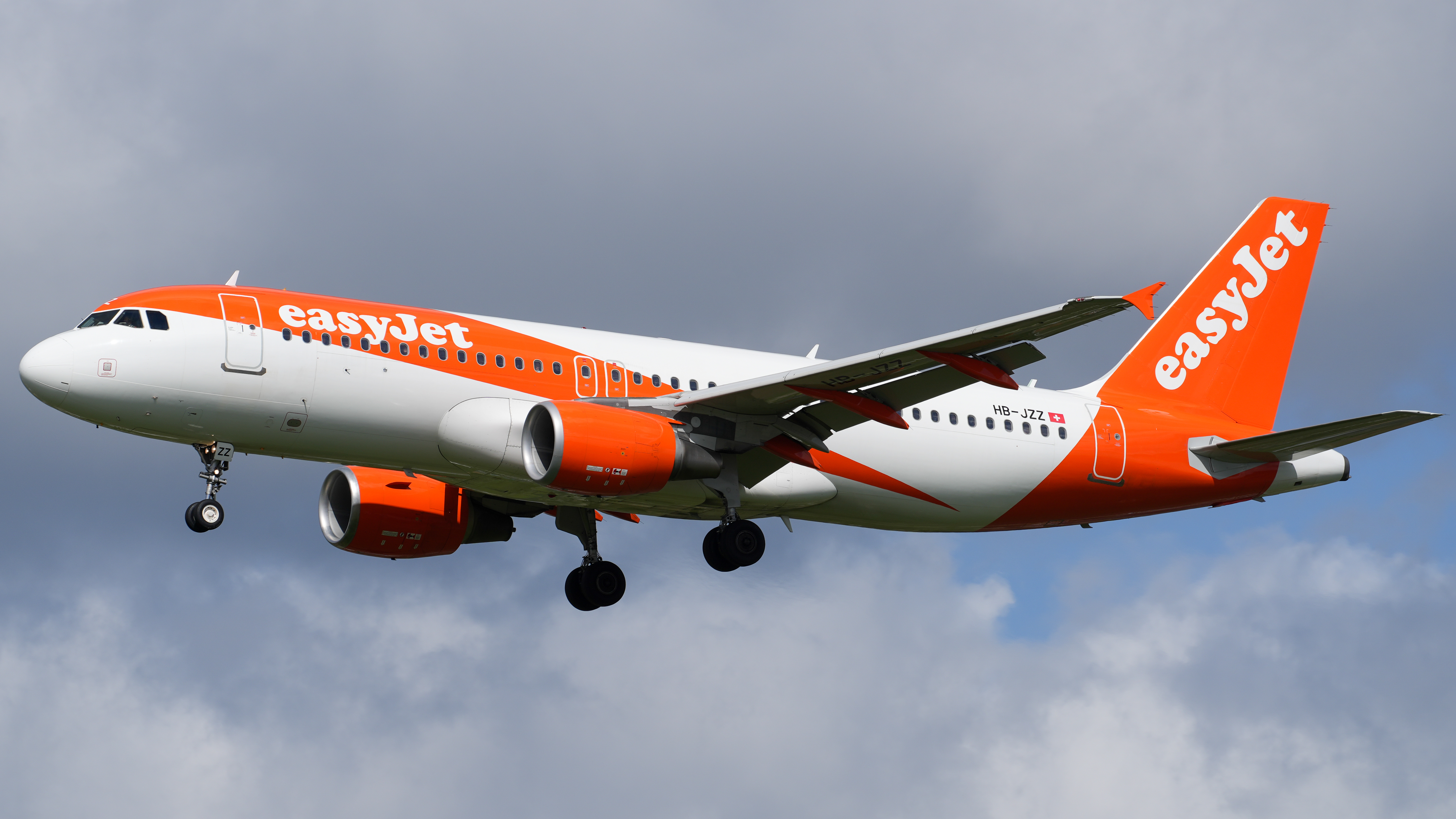
IATA	ICAO	Call sign
DS	EZS	TOPSWISS
- Founded: 18 May 1988; 38 years ago (as TEA Switzerland)
- Commenced operations: 22 March 1989; 37 years ago
- AOC #: CH.AOC.1018
- Operating bases: Basel/Mulhouse; Geneva
- Fleet size: 31
- Destinations: 80
- Parent company: EasyJet plc (40%)
- Headquarters: Meyrin, Geneva, Switzerland
- Key people: Jean-Marc Thévenaz (managing director)
- Website: www.easyjet.com

EasyJet Switzerland SA (styled as easyJet) is a Swiss low-cost airline based in Meyrin, in the canton of Geneva. It operates scheduled flights as an EasyJet franchisee from Geneva Airport and EuroAirport Basel Mulhouse Freiburg.

== History ==
The airline was established on 18 May 1988 as TEA Switzerland and started operations on 23 March 1989 as part of the TEA group. In 1998, EasyJet acquired a 40% stake in the company, and it was renamed EasyJet Switzerland on 1 April 1998

In 2013, the airline was owned by private investors (51%) and EasyJet plc (49%) and had 770 employees.

== Fleet ==
=== Current fleet ===
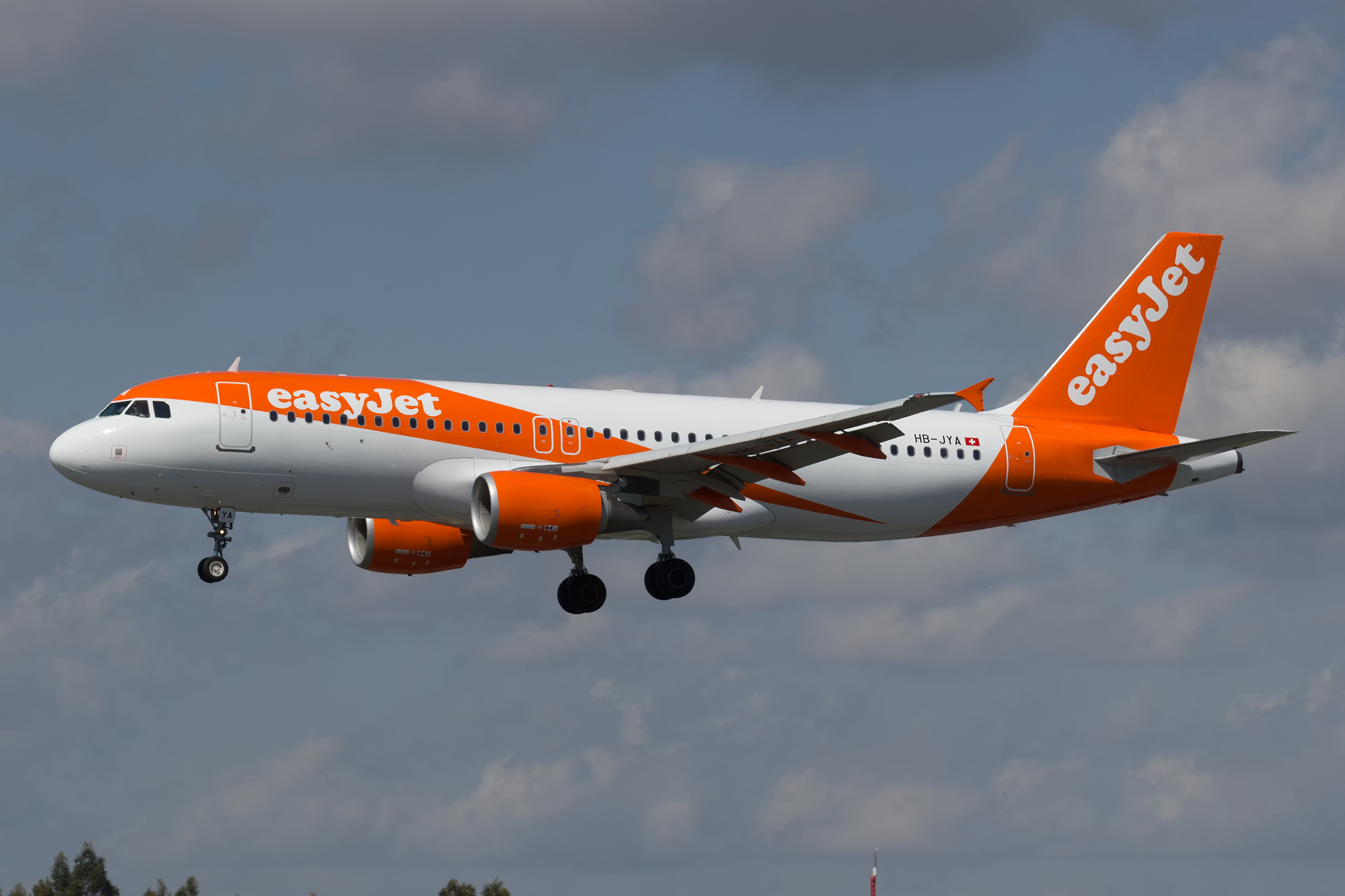
An EasyJet Switzerland Airbus A320-200

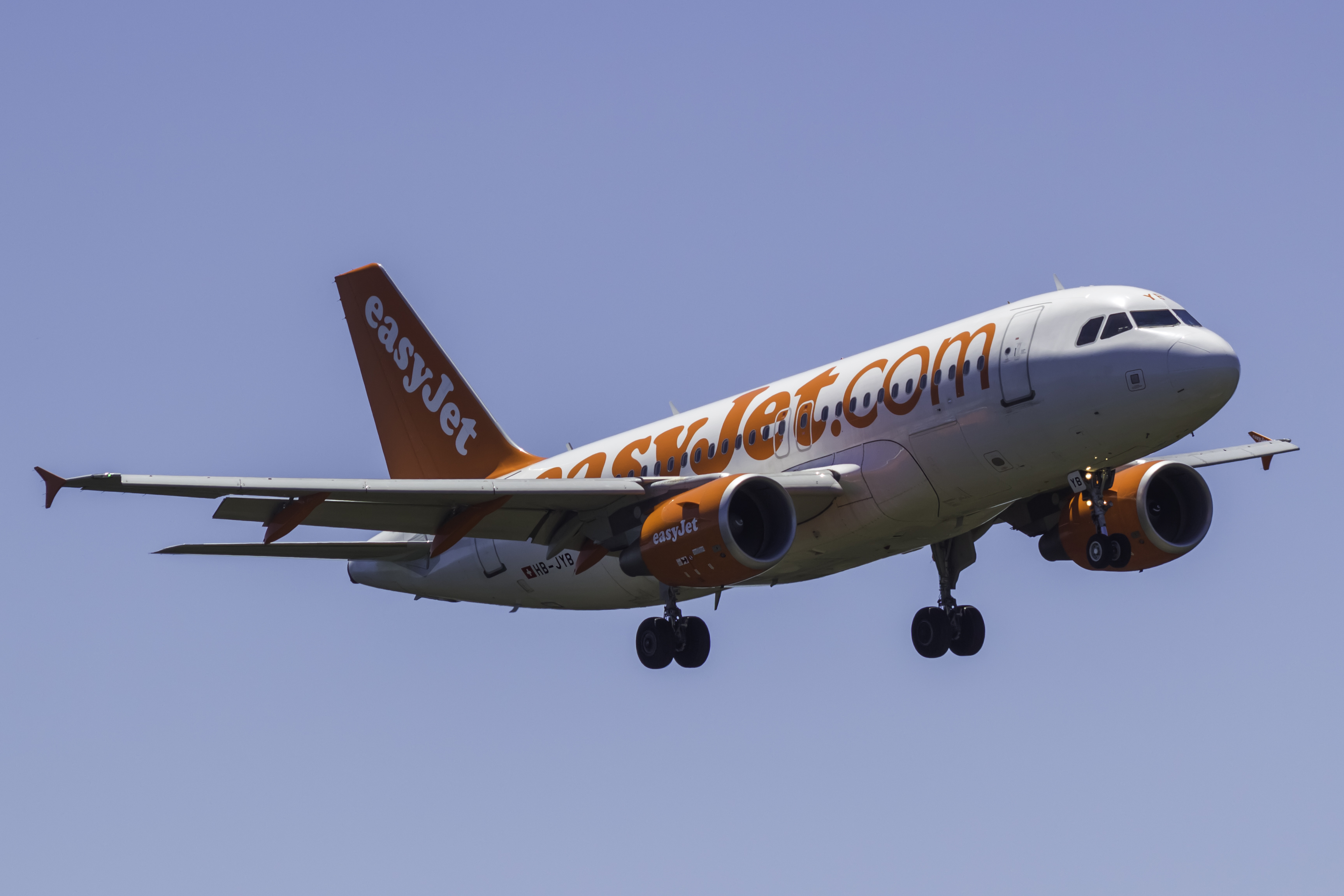
An EasyJet Switzerland Airbus A319-100 in the old livery

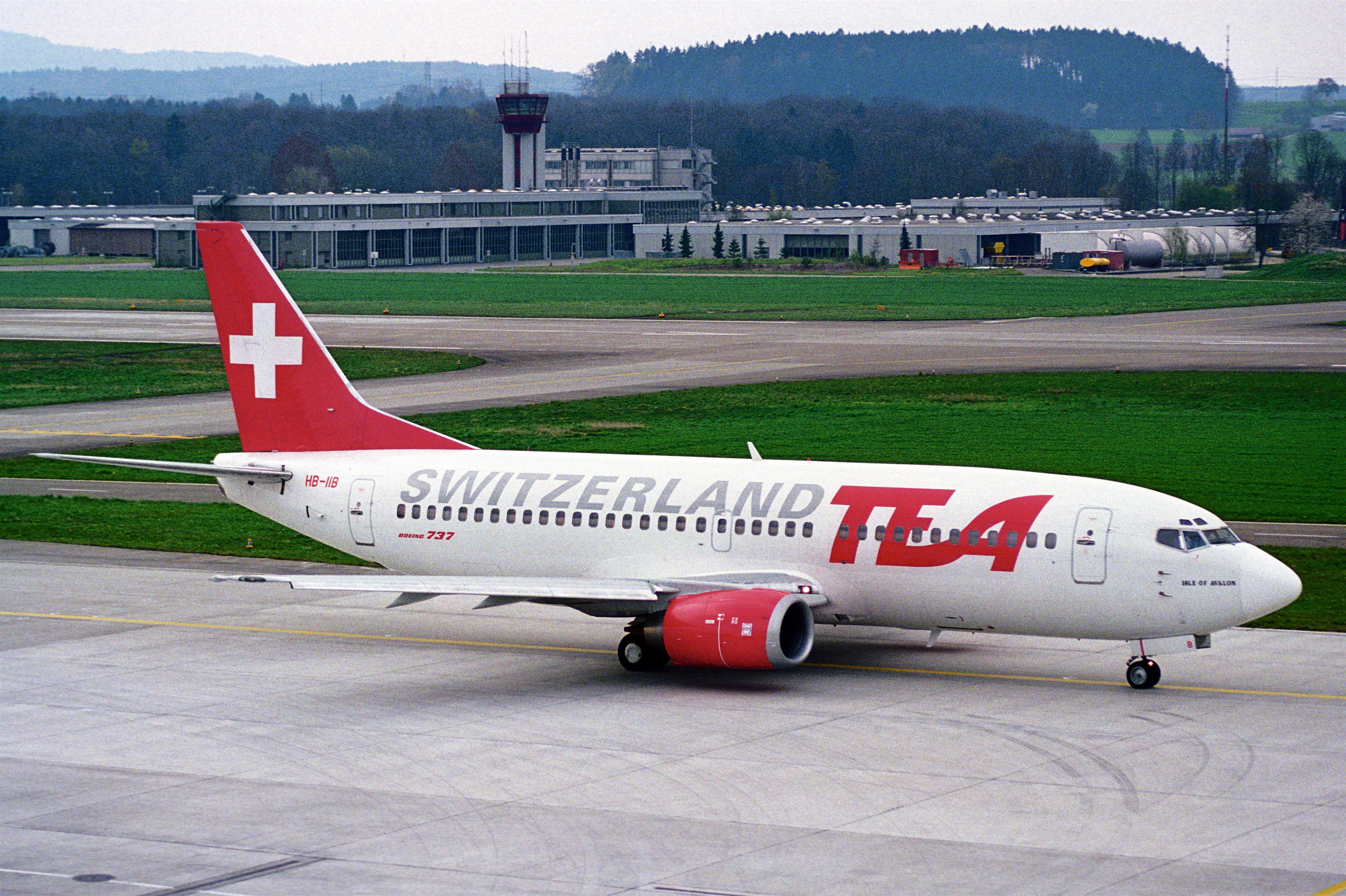
A TEA Switzerland Boeing 737-300 at Zürich in 1995

As of August 2025, EasyJet Switzerland operates the following aircraft:

EasyJet Switzerland fleet
Aircraft	In service	Orders	Passengers	Notes
Airbus A320-200	24	—	186	
Airbus A320neo	7	—	186	
Total	31	—		

=== Historical fleet ===
Over the years, the former TEA Switzerland and later EasyJet Switzerland operated the following aircraft:

Historical fleet
Aircraft	Introduced	Retired	Replacement
Boeing 737-300	1989	2010	Airbus A319-100
Airbus A319-100	2003	2023	Airbus A320-200; Airbus A320neo
