= List of accidents and incidents involving the Junkers Ju 52 =

This is a list of accidents and incidents involving the Junkers Ju 52 that have taken place since its first flight, including aircraft based on the Ju 52 airframe such as the Amiot Toucan and CASA 352. Military accidents, hijackings, and incidents of terrorism are included; acts of war are outside the scope of this list.

== 1930s ==
=== 1933 ===
27 May
An RDL (Reichsverband der Deutschen Luftfahrt-Industrie, "Reich Association of the German Aircraft Industry") Ju 52/1mcai (D-2356) burned out at Zechliner Hütte, Germany, following an engine fire.

=== 1934 ===
6 November
A Deutsche Reichsbahn-Gesellschaft (DRG) Ju 52/3mge (D-AVAN) crashed at Gross-Rackitt, Pommern, Germany while attempting an emergency landing, killing the five crew.

=== 1935 ===
31 January
A Deruluft Ju 52/3mge (D-AREN) crashed into a hill at Stettin, Germany (now Szczecin, Poland) in rain and fog, killing all 11 on board.

25 April
A Deutsche Luft Hansa (DLH) Ju 52/3mho (D-AJYR, Emil Schäfer) struck a mountain near Hallgarten, Germany, in bad weather, killing all three on board.

22 July
A Luftwaffe Ju 52/3m crashed at Hanskühnenburg, Germany for reasons unknown, killing all 11 on board.

=== 1936 ===
14 January
A Colombian Air Force Ju 52/3m (624) crashed near Tres Esquinas Air Base due to mechanical failure, killing 13 of 19 on board.

17 January
A Lloyd Aéreo Boliviano (LAB) Ju 52/3mce (registration unknown, Chorolque) crashed into the Tapacarí swamps northeast of Cochabamba, Bolivia, killing all 13 on board.

16 March
An ÖLAG (Österreichische Luftverkehrs AG, Austrian Airways) Ju 52/3m (OE-LAL) crashed on the Saualpe in a blizzard, suffering substantial damage; all five on board survived. The aircraft was operating a Vienna-Rome passenger service with stops at Graz, Klagenfurt and Venice.

17 April
A DLH Ju 52/3m (D-ASOR) struck a mountainside near Orvin, Switzerland after the crew became lost following a navigation error, killing three of five on board.

16 June
A Norwegian Air Lines Ju 52/3 mW (LN-DAE, Havørn) crashed into Mount Lihesten in fog, killing all seven on board.

20 July
A Luftwaffe Ju 52/3m struck treetops and crashed at Oberhof, Germany, killing two of four on board.

19 September
A DLH Ju 52/3mfe (D-AJUX, Hermann Goering) crashed near Frankfurt, Germany.

1 November
A DLH Ju 52/3mge (D-APOO, Heinrich Kroll) crashed into mountains near Tabarz en route to Erfurt, probably due to spatial disorientation, killing 11 of 15 on board.

17 November
A DLH Ju 52/3mge (D-ASUI, Hans Berr), en route from Leipzig Airport to Nürnberg-Marienberg Airport, crashed on the Moritzberg near Lauf an der Pegnitz, due to pilot disorientation. Four of the 16 people on board died.

28 November
A DLH Ju 52/3m (D-ATAK, Marschall v. Bieberstein) crashed on landing near Hannover, Germany; all 15 on board were able to evacuate the aircraft before it caught fire due to a ruptured fuel tank.

4 December
A DLH Ju 52/3m (D-ASIH, Rudolf Windisch) crashed in the French Alps near Le Grand-Bornand in high winds, killing all six on board.

8 December
A Condor Legion Ju 52/3m (22-78) struck a mountainside near Serranillos, Avila, Spain, killing all four on board.

=== 1937 ===
6 April
Luftwaffe Ju 52/3mg3e "33+K39" crashed at Liegnitz, Germany.

16 June
A South African Airways (SAA) Ju 52/3msa1 (ZS-AKY, Earl of Caledon) crashed on takeoff from Rand Airport due to loss of power of two engines, killing one.

1 August
A Eurasia Ju 52/3m (XVIII) crashed at Kunming, China following engine failure.

14 August
A HISMA (Sociedad Hispano-Marroquí de Transportes, "Spanish-Moroccan Transport Company") Ju 52/3m (22-51) was written off in Spain for reasons unknown.

15 October
A HISMA Ju 52/3m (22-62) was written off in Spain for reasons unknown.

October 25
Luftwaffe Ju 52/3m "S2+PO" crashed at Tutow, Germany.

November 16
A Sabena Ju 52/3m crashed at Ostend, Belgium, after striking a factory chimney, killing all 12 on board.

November 26
A DLH Ju 52/3mfe (D-AGAV, Emil Schäfer) crashed into a hangar in fog on takeoff from Croydon Airport, killing all three on board.

November
A DVL (Deutsche Versuchsanstalt für Luftfahrt, "German Research Institute for Aviation") Ju 52/3mge (D-AFYV) crashed at Roggentin, Germany during a test flight.

3 December
A DLH Ju 52/3mte (D-AXAT, Rudolf Windisch) force-landed just after takeoff from Munich, killing the pilot. The aircraft was operating mail flight "PF.229" to Baghdad.

15 December
A LAB Ju 52/3mce (CB-18, Huanani) crashed near Sorata, Bolivia on a cargo flight, killing all eight on board.

=== 1938 ===
4 January
A DLH Ju 52/3mte (D-ABUR, Charles Haar) crashed at Frankfurt in a snowstorm while on approach due to icing, killing all six on board.

22 February
A DLH Ju 52/3mge (D-APAR, Otto Parschau) crashed near Pontoise, France, in fog, killing all three on board.

30 March
An Ala Littoria Ju 52/3m (I-BEZI) crashed off Lido Airport during a training flight due to pilot error; both pilots survived.

22 May
A Syndicato Condor Ju 52/3mge (PP-CBC, Guaracy) crashed into water off Santos Dumont Airport, killing six of 17 on board; Brazilian Minister of Justice Mauricio Cardoso was among the dead.

26 June
A DLH Sucursal Peru (DLH's Peruvian subsidiary) Ju 52/3mge (OA-HHB, Misti) crashed near Chilligua, Peru, killing all seven on board.

16 July
A Eurasia Ju 52/3mge (XXI) crashed at Wuhan, China while attempting to land in strong crosswinds.

15 August
A Syndicato Condor Ju 52/3mfe (PP-CAT, Anhanga) crashed on takeoff into Guanabara Bay, killing all nine on board.

29 September
A Luftwaffe Ju 52/3m (D-AMOK) crashed on landing at Frankfurt Airport after touching down too soon due to pilot error, killing one of four on board.

1 October
A DLH Ju 52/3mte (D-AVFB) crashed on Piz Cengalo mountain near Graubünden, Switzerland, killing all 13 on board; a postal bag from the aircraft was found in 1952.

2 December
A DLH Ju 52/3mte (D-ANOY, Rudolf v. Thüna) crashed near Kahlenburg hill and caught fire; all eight on board survived. The aircraft was operating a Berlin-Vienna passenger service.

=== 1939 ===
13 January
A Syndicato Condor Ju 52/3mge (PP-CAY, Marimba) struck a mountain near Rio Bonito, Brazil, killing all 10 on board.

24 January
A Luftwaffe Ju 52/3m struck a mountain near Arrens, France, killing all five on board. The aircraft was operated by either HISMA or the Luftwaffe and was armed with two machine guns and was flown during the Spanish Civil War.

24 February
A Reichsluftfahrtministerium (RLM) Ju 52/3mge (D-ALUS) struck a mountain at Termes Ribi, Commune de Roubion, France during a snowstorm, killing all 10 on board; the wreckage was found on 4 March 1939. The aircraft was flying home pilots of the Condor Legion who had fought in Spain.

12 March
A Eurasia Ju 52/3mge (XXIII, Chiao T'ung 1) struck a mountain near Weiring, China in bad weather, killing four of six on board.

14 March
A Sabena Ju 52/3mge (OO-AUA) crashed into a field at Haren, Belgium due to pilot error, killing all three on board.

29 March
An Iberia Ju 52/3mge (M-CABD, Mola) crashed in the Sierra de Grecos, Spain.

24 April
A Luftwaffe Ju 52/3m reportedly crashed at Großer Arbersee, Germany.

29 April
A Luftwaffe Ju 52/3m crashed near Bollstadt/Amerdingen after it struck a wooden measuring tower, killing five of seven on board. The aircraft's altimeter was malfunctioning.

3 August
A DLH Ju 52/3mte (D-ANJH, Hans Loeb) was written off following a landing accident at Mingaladon Airport, Burma (now Myanmar).

4 August
A DLH Ju 52/3mte (D-AUJG, Hans Wende) crashed in the Llaberia mountains near Tivissa, Spain, killing all seven on board.

30 August
A DLH Ju 52/3mte (D-AFOP, Karl Hochmuth) crashed on takeoff from Hannover, Germany, killing all seven on board.

31 August
A Luftwaffe Ju 52/3m crashed at Zueding, Germany, probably due to pilot error, killing four of five on board.

5 September
Luftwaffe Ju 52/3m "WL-AGZG" was accidentally shot down by flak from naval ship Admiral Scheer and crashed at Wilhelmshaven-Reede, killing all nine on board.

13 September
Luftwaffe Ju 52/3m "2D+PH" crashed near Zinnitz, Germany during a mail transport flight.

22 September
A Luftwaffe Ju 52/3m struck a balloon cable and crashed near Großjena, Sachsen-Anhalt, Germany, killing all 13 on board.

9 October
Luftwaffe Ju 52/3mg4c "G6+KO" crashed at Thomasdorf (near Waldenburg), Germany after hitting a tree while flying too low, killing all seven on board.

10 October
A Luftwaffe Ju 52/3m crashed off Wangerooge, Germany due to pilot error; there were no casualties.

10 November
Spanish Air Force Ju 52/3m 22-104 crashed near Lastras de Cuellar, Segovia, Spain, killing seven of 11 on board.

4 December
An Ala Littoria Ju 52/3mlu (I-BAUS) struck a mountain and crashed near Bayerisch Eisenstein, killing four of 17 on board.

18 December
An Iberia Ju 52/3m (M-CABA, Sanjurjo) crashed at sea off Europa Point, Gibraltar in severe weather, killing all 10 on board. Although it was rumored that the aircraft was shot down from the Rock of Gibraltar or a British warship, this was deemed unlikely.

== 1940s ==
=== 1940 ===
7 April
A Luftwaffe Ju 52/3m crashed at Meurcourt, Haute Saône, France following an engine explosion, killing all nine on board. The aircraft was transporting radio equipment for espionage purposes.

9 April
A Luftwaffe Ju 52/3m crashed near Tarm, Denmark after the pilot became disorientated in fog, killing eight of nine on board.

12 April
A Luftwaffe Ju 52/3m crashed at Einfeld, Germany after failing to gain sufficient height on takeoff, killing two.

12 April
A Luftwaffe Ju 52/3m crashed in a forest at Neumünster, Germany after failing to gain sufficient height on takeoff; several crew were seriously injured, but all on board survived. The aircraft was headed to Norway.

13 April
Thirteen Luftwaffe Ju 52/3mg4e's took off from Tempelhof Airport to carry 2./A.R.112 Gebirgsbatterie and supplies to Narvik. Of these, two (SE+JZ and CN+BS) got lost in a snowstorm and force-landed on ice at Gullesfjordbotn, Troms, Norway; both aircraft were bombed by three Norwegian Heinkel He 115's the next morning and burned out and later sank when the ice melted; both aircraft crew were captured by Norwegian forces and interned in Canada for the remainder of the war. The other eleven landed on the frozen Lake Hartvikvatnet in Narvik. One aircraft (SE+KC) was able to take off again and land in Sweden, but the other ten aircraft sank in May 1940 after the ice melted. One aircraft was raised in 1983 and another four in 1986.

13 April
Two Luftwaffe Ju 52/3m's crashed in the sea at Gangsøya, Sogn og Fjordane, Norway; seven crew were taken prisoner, but ten remain missing.

14 April
Luftwaffe Ju 52/3m "1Z+AT", of 6.Staffel II/KGzbV 1, was written off in a forced landing at Vålebru, Oppland, Norway.

14 April
A Luftwaffe Ju 52/3m force-landed on the frozen River Vorma, Norway due to fuel exhaustion.

14 April
Luftwaffe Ju 52/3m "1Z+CC", of Stab II./KGzbV 1, force-landed in a field at Galterud, Hedmark, Norway; all four on board survived and were captured by Norwegian forces.

16 April
Luftwaffe Ju 52/3mg4e "1Z+IY", of 14.Staffel IV/KGr.zbV.1, struck a cliff at Kvamen in Sokndal Municipality, Rogaland, Norway in bad weather, killing all four on board.

16 April
Luftwaffe Ju 52/3m "BA+KK" crashed off Tofte, Norway, killing all 17 on board.

17 April
Luftwaffe Ju 52/3m "IZ+FT", of III./KGr.zbV.I, crashed on ice at Langevannet, Fosselandsheia, Vest-Agder, Norway and sank, killing all 17 on board.

10 May
157 (of 430) Luftwaffe Ju 52/3m's were lost during the German invasion of the Netherlands and Belgium; at least 900 crew/troops were killed.

14 May
Luftwaffe Ju 52/3m "9P+KK" crashed at Bierset, Belgium.

20 May
Luftwaffe Ju 52/3mg "CN+HJ", of KG.zbV 106, performed an emergency landing on the frozen Lake Kjerringvatnet after an engine failed on takeoff; the aircraft later sank. In the summer of 1943, the aircraft was blown up by the Germans.

23 May
A LARES Ju 52/3mba (YR-ABF) was reportedly written off at Bazargio-Dobruja, Romania.

26 May
A Luftwaffe Ju 52/3m of 1./KGrzbV 107 (Fliegerkorps X) struck trees for reasons unknown and crashed at Åmot, Østerdalen, Hedmark, Norway, killing all 15 on board. The aircraft was on its way to Narvik with paratroopers and drop containers.

28 May
A Luftwaffe Ju 52/3m crashed at Ulmet/Kusel, Germany, killing all five on board.

7 June
A Luftwaffe Ju 52/3m of KGrzbV 105 crashed shortly after takeoff from Koblenz, Germany; all three on board survived.

7 June
A Luftwaffe Ju 52/3m of KGrzbV 105 crashed shortly after takeoff from Charleville, France, killing all four on board.

7 June
A Luftwaffe Ju 52/3m of KGrzbV 105 crashed shortly after takeoff from Mannheim Airport, killing one.

14 June
Aero O/Y (now Finnair) Ju 52/3mge "Kaleva" (OH-ALL) en route from Tallinn to Helsinki was shot down over the Gulf of Finland by two Soviet bombers although Finland and the Soviet Union were not at war at the time. The crew of two and all seven passengers, including one American and two French diplomatic couriers, were killed. A short time later, a Soviet submarine picked up flotsam, including diplomatic mailbags. The reason for the peacetime attack on a civilian aircraft has been speculated to have involved the diplomatic mail.

30 October
A Luftwaffe Ju 52/3m struck the side of Hocheck mountain near Watzmann in bad weather, killing all six on board; the wreckage was found in the summer of 2003.

4 November
A LAB Ju 52/3mbe (CB-17) struck trees and crashed at Rincón del Tigre, Chiquitos, Bolivia due to weather, killing all 14 on board; the wreckage was located in January 1942.

8 November
A VASP Ju-52/3mg3e (PP-SPF) taking off from Rio de Janeiro-Santos Dumont to São Paulo-Congonhas collided in mid-air with a de Havilland Dragonfly, registration LV-KAB belonging to the Anglo Mexican Petroleum Company (Shell-Mex), which was preparing for a water-landing in front of Fluminense Yacht Club. Both aircraft crashed, killing all 14 passengers and four crew on the VASP aircraft and the pilot of the Shell-Mex aircraft.

16 November
A Luftwaffe Ju 52/3m crashed at Brest, France, killing all 11 on board.

=== 1941 ===
1 January
A Luftwaffe Ju 52 See (a floatplane version of the Ju 52), of Luftwaffe 1./KGr.zbV 108, crashed at Bodø, Norway while attempting an emergency landing due to bad weather; there were no casualties.

2 January
A Luftwaffe Ju 52 See, of Luftwaffe 1./KGr.zbV 108, was destroyed in a storm while moored at Hommelvik Seaplane Base; no casualties.

4 January
A Luftwaffe Ju 52/3mg6e force-landed on a snow-covered field in bad weather on the Umbalkees Glacier, Austria, killing one of 11 on board; the wreck was discovered in 2002.

8 January
South African Air Force Ju 52/3msai 668 crashed 8 mi northeast of Mbeya, Tanzania, killing all 15 on board.

17 January
A Malert Ju 52/3mg3e (HA-JUA, Kaszala Karoly) crashed near Nagyvárad (Oradea), Hungary, killing all 12 on board.

28 January
Luftwaffe Ju 52/3mg6e 6880, of 1. Staffel/KGr.zbV 9, crashed at Rhodos Island, Greece, killing seven of 13 on board.

2 February
Portuguese Air Force Ju 52/3mge 201 was destroyed in a hangar collapse at Sintra Air Base during a storm along with 10 Breda Ba.65s.

13 February
A Luftwaffe Ju 52/3m, of Blindflugschule 2, struck Mont Tezio (near Perugia, Italy) for reasons unknown, killing three of five on board.

17 February
Luftwaffe Ju 52/3mg5e "4V+EH", of 1. Staffel/KGr.zbV 9, disappeared over the Straits of Messina, Italy with four on board, probably after striking the sea while flying too low; three crew remain MIA and a fourth is KIA.

19 February
Spanish Air Force Ju 52/3m 22-89 was written off in Spain for reasons unknown.

1 March
An Iberia Ju 52/3mge (EC-AAJ, Guadalquivir) crashed at Palma de Mallorca, Spain; all nine on board survived.

1 March
A DLH Ju 52/3mte (D-AQAB) landed in Hommelvik Bay off Trondheim, but became airborne again after hitting a dune crest. After reaching a height of 4–5 m (13–16 ft), the aircraft landed hard on the water; both floats broke off and the aircraft nosed down, killing three of nine on board.

7 April
During a snowstorm in the Bad Vöslau / Vienna area, five Luftwaffe Ju 52/3m ("G6+KH", "1Z+CL", "1Z+KK", "1Z+LL, and "1Z+JK") crashed at Leithagebirge, Austria, killing 31. The aircraft were part of a group of 16 on a mission to Romania.

21 April
Luftwaffe Ju 52/3m "NO+RH" crashed in the Apuseni Mountains north of Deva, Romania due to pilot error, killing all 16 on board.

22 April
A Luftwaffe Ju 52/3m crashed west of Kumanovo, North Macedonia while attempting an emergency landing, killing at least four.

23 April
A Luftwaffe Ju 52/3m, of 4./KG.zbV 1, crashed in the southern Carpathians, Romania, killing one of four on board.

20 May
Luftwaffe Ju 52/3m "G6+EK" crashed near Alikarnassos, Iraklion, Greece, killing two of four on board.

20 May
Luftwaffe Ju 52/3m "9P+MU" crashed at Chania-Alikianu, Greece, killing all four on board.

24 May
A Luftwaffe Ju 52/3m crashed at Kalamos, Tanagra, Greece, killing two of four on board.

25 June
A Luftwaffe Ju 52/3m, of 1./KGr.zbV 50, crashed near Pasenow, Germany for reasons unknown, killing two of four on board.

27 June
Luftwaffe Ju 52/3m "P4+??" struck Tønnølfjellet, Oksvoll, Sør-Trøndelag, in thick fog, killing 13 of 14 on board.

22 August
Luftwaffe Ju 52/3m "BJ+YQ" crashed at Langendiebach Airfield during a training flight when the pilots were blinded by searchlight beacons; all three crew on board survived.

8 October
Luftwaffe Ju 52 See "HE+DK", of Transportstaffel 1./KGr.zbV 108, force-landed at Homlafossen, Dølan, Sør-Trøndelag, Norway due to overloading; all four on board survived. The pilot was later killed in a 1942 crash.

20 October
A DLH Ju 52/3m (D-AUXZ, Otto v. Beaulieau-Marconay) crashed at Gabrene, Petrich, Bulgaria, killing all 13 on board.

2 November
Luftwaffe Ju 52 See "DR+WH", of 1./KGr.zbV 108, crashed at Risvik, Salsbruket, Nord-Trondelag, Norway, killing one of 13 on board.

7 November
An Aero O/Y Ju 52/3mce (OH-LAK, Sampo) made an emergency landing in the Gulf of Finland off Turku following triple engine failure due to poor fuel quality; two (of 16 on board) drowned while attempting to swim to safety.

28 November
A Luftwaffe Ju 52/3m struck an obstacle at Kjevik Airfield, Norway; no casualties.

November
A Luftwaffe Ju 52/3m crashed in thick fog at Arzburg, Germany; all three on board survived.

26 December
Luftwaffe Ju 52/3m "1Z+IT" crashed in the sea off Tympakiou, Crete, killing three of four on board.

=== 1942 ===
13 January
Luftwaffe Ju 52/3mg4e "G6+GW", of 4./KGr.zbV.104, disappeared while on a flight to or from Targsorul Nou, Romania with nine on board; the wreckage was found in 2009 in the Black Sea off Odesa, Ukraine. Bad weather was blamed for the crash.

14 January
A Luftwaffe Ju 52/3mge of Blindflugschule 4 burned out in a hangar fire at Kastrup Airfield, Denmark.

12 February
During the Stalingrad Airlift, 488 Ju 52/3m's were lost with around 1000 crew and troops killed.

24 February
During the Demjansk Airlift, 262 Ju 52/3m's were lost with around 300 crew and troops killed.

28 February
A Varig Ju 52/3mge (PP-VAL, Mauá) crashed on takeoff from Porto Alegre Airport into the River Guaíba, killing seven of 23 on board.

20 March
A military Ju 52 stuck the Spitzmauer, a mountain in the Dead Mountains in Austria, in fog, killing all 4 on board. The remains were discovered on 10 May 1942. Some debris are still visible from the hiking trail across the Klinser Scharte. A memorial cross close to the site carries a license plate from one of the aircraft's units. One part of the landing gear is used as a trail blaze.

24 March
Luftwaffe Ju 52/3m "BJ+ET" crashed 20 mi south-southwest of Porchov, Russia, killing all four on board.

22 April
Luftwaffe Ju 52/3mg4e "P4+HH", of Transportstaffel Fl.Führ.Nord, struck a mountain in dense fog near Breitind, Nordland, Norway en route to Petsamo, Finland (now Pechenga, Russia), killing all 18 on board.

9 May
A Luftwaffe Ju 52/3m crashed and burned near Uman, Ukraine, killing all five on board.

22 May
Luftwaffe Ju 52/3mg4e "7U+IK", of 2./KG.zbV.108, struck a mountain at Fugløy, Nordland, Norway (25 km (16 mi) southwest of Bodø), killing all five on board.

1 August
Luftwaffe Ju 52/3m "7U+LK", of 2./KG.zbV.108, ditched in the sea off Langfjorden in Alta, Finnmark, Norway in bad weather; no casualties. The aircraft was later salvaged by the Germans, but was written off in a crash two months later.

22 October
A DLH Ju 52/3m (D-AYGX, Johannes Höroldt) struck a wooded hillside at 380 m (1,250 ft) near Bukovac, Serbia while flying in clouds, killing all 17 on board. The pilot had received incorrect weather information and thought the cloud base was at 600 m (2,000 ft).

22 October
Luftwaffe Ju 52/3mg4e "9P+ES", of 4./KG.zbV.50, crashed near Tanndorf, Germany due to mechanical failure, killing all four on board.

30 October
Luftwaffe Ju 52/3mge "7U+LK", of 2./KG.zbV.108, force-landed at Øverlihøgda in Ringebu Municipality, Norway, due to icing, killing two of eight on board. The flight was going from Oslo Fornebu to Vaernes and Banak. After the crash, four occupants hiked to a nearby cabin. The wreckage was found three days later on November 3. The wreck remained in the crash location (61°33'57.4"N 10°27'28.9"E) although it has been slightly vandalized until it was removed in 2024.

3 November
A Luftwaffe Ju 52/3m, of 4./KG.zbV.300, struck Monte Calino, Italy, killing all five on board.

5 November
Luftwaffe Ju 52/3mg4e "7U+FK" struck Rendalen mountain at 1,450 m (4,760 ft), probably due to icing, killing the five crew. The aircraft was en route to Banak Air Base with spare parts for the German aircraft based there.

11 November
An Iberia Ju 52/3mge (EC-AAF, La Cierva) was written off at Las Palmas.

13 November
Luftwaffe Ju 52/3mg5e See "7U+FH" crashed at Tangedalskaret (15 km (9.3 mi) west of Solheim), killing all six on board; the wreckage was found on 18 December 1942.

13 November
Luftwaffe Ju 52/3m "G6+AZ", of KGr.zbV.S 7 (Reggio), crashed near Trapani, Italy, killing all 20 on board.

14 November
A Luftwaffe Ju 52/3m, of 3./KG.zbV.172, crashed north of Kazanlak, Bulgaria due to icing, killing all four on board.

19 November
Luftwaffe Ju 52/3m "V1+EB", of Fl.Ber./VIII.Fl.Korps, crashed at Makiivka, near Stalino (now Donetsk), Ukraine for reasons unknown, killing all four on board.

14 December
A Luftwaffe Ju 52/3m, of 3./KG.zbV.1, crashed off Sicily for reasons unknown, killing seven of 13 on board.

18 December
A DDL Ju 52/3m (OY-DAL, Selandia) crashed near Vienna, killing two of 16 on board.

=== 1943 ===
1 January
A Sabena Ju 52/3mge (OO-AUG) crashed 80 mi from Bangui, Central African Republic.

1 March
A DLH Ju 52/3m (D-AQUB, Hans Berr) crashed on landing at Trondheim/Hommelvik Seaplane Base; no casualties.

19 May
Luftwaffe Ju 52/3m "GG+FL" crashed at Gyulaj, Hungary following an engine fire, killing nine of ten on board.

26 May
A Luftwaffe Ju 52/3m crashed between Castelvetrano and Naples, Italy for reasons unknown, killing six of 19 on board.

27 August
A VASP Ju-52/3mg3e (PP-SPD) flying from São Paulo-Congonhas to Rio de Janeiro-Santos Dumont struck a building of the Naval Academy located close to the airport shortly after a second attempt at landing in Rio under fog. The aircraft broke in two and one part fell into the water. Of the 21 passengers and crew, three survived.

1 September
Luftwaffe Ju 52/3m "4V+HN" crashed 34 mi east of Lviv, Ukraine for reasons unknown, killing 17 of 19 on board.

6 September
A Luftwaffe Ju 52/3m ditched at sea off Kea, Greece due to fuel starvation, killing one.

28 September
Luftwaffe Ju 52/3m "CK+QI" force-landed at Aroybukt, Troms, Norway following engine problems; all ten on board survived.

24 October
An Aeroflot Ju 52/3m (CCCP-L37) struck trees and crashed upside down near Asha, Russia in bad weather due to pilot and ATC errors, killing all five on board. The aircraft was operating a Kuibyshev (now Samara)-Ufa-Chelyabinsk cargo flight.

6 November
Luftwaffe Ju 52/3m "GG+FH" force-landed on the Black Sea; all 21 on board remain missing.

22 November
A Luftwaffe Ju 52/3m crashed northwest of Jagodina, Serbia for reasons unknown, killing two of four on board.

21 December
A Luftwaffe Ju 52/3m crashed at Văliug (Franzdorf), Romania in the Semenic Mountains for reasons unknown, killing three of four on board.

25 December
A Luftwaffe Ju 52/3m force-landed at Gardermoen Airport due to fuel exhaustion; all 14 on board survived.

31 December
A Luftwaffe Ju 52/3m crashed at Perugia, Italy in severe weather, killing all eight on board.

=== 1944 ===
15 January
A DLH Ju 52/3m (D-ADQW, Harry Rother) struck a hill in poor weather while descending for Zemun Airfield, killing all five on board.

27 January
Luftwaffe Ju 52/3m "L5+GH" force-landed in snow in the mountains at Trinksteinsattel, Austria; all five on board survived.

1 February
Luftwaffe Ju 52/3m "P4+CH" struck a mountain at Aakenustunturi, Finland in poor weather, killing the three crew.

3 February
A Luftwaffe Ju 52/3m crashed in Germany.

19 February
A Luftwaffe Ju 52/3m crashed in the Passendalestraat in Belchem, Belgium after striking a church, killing all three on board.

21 February
A DLH Ju 52/3m (D-AWAS, Joachim Blankenburg) disappeared off Greece with 16 on board; the wreckage was never found.

22 February
A Luftwaffe Ju 52/3mg14e crashed near Nikolayev, Ukraine, killing at least two.

29 February
A Luftwaffe Ju 52/3m crashed between Tiraspol and Crimea; all four on board were declared MIA.

2 March
Luftwaffe Ju 52/3m "1Z+KL" crashed in a snowstorm at Ossig, Germany, killing all four on board.

4 March
Luftwaffe Ju 52/3m "1Z+FZ" crashed between Eleusis and Malemes, Greece for reasons unknown; all four on board were declared MIA.

25 March
A Sabena Ju 52/3mge (OO-AGU) crashed at Costermanville, DR Congo.

3 April
A Sabena Ju 52/3mge (OO-AUF) crashed at Mongena, DR Congo.

7 April
Luftwaffe Ju 52/3m "8T+MP" crashed at Jagielnica, Poland for reasons unknown, killing all four on board.

10 April
Luftwaffe Ju 52/3m "RP+AX", of 4./KG.zbV.106, disappeared over the North Sea from Uetersen, Germany to Stavanger, Norway with 15 on board, probably due to bad weather.

14 April
A Luftwaffe Ju 52/3m, flipped over and crashed on landing at Zemun Water Aerodrome (near Belgrade), Serbia, killing at least one.

5 May
Luftwaffe Ju 52/3m "4V+BL" crashed at Jijilis, Romania, killing all four on board.

28 May
Luftwaffe Ju 52/3mg4e (MS) 500132 crashed in the North Sea 7.5 mi off Wangerooge, Germany for reasons unknown, killing all four on board.

7 June
A Luftwaffe Ju 52/3m crashed at Cazaux, France, killing all four on board.

27 June
A Luftwaffe Ju 52/3m was reportedly written off at Deelen Air Base, Netherlands.

30 June
Luftwaffe Ju 52/3mg8e "RV+IT" crashed 19 mi northwest of Poprad, Western Tatra, Slovakia; all four on board survived.

June
A NKAP (Narodnyy Komissariat Aviatsionnoy Promyshlennosti- "state commissariat for aviation industry") Ju 52/3m (CCCP-I354) was written off in Russia.

2 July
Luftwaffe Ju 52/3m "1Z+FQ" crashed 9 mi off Hydra, Greece due to engine failure, killing at least one.

20 July
An Aeroflot Ju 52/3m (CCCP-L40, ex Luftwaffe "PI+BH") was being ferried from Alma-Ata (now Almaty) to Kuibyshev (now Samara) for state trials with the NII GVF when it stalled and crashed in the Dzhil-Dhuta near Kok-Su, Kazakhstan while attempting to avoid bad weather, killing all six on board. The aircraft had been re-engined with two Shvetsov M-25Vs replacing the three BMW 132s.

27 August
An Iberia Ju 52/3mge (EC-AAG, Tajo) crashed at Cabo Tres Forcas (Ras Taksefi), Morocco.

16 October
A DLH Ju 52/3m (D-ADQU) crashed in the Lifjeld Mountains in poor weather, killing all 15 on board.

16 October
DLH Flight 7, a Ju 52/3mg8e (D-ADQV, Hermann Stache), crashed into a mountain at Hestnutan, Norway due to radio failure, killing all 15 on board. The aircraft was operating an international scheduled Berlin-Copenhagen-Oslo service.

25 October
Luftwaffe Ju 52/3m "G6+HH", of 1./TG 4, crashed 5 mi southeast of Zagreb, Croatia, killing five of six on board.

6 November
Luftwaffe Ju 52/3m "7U+IL", of 10./III.TG 20, struck a mountain at Digerronden, Oppland, Norway after deviating from its flight route in bad weather, killing all 14 on board. The wreckage was found by the Germans on 16 June 1945 and then rediscovered by the Norwegians in 1959. Three bodies were recovered in 1963 and another four in 1989.

17 December
Four Luftwaffe Ju 52/3m's ("4V+OP", "G6+MU", "G6+EV" and "4V+GP") crashed while supporting the Battle of the Bulge, killing at least seven with at least another four declared MIA.

17 December
During Operation Stosser, Luftwaffe Ju 52/3mg7e 7251, of 5./TG 3, crashed on takeoff from Lippspringe Airfield; no casualties.

=== 1945 ===
10 January
A DLH Ju 52/3m (D-AUSS, Joseph Langfeld) crashed near Prnjavor, Bosnia and Herzegovina, killing all seven on board.

11 January
A Luftwaffe Ju 52/3m crashed over Budapest; all four crew remain MIA.

14 January
An Aeroflot/Tajikistan Ju 52/3m (CCCP-L46) crashed in the Rangon mountains, southeast of Stalinabad (now Dushanbe), following an in-flight fire, killing the three crew; the fire was probably caused by a fuel leak.

22 January
Luftwaffe Ju 52/3mg8e "4V+BR" crashed at Bad Steinbach, Germany following engine failure, killing one of four on board.

27 January
Luftwaffe Ju 52/3mg4e "4V+PH" crashed near Legnica, Poland in bad weather; all three on board survived.

31 January
Luftwaffe Ju 52/3m "G6-QV", of 3./TG 4, 11. Kompanie, disappeared in eastern Germany while on a flight from Gdansk (then Danzig) to Cottbus with 12 on board; all on board were declared MIA and presumed dead.

4 February
Luftwaffe Ju 52/3mg5e "4V+FV", of 11./TG 3, crashed in the Budapest area, Hungary; all four on board were declared MIA.

7 February
Luftwaffe Ju 52/3m "4V+NU", of 10./TG 3, crashed in the Budapest area, Hungary; all four on board were declared MIA.

11 February
Luftwaffe Ju 52/3mg14e "8T+LV", of 11./TG 2, crashed between Papa and Budapest, Hungary, killing two of four crew; the other two remain MIA.

23 February
Luftwaffe Ju 52/3mg4e "4V+DR" struck a mountain at Klein Aupa, Germany (now Mala Upa, Czech Republic), killing all eight on board.

23 February
Luftwaffe Ju 52/3m "VB+NO" struck a ridge at Slunecní jama-Snežka, Czech Republic while flying through a snowstorm, killing 23 of 28 on board. The aircraft was operating an ambulance flight from Breslau (now Wroclaw) to Hradec Králové.

6 March
Luftwaffe Ju 52/3m "8T-NR", of 7./TG 2, crashed at Braunau, Austria due to icing, killing all four on board.

13 March
A Luftwaffe Ju 52/3m crashed at Aalborg West, Denmark in heavy fog, killing all five on board.

15 March
An Aeroflot/Turkmenistan Ju 52/3m (CCCP-L41, ex. DLH D-AKOO) was being ferried from Ashkhabad (now Ashgabat) to Alma-Ata (now Almaty) for overhaul by ARM-405 when it crashed near Chardzhou Airport following engine failure; all seven on board survived.

17 March
Luftwaffe Ju 52/3m "4V+EP", of 6./TG 3, crashed on takeoff from Breslau, Germany (now Wroclaw, Poland) for reasons unknown, killing four of eight on board.

21 March
Luftwaffe Ju 52/3m "8T+CT", of 9./TG 2, crashed at Wroclaw, Poland (then Breslau, Germany); all four on board were declared MIA.

13 April
A Luftwaffe Ju 52/3m crashed at Fahrenkamp, Germany following engine failure, killing all four on board.

26 April
Luftwaffe Ju 52/3m "4V+GR", of 7./TG 3, struck a tree and crashed while landing at Berlin, killing one; another was declared MIA.

8 May
Luftwaffe Ju 52/3mge "7U+OK", of 2./TG 20, crashed into a house at Buvika, Sør-Trøndelag, Norway while attempting an emergency landing; all three on board survived and no one in the house was injured. The aircraft had been stolen by three drunk Germans at Ørland airfield intending to fly to Sweden.

16 May
Spanish Air Force Ju 52/3m 22-95 crashed on takeoff from León Airport, killing all 12 on board. The aircraft was being used for instrument flight training.

11 August
Royal Norwegian Air Force Ju 52/3m "7U+NL" crashed on landing at Bardufoss Airport; no casualties.

10 September
An Air France Amiot AAC.1 (F-BAJP) was written off at Le Bourget Airport.

31 October
An Aero OY Ju 52/3mce (OH-LAK) crashed in a forest while on an RCA approach to Hyvinkaa Airport after the aircraft descended too low due to bad weather and poor radio reception; all 14 on board survived.

10 November
An Air France Amiot AAC.1 (F-BANO) was written off at Le Bourget Airport.

23 November
An Air France Amiot AAC.1 (F-BAKL) was written off at Toulouse, France.

=== 1946 ===
13 January
An Air France Amiot AAC.1 (F-BANP) crashed at Le Bouscat, Bordeaux after the wing struck a church steeple in poor visibility, killing both pilots.

2 February
An Air France Amiot AAC.1 (F-BALK) was written off at Belo Airport after it crashed on takeoff.

4 February
An Air France Amiot AAC.1 (F-BAKO) was written off at Menorca Island following engine failure.

6 February
An Aeroflot/Turkmenistan Ju 52/3m (CCCP-L35) stalled and crashed near Darvaza Airport after the left horizontal stabilizer separated, killing all six on board.

7 February
Spanish Air Force Ju 52/3m T.2-5 struck trees and crashed while on approach to Huerta in poor visibility, killing all 10 on board.

5 March
A Československé státní aerolinie (CSA - Československé státní aerolinie - Czechoslovak State Airlines) Ju 52/3m (OK-ZDN) crashed after repeated landing attempts at Prague airport, killing ten of 15 on board.

28 April
En route to Moscow, Aeroflot/West Siberia Ju 52/3m (CCCP-L27, ex Luftwaffe "BV+OP") suffered an engine fire; the crew diverted to Kazan and landed safely. The engine was repaired and the crew left for Moscow. But shortly after takeoff, the engine caught fire again and a second engine lost power. Control was lost and the aircraft stalled and crashed in a wooded area. There were no casualties.

22 May
A Det Norske Luftfartselskap A/S (DNL - The Norwegian Aviation Company) Ju 52/3m2e, (LN-LAB) crashed after takeoff from Oslo after the aircraft stalled due to engine failure, killing 12 of 13 on board.

28 June
An Air France Amiot AAC.1 (F-BAJS) struck power lines and crashed near Pau, France, during a mail flight, killing two of the three crew.

8 August
An Air France Amiot AAC.1 (F-BAJT) was written off at Le Bourget Airport.

12 August
French Air Force Ju 52/3m B-46 crashed on Djouce Mountain (near Enniskerry) in Ireland after the pilot became disorientated in bad weather; all 27 on board survived. The aircraft was operating a charter flight from Le Bourget to Dublin, flying 21 Guides de France members to Ireland for a camping trip.

4 September
A Compagnie Générale Transsaharienne (CGT - General Trans-Saharan Company) Amiot AAC.1 (F-BBYS) struck a concrete wall while landing at Ain el Bey Airport, Algeria; no casualties. Although the accident ripped off the rear section of the aircraft, the aircraft was repaired and returned to service.

10 October
An Air Ocean Amiot AAC.1 (F-BCAA) struck a cliff 10 km (6.2 mi) south of Sefrou, Morocco, killing all 16 on board.

23 October
A SOCOTRA Amiot AAC.1 (F-BCHD) crashed at Gebel Kalamoun, Egypt, and burned out, killing one of 24 on board.

26 October
A Transports Aériens Intercontinentaux (TAI - Intercontinental Air Transport) Amiot AAC.1 (F-BBYL) was written off at Marignane Airport, France.

1 November
A CTA Languedoc-Roussillon Amiot AAC.1 (F-BCAD) struck a hill at Saint-Léger-la-Montagne, France, due to possible wing icing, killing 23 of 27 on board in the joint-deadliest accident involving the Ju 52.

22 November
Argentine Air Force Ju 52/3mge T-165 crashed in Argentina.

25 November
Spanish Air Force Ju 52/3m T.2-76 struck a mountain in fog near Valdenoche, Spain, killing eight of 10 on board.

1946
An Aeroflot Ju 52/3m (CCCP-L26/28) was being ferried from Alma-Ata (now Almaty), Kazakhstan to Novosibirsk, Russia when it crashed into mountains near Taldi-Kurgan, Kazakhstan in a storm, killing the four crew. The aircraft had been re-engined with two Shvetsov M-62IR engines replacing the three original BMW 132's.

=== 1947 ===
January 26
A British European Airways (BEA) Ju 52/3mg8e (G-AHOK) was written off at Renfrew, United Kingdom.

5 March
An Air France Amiot AAC.1 (F-BAKP) was written off at Le Bourget Airport.

20 March
An Air France Amiot AAC.1 (F-BAKM) was written off at Freetown, Sierra Leone.

30 April
An Air France Amiot AAC.1 (F-BBYG) was written off at Niamey, Niger.

7 June
An Air France Amiot AAC.1 (F-BAKV) was written off at Yoff Airport.

July 1
Air France Flight 612, an Amiot AAC.1 (F-BALF), crashed near Eseka, Cameroon, killing all 13 on board.

July 15
An Aéro Cargo Amiot AAC.1 (F-BCHH) skidded off the runway while landing at Charmeil Airport, killing one of 19 on board.

August 13
A French Air Force Amiot AAC-1 crashed near Chevilly during a night training exercise, killing all eight on board.

August 30
An Air Atlas Amiot AAC.1 (F-BCHQ) struck high ground near El Ajeb, Morocco, killing one.

November 13
A Société Auxiliaire de Navigation Aérienne (SANA) Amiot AAC.1 (F-BDYH) struck high ground in the Jura Mountains near Bouchox, France, killing both pilots.

=== 1948 ===
21 January
A French Air Force Amiot AAC.1 crashed in a valley near Moulouya, Morocco during a storm, killing three of five on board.

2 March
A Société de Transports Aériens (STA) Amiot AAC.1 (F-BBYC) crashed in the Golfe du Lion off Perpignan, France, killing the four crew.

=== 1949 ===
February 3
An Aeroflot Ju 52/3m (CCCP-L54) struck a mountain after flying through snow; both pilots survived, but the aircraft was written off.

February 7
A MAP Tyumen No. 26 Ju 52/3m (CCCP-I511) crashed in the taiga near Mezenka, Russia after all three engines failed due to snow ingestion, killing one of the five crew.

March 12
A French Air Force Amiot AAC.1 crashed near Hoang Su Phi, Vietnam, killing all 23 on board.

July 9
French Navy Amiot AAC.1 1036/32 S-1 crashed off Zaouit Massa, Morocco, killing all 18 on board.

August 21
A Compagnie Aérienne de Transports Indochinois (CATI) Amiot AAC.1 (F-BANQ) crashed in the Red River near Lao Kay, Vietnam, killing three.

== 1950s ==
=== 1950 ===
18 January
Spanish Air Force CASA 352 T.2-143 struck the side of a mountain near Tobarra, Spain, killing all 16 on board.

22 May
A Bulgarian Air Force Ju 52/3m crashed into Mount Paskal after encountering a downdraft, killing six of the seven crew.

12 June
A French Air Force Ju 52/3m disappeared while on a flight over Madagascar from Antananarivo to Tamatave with 16 on board; the nine survivors were rescued three weeks later after two of them walked for two weeks to a nearby village.

23 July
Spanish Air Force CASA 352 T.2-167 was written off at an unknown location.

26 September
A Spanish Air Force CASA 352 crashed off Melilla Air Force Base, Spain, killing all five on board.

29 September
Spanish Air Force CASA 352 T.2-124 crashed at Galápagos, Spain, killing five of 17 on board.

18 December
Two French Air Force Ju 52s (328/F-RBEH and 384/F-RBDK) collided and crashed at Tourane (now Da Nang), Vietnam, killing some 30 people on board both aircraft.

22 December
A Spanish Air Force CASA 352 crashed and burned south of Antequera in the Sierra Tocal mountains, killing all five on board.

=== 1951 ===
6 February
Spanish Air Force CASA 352 T.2-47 crashed in the mountains near San Pablo de los Montes, killing all four on board.

18 April
Spanish Air Force CASA 352 T.2-141 was written off at an unknown location.

18 April
Spanish Air Force CASA 352 T.2-160 was written off at an unknown location.

9 May
Spanish Air Force CASA 352 T.2-93 crashed in the Petraza Mountains near Monterroso (Lugo) during a storm, killing all four on board.

26 June
Spanish Air Force CASA 352 T.2-114 crashed near Morón de la Fontera, killing all eight on board.

29 June
A Jugoslovenski Aerotransport (JAT) Amiot AAC.1 (YU-ACE) crashed near Rijeka, Yugoslavia, killing all 14 on board.

21 October
Spanish Air Force CASA 352 T.2-169 was written off at an unknown location.

=== 1952 ===
2 January
An Air France Amiot AAC.1 (F-BAMQ) crashed at Andapa, Madagascar, killing six of eleven on board.

5 December
An Air France Amiot AAC.1 (F-BANK) was written off at Antalaha-Antsirabato, Madagascar; there were no casualties.

=== 1953 ===
12 January
Spanish Air Force CASA 352 T.2-227 was written off at an unknown location.

17 March
Spanish Air Force CASA 352 T.2-185 was written off at an unknown location.

10 April
An Air France Amiot AAC.1 (F-BALE) crashed on takeoff from Miandrivazo Airport, killing all four on board.

12 November
A Lineas Aéreas del Estado (LADE) Ju 52/3msai (T-159, Rio Negro) collided in mid-air with Argentine Air Force de Havilland Dove T-62 near Villa Mugueta, Argentina, killing all 20 on board both aircraft.

12 December
An Aeronorte Ju 52/3m (PP-DZY) disappeared while operating a Vitoria to Rio de Janeiro cargo service; the wreckage was possibly located near Mogi das Cruzes (40 km (25 mi) east of São Paulo), but this was unlikely as the site was not on the aircraft's flight path.

=== 1954 ===
18 January
Spanish Air Force CASA 352 T.2B-145 was written off at an unknown location.

18 February
French Navy Ju 52 1015 / 4S-5 struck the side of a mountain near Zaghouan, Tunisia at night, killing all 15 on board.

25 August
Spanish Air Force CASA 352 T.2B-220 was written off at an unknown location.

29 August
Spanish Air Force CASA 352 T.2B-162 struck Pico la Braña following engine failure, killing all four on board.

16 September
A French Air Force AAC.1 struck a wooded mountainside near Mouzala, Algeria, killing all eight on board.

1 November
Spanish Air Force CASA 352 T.2-247 crashed 10 km (6.2 mi) south of Ronda, killing all 11 on board.

=== 1955 ===
10 March
Spanish Air Force CASA 352 T.2B-226 crashed at Jerez de la Frontera Air Base, killing one of eight on board.

20 May
Spanish Air Force CASA 352 T.2B-270 landed short of the runway at Suquez/Lérida and crashed in a ravine during an air festival; all six on board survived, but the aircraft was written off.

27 June
Spanish Air Force CASA 352 T.2B-268 crashed off Tétouan, Morocco in fog, killing two of four on board.

15 November
Spanish Air Force CASA 352 T.2-223 was written off at an unknown location.

2 December
Spanish Air Force CASA 352 T.2B-234 crashed at Montserrat, Spain, due to engine failure; all eight on board bailed out and survived.

7 December
Spanish Air Force CASA 352 T.2B-221 was written off at an unknown location.

20 December
Spanish Air Force CASA 352 T.2B-147 crashed near La Granja, Segovia, Spain, killing four of five on board.

=== 1957 ===
23 February
A VASP Ju 52/3m (PT-AUX) crashed in a field near Salesópolis, Brazil and burned out, killing all six on board.

8 May
Spanish Air Force CASA 352 T.2B-251 crashed near Sidi Ifni Airport, Morocco following an in-flight fire, killing 12 of 14 on board.

29 May
Spanish Air Force CASA 352 T.2B-271 struck a mountain near Aras de Alpuente in the Sierra de Javalambre mountain range, killing all eight on board.

3 July
Spanish Air Force CASA 352 T.2B-208 ditched off Rio Martil; the radio operator remains missing.

=== 1958 ===
2 April
A Transportes Aéreos Orientales (TAO) Ju 52/3m (HC-SND) crashed at Quito, Ecuador following engine problems, killing three of 14 on board.

=== 1959 ===
23 June
Spanish Air Force CASA 352 T.2B-239 was written off at an unknown location. On the same day Spanish Air Force CASA 352 T.2-136 was also written off at an unknown location.

29 September
Spanish Air Force CASA 352 T.2B-139 was written off at an unknown location.

== 1960s ==
=== 1960 ===
19 February
Spanish Air Force CASA 352 T.2B-204 was written off at an unknown location.

20 June
Spanish Air Force CASA 352 T.2B-252 was written off at an unknown location.

=== 1961 ===
6 April
Spanish Air Force CASA 352 T.2B-155 was written off at an unknown location.

17 November
Spanish Air Force CASA 352 T.2B-129 was written off at an unknown location.

=== 1962 ===
27 January
Spanish Air Force CASA 352 T.2B-258 was written off at an unknown location.

=== 1965 ===
8 June
Two Spanish Air Force CASA 352s (T.2B-229 and T.2B-230) were flying in formation with seven other aircraft during a paradrop exercise when they collided in mid-air near Alcantarilla Air Base, killing all 14 on board both aircraft.

=== 1966 ===
18 May
Spanish Air Force CASA 352 T.2B-266 was written off at an unknown location.

=== 1968 ===
6 July
Spanish Air Force CASA 352 T.2B-158 was written off at an unknown location.

19 December
Spanish Air Force CASA 352 T.2B-235 force-landed at Gran Tarajal, Fuerteventura, Spain, following center engine failure; all three on board survived, but the aircraft was written off.

=== 1969 ===
26 June
Spanish Air Force CASA 352 T.2B-191 was written off at an unknown location.

30 August
A Spanish Air Force CASA 352 was written off at Monte Vega, Dueñas, Spain, after a propeller separated; all four on board survived.

6 November
Spanish Air Force CASA 352 T.2B-133 was written off at an unknown location.

== 1970s and later ==
=== 1970 ===
28 August
Spanish Air Force CASA 352 T.2B-156 was written off at an unknown location.

=== 1971 ===
22 February
Spanish Air Force CASA 352 T.2B-157 was written off at an unknown location.

27 July
Spanish Air Force CASA 352 T.2B-198 was written off at an unknown location.

=== 1987 ===
29 May
A Ju-Air Ju 52/3m (HB-HOS) lost control during landing at Winningen Airport, Germany; after it bounced during a premature landing, the pilot attempted a go-around, but lost directional control and the right wing touched the ground, after which the aircraft veered right, rolled left and the left wing touched the ground and turned and stopped in a field. A small fire ignited on the right engine but was extinguished by the crew. All 20 on board survived. Crew errors and poor CRM were blamed. The aircraft was repaired and returned to service.

=== 1998 ===
11 February
Ju-Air Ju 52/3m (HB-HOS) left the runway while taxiing following landing at Samedan Airport, St. Moritz, Switzerland, breaking off the left main landing gear and damaging the left engine and left wing; all 20 on board survived. The aircraft had encountered wake turbulence (edge vortices) from its sister aircraft (HB-HOT, also a Ju 52) that had landed two minutes earlier.

=== 1999 ===
29 May
A Ju-Air CASA 352A-3 (HB-HOY) landed too late at Atterheide Airport and ran off the runway; there were no casualties and the aircraft suffered no damage.

=== 2001 ===
28 April
A Ju-Air CASA 352A-3 (HB-HOY) was blown off the runway while rolling to a stop after landing at Mönchengladbach Airport; there were no casualties and the aircraft suffered no damage.

=== 2005 ===
14 January
After a cold night in Switzerland, the wings and fuselage of Ju-Air CASA 352A-3 HB-HOY were covered in frost. The aircraft took off at a higher than planned speed, and due to the frost, the pilots found the aircraft difficult to control. After 15 minutes in the air, the pilots were able to regain control and the aircraft continued with no further incident.

=== 2006 ===
22 July
Ju-Air CASA 352A-3 HB-HOY suffered an engine fire while taxiing for takeoff from Schleissheim Airport, Germany; the aircraft was evacuated and the fire was extinguished by fire crews. The pilot had forgotten to activate the fire extinguishing system.

=== 2018 ===
4 August
A Ju-Air Ju 52/3mg4e (HB-HOT) crashed into Piz Segnas mountain, near Flims, Switzerland, while on a sightseeing tour from Locarno to Duebendorf. All twenty people on board were killed. The aircraft previously served with the Swiss Air Force from 1939 to 1985 with tail number A-702.
