= Moritzberg =

Moritzberg may refer to the following places in Germany:

- Moritzberg (Hildesheim), a part of Hildesheim, Lower Saxony
- Moritzberg (Röthenbach an der Pegnitz), a hamlet of Röthenbach an der Pegnitz
- Moritzberg (Franconian Jura), a mountain in the Franconian Jura, Bavaria
