= 2018 Ju-Air Junkers Ju 52 crash =

2018 aviation accident in Switzerland

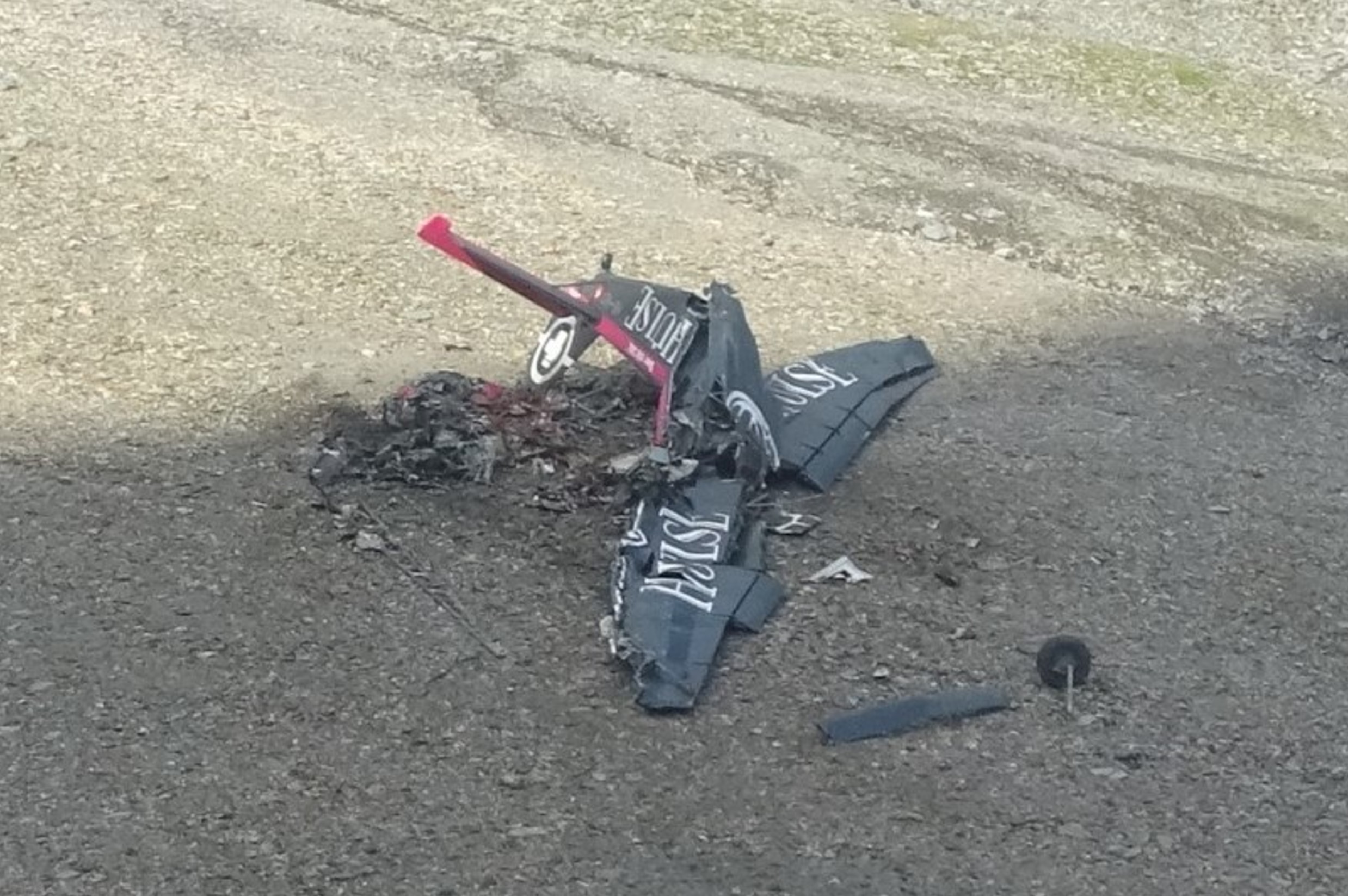
- Aerial view of the wreckage

Accident
- Date: 4 August 2018
- Summary: Stall and loss of control in hot and high conditions
- Site: Piz Segnas mountain, Glarus Alps, Switzerland; 46°53′57″N 09°13′45″E

Aircraft
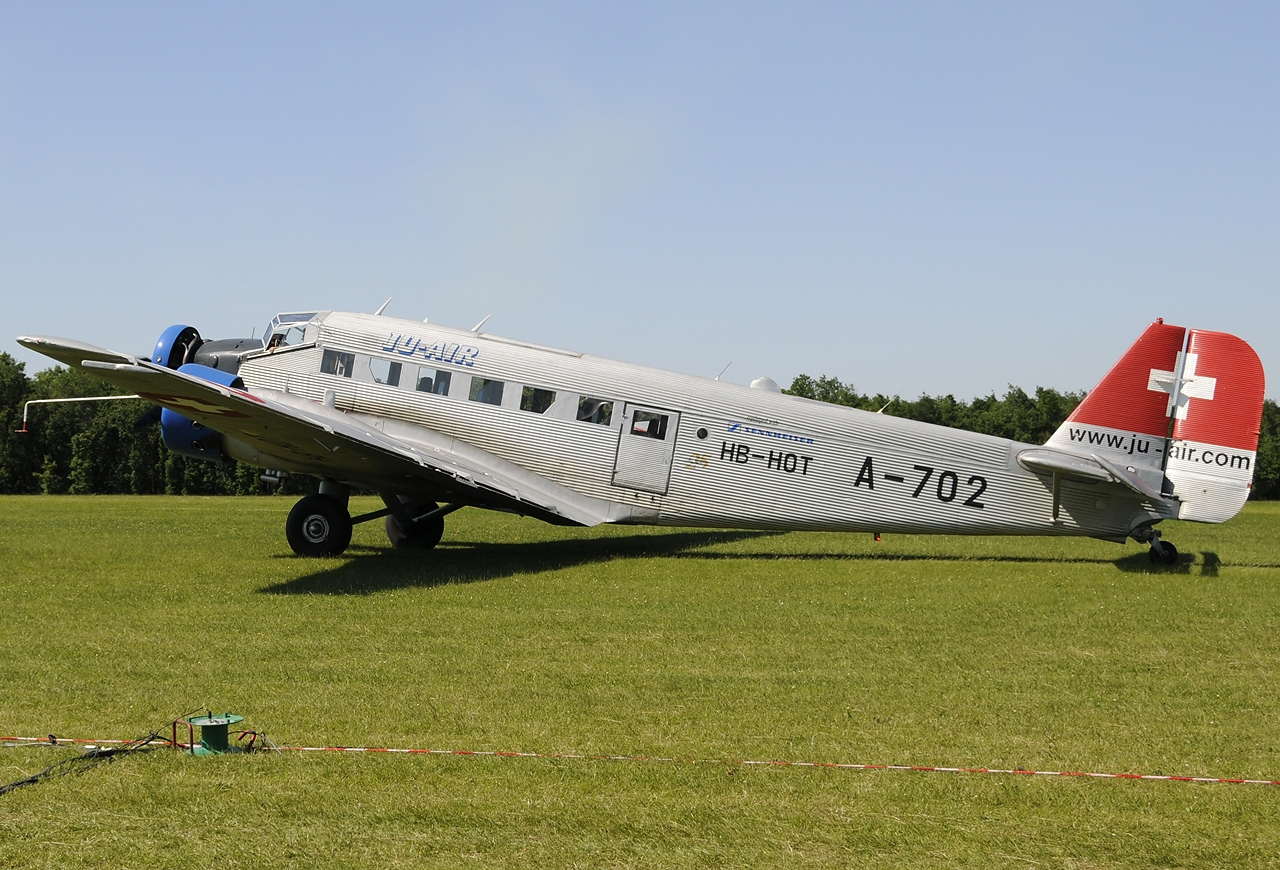
- HB-HOT, the Ju 52 involved in the accident, photographed in 2009 in a previous livery
- Aircraft type: Junkers Ju 52/3mg4e
- Operator: Ju-Air
- Registration: HB-HOT
- Flight origin: Locarno Airport, Locarno, Switzerland
- Destination: Dübendorf Air Base, Dübendorf, Switzerland
- Occupants: 20
- Passengers: 17
- Crew: 3
- Fatalities: 20
- Survivors: 0

On 4 August 2018, a Junkers Ju 52 passenger aircraft operated by Ju-Air crashed near Piz Segnas, Switzerland, while en route from Locarno to Dübendorf. All 20 people on board were killed.

It was the first fatal crash of a Ju-Air aircraft since the company began operations in 1982. The cause of the crash was investigated jointly by the Swiss Transportation Safety Investigation Board (STSB) and the cantonal police of Grisons on behalf of the federal and cantonal prosecutors' offices.

The final STSB report on the accident, released on 28 January 2021, indicated that the accident was caused by the two highly experienced pilots flying recklessly, disregarding regulations, failing to anticipate expected turbulence, and failing to control the aircraft to prevent it from stalling and spinning into the ground. The report also found that the aircraft was not airworthy at the time of flight, in that the engines were not producing their minimum rated power, and that the company had a deficient safety culture of rule breaking.

== Aircraft ==
The aircraft involved was a tri-motor Junkers Ju 52/3mg4e, registration HB-HOT, msn 6595. It had served with the Swiss Air Force from 1939 to 1985, when it was acquired by the Association of the Friends of the Swiss Air Force (German: Verein der Freunde der Schweizerischen Luftwaffe), which operated under the name Ju-Air, a company that offers sightseeing flights on vintage aircraft and had logged 10,000 hours of flight time. Ownership of the aircraft remained with the Swiss Air Force. It had been used in the films Where Eagles Dare (1968), and Valkyrie (2008) and the 2012 German movie Fly Away. The aircraft had been issued with a certificate of airworthiness by the Federal Office of Civil Aviation (FOCA) on 6 April 2018, valid for two years.

== Passengers and crew ==
The aircraft was carrying three crew and seventeen passengers, all Swiss apart from an Austrian couple and their son. Nine were women and eleven were men.

On the day of the crash, the Junkers was piloted by two veteran captains, aged 62 and 63. Both had extensive experience as pilots for Swissair, Swiss, and Edelweiss, as well as more than 30 years of militia service with the Swiss Air Force. Both had several hundred flight hours' worth of experience with the Ju 52. The third crew member was a 66-year-old flight attendant with 40 years of professional experience.

== Accident ==
The aircraft was flying from Locarno Airport to Dübendorf Air Base, on the return leg of a two-day trip. The weather was unseasonably warm with choppy winds. It took off from Locarno's Runway 26R at 16:14 local time, bound for Dübendorf under visual flight rules (VFR). After reaching Lake Maggiore and commencing an 180 degree turn, the aircraft flew above the Blenio Valley and steadily gained altitude.

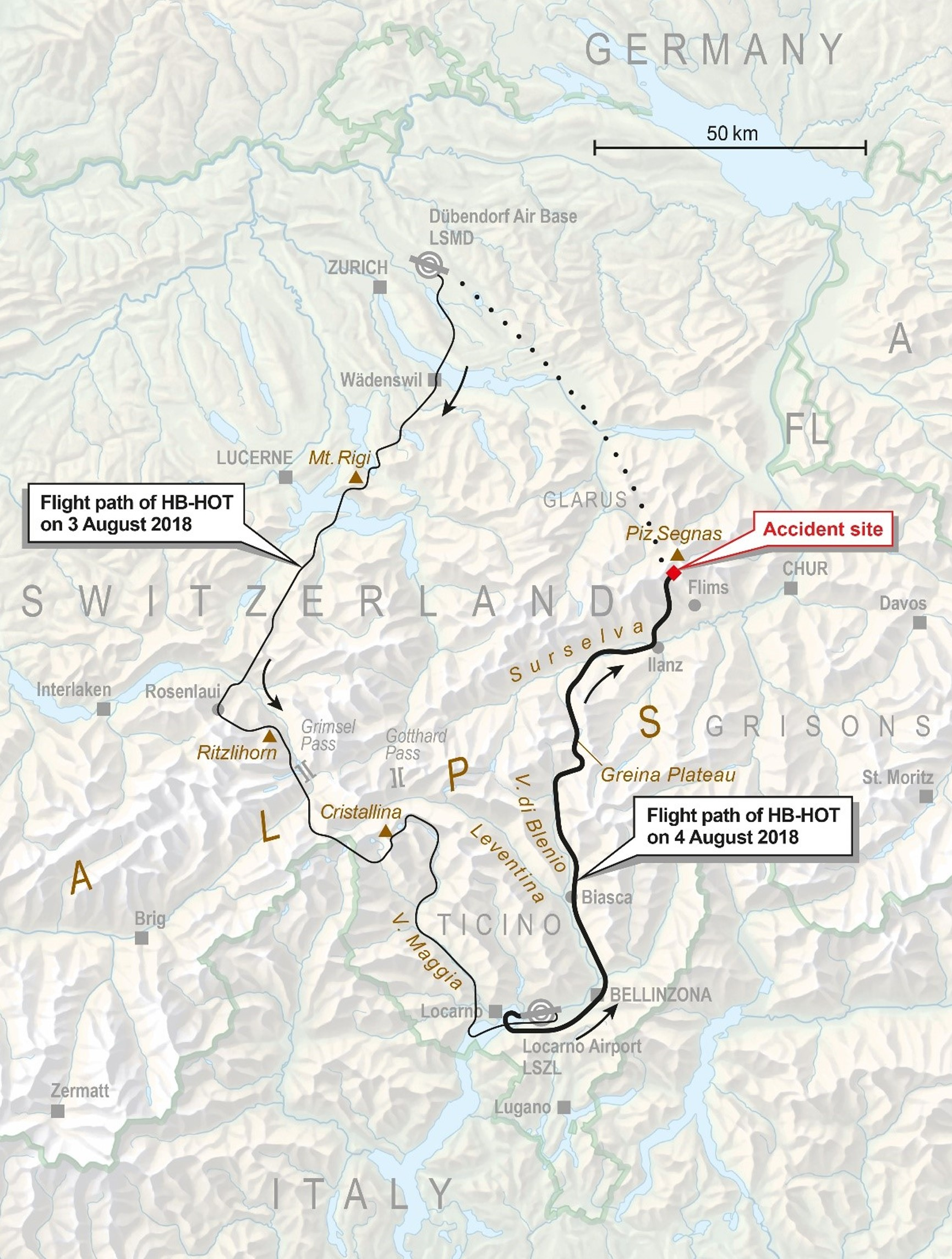
Flight path of HB-HOT on 3 August, the day before the accident, and 4 August, the day of the accident

The aircraft continued to follow its scenic route until it arrived at a basin southwest of Piz Segnas. It entered the basin through the west-side and continued to climb, reaching an altitude of 2,833 metres (9,295 ft). As it reached the mountains, the crew gave announcements over the speakers regarding the scenery. At the time, the aircraft was flying at a ground speed of 165 km/h (89 kn; 103 mph). It was lowered to 135 km/h (73 kn; 84 mph) before gradually increasing to 200 km/h (110 kn; 120 mph). Meanwhile, the altitude kept decreasing.

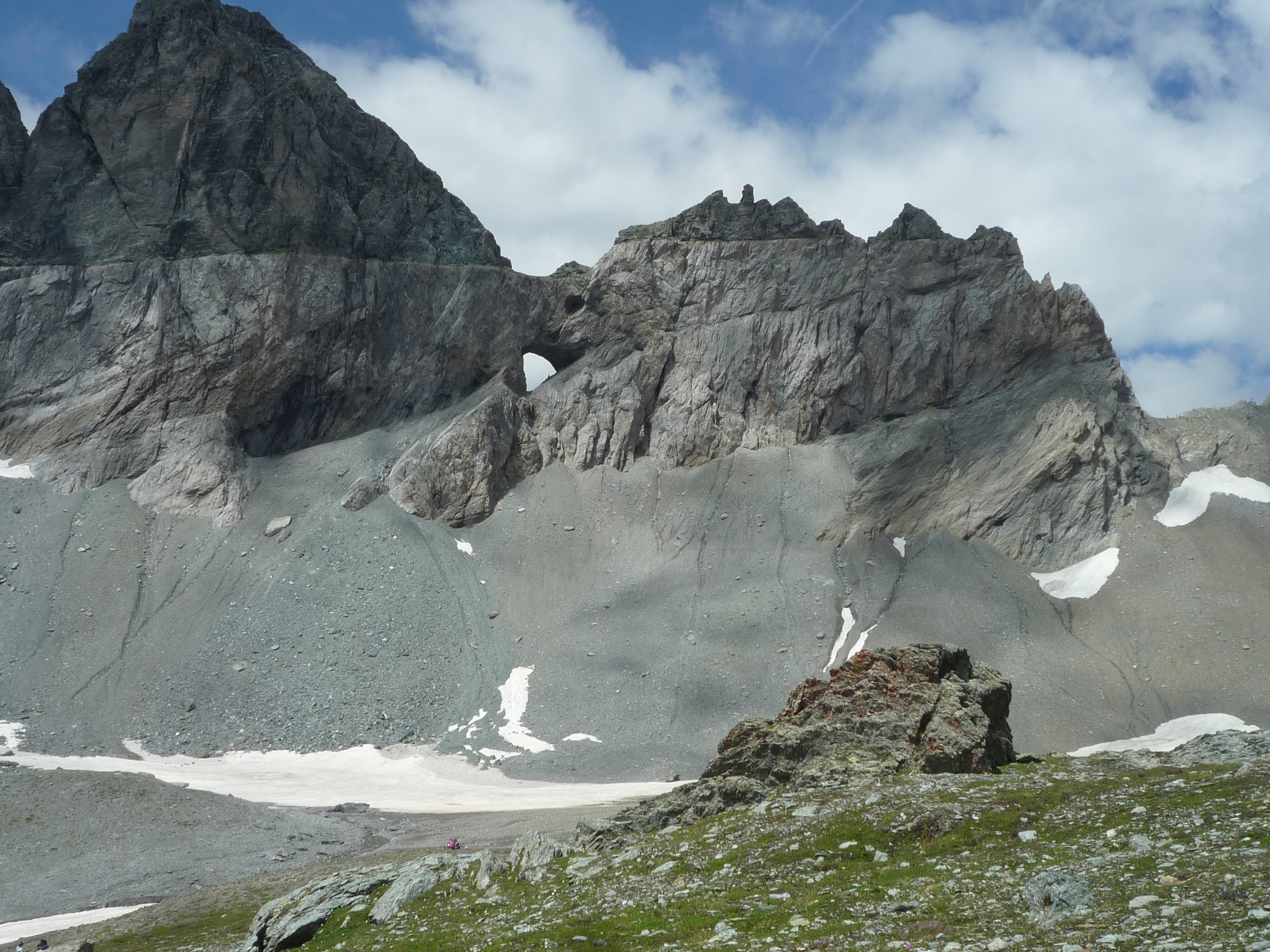
The Tschingelhörner mountain ridge looking northwest, with the Martinsloch hole (centre) and Segnas Pass (right). The Ju 52 crashed on the plateau below.

The flight eventually flew past the Tschingelhörner peaks and continued to fly towards the Martinsloch, a rock window gaping at the ridges nearby. The crew intended to fly near the hole to entertain the tourists. As the altitude was reduced, the propellers slowed down and the pitch began to increase. The aircraft started to turn to the right towards the Martinsloch.

A video taken by one of the passengers showed that after initiating the turn the aircraft slightly tilted to the left. The altitude continued to drop as well as the airspeed, while the pitch began to increase. The left bank angle also began to gradually increase. Several seconds later, mild shaking was felt throughout the aircraft. The aircraft suddenly banked hard to the left. Despite the pilots' efforts to recover from the stall, the aircraft kept losing airspeed. The bank angle deepened to a point where the bank was at 68 degrees downwards. It eventually entered a dive in nearly inverted condition.

At 16:56 local time (14:56 UTC), the Junkers crashed into Piz Segnas mountain, at an elevation of 2,540 metres (8,330 ft) and a speed of 200 km/h (110 kn; 120 mph) at an almost vertical angle. All 20 people on board were killed.

=== Immediate aftermath ===
Hiking routes and the local airspace were closed off for the duration of the recovery operation, which involved five helicopters.

Ju-Air suspended all flights by its other Ju 52 aircraft for two weeks, until they resumed operations on 17 August under stricter conditions.

== Investigation ==
Video of the crash
- Video of the crash captured by a nearby hiker (from local TV report, in German)

The accident was investigated jointly by the Swiss Transportation Safety Investigation Board (STSB) and the cantonal police of Grisons on behalf of the federal and cantonal prosecutors' offices.

A spokesperson for the STSB said that the Junkers "fell like a stone to the ground", and that the heatwave in Europe could have been a factor in the crash, as heat reduces an aircraft's climb performance. The police indicated that no distress signal was received from the aircraft prior to the crash. Investigators ruled out a collision with a cable or another aircraft, and said that there was no indication of foul play or the aircraft losing parts before the crash. The aircraft was not fitted with any flight recorders, as they were not required due to the age of the aircraft. Investigators hoped to find some relevant information from passengers' personal photographic and video recordings during the sightseeing flight. The STSB issued its preliminary report on 15 August 2018. An intermediate report was issued on 20 November 2018, citing anterior corrosion marks and cracks, not related to the accident, which effectively grounded the two remaining Ju-52 of Ju-Air (HB-HOP and HB-HOS) until further investigation of these airframe and engine issues.

In August the SonntagsZeitung newspaper published excerpts from a leaked draft of the investigation report, which said: the pilots flew into a high-altitude alpine valley without a safe possibility of turning back; the accident pilots were already known for questionable decisions; and even on check flights, one of the pilots ignored the minimum altitudes. Other causes such as technical failures had been ruled out.

=== Cause of stall ===
The investigation confirmed that the aircraft crashed onto the plateau due to stall, which happened due to multiple factors including inappropriate decisions that had been made by the crew and were aggravated by the hot and high condition. Environmental factors played a big role in the crash as the crew's intention to take the scenic route, which involved flying near the Piz Segnas, caused changes on the external condition that threatened the safety of the flight. The decision to fly through the risky route, however, was already shaped by the lack of safety culture and routine violations by the crew and the company itself.

The crew wanted the passengers to get a clearer view of the terrain. To do that, the crew had to lower their altitude and by doing so the necessary distance between the aircraft and the ground for a recovery became limited, hence it became a safety risk. The pilots also decreased their airspeed, flying merely at 100 kn (190 km/h; 120 mph). The clear sky condition and high elevation of the area also altered the aircraft's performance due to the lowered air density. While the aircraft neared terrain, the flight encountered turbulence, a common phenomenon in mountains. Included in the turbulence were updrafts and downdrafts which would significantly affect the aircraft's angle of attack.

During the turbulence, the aircraft was struck by a downdraft which pushed the nose down, causing the aircraft to lose its altitude. The crew then tried to stop the descent by making a nose up input. The pitch eventually stayed above flight level, however, the downdraft suddenly dissipated seconds later. The pilots had been trying to arrest their descent by making a nose up input and the sudden updraft caused the aircraft to pitch up, affecting the airspeed by decreasing it to a level dangerously close to the aircraft's stall speed. As the aircraft was turning to the left when it was struck by the updraft, added by the low speed and the design of the aircraft, the left wing stalled and caused the aircraft to bank heavily towards the left.

Recognizing the situation, the crew tried to recover the aircraft by intuitively turning towards the left. The move might seem counterintuitive, but investigators noted that with the design of Ju-Air Junkers, this was the correct procedure. However, the limited distance between the aircraft and the ground rendered the recovery near impossible. The crew couldn't conduct the proper procedure and the stall eventually went out of control. By that point recovery was impossible.

=== Safety violations ===
The crew's decision to fly above the basin with numerous safety risks raised questions about the safety culture of the pilots and the operator. A deeper investigation uncovered several findings about the conduct of the pilots on previous flights, which showed that they had flown recklessly multiple times. Pilot A was noted to have been repeatedly violating the safety altitude by flying the aircraft lower than it was supposed to be, which was dismissed by his instructor who later graded him as "standard". The same applied to pilot B who flew it dangerously low but was graded as "high standard".

Further investigation concluded that pilots had frequently disregarded rules and instead flew their respective aircraft at high risk. At one point, the aircraft flew so dangerously low that it nearly collided with hikers beneath them, who managed to take a photograph of the looming aircraft. Radar data analysis made from 216 flights from April to August 2018 revealed that more than a third of those flights had been operated under high-risk conditions, several of which were noted as being in "very high risk." Both pilots of the crashed aircraft were among the worst offenders, as the number of flights that could be categorized as high-risk was twice as high as the average.

The existing regulation from EASA outlined that the Ju-Air Junkers Ju 52 were obliged to fly with a minimum distance of 2,000 feet (610 m) above any terrain within 5 nautical miles (9.3 km; 5.8 mi) of the route. And since the pilots were also obliged to take a possible engine failure into account and because above 2,500 metres (8,200 ft), the Ju 52 is no longer able to climb with an engine failure, the minimum altitude had to be at least 2,000 feet (610 m) above any terrain close to the flight path, which in this case would have forced the crew to fly approximately at an altitude of 12,500 feet (3,800 m). However, the operator of the aircraft ordered the crew not to fly the aircraft above 10,000 feet (3,000 m) since doing so would cause discomfort to the occupants as the aircraft was not equipped with pressurization. So, the crew decided to adhere to the company's rules and flew below 10,000 feet (3,000 m).

Following the discovery of pilots flying aircraft at high risk, investigators managed to identify the factors that caused such disregard for safety. One of the main reasons was the employment of pilots from the Swiss Air Force, which constituted a majority of the pilots. Pilots from the Air Force were more likely to take larger risks due to lax regulations in that military branch. The other factor was the lack of rules regarding the operation of vintage aircraft and overlook from the local aviation authority regarding compliance with existing regulations.

As the investigation progressed, more deficiencies were found in multiple areas of operation within the airline. The investigation revealed that there had been repeated miscalculations regarding the aircraft's weight, which caused shifting in the aircraft's center of gravity. This condition was also cited as a possible contributing factor to the aircraft stalling. Inspection on the maintenance shed light on the poor servicing of the aircraft as the involved one was found with extensive corrosion and cracks. There was no documentation of any major overhaul, and spare parts had to be fabricated since the manufacturer of the aircraft was no longer producing Junkers Ju-52.

Following a review in March 2019, while the accident investigation was still ongoing, Swiss's Federal Office of Civil Aviation (FOCA) banned Ju-Air from conducting commercial passenger flights with Ju 52s, allowing only private flights for club members. Later, the operating and maintenance licenses were revoked for the other Swiss-based Ju 52 aircraft, effectively grounding the HB-HOP and HB-HOS sister aircraft. FOCA deemed them unsafe to fly due to the maintenance issues found in the HB-HOT wreck, such as fatigue cracks, corrosion, and sub-standard repair work.

=== Oversight failure ===
Despite numerous safety violations found within the airline, FOCA, the body that was responsible for the oversight of the airline, wasn't able to identify problems within the management. Corrective actions were not taken by the airline and FOCA was noted for being unable to execute its authority.

The investigation found that there was miscategorization regarding the operation of Junkers Ju-52 by FOCA. As the aircraft was categorized within the same class as "standard" aircraft instead of "historic" aircraft, the inspector from FOCA who was not accustomed to such vintage aircraft could not comprehend the area of operation for the Junkers Ju-52. Several deficiencies were actively dismissed by inspectors from FOCA, including the miscalculation of the basic empty mass which contributed to the shift in the aircraft's center of gravity. The report noted that at one point the crew did fly the aircraft in high-risk conditions such as proximity with terrain, however, the inspector did not report any fault and dismissed the finding. The internal safety management of the airline was also deemed inadequate as it didn't issue any corrective measures regarding high-risk flights that had been happening for years.

FOCA's inability to identify and rectify any shortcomings from the airline as well as its inability to enact its authority over the misconduct were eventually listed as a systemic contributing factor that enabled the crash.

=== Conclusion ===
Summary of investigation
- Summary of investigation and explanatory video animation by the STSB on YouTube

On 28 January 2021, a final report was released by the STSB which stated that "the pilots' high-risk flying was a direct cause of the accident", and that "the flight crew piloted the aircraft, at low altitude, with no possibility of an alternative flight path and at an airspeed that was dangerously low for the circumstances. The high-risk manner of flying through these not unusual turbulences caused the pilot to lose control of the aircraft. The aircraft was also being operated with its centre of gravity in excess of its rear limit". The STSB found that the aircraft was not in an airworthy condition when it took off on the accident flight, in that the engines had not been properly maintained and were not producing rated power. The report indicated that the company had a poor safety culture that tolerated risky behaviour and rule breaking.

== See also ==
- List of accidents and incidents involving the Junkers Ju 52
- List of airworthy Ju 52s
