= Sidi Ifni Airport =

Sidi Ifni Airport مطار سيدي إيفني
- IATA: SII; ICAO: GMMF

Summary
- Airport type: Public
- Location: Sidi Ifni, Morocco
- Elevation AMSL: 190 ft / 58 m
- Coordinates: 29°22′08″N 010°10′49″W

Map
- Location of airport in Morocco

Runways
Direction	Length		Surface
Direction	m	ft	Surface
	1,000	3,281

Sidi Ifni Airport (Arabic: مطار سيدي إيفني) (IATA: SII, ICAO: GMMF) was an airport serving Sidi Ifni, a city in the Guelmim-Oued Noun region in Morocco.

This airport closed in 1969 when the Spanish left the region, it is now partly desert and gravel parking.

== Airlines and destinations ==
The airport is not open for any commercial flights. It is closed due to the runway being in bad conditions.

== Facilities ==
The airport resided at an elevation of 190 feet (58 m) above mean sea level. It had one runway that was 1,000 metres (3,281 ft) long.
