= Risvik =

Risvik is a surname. Notable people with the surname include:

- Kari Risvik (1932–2021), Norwegian translator
- Kjell Risvik (1941–2021), Norwegian translator
- Per Risvik (1937–2023), Norwegian politician
