= Moritzberg (Franconian Jura) =

Mountain in Bavaria, Germany

- Location within Bavaria

Highest point
- Elevation: 603.5 m (1,980 ft)
- Isolation: 9.37 km (5.82 mi) to Arzberg
- Coordinates: 49°27′57″N 11°18′44″E

Geography
- Location: Bavaria, Germany
- Parent range: Franconian Jura

Moritzberg is a mountain of Bavaria, Germany. It is part of the Franconian Jura range.
