= Memmingen Airport =

International airport in Bavaria, Germany

Memmingen Airport Flughafen Memmingen
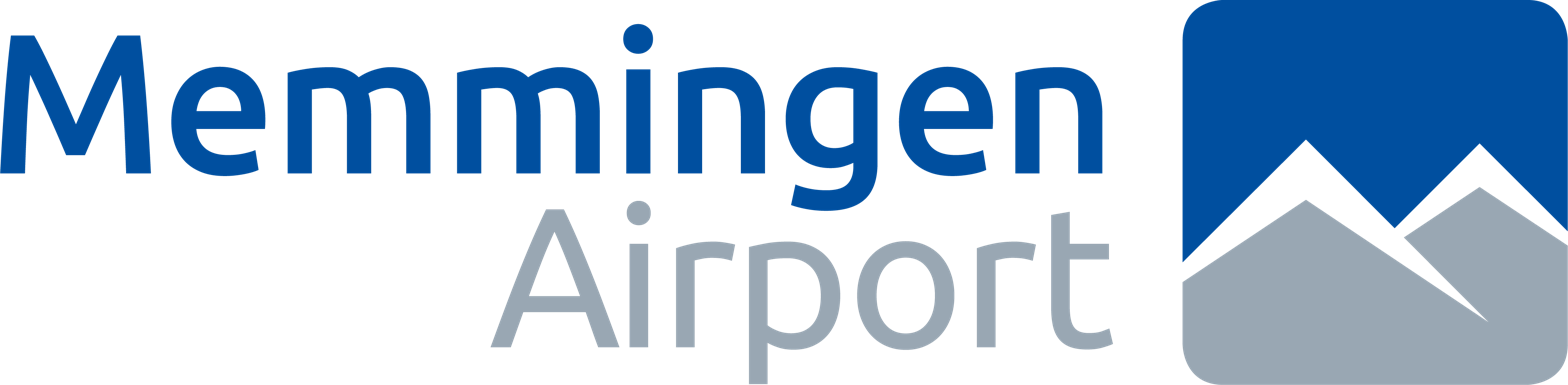

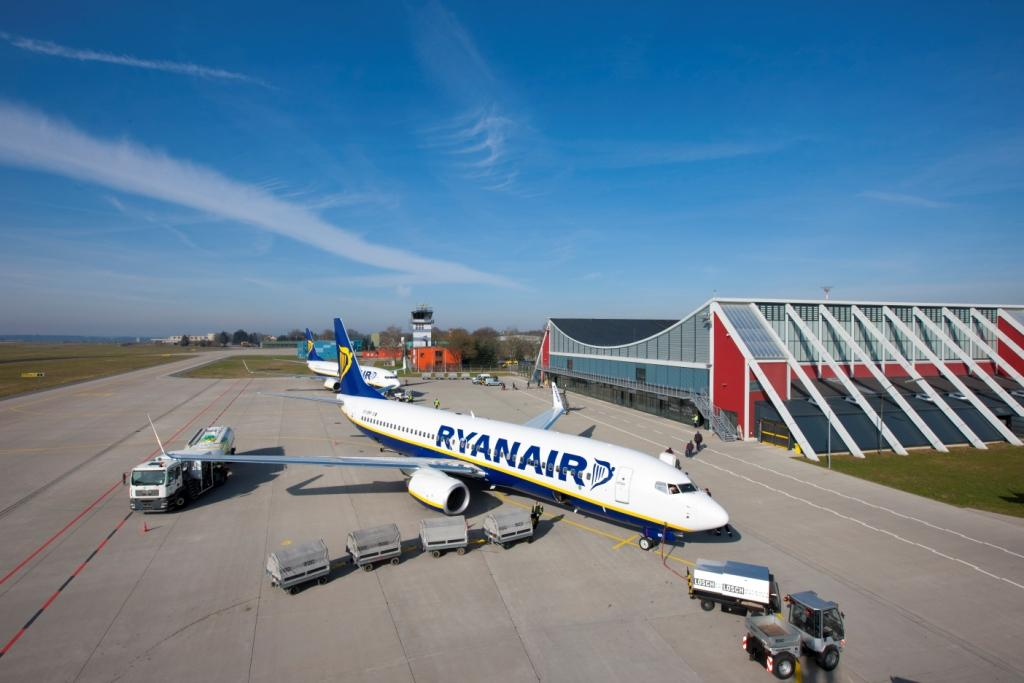
- IATA: FMM; ICAO: EDJA

Summary
- Airport type: Public
- Serves: Memmingen and the Allgäu
- Location: Memmingerberg
- Focus city for: Ryanair; Wizz Air
- Elevation AMSL: 633 m (2,077 ft)
- Coordinates: 47°59′33″N 10°14′37″E
- Website: memmingen-airport.com

Map
- Location of the airport in Bavaria FMM (Germany)

Runways
Direction	Length		Surface
Direction	m	ft	Surface
06/24	2,981	9,777	Asphalt

Statistics (2025)
- Passengers: 3,698,900 ▲+13,9%
- Aircraft movements: 33,200 ▲+11,6%
- Sources: Statistics at ADV. AIP at German air traffic control.

Memmingen Airport (IATA: FMM, ICAO: EDJA), also known as Allgäu Airport Memmingen, is an international airport in the town of Memmingerberg near Memmingen, in Bavaria, Germany. It is the least busy of the three commercial airports in the state after Munich Airport and Nuremberg Airport.

It was built in 1935 and housed the third group of Kampfgeschwader 255 until the airport was destroyed in 1944. From 1959 to 2003, it was the home base of German Air Force Jagdbombergeschwader 34 ("Allgäu"), which flew the F-84F Thunderstreak, from 1964 onward the F-104 Starfighter and from 1987 the Tornado IDS. Besides its conventional mission the squadron also had a nuclear mission, as part of NATOs nuclear deterrence until nuclear weapons were moved to other locations in Germany in 1996 and the airport was closed in 2003.

Since 2004, it has been serving Memmingen and the Allgäu as a civilian airport, though its catchment area covers a much wider range of places such as Augsburg, Lake Constance, and western Austria. It provides a low-cost alternative to Munich Airport. It serves as a base for Ryanair and features flights to European leisure and some metropolitan destinations and handled 3.2 million passengers in 2024.

== Geography ==
The Allgäu Airport Memmingen, is located in the town of Memmingerberg near Memmingen, the third-largest city in the Swabia region of Bavaria, Germany, about 3.8 km (2.4 mi) from the centre of Memmingen and 110 km (68 mi) from the city centre of Munich. It has the highest altitude of any commercial airport in Germany.

== History ==
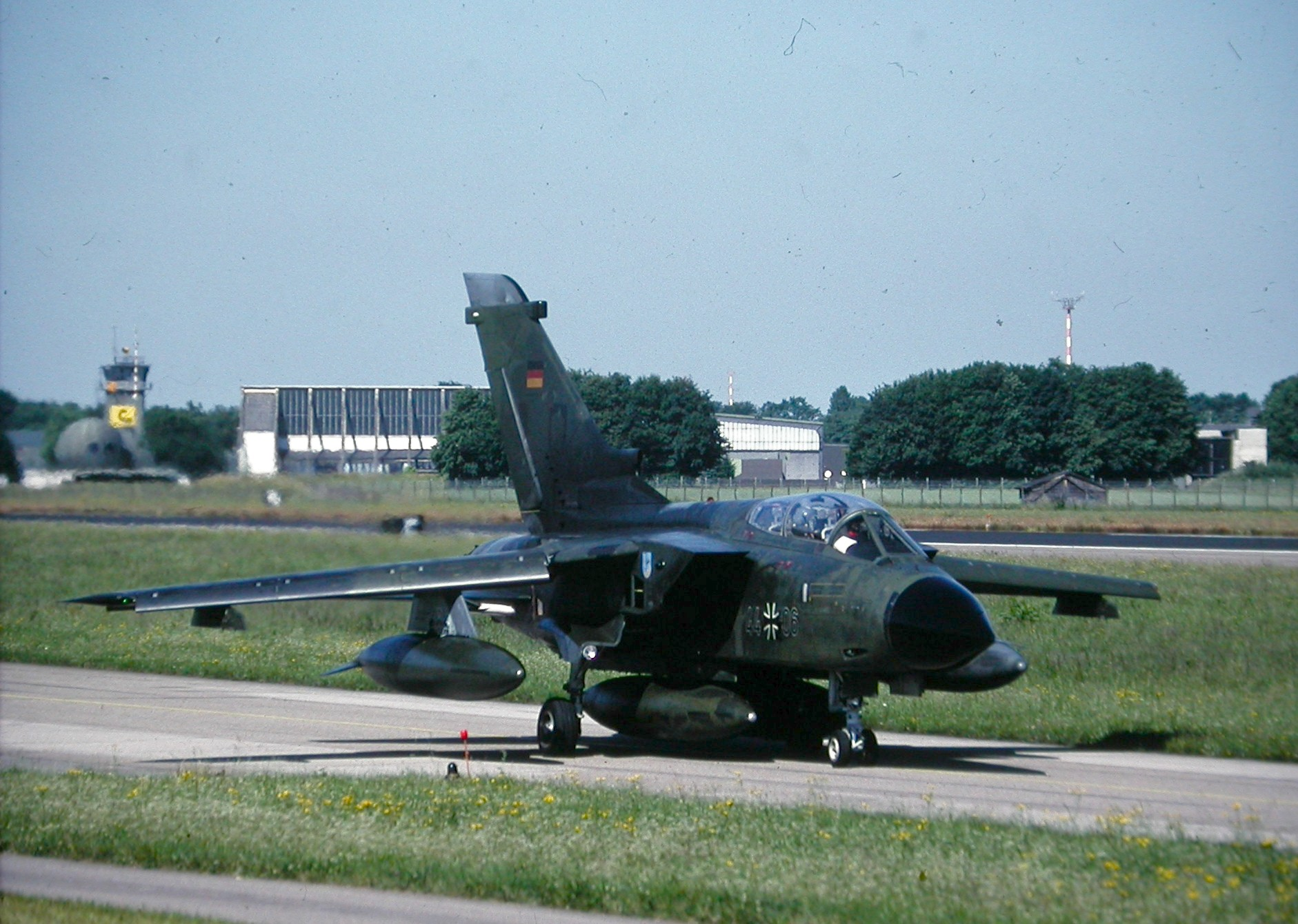
The former military airfield in 2000 with the hangar visible in the background being today's passenger terminal.

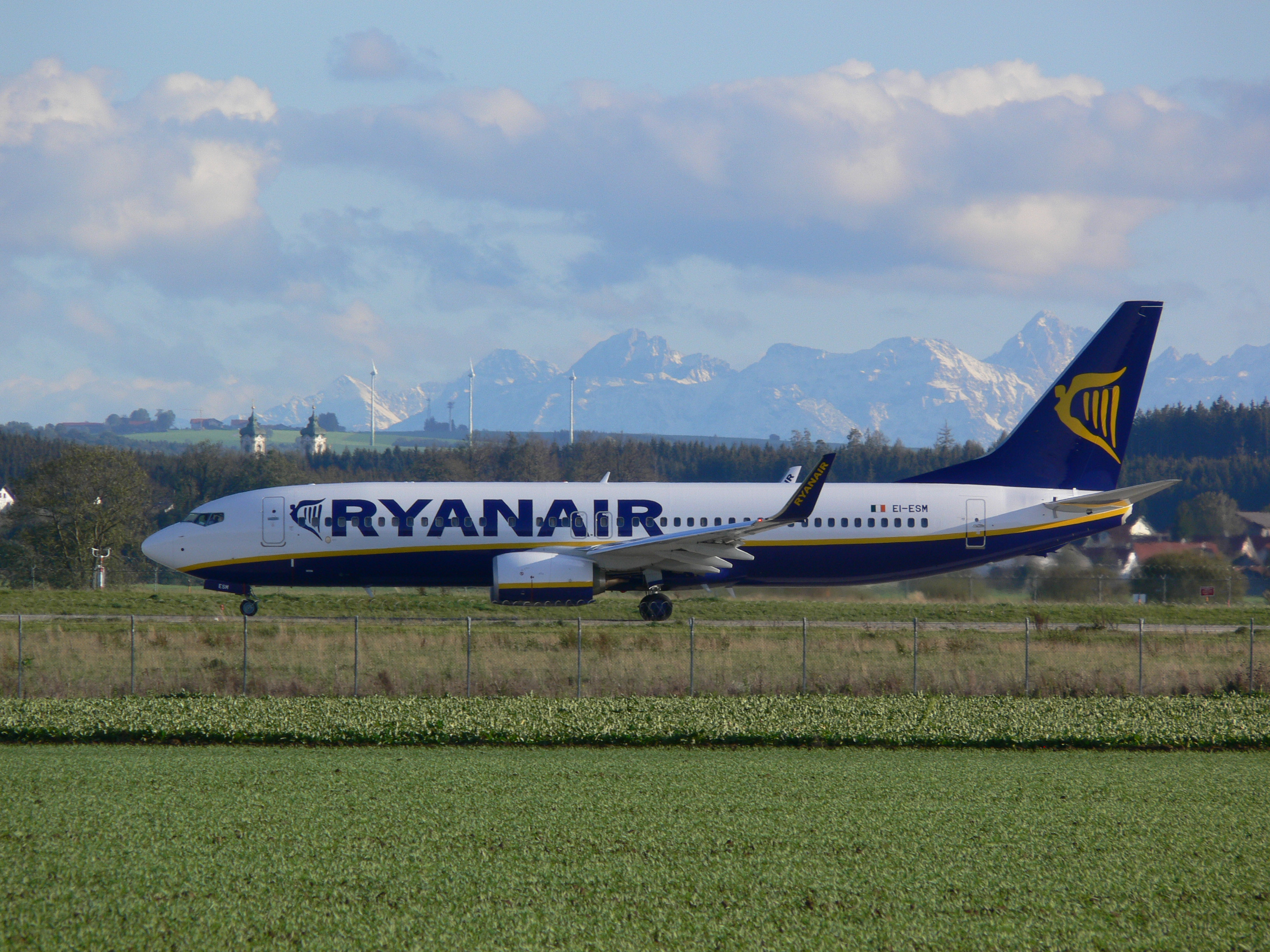
Ryanair Boeing 737–800 at Memmingen Airport with the Bavarian Alps visible in the background

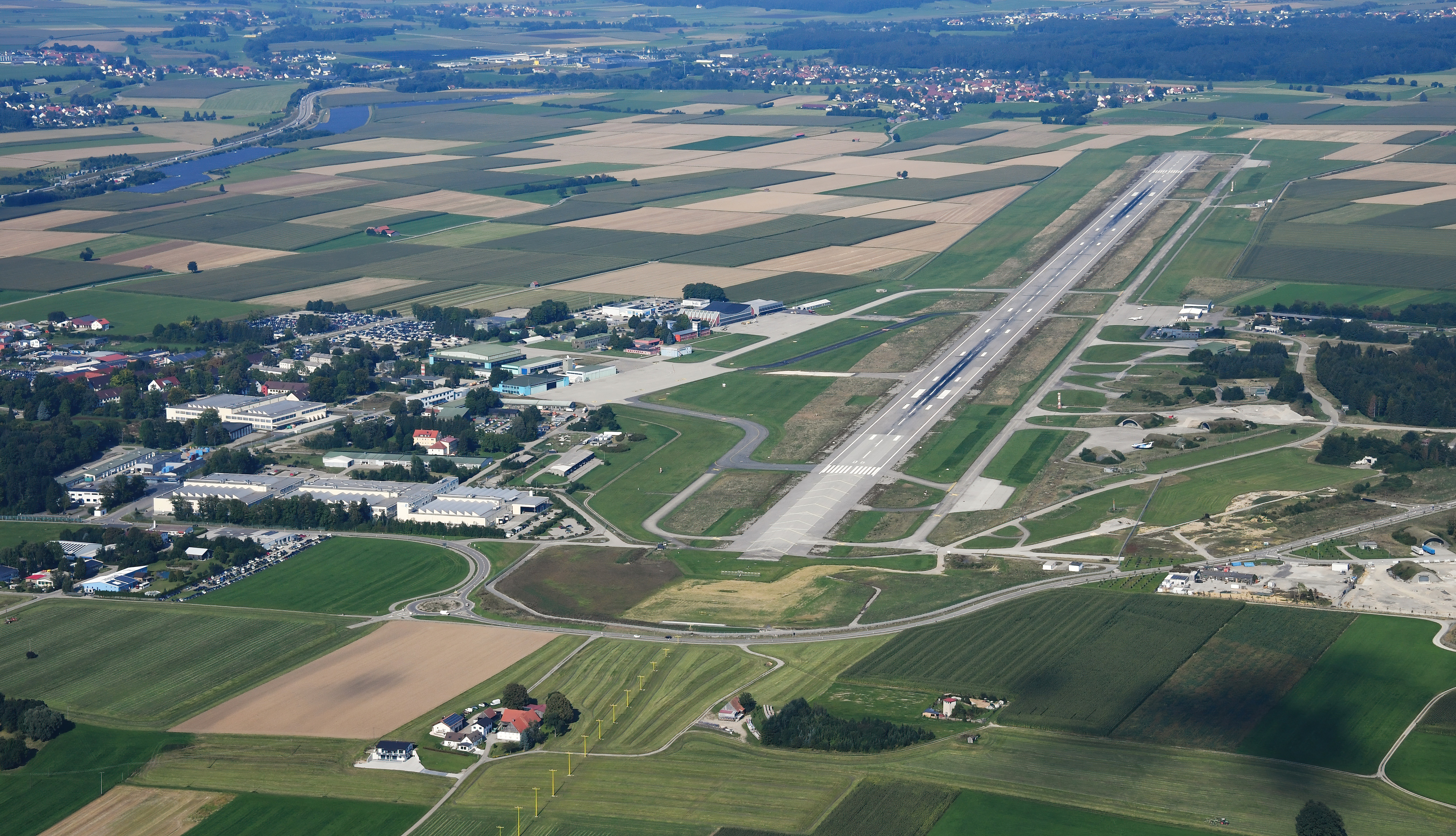
Aerial view of Memmingen Airport

=== Military use (20th century) ===
A military airfield was built at Memmingerberg in 1935. Starting March 1937, it housed the third group of Kampfgeschwader 255, later renamed Kampfgeschwader 51, flying Dornier Do 17 and Heinkel He 111H-20 during World War II. The airport was destroyed during an attack in March 1944 and bombed again in July 1944 and April 1945.

After World War II, the former airport served as a refugee camp. In 1954, the US allied forces declared it as a training ground. From 1955, the runway, halls and buildings were rebuilt, and the US Air Force used it for training flights from 1956 onward.

From 1959 to 2003, it was the home base of German Air Force Jagdbombergeschwader 34 ("Allgäu"). The JaboG 34 first flew the F-84F Thunderstreak, from 1964 onward the F-104 Starfighter and from 1987 the PA 200 Tornado. The squadron had a conventional and a nuclear mission, as part of NATOs nuclear deterrence: The "S" security squadron was required to guard the nuclear weapons depot and the ready-to-take-off, loaded alarm aircraft in the Quick Reaction Alert. The 7261st munitions squadron of the USAF was responsible for the weapons with over 100 personnel stationed in their own barracks, housing estate, with their own care facilities and school. In light of post-Cold War reduction of troop sizes and military infrastructure, it was decided to close the military airfield end of 2000. On 31 December 2002, operations were officially suspended, in June 2003 it was decommissioned and on 31 March 2004 it was closed. It was decided as a part of the proposed peace dividend to convert it to civilian uses.

=== 2004–2009 ===
On 28 June 2007, TUIfly started offering domestic flights to Berlin, Hamburg, and Cologne, and also flights to holiday destinations such as Palma de Mallorca, Heraklion, Naples, Rome, Venice, and Antalya. In March 2009, Ryanair announced seven new routes serving Memmingen starting May 2009.

=== Since 2010 ===
From May 2010, Ryanair operated 14 routes to and from Memmingen. Wizz Air also started serving Memmingen and has established eight routes since then. On 24 October 2013, Ryanair announced a new seasonal service to Shannon, while Palermo was added as a destination from the summer season of 2015. On 5 June 2014, the airport welcomed its five-millionth passenger.

In December 2014, InterSky announced that it would be taking over the domestic flights from Memmingen to Berlin and Hamburg by 1 March 2015, as Germanwings had announced that it would cease the same services just a few days earlier. In earlier years, these routes had already been unsuccessfully served by TUIfly, Air Berlin, and Avanti Air. In May 2015, InterSky announced that it would have a presence at Memmingen Airport by October 2015 consisting of one aircraft, adding a new route to Cologne and increasing frequencies on the already existing services to Berlin and Hamburg. Later, that plan was changed to a triangular route of Friedrichshafen – Memmingen – Cologne/Bonn was to be established instead of basing an aircraft in Memmingen. However, on 6 November 2015, InterSky ceased all operations due to financial difficulties, leaving Memmingen again without any domestic connections.

For the 2015 summer schedule, Wizz Air announced that it would expand its commitment and serve the cities of Tuzla in Bosnia and Herzegovina, the Bulgarian city of Sofia and the Lithuanian capital Vilnius.

In March 2017, Ryanair announced plans to establish its second Bavarian base (after Nuremberg Airport) in Memmingen from October 2017 consisting of one aircraft and seven additional routes. On 31 March 2019, another Ryanair aircraft was stationed in Memmingen and the workforce was increased to 70 employees. In December 2017, Memmingen Airport received its safety certification by the European Aviation Safety Agency. 2017 has been announced the first business year in which the airport achieved a profit at year end since the start of public services. In August 2018, the airport announced the schedule for its planned expansion which will take place from September 2018 until 2020. While the runway will be widened and its guidance system and lightning upgraded, the luggage facilities will see an expansion.

On 6 December 2018, the 10 millionth passenger was welcomed. In early 2019 the planned expansion works began to widen the runway and expand the handling facilities with the airport being closed for several weeks in September of the same year. The widened and refurbished runway has been inaugurated on 1 October 2019.

On 20 October 2022, Ryanair announced it would base an additional aircraft at Memmingen Airport, making a total of three Boeing 737 aircraft based at the airport. This would boost the number of destinations Ryanair serves from Memmingen to twenty-two.

In 2023, the airport served over 2.8 million passengers, a sharp increase of 42% over 2022 and an all-time record for the airport. Following this news, the airport's management announced plans to expand the main terminal.

In March 2024, Ryanair announced it would base an additional aircraft at Memmingen Airport, making a total of four Boeing 737 aircraft (part of the Malta Air subsidiary) based at the airport. This allowed for extra frequencies on popular routes.

In March 2025, the construction for a vast terminal expansion including an enlarged second floor for an extra two extra gates and expanded security were announced. This announcement also included plans for the extension of Apron 1. The newly built taxiway for all-weather operations has already been in operation. Other planned expansion projects involve roofing of the southern balcony in 2025, optimisation of the arrivals area with a separate arrivals exit in 2026, as well as the construction of a multi-story parking garage.

In December 2025, to combat strong demand, Ryanair announced it would station an additional aircraft at Memmingen Airport, making a total of five Boeing 737 aircraft (2x Boeing 737 MAX 8-200 and 3x Boeing 737-800) based at the airport.

== Facilities ==
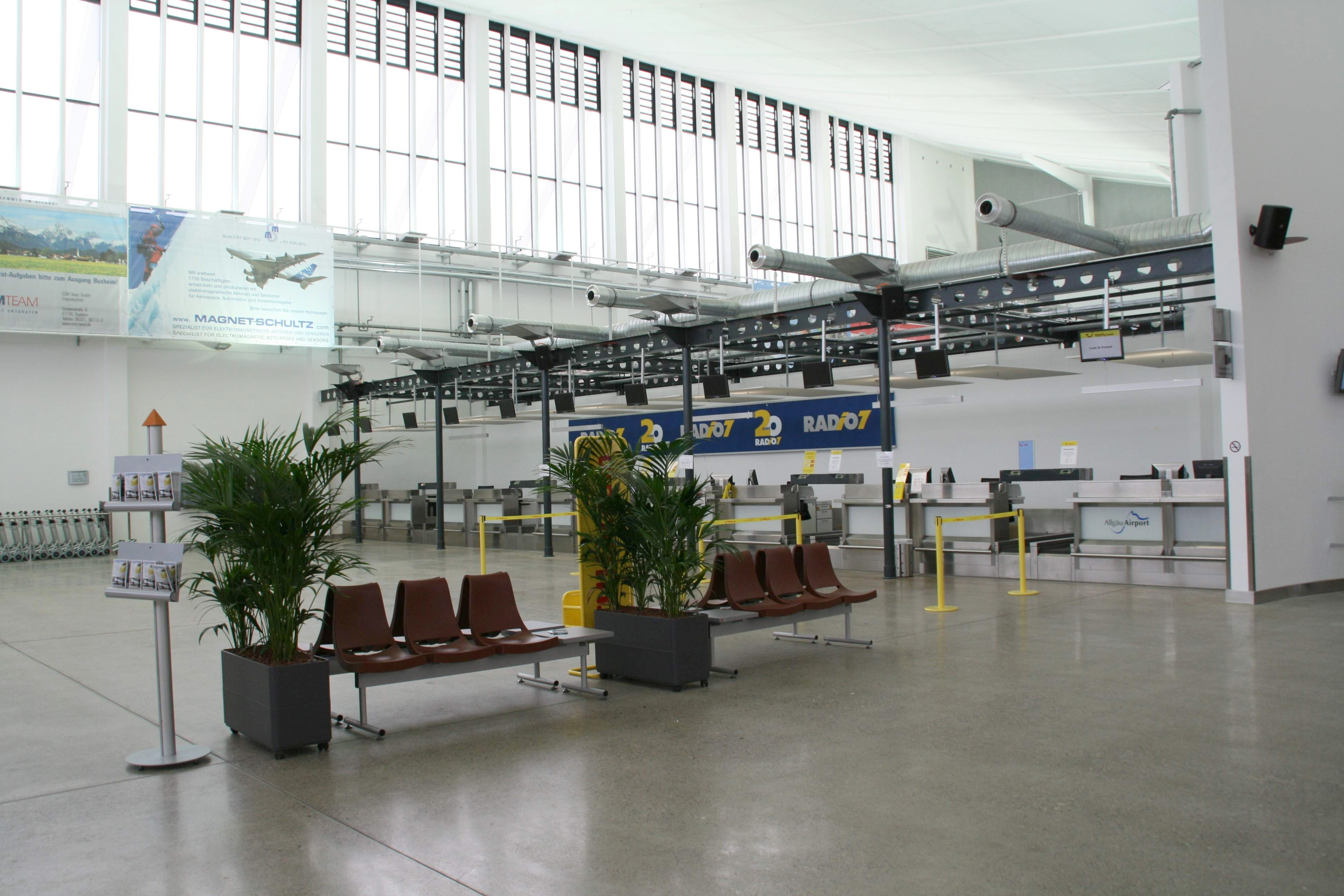
Check-in area inside the main hall, the interior has since been rearranged to accommodate longer queues and bag drop machines.

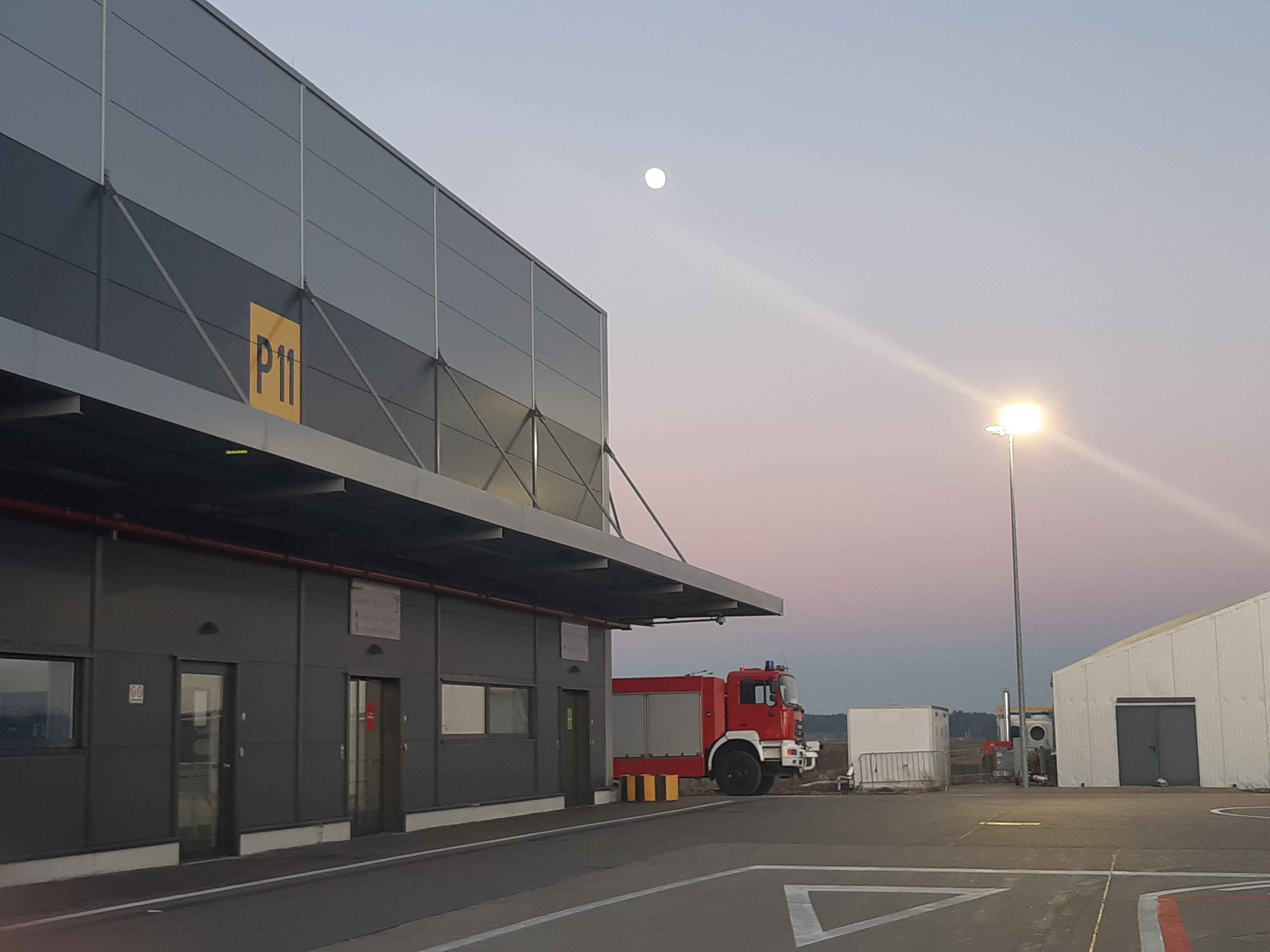
Arrivals hall

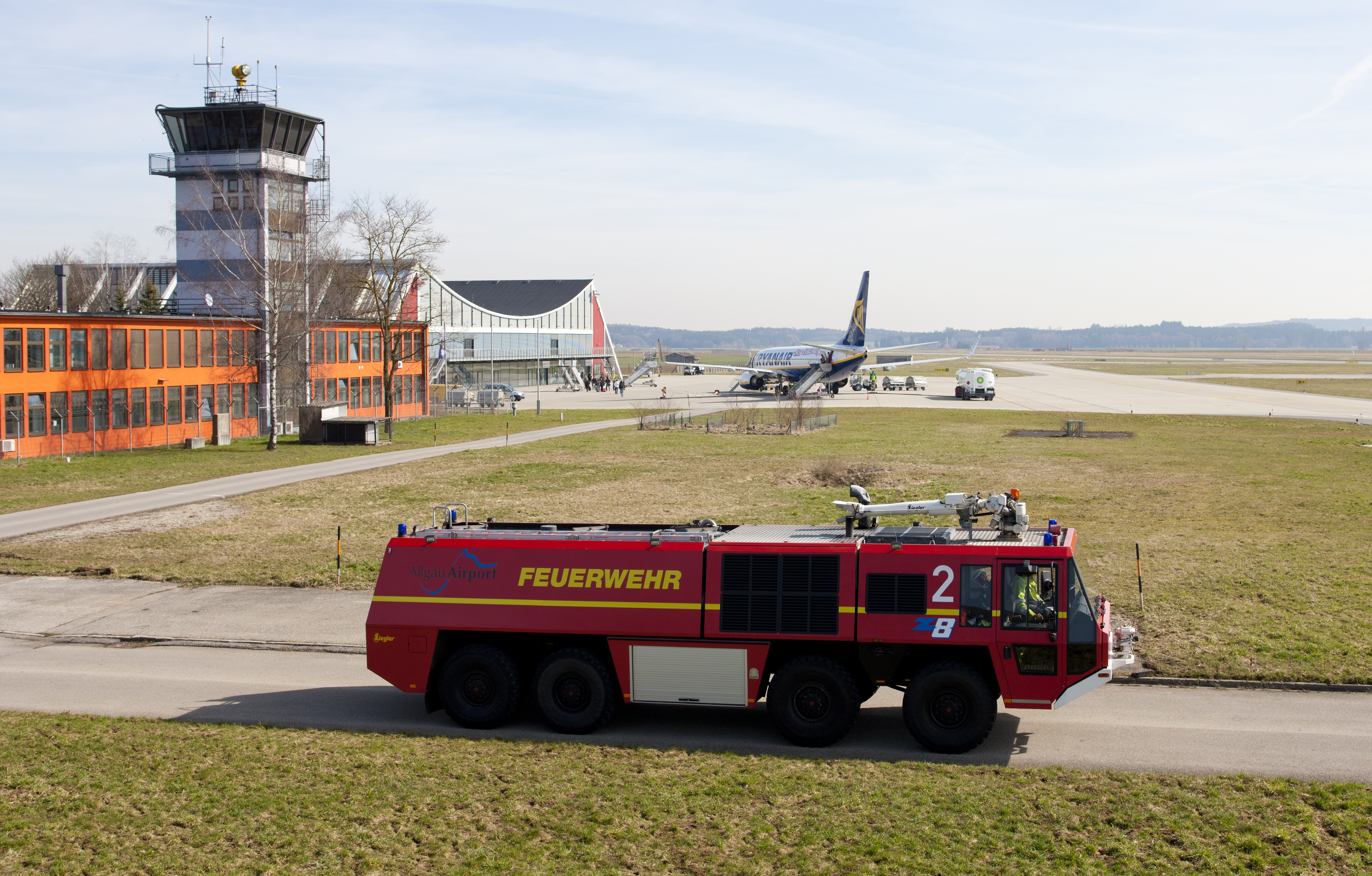
Apron and ATC tower

=== Terminal ===
Memmingen Airport has one passenger terminal building equipped with 11 check-in counters (4 of which are self bag drop for Ryanair and Wizz customers) and overall 12 departure gates. Schengen flights (Zone A, Gates 1-7) on the ground floor and Non-Schengen flights (Zone B, Gates 23-25) as well as a variable Gate 8/26 on the upper floor. There are also two planned gates as per airport signage to open as part of the extended second floor in the terminal expansion project (Zone B, Gates 21, 22). The building has no jet bridges, therefore walk-boarding and bus-boarding is used. There is also a duty-free shop, as well as some food outlets and car-hire facilities at the airport. The terminal has a capacity of two million passengers per year. In October 2021, a vastly expanded arrivals hall and baggage claim area was inaugurated, replacing the old arrivals hall, allowing for it to be converted into two extra gates. This was followed by another annex containing new gates 6 and 7 in 2024.

=== Runway, Taxiways and Aprons ===
Memmingen Airport has an ILS Category 1 for runway 24 and is equipped with NDB/DME and GPS RNAV. Originally, the runway was only 30 metres (98 ft) wide with accordingly narrow taxiways due to its former use as a facility for jet fighter aircraft. However, an expansion to the international standard 45 metres (148 ft) had been granted in 2016 and was completed in September 2019. Simultaneously, the runway was equipped with new LED lighting, while an upgrade of the ILS for direction 06 was under preparation. In March 2025, construction of Taxiway R, intended to create conditions to operate in all-weather conditions, was completed, and was opened to regular aircraft usage later in the year.

Two aprons provide parking spaces for six mid-sized aircraft such as the Airbus A320 and Boeing 737 at a time as well as some smaller business jets. Apron 1 has the capacity for two aircraft and is located in front of the main terminal building. Apron 2 can facilitate four aircraft, being positioned some distance from the terminal. These remote stands are commonly accessed through bus-boarding. There is an additional smaller Apron 3 for general aviation aircraft located on the other side of the runway.

There are two planned Code C mid-sized parking positions to be built as part of the Apron 1 extension and wider airport expansion project. This will bring the total number of mid-sized stands to eight.

== Airlines and destinations ==
The following airlines operate regular scheduled and charter flights at Memmingen Airport:

Airlines	Destinations
Aegean Airlines	Seasonal charter: Heraklion, Rhodes
Avanti Air	Seasonal charter: Calvi
Eurowings	Seasonal: Palma de Mallorca
Freebird Airlines	Seasonal: Antalya
Ryanair	Alicante, Banja Luka, Bucharest–Băneasa, Catania, Dublin, Faro, Kraków, London–Stansted, Málaga, Malta, Manchester, Palermo, Palma de Mallorca, Paphos, Porto, Rome–Fiumicino, Sofia, Tangier, Thessaloniki, Tenerife–South, Tirana, Valencia, Zagreb; Seasonal: Alghero, Amman–Queen Alia, Brindisi, Chania, Dubrovnik, Girona, Gran Canaria, Lamezia Terme, Naples, Pescara, Pisa, Pula, Riga, Sarajevo, Zadar
SunExpress	Seasonal: Antalya
Wizz Air	Belgrade, Brașov, Bucharest–Băneasa, Budapest, Catania, Chișinău, Cluj-Napoca, Craiova, Iași, Kutaisi, Niš, Ohrid, Podgorica, Pristina, Sibiu, Skopje, Sofia, Suceava, Târgu Mureș, Timișoara, Tirana, Tuzla, Varna, Yerevan

== Statistics ==
=== Annual traffic ===
	Passengers
2008	462,000
2009	▲810,000
2010	▲911,609
2011	▼764,782
2012	▲869,937
2013	▼838,971
2014	▼750,000
2015	▲883,490
2016	▲996,714
2017	▲1,179,875
2018	▲1,492,553
2019	▲1,722,764
2020	▼690,780
2021	▲980,503
2022	▲1,991,208
2023	▲2,824,711
2024	▲3,245,826

=== Route statistics ===
Busiest routes at Memmingen Airport (Summer 2024)
Rank	Destination	Weekly Departing Flights	Number of Available Seats	Operating Airlines
1	Palma de Mallorca	15	79,000	Eurowings, Ryanair
2	Sofia	8	48,000	Ryanair, Wizz Air
3	Banja Luka	7	45,000	Ryanair
4	London–Stansted	7	44,000	Ryanair
5	Belgrade	7	43,000	Wizz Air
6	Tirana	7	42,000	Wizz Air
7	Rome–Fiumicino	7	41,000	Ryanair
8	Skopje	7	38,000	Wizz Air
9	Girona	7	35,000	Ryanair
10	Palermo	6	34,000	Ryanair

== Ground transportation ==
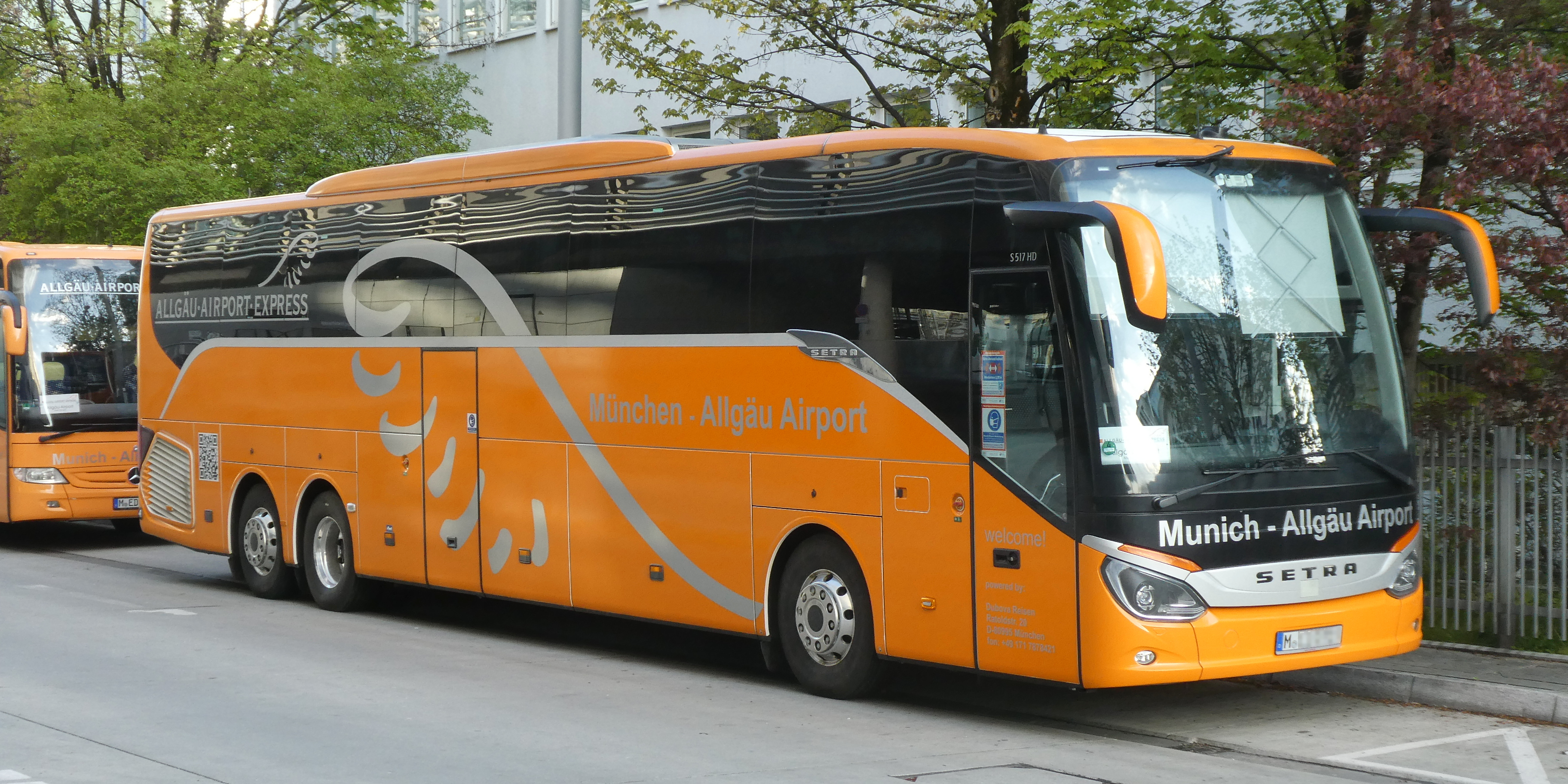
An Allgäu Airport Express coach in Munich

=== Road ===
The airport is located close to the A96 motorway (Memmingen Ost exit) and its intersection with the A7 motorway. The A96 leads directly to Munich, Lake Constance, and Switzerland, while the A7 leads to Ulm, Northern Germany, and Austria. Taxis as well as several car-hire companies are available in the car hire centre opposite the terminal building.

=== Coach ===
There are dedicated coach services from Memmingen Airport directly to Munich. From 1 October 2026, Flibco operates a direct shuttle service between Memmingen Airport and Munich Hauptbahnhof (ZOB), with 15 departures per day and a journey time of approximately 85 minutes. Long-distance coaches operated by FlixBus also connect the airport with several cities in Germany and neighbouring countries.

=== Bus and rail ===
Local bus lines 2 and 810/811 connect the airport within a 15-minute drive with Memmingen town centre, including Memmingen railway station, from where frequent Deutsche Bahn services depart for Munich (journey time approx. 1:00) and Augsburg (journey time approx. 1:10), as well as some EuroCity long-distance Swiss Federal Railways services to Bregenz and Zurich.

== See also ==
- Transport in Germany
- List of airports in Germany
