= List of Panavia Tornado operators =

Panavia Tornado operators
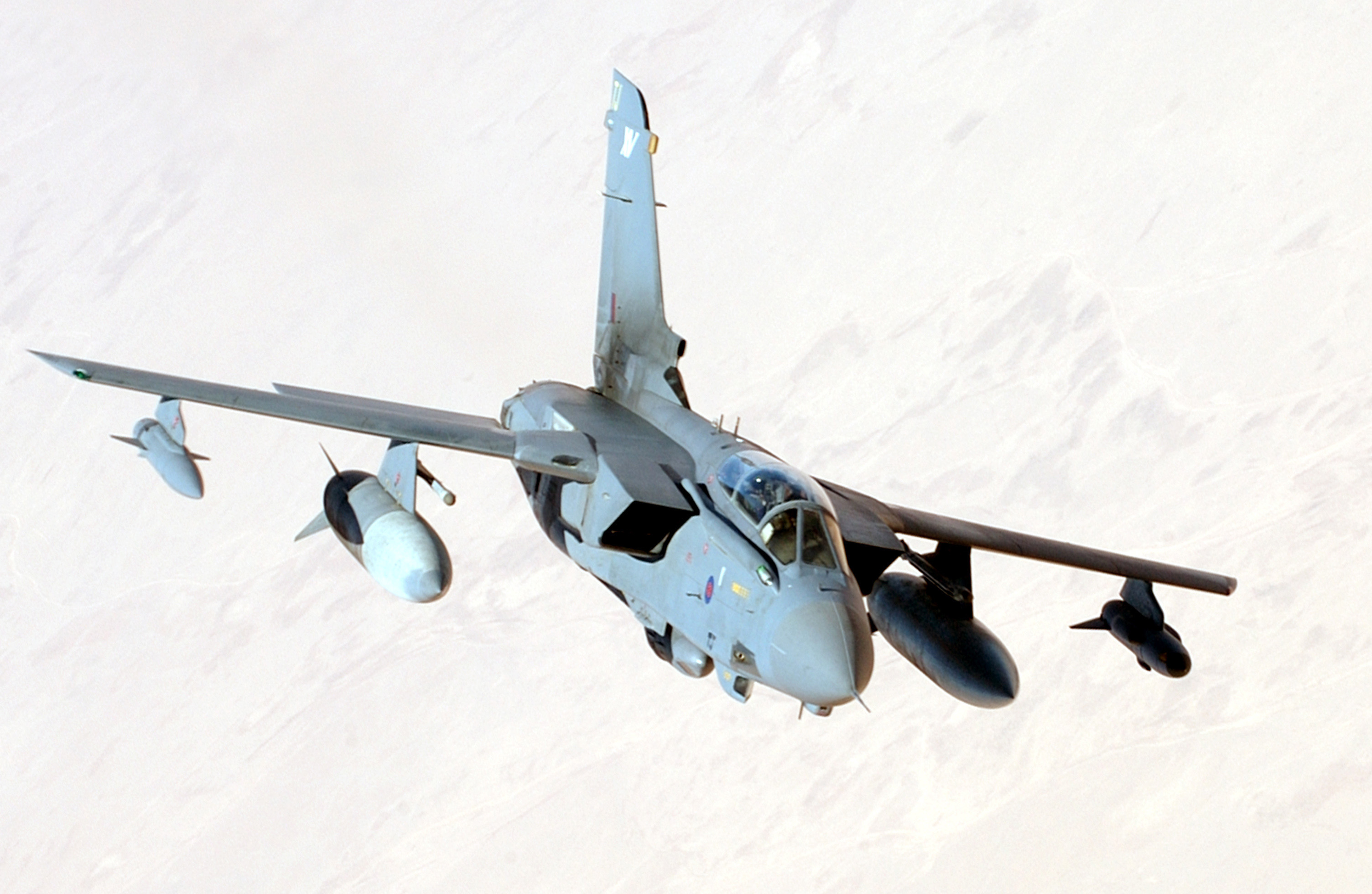
- A Royal Air Force Tornado in flight during Operation Iraqi Freedom

This is a list of operators of the Panavia Tornado multi-role combat aircraft.

== Operators ==
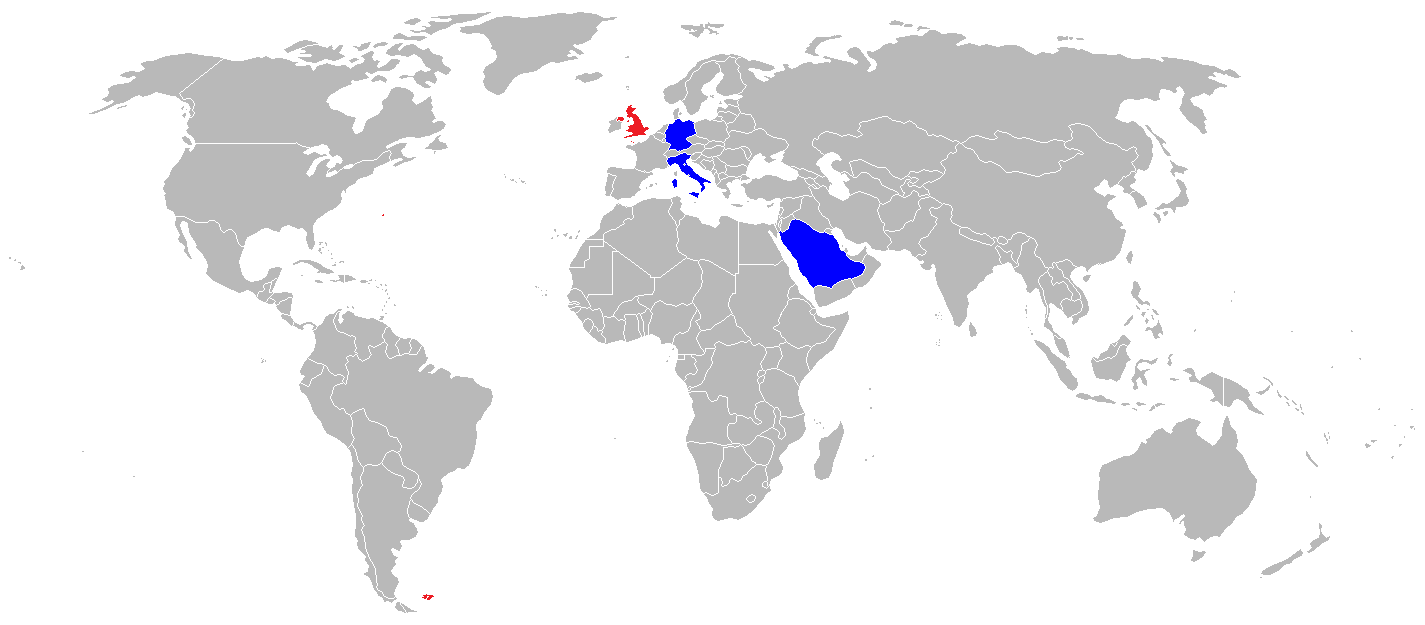
Operators of the Panavia Tornado

As of 2018, 320 operational Tornados are in use. Active units are in bold.

Italy

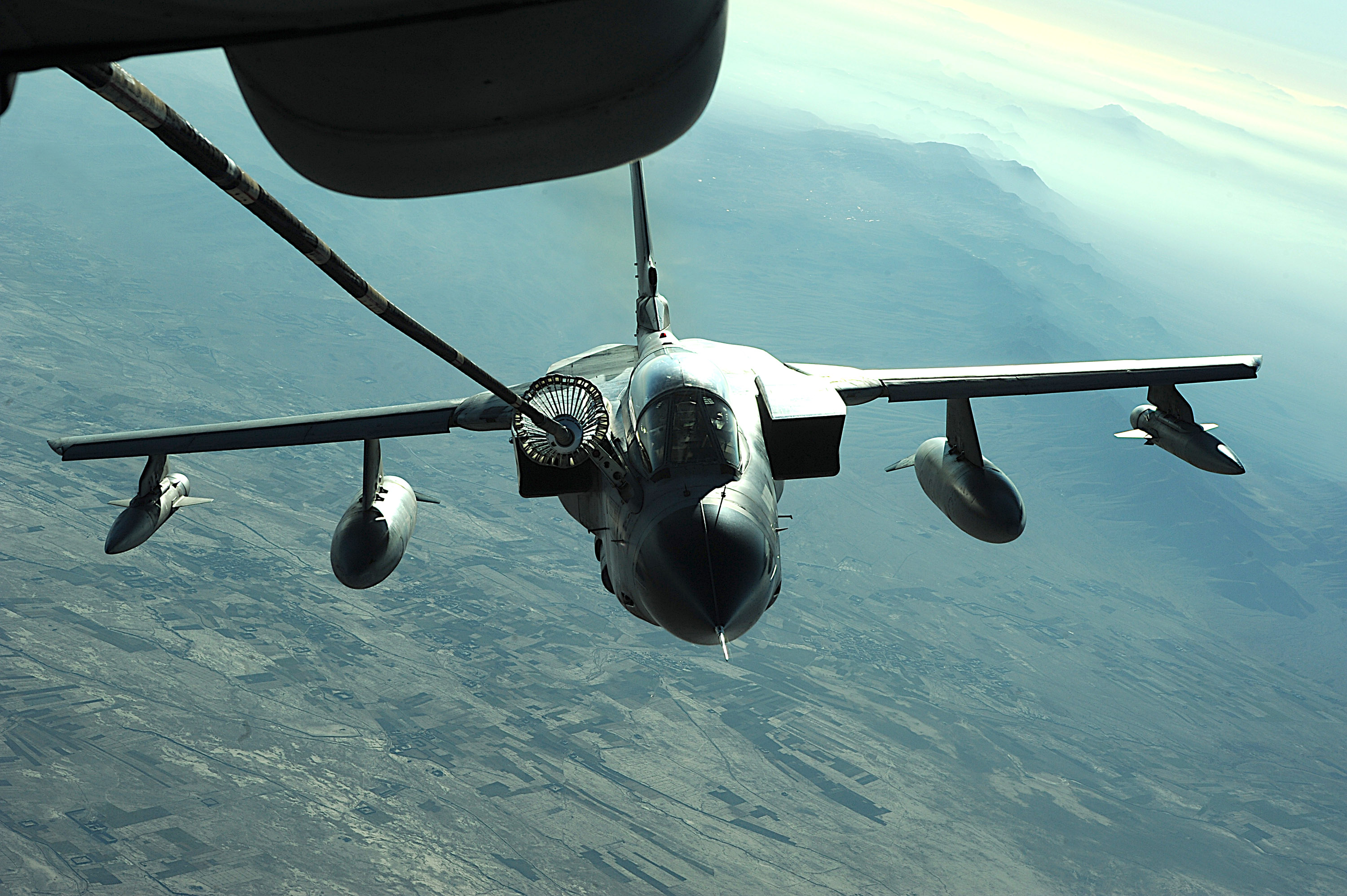
Italian Tornado IDS takes on fuel over Afghanistan

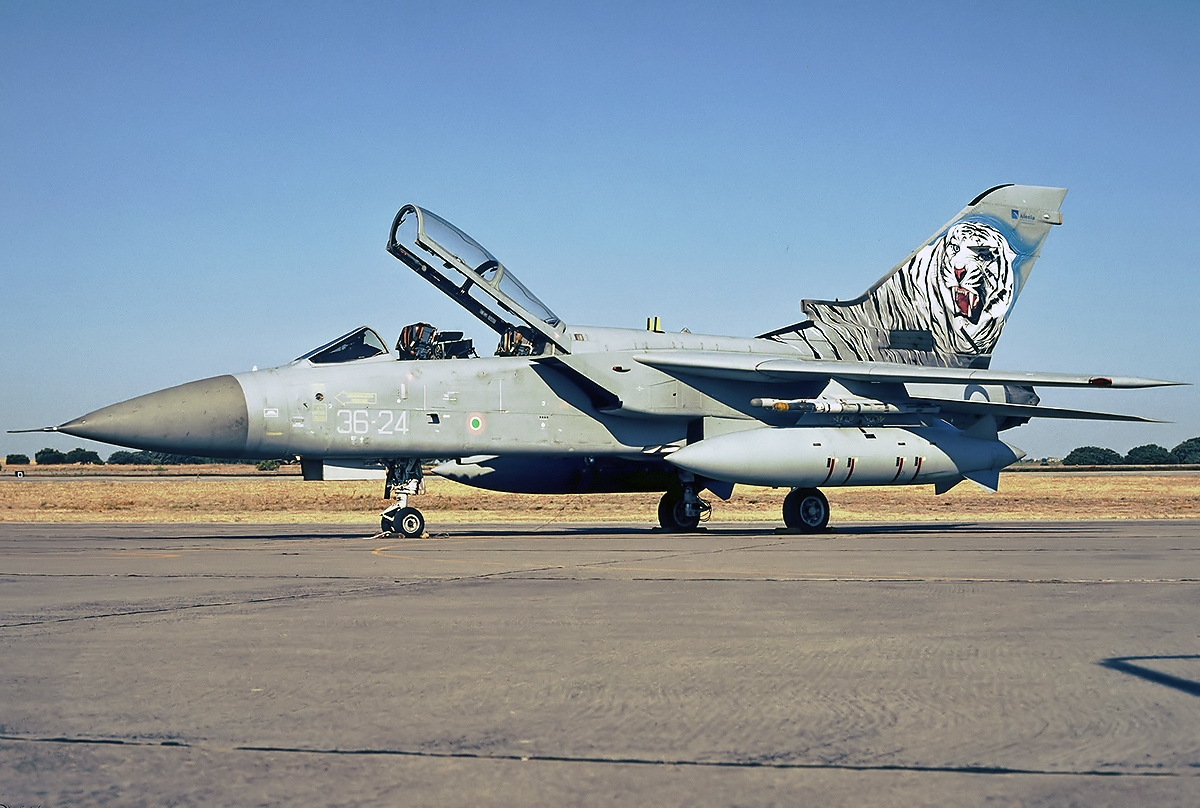
Italian Tornado ADV at Gioia del Colle airbase

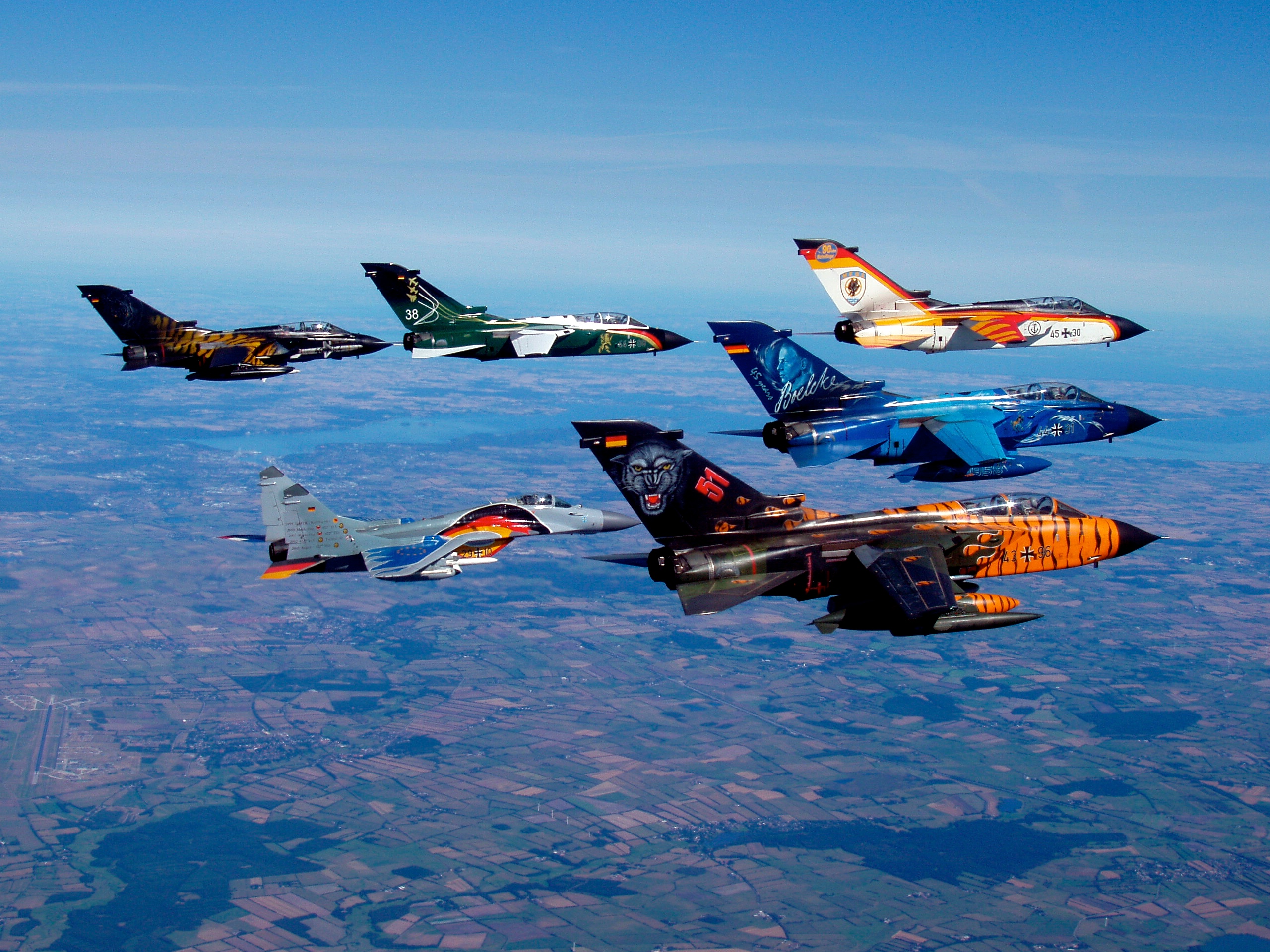
Formation of German Tornadoes, together with a MiG-29

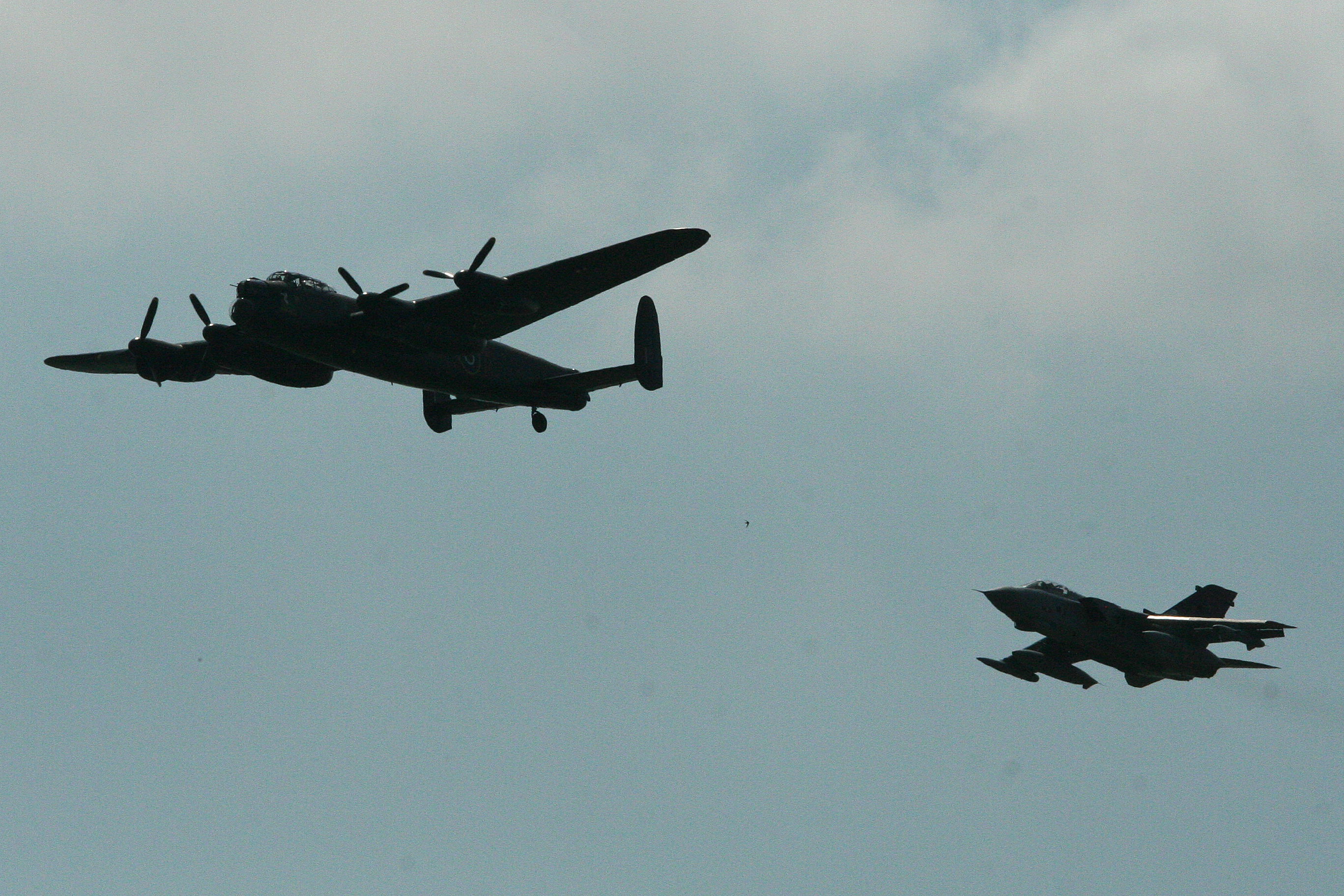
UK Tornado IDS in formation with an Avro Lancaster

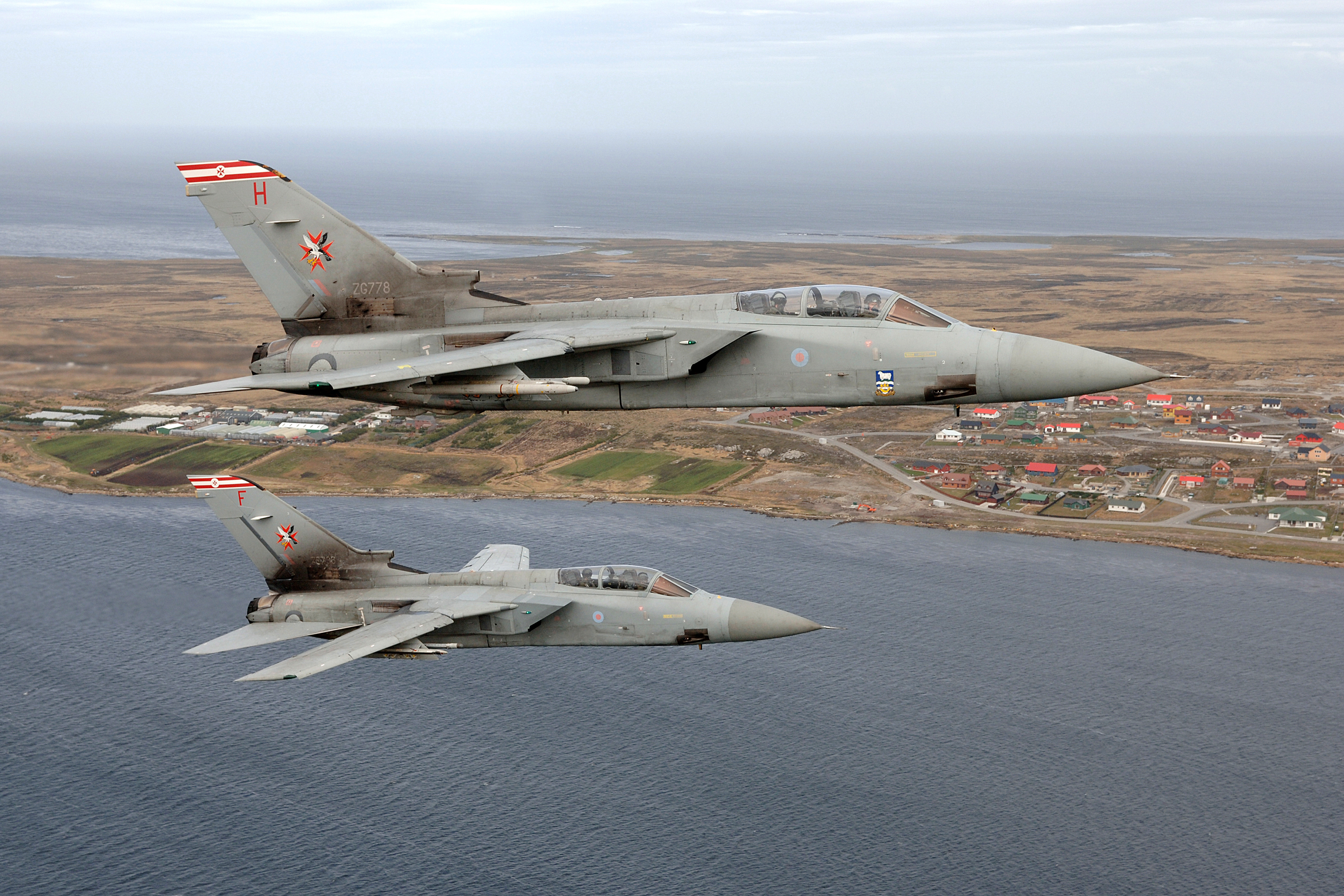
A pair of UK Tornado ADVs operating over the Falkland Islands

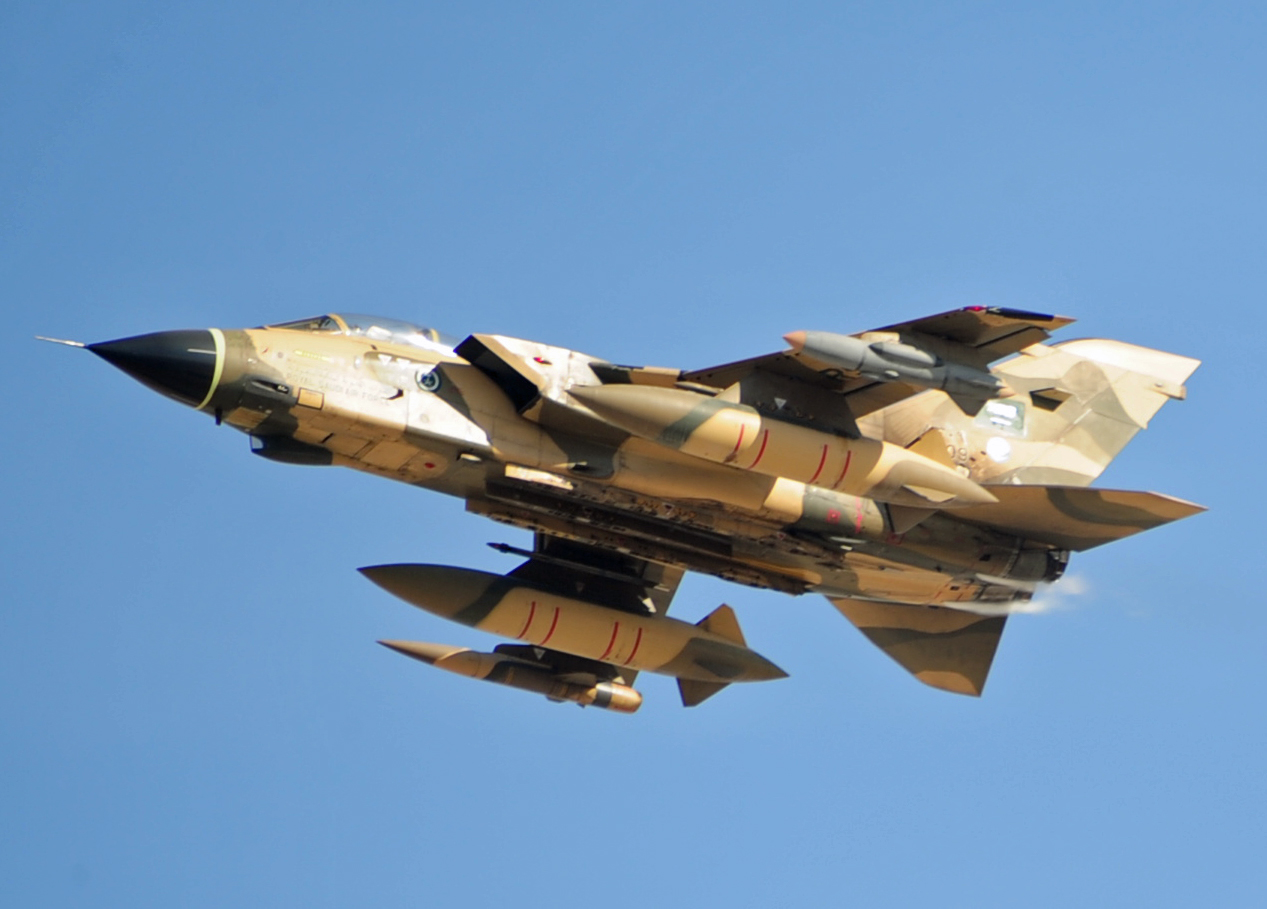
Saudi Tornado IDS operating over Doha

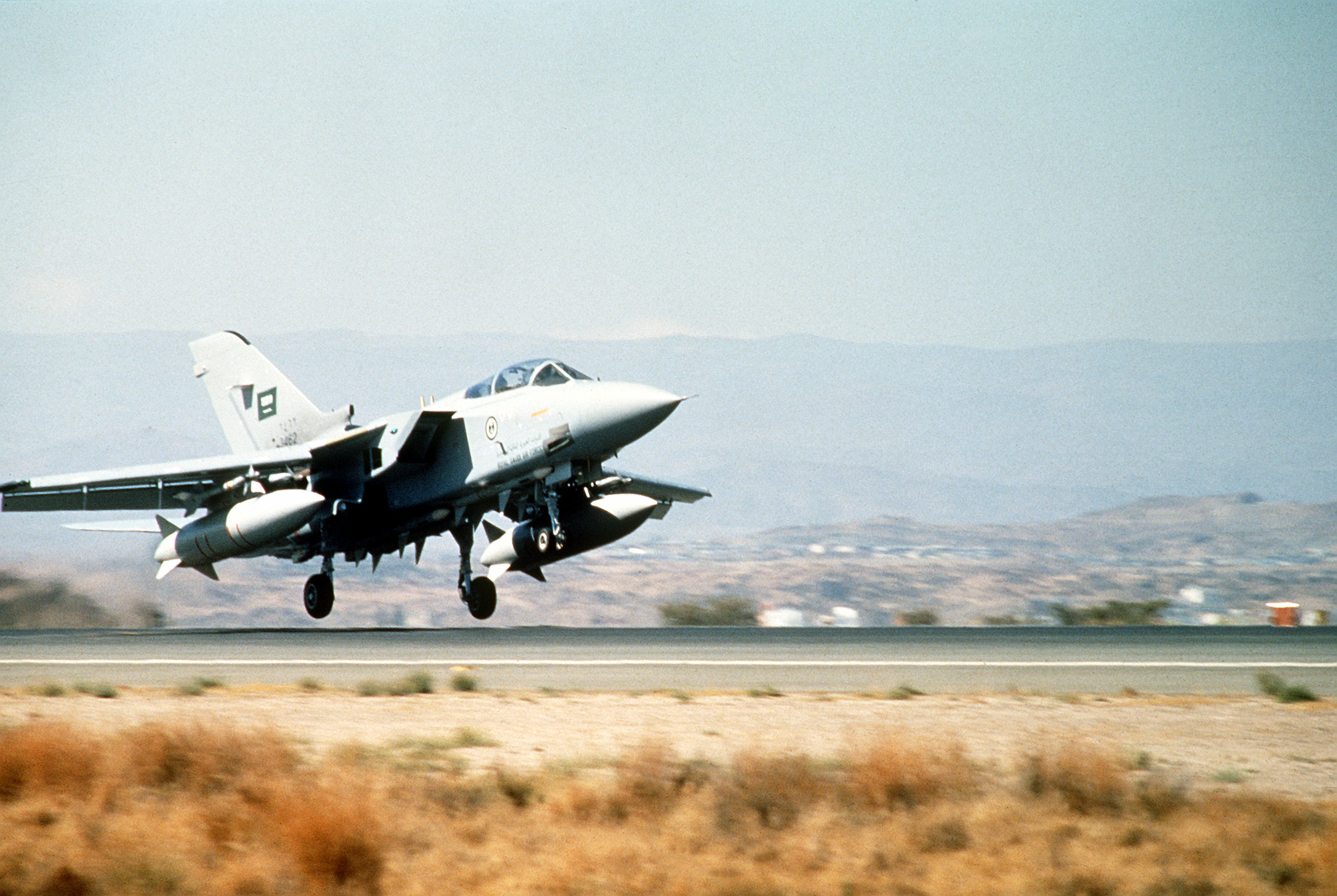
Saudi Tornado ADV takes off during Operation Desert Shield

- Aeronautica Militare - Italy procured a total of 100 IDS aircraft, of which 99 were production models and one was a pre-series aircraft converted to production standard. Twelve of these were dual-control versions. Sixteen were subsequently converted to ECR aircraft. In 1993, an agreement was reached with the United Kingdom to lease a total of 24 ADV aircraft, which were operated until 2004. As of 2018, Italy operates 70 Tornado IDS and 5 Tornado ECR.
  - **102° Gruppo, 6° Stormo** at Ghedi, flying IDS. Active from 1993.
  - **154° Gruppo, 6° Stormo** at Ghedi, flying IDS. Ritard 1982.2025
  - **155° Gruppo E.T.S., 6° Stormo** at Ghedi, flying IDS/ECR. Active from 1985, equipped with ECR from 1998. Previously assigned to 50° Stormo at Piacenza.
  - 156° Gruppo, 6° Stormo at Ghedi, flying IDS. First operational with Tornados from 1984. Now inactive. Previously assigned to 36° Stormo specialised in antishipping and TASMO roles.
  - 12° Gruppo, 36° Stormo at Gioia del Colle, flying ADV, now inactive, operational between 1984/1995-2004, replaced by Eurofighter Typhoon.
  - 21° Gruppo, 36° Stormo at Gioia del Colle, flying ADV. Now with 9° Stormo flying helicopters in special operations. Previously assigned to 53° Stormo at Cameri airbase.

Germany

- Luftwaffe - Germany's air force obtained a total of 245 Tornado aircraft, with 210 of them as the IDS version, and 35 ECR.
  - Jagdbombergeschwader 31 "Boelcke" at Nörvenich flying IDS. Converted to Eurofighter Typhoon in 2009.
  - Jagdbombergeschwader 32 at Lagerlechfeld flying ECR (34 aircraft). Disbanded in March 2013, operated between August 1985 – March 2013.
  - **Taktisches Luftwaffengeschwader 33** at Büchel flying IDS. Active, 46 aircraft.
  - Jagdbombergeschwader 34 "Allgäu" at Memmingen. Disbanded in 2003.
  - Jagdbombergeschwader 38 "Friesland" at Jever. Disbanded, German Tactical Conversion unit, August 1983 – September 2005.
  - **Taktisches Luftwaffengeschwader 51** "Immelmann" at Jagel/Schleswig, flying ECR. Active, 25 aircraft.
  - **Fliegerisches Ausbildungszentrum der Luftwaffe** at Holloman Air Force Base, NM, USA, flying IDS. Operational Conversion Unit. Disbanded December 2019.
- Marineflieger - The German Naval Air Arm obtained 112 IDS aircraft for the anti-shipping mission.
  - Marinefliegergeschwader 1 at Jagel, flying IDS. Disbanded, operated between 2 July 1982 – 1 January 1994.
  - Marinefliegergeschwader 2 at Eggebek, flying IDS. Disbanded, operated between 1986 and 2005.

United Kingdom

- Royal Air Force - The United Kingdom obtained a total of 228 IDS aircraft; of these, 16 were subsequently converted to undertake the reconnaissance mission, alongside a further 14 new build airframes. Another 28 were converted for the anti-shipping mission. In addition, a total of 165 ADV aircraft were obtained, comprising 18 F.2s and 147 F.3s. The United Kingdom was the first country to completely phase out the Tornado when its last two units were disbanded in March 2019.
  - No. II (Army Co-operation) Squadron at Laarbruch then Marham, flying GR4/4A (12 aircraft). Disbanded, operated between September 1988 – January 2015.
  - No. V (Army Co-operation) Squadron at Coningsby, flying F3. Disbanded, operated between 1987 – January 2003
  - No. IX (Bomber) Squadron at Honington, then Brüggen and Marham, flying GR4/4A (~12 aircraft). Disbanded, operated between 6 January 1982 – 14 March 2019.
  - No. XI (Fighter) Squadron at Leeming, flying F3. Disbanded, operated between August 1988 – October 2005.
  - No. 12 Squadron at Lossiemouth, flying GR4/4A (~12 aircraft). Disbanded, operated between September 1993 – 31 March 2014; 9 January 2015 – 14 February 2018.
  - No. XIII Squadron at Honington then Marham, flying GR4/4A (12 aircraft). Disbanded, operated between 1 January 1990 – 13 May 2011.
  - No. 14 Squadron at Brüggen then Lossiemouth, flying GR4/4A (12 aircraft). Disbanded, operated between 1 November 1985 – 1 June 2011.
  - No. XV (Reserve) Squadron at Laarburch, then Honington (became GR4 Operational Conversion Unit) and Lossiemouth, flying GR4 (26 aircraft). Disbanded, operated between 1 September 1983 – 31 March 2017.
  - No. 16 Squadron at Laarbruch, flying GR1. Disbanded, operated between 13 December 1983 – 11 September 1991.
  - No. XVII Squadron at Brüggen, flying GR1. Disbanded, operated between 1 March 1985 – 31 March 1999.
  - No. 20 Squadron at Laarbruch, flying GR1. Disbanded, operated between 29 June 1984 – 31 July 1992.
  - No. 23 (Fighter) Squadron at Leeming, flying F3. Disbanded, operated between 1 November 1988 – 28 February 1994.
  - No. XXV (Fighter) Squadron at Leeming, flying F3. Disbanded, operated between July 1989 – 4 April 2008.
  - No. 27 Squadron at Marham, flying GR1. Disbanded and reformed as 12 Squadron, operated between 12 August 1983 – 1 October 1993.
  - No. 29 (Fighter) Squadron at Coningsby, flying F3. Disbanded, operated between April 1987– 31 October 1998.
  - No. 31 Squadron at Brüggen then Marham, flying GR4/4A (~10 aircraft). Disbanded, operated between September 1984 – 14 March 2019.
  - No. 41 (Reserve) Squadron at Coningsby. The Typhoon & Tornado Test and Evaluation Squadron (TES) (2 Aircraft). Disbanded, operated between 1 April 2006 – 16 November 2017
  - No. 43 (Fighter) Squadron at Leuchars, flying F3. Disbanded, operated between September 1989 – 13 July 2009.
  - No. 45 (Reserve) Squadron at Honington, flying GR1. Renumbered XV(R) Sqn, operated between January 1984 – 31 March 1992.
  - No. 56 (Reserve) Squadron at Leuchars, flying F3. Disbanded, operated between 1 August 1992– 22 April 2008.
  - No. 111 (Fighter) Squadron at Leuchars, flying F3. Disbanded, operated between June 1990 – 22 March 2011.
  - No. 617 Squadron at Marham then Lossiemouth, flying GR4/4A (12 aircraft). Disbanded, operated between 1 January 1983 – 28 March 2014.
  - No. 229 Operational Conversion Unit (No 65 (Reserve) Squadron) at Coningsby, flying F2/3. Renumbered 56(R) Sqn, operated between 1984 – 31 July 1992.
  - No. 1435 Flight at Mount Pleasant, flying F3 (4 aircraft). Replaced by Typhoon FGR4, operated between July 1992 – September 2009.
  - F3 Operational Evaluation Unit at Coningsby, flying F3. Merged with SAOEU becoming FJWOEU, operated between 1987 – 2004.
  - Fast Jet and Weapons Operational Evaluation Unit (FJWOEU) at Coningsby, flying F3/GR4. Redesignated as 41(R) Sqn, operated between 2004 – April 2006.
  - Strike Attack Operational Evaluation Unit (SAOEU) at Boscombe Down, flying GR1/4. Merged with F3 OEU becoming FJWOEU, operated between 5 October 1987 – 2004.
  - Tri-National Tornado Training Establishment (TTTE) at Cottesmore, flying IDS, GR1. Disbanded, operated between 1 July 1980 – 31 March 1999.
  - Tornado Weapons Conversion Unit (TWCU) at Honington, flying GR1. Redesignated 45(R) Sqn, operated between 1 August 1980 – January 1984.
  - Tornado Operational Evaluation Unit at Boscombe Down, flying GR1. Redesignated as SAOEU, operated between 1 September 1983 – 5 October 1987.

Saudi Arabia

- Royal Saudi Air Force - Saudi Arabia initially obtained 72 Tornados, comprising 48 IDS and 24 ADV. A further 48 IDS aircraft were subsequently obtained.
  - **7th Squadron RSAF** IDS
  - 29th Squadron RSAF ADV 1989-2006
  - 34th Squadron RSAF ADV 1989-1992
  - 66th Squadron RSAF IDS from 1990, now inactive
  - **75th Squadron RSAF** IDS
  - **83rd Squadron RSAF** IDS
