= IFX =

IFX may refer to:

- IFX AG or Infineon Technologies AG, a German semiconductor manufacturer
- KFX/IFX, a joint South Korean and Indonesian program to develop a fighter jet
- IFX Piranha, video software for Linux
- Clarisse IFX, a proprietary 3D rendering software
- IFX, International Flight Training Academy ICAO code
- Interactive Financial Exchange (IFX), a financial data transfer file format
- IFX is a name for the current Intel Fortran Compiler

== See also ==
- FX (disambiguation)
