= IJW =

IJW may refer to:

- IJW, ICAO airline code for Interjet Inc.
- IJW Whiskey, brand counseled by Mitchell Silk
- IJW, wrestling league that Mike Senica competed in
