= IVV =

IVV may refer to:

- IVV, symbol for the exchange-traded fund iShares S&P 500 Index
- Ivatan language, ISO 639 code
- Internationale Vereinigung für Vegetationskunde, former name of the International Association for Vegetation Science
- Istituto di virologia vegetale, an institute of the Italian National Research Council
- Internationaler Volkssportverband (International Federation of Popular Sports) a German-based sports federation originating from volksmarching or fitness walking
- IV&V, abbreviation for independent verification and validation, used to check a product, service, or system
- IVV Femida, a Russian airline in list of airline codes
