= Italy First =

Italy First may refer to:

- Italy First (airline)
- Italy First (political alliance)
- Italy First (political party)
