= ICJ (disambiguation) =

ICJ is the International Court of Justice.

ICJ may also refer to:

- Icejet, a defunct charter airline
- International Commission of Jurists, a non-governmental human rights organization
- International Council of Jurists, a company based in London
- ISKCON Communications Journal, a biannual magazine published 1994–2005
