= List of airline codes (I) =

This is a list of all airline codes. The table lists the IATA airline designators, the ICAO airline designators and the airline call signs (telephony designator). Historical assignments are also included for completeness.

== Codes ==
Airline codes
IATA	ICAO	Airline	Call sign	Country	Comments
I4	EXP	Island Air Express	ISLAND EXPRESS	United States	2014
	IWL	Island Wings		Bahamas	2014
IK	KAR	Ikar	IKAR	Russian Federation	
	ICN	Iconair		Pakistan	
	IAC	INTERCHARTER	Romania		
	ITC	International Air Carrier Association		Belgium	
	IDG	IDG Technology Air	INDIGO	Czech Republic	
	IFL	IFL Group	EIFEL	United States	
	RDE	II Lione Alato Arl	FLIGHT RED	United Kingdom	
	IJM	IJM International Jet Management	JET MANAGEMENT	Austria	
	IKK	IKI International Airlines	IKIAIR	Japan	
	IKN	IKON FTO	IKON	Germany	
	BLU	IMP Aviation Services	BLUENOSE	Canada	
	XGG	IMP Group Aviation Services		Canada	
1F		INFINI Travel Information		Japan	Computer Reservation System
	IPA	IPEC Aviation	IPEC	Australia	
	IPM	IPM Europe	SHIPEX	United Kingdom	
	LVB	IRS Airlines	SILVERBIRD	Nigeria	
	ISD	ISD Avia	ISDAVIA	Ukraine	
1U		ITA Software		United States	Computer reservation system
	FDF	IVV Femida		Russia	
IB	IBE	Iberia Airlines	IBERIA	Spain	
II	CSQ	IBC Airways	CHASQUI	United States	
I2	IBS	Iberia Express	IBEREXPRESS	Spain	Charter service, low cost carrier for EU flights of Iberia operating only A320s
	IBR	Ibertour Servicios Aéreos	IBERTOUR	Spain	
	IBT	Ibertrans Aérea	IBERTRANS	Spain	
TY	IWD	Iberworld	IBERWORLD	Spain	
FW	IBX	Ibex Airlines	IBEX	Japan	
	IBC	Ibicenca Air	IBICENCA	Spain	
	AKI	Ibk-Petra		Sudan	
0C	IBL	IBL Aviation	CATOVAIR	Mauritius	
	BBL	IBM Euroflight Operations	BLUE	Switzerland	
	YYY	ICAO			Used by airlines without a specific code
C3	IPR	Independent Carrier (ICAR)	ICAR	Ukraine	
	ICA	Icaro	ICARFLY	Italy	
	ICD	Icaro Air	ICARO	Ecuador	Defunct 2011
	IUS	Icarus	ICARUS	Italy	
	CIC	ICC Canada	AIR TRADER	Canada	
	ICJ	Icejet	ICEJET	Iceland	
HC		Iceland Express		Iceland	defunct
FI	ICE	Icelandair	ICEAIR	Iceland	
	ICG	Icelandic Coast Guard	ICELAND COAST	Iceland	
	RAC	Icar Air	TUZLA AIR	Bosnia and Herzegovina	
	FRC	Icare Franche Compte	FRANCHE COMPTE	France	
	IFM	Ifly	ICOPTER	Greece	
	IKR	Ikaros DK	IKAROS	Denmark	
	CIO	Il Ciocco International Travel Service	CIOCCO	Italy	
	ILV	Il-Avia	ILAVIA	Russia	
	IDL	Ildefonso Redriguez	ILDEFONSO	Mexico	
V8	IAR	Iliamna Air Taxi	ILIAMNA AIR	United States	
	ILP	Ilpo Aruba Cargo		Aruba	
	ILL	Ilyich-Avia	ILYICHAVIA	Ukraine	
	IMR	Imaer	IMAER	Portugal	
	ITX	Imair Airlines	IMPROTEX	Azerbaijan	
	PNX	Imperial Airways	PHOENIX	United States	ICAO code in use by another company, call sign no longer allocated
	IMG	Imperial Cargo Airlines	IMPERIAL AIRLINES	Ghana	
	IMT	Imtrec Aviation	IMTREC	Cambodia	
DH	IDE	Independence Air	INDEPENDENCE AIR	United States	defunct
	IDP	Independent Air Freighters	INDEPENDENT	Australia	
I7	IOA	IndiaOne Air	INDIA FIRST	India	
6E	IGO	IndiGo	IFLY	India	InterGlobe Aviation
	IIL	India International Airways	INDIA INTER	India	
	IFC	Indian Air Force	INDIAN AIRFORCE	India	
IC	IAC	Indian Airlines	INDAIR	India	
	IDR	Indicator Company	INDICATOR	Hungary	
I9	IBU	Indigo Airlines	INDIGO BLUE	United States	
VP	AXC	Indochina Airlines	AIRSPUP	Vietnam	defunct
	IDA	Indonesia Air Transport	INTRA	Indonesia	
QZ	AWQ	Indonesia AirAsia	WAGON AIR	Indonesia	
IO	IAA	Indonesian Airlines	INDO LINES	Indonesia	
	IPN	Industri Pesawat Terbang Nusantara	NUSANTARA	Indonesia	
	ITN	Industrias Titan	TITANLUX	Spain	
	FFI	Infinit Air	INFINIT	Spain	
	INS	Inflite The Jet Centre		United Kingdom	
	IVA	Innotech Aviation	INNOTECH	Canada	
	INC	Insel Air International	INSELAIR	Netherlands Antilles	
	ICC	Institut Cartogràfic de Catalunya	CARTO	Spain	
	INT	Intair	INTAIRCO	Canada	
	INL	Intal Avia	INTAL AVIA	Kyrgyzstan	
	FFL	Intavia Limited		United Kingdom	
	XRA	Intensive Air	INTENSIVE	South Africa	
	ITW	Inter Air	INTER WINGS	Bulgaria	
	INX	Inter Express	INTER-EURO	Turkey	
	IIC	Inter Island Air Charter		Bahamas	2014
H4	IIN	Inter Island Airways		Cape Verde	
	CAR	Inter RCA	QUEBEC ROMEO	Central African Republic	
	NTT	Inter Tropic Airlines	INTER-TROPIC	Sierra Leone	
	TCU	Inter Tropical Aviation	TROPAIR	Suriname	Defunct 2001
	ITA	Inter-Air	CAFEX	United States	
	ICN	Inter-Canadian	INTER-CANADIAN	Canada	
	UGL	Inter-Island Air	UGLY VAN	United States	
	IMA	Inter-Mountain Airways	INTER-MOUNTAIN	United States	
	ITS	Inter-State Aviation	INTER-STATE	United States	
D6	ILN	Interair South Africa	INLINE	South Africa	
	NTE	Interaire	INTERMEX	Mexico	
ZA	SUW	Interavia Airlines	ASTAIR	Russia	
	IVT	Interaviatrans	INTERAVIA	Ukraine	
JY	IWY	InterCaribbean Airways	ISLANDWAYS	Turks and Caicos Islands	Name changed from Interisland Airways and Air Turks & Caicos
RS	ICT	Intercontinental de Aviación	CONTAVIA	Colombia	
	ICP	Intercopters	CHOPER	Spain	
	IFT	Interflight	INTERFLIGHT	United Kingdom	
	IJT	Interflight (Learjet)		United Kingdom	
	RFL	Interfly	INFLY	Italy	
	IFF	Interfreight Forwarding	INTERFREIGHT	Sudan	
	IGN	Interguide Air	DIVINE AIR	Nigeria	
	ISN	Interisland Airlines	TRI-BIRD	Philippines	
	IWY	Interisland Airways]	ISLANDWAYS	Turks and Caicos Islands	Name changed to Air Turks & Caicos, then InterCaribbean Airways
4O	AIJ	Interjet	ABC AEROLINEAS	Mexico	defunct
	IHE	Interjet Helicopters	INTERCOPTER	Greece	
	IJW	Interjet Inc.	JET WEST	United States	2015
ID	ITK	Interlink Airlines	INTERLINK	South Africa	
	IAK	International Air Cargo Corporation	AIR CARGO EGYPT	Egypt	
	EXX	International Air Corporation	EXPRESS INTERNATIONAL	United States	
N/A	NCC	T3 Aviation, Inc.	STARFLEET	United States	2020
	IAX	International Air Services	INTERAIR SERVICES	Liberia	
	IBY	International Business Aircraft	CENTRAL STAGE	United States	
	ICS	International Charter Services	INTERSERVI	Mexico	
	ICX	International Charter Xpress	INTEX	United States	Defunct 1994
	RED	International Committee of the Red Cross	RED CROSS	Switzerland	
	IIG	International Company for Transport, Trade and Public Works	ALDAWLYH AIR	Libya	
	IFX	International Flight Training Academy	IFTA	United States	
	IJA	International Jet Aviation Services	I-JET	United States	
	HSP	International Jet Charter	HOSPITAL	United States	The Flying Hospital
	THN	International Security Assistance Force	ATHENA	Canada	
	RSQ	International SOS Windhoek	SKYMEDIC	Namibia	
	ISF	International Stabilisation Assistance Force		United Kingdom	
	ITH	International Trans-Air	INTRANS NIGERIA	Nigeria	
	IPT	Interport Corporation	INTERPORT	United States	
	IKY	Intersky Bulgary	GENERAL SKY	Bulgaria	
3L	ISK	InterSky	INTERSKY	Austria	Defunct
I4	FWA	Interstate Airlines	FREEWAYAIR	Netherlands	Defunct
	ITU	Intervuelos	INTERLOS	Mexico	
	INV	Inversija	INVER	Latvia	
	IND	Iona National Airways	IONA	Ireland	
	IOA	Iowa Airways	IOWA AIR	United States	
IR	IRA	Iran Air	IRANAIR	Iran	
EP	IRC	Iran Aseman Airlines	ASEMAN	Iran	
B9	IRB	Iran Airtour	AIRTOUR	Iran	
	IRG	Iranian Naft Airlines	NAFT	Iran	
IA	IAW	Iraqi Airways	IRAQI	Iraq	
	BIS	Irbis Air	IRBIS	Kazakhstan	
	IRL	Irish Air Corps	IRISH	Ireland	
	RDK	Irish Air Transport	IRISH TRANS	Ireland	
	XMR	Irish Aviation Authority	AUTHORITY	Ireland	
IH	MZA	Irtysh Air	IRTYSH AIRLINES	Kazakhstan	Old IATA code: IT; old ICAO code: IRT
	KCE	Irving Oil	KACEY	Canada	
	ISI	Island Air	ISLANDMEX	Mexico	
	ILF	Island Air Charters	ISLAND FLIGHT	United States	
	XYZ	Island Air Express	RAINBIRD	United States	
	ISA	Island Airlines		United States	
	SOY	Island Aviation	SORIANO	Philippines	
	DQA	Island Aviation Services		Maldives	
	IOM	Island Aviation and Travel	ISLE AVIA	United Kingdom	
2S	SDY	Island Express	SANDY ISLE	United States	
	MTP	Island Helicopters	METROCOPTER	United States	
	ILC	ILAS Air		Japan	
	IAJ	Islandair Jersey	JARLAND	United Kingdom	
CN		Islands Nationair		Papua New Guinea	
	ICB	Icebird Airline	ICEBIRD	Iceland	
IF	ISW	Islas Airways	PINTADERA	Spain	
	IGS	Isle Grande Flying School	ISLA GRANDE	United States	
WC	ISV	Islena De Inversiones		Honduras	
	IOS	Isles of Scilly Skybus	SCILLONIA	United Kingdom	
	IAI	Israel Aircraft Industries	ISRAEL AIRCRAFT	Israel	
	IAF	Israeli Air Force		Israel	
6H	ISR	Israir	ISRAIR	Israel	
	IST	Istanbul Airlines	ISTANBUL	Turkey	
AZ	ITY	ITA Airways	ITARROW	Italy	
FS	ACL	Itali Airlines	SPADA	Italy	Former name: Transporti Aerei Italiani; former IATA Code: 9X*; former ICAO code: ACO
	IAM	Italian Air Force	ITALIAN AIRFORCE	Italy	
	IEI	Italian Army	ITALIAN ARMY	Italy	
	GCI	Italian Coast Guard	ITALIAN COAST GUARD	Italy	
	MMI	Italian Navy	ITALIAN NAVY	Italy	
	IFS	Italy First	RIVIERA	Italy	
GI	IKA	Itek Air	ITEK-AIR	Kyrgyzstan	?ICAO confirmed; IATA not
	IVS	Ivoire Aero Services	IVOIRE AERO	Ivory Coast	
	IVW	Ivoire Airways	IVOIRAIRWAYS	Ivory Coast	
	IJE	Ivoire Jet Express	IVOIRE JET	Ivory Coast	
	OIC	Iwamoto Crane Co Ltd		Japan	
	IXR	Ixair	X-BIRD	France	
H9	IZM	Izair	IZMIR	Turkey	
	IZA	Izhavia	IZHAVIA	Russia	

== IATA Traffic Conference Areas ==
The International Air Transport Association (IATA) divides the world into three areas called the Traffic Conference Areas (TCAs) for air travel purposes. These areas are used to define geographical boundaries for fare construction and other industry-related practices:

- Traffic Conference Area 1 (TC1) – this area includes the Americas, encompassing North America (the Caribbean, Central America, and Northern America) and South America.
- Traffic Conference Area 2 (TC2) – this area includes the EMEA region, encompassing Europe, the Middle East, and Africa (North Africa and Sub-Saharan Africa).
- Traffic Conference Area 3 (TC3) – this area includes the Asia–Pacific region, encompassing the rest of Asia (Central Asia, East Asia, North Asia, South Asia, and Southeast Asia) and Oceania.

Essentially, TC1 covers the "New World", while TC2 and TC3 together cover the "Old World" (Africa-Eurasia) and the "Land Down Under".

== See also ==
- IATA airport code
- ICAO airport code
