= InterSky =

Airline of Austria (2001–2015)

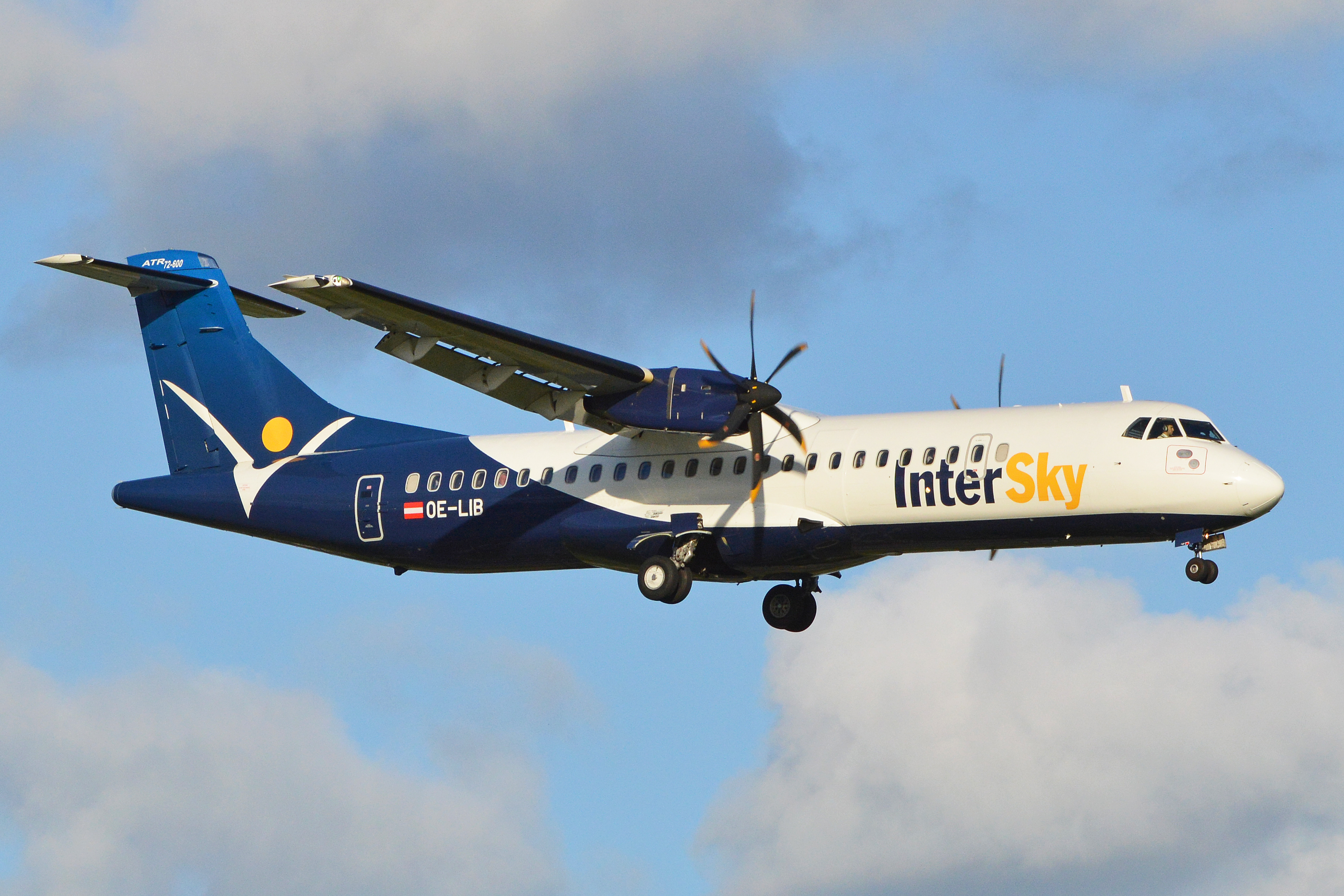
- ATR 72-600
IATA	ICAO	Call sign
3L	ISK	INTERSKY
- Founded: November 2001
- Commenced operations: 25 March 2002
- Ceased operations: 5 November 2015
- Operating bases: Friedrichshafen Airport
- Fleet size: 5
- Destinations: 20
- Headquarters: Bregenz, Austria
- Key people: Roger Hohl (CEO)
- Founders: Rolf Seewald; Renate Moser

InterSky, legally Intersky Luftfahrt GmbH, was an Austrian airline headquartered in Bregenz, which operated scheduled services from its base at Friedrichshafen Airport, Germany, to major cities in Germany, Austria and Switzerland, as well as seasonal holiday flights to the Mediterranean from other airports. The airline ceased operations on the evening of 5 November 2015 due to financial difficulties.

== History ==
=== Early years ===
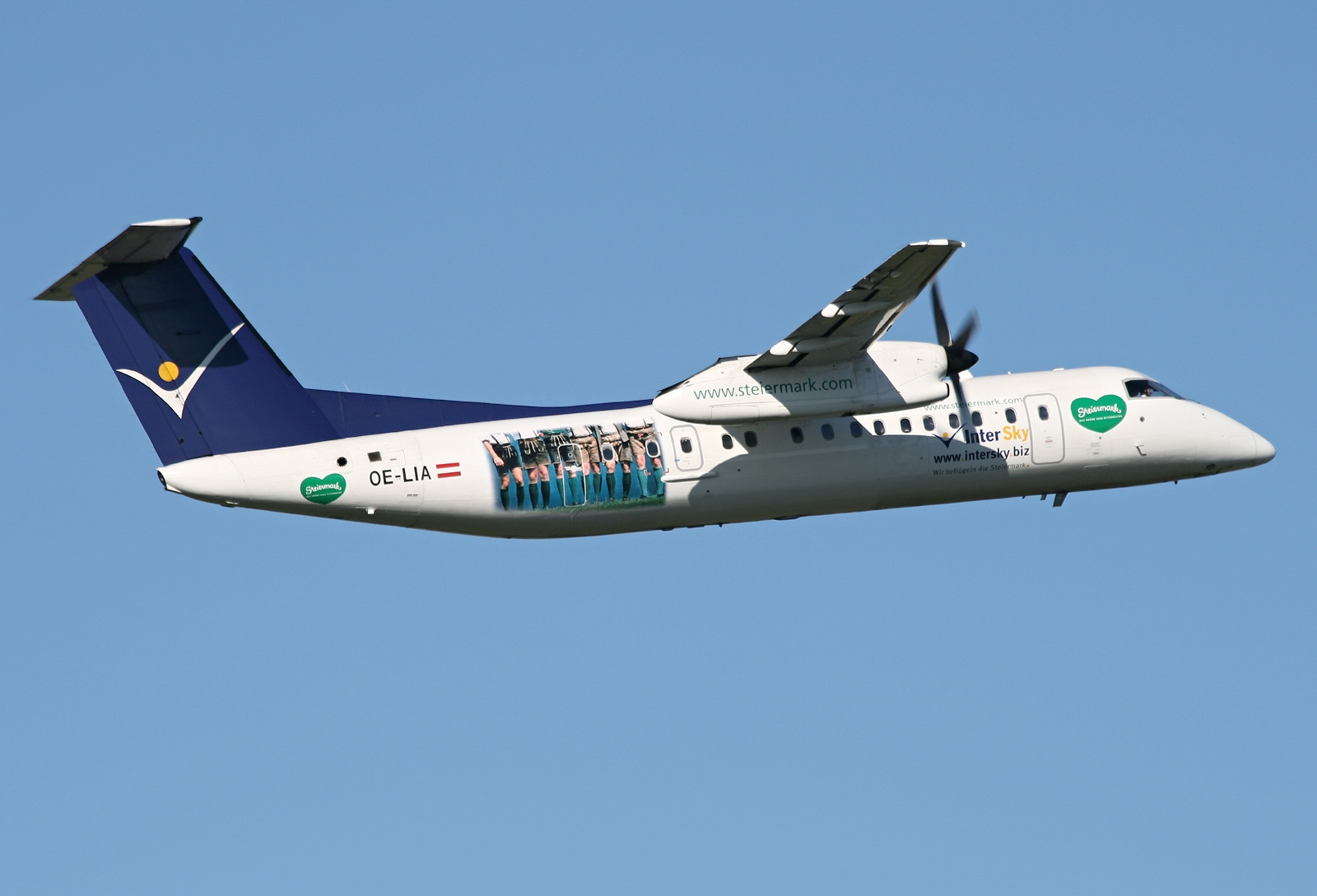
Bombardier DHC-8-300

InterSky was established in November 2001 and started operations on 25 March 2002. At that time the company was owned by Renate Moser (50%), at the time the first female airline CEO, Rolf Seewald (35%), the co-founder and later the owner of Austrian airline Rheintalflug, and other shareholders (15%).

The Bern location came about because then airport director, Charles Riesen, was looking across Europe for an airline that would revitalize the derelict Bern-Belp Airport. The first InterSky flight took place on March 25, 2002. Initially, it began flights between the Swiss federal capital and the cities of Berlin and Vienna.

Supported by the owner Renate Moser, Klaus Bernatzik, who joined the company as CFO in 2003 and previously worked for Rheintalflug and Eurowings, rejected InterSky's previous strategy after suffering major losses in 2002. Following the example of British airline Flybe and under the impression of the low-cost boom that had emerged in Europe, he radically changed the business model. Later on, catering at InterSky was only available against payment and flight tickets were only available via their own website on the Internet. Within a year, the airline was in the black. In accordance with InterSky's claim to sustainable growth, investments were only financed from surpluses - rather unusual for the aviation industry.

InterSky served Berlin Tempelhof Airport right from the start. When it became known that the airport would be closed at the end of 2004, Renate Moser joined several citizens initiatives to keep the airport open. Together with other airlines, she supported a legal dispute that finally guaranteed this until the end of October 2008. InterSky flew to Tempelhof until the end and on the last day before the closure, they conducted several sightseeing flights to say goodbye to the airport together with the employees. An InterSky aircraft was one of the last machines allowed to take off from Tempelhof. On one of the last Tempelhof flights, pilot Viggo Bergers said goodbye in front of hundreds of onlookers with the usual aviation wobble of the wings.

In 2004, after the departure of Hahn Air Lines, InterSky starts relocate its operational base to Friedrichshafen Airport in Germany, which was not fully utilized in Bern. Operations in FDH were profitable from day one, so the airline decided in 2005 to withdraw entirely from Bern and to relocate remaining flight operations to Friedrichshafen. Afterwards, InterSky was the largest airline in Friedrichshafen. In 2010, it was the sixth largest low-fare airline in Germany in terms of flight movements.

In October 2009, the airline transported its millionth passenger. In 2010, InterSky carried 250,000 passengers, more than ever before in the company's history.

As of 2010, the airline had 110 employees. In October 2010, InterSky announced it was ending its long-running route from Friedrichshafen to Cologne due to the heavy competition from Germanwings which had started flying the same route a few months earlier. InterSky also postponed plans to add a fifth aircraft to the fleet.

In July 2011 InterSky announced that Renate Moser and Rolf Seewald were to take over operative management after four years' absence. Claus Bernatzik, Renate Moser's son, left the company by end of the year. In August 2012 it was announced that InterSky had ordered two ATR 72-600s. The two aircraft were scheduled to be delivered in December 2012 and March 2013. These aircraft became the first ATRs to be operated by an Austrian carrier.

In the same month the airline also announced plans to open a new base at Hamburg Airport. The plan was cancelled in October 2012, after OLT Express Germany also announced plans to fly between Karlsruhe/Baden-Baden and Hamburg. Since OLT Express Germany filed for bankruptcy shortly afterwards, InterSky started operating the route in March 2013 on a wet-lease contract with Avanti Air. It stopped flying the route in January 2014 after Germanwings announced plans to start the same route from spring 2014.

=== Final years ===
In May 2015, InterSky announced plans to open its second base at Memmingen Airport by October 2015 consisting of one aircraft, adding a new route to Cologne and increasing frequencies on existing services to Berlin and Hamburg. Later, the plan was changed to use a triangled route Friedrichshafen - Memmingen - Cologne/Bonn instead of basing an aircraft in Memmingen. On 27 October 2015, InterSky announced drastic cuts to their Friedrichshafen-Memmingen-Cologne route which had resumed just three weeks earlier. Instead of two daily flights only two flights a week were to continue due to demand being lower than expected.

In September 2015, it was announced that InterSky was still loss-making and the owner, German investor Intro Aviation, planned to sell the company entirely. All flights from Memmingen Airport and Zürich Airport as well as the Friedrichshafen-Düsseldorf route was terminated in immediate effect. Additionally, InterSky tries to find another usage for their two ATR72-600s whose purchase back in 2013 has been called a mistake. In October 2015, InterSky reported to be in advanced negotiations with a potential investor from Germany willing to pay 5 million Euros for the airline. Shortly after, the Austrian aviation authorities requested InterSky to provide information over their financial security by 5 November 2015. Otherwise their operational license could be revoked. On 4 November 2015, the aforementioned sale agreement fell through. In the same time, InterSky submitted the requested documents regarding their financial security to the Austrian authorities. Shortly after, the airline announced plans to go into administration while maintaining operations.

However, on the evening of 5 November 2015, InterSky announced that they were forced to cease all operations immediately as the lessor of its fleet seized four of the airline's five aircraft - both ATR 72-600s and two Bombardier Dash 8 Q300s - over unpaid leasing charges on short notice. All four aircraft were returned to the lessor immediately, while the remaining one - which was owned by InterSky - operated the last flight from Zürich to Graz. Previously, a potential investor declined to financially support the plans to go into administration.

On 6 November 2015, the airline announced it had filed for insolvency. It has been reported that the airline accumulated around €5 of debt, with several airports being amongst the creditors.

== Destinations ==
InterSky operated scheduled and charter flights to the following destinations as of 5 November 2015:

Austria

- Graz - Graz Airport
- Salzburg - Salzburg Airport

Croatia

- Pula - Pula Airport seasonal
- Zadar - Zadar Airport seasonal

Germany

- Berlin - Berlin Tegel Airport
- Cologne/Bonn - Cologne Bonn Airport
- Düsseldorf - Düsseldorf Airport
- Friedrichshafen - Friedrichshafen Airport base
- Hamburg - Hamburg Airport
- Memmingen - Memmingen Airport focus city
- Munich - Munich Airport seasonal

Greece

- Naxos - Naxos Island National Airport seasonal charter

Italy

- Elba - Marina di Campo Airport seasonal

Spain

- Menorca - Menorca Airport seasonal

Switzerland

- Altenrhein - St. Gallen–Altenrhein Airport seasonal
- Zürich - Zurich Airport

United Kingdom

- Guernsey - Guernsey Airport seasonal charter
- Jersey - Jersey Airport seasonal charter

== Fleet ==
As of 5 November 2015, on its last day of operations, the InterSky fleet consisted of the following aircraft:

Aircraft	In Fleet	Orders	Passengers	Notes
ATR 72-600	2	—	70	returned to the lessor on 5 November 2015
Bombardier Dash 8 Q300	3	—	50	2 returned to the lessor on 5 November 2015
Total	5	—		
