= Friedrichshafen Airport =

Airport in Baden-Württemberg, Germany

Friedrichshafen Airport Flughafen Friedrichshafen

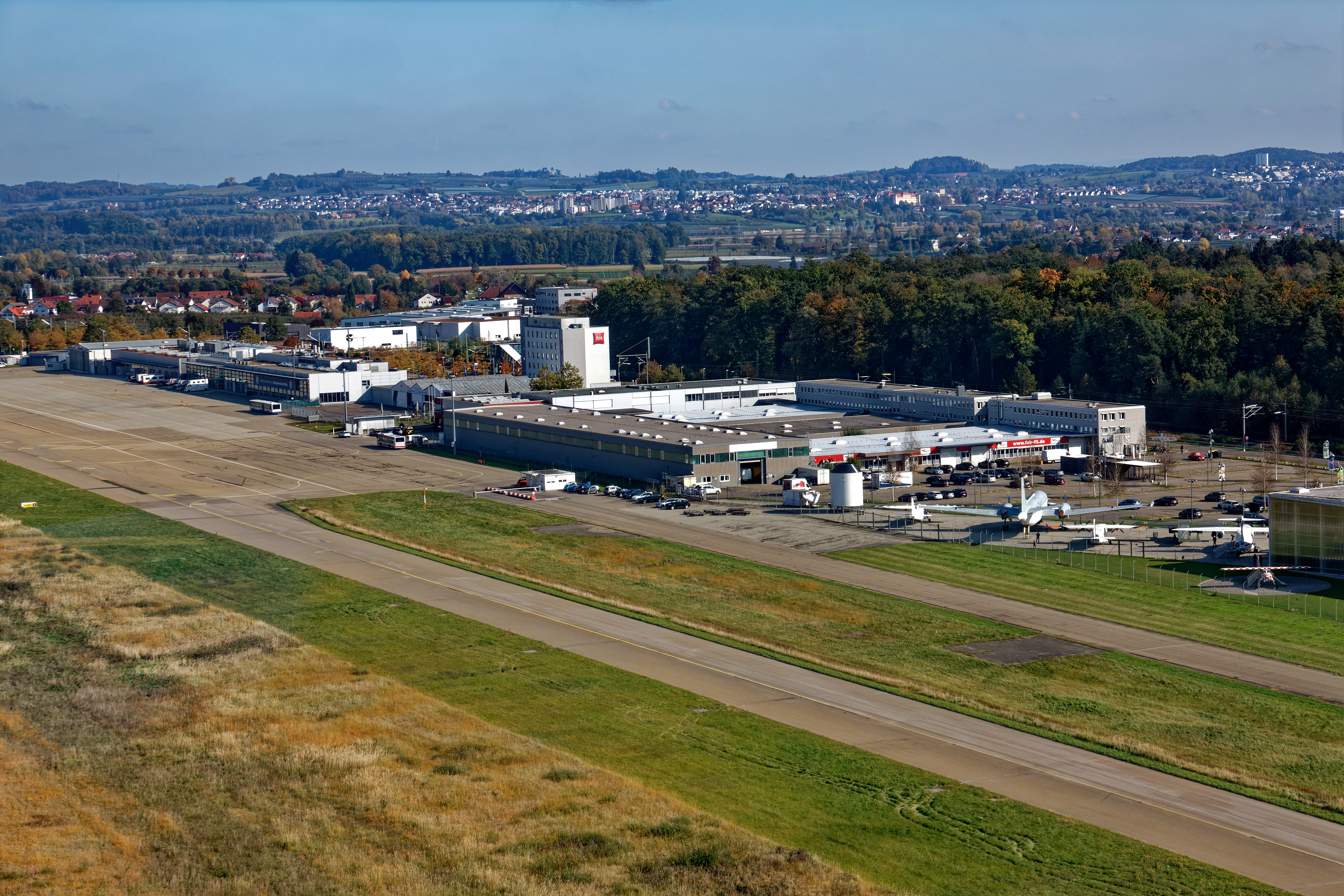
- IATA: FDH; ICAO: EDNY

Summary
- Airport type: Public
- Operator: Flughafen Friedrichshafen GmbH
- Serves: Friedrichshafen, Germany; Lake Constance; Liechtenstein
- Elevation AMSL: 1,358 ft (414 m)
- Coordinates: 47°40′17″N 009°30′41″E
- Website: bodensee-airport.eu

Map
- Location of airport in Baden-Württemberg

Runways
Direction	Length		Surface
Direction	m	ft	Surface
06/24	2,356	7,729	Asphalt

Statistics (2022)
- Passengers: 339,556 ▲+169,8%
- Aircraft movements: 29,105 ▲+32,3%
- Cargo (metric tons): 0 +/-0%
- Sources: Statistics at ADV, AIP at German air traffic control

Friedrichshafen Airport (German: Flughafen Friedrichshafen, IATA: FDH, ICAO: EDNY; also known as Bodensee Airport Friedrichshafen) is a minor international airport 1.9 miles (3 km) north of Friedrichshafen, Germany, on the banks of Lake Constance (German: Bodensee). It is the third biggest airport in the German state of Baden-Württemberg after Stuttgart and Karlsruhe/Baden-Baden and served 559,985 passengers in 2015. Friedrichshafen features flights to European metropolitan and leisure destinations. Due to its proximity to the Austrian Alps it is also heavily used during the winter by skiing tourists.

The Messe Friedrichshafen convention center is just north of the airport's runway. The center hosts AERO Friedrichshafen, an annual European general aviation conference and other conferences.

== History ==
=== Early years ===
This airport was established at Löwental, north-east of Friedrichshafen in 1915 when the first hangars were constructed. The first scheduled passenger flights with Zeppelin airships started from here, long before they were relocated to Frankfurt/Zeppelinheim.

Friedrichshafen saw its first scheduled passenger flights in 1929 with Deutsche Luft Hansa services to Stuttgart-Böblingen Airport. By 1935 the flights were being made in Junkers Ju 52 passenger aircraft. Important engineering firms such as Maybach and Zahnradfabrik Friedrichshafen (ZF), subsidiaries of Luftschiffbau Zeppelin, were also founded in Friedrichshafen. During World War 2, their engines and gearboxes for tanks were flown directly from the airport to e.g. Kharkov, to replenish much-needed supplies during the Battle of Kursk.

Delta Air established the first successful post-war regional flights in 1978, flying to Stuttgart and Zürich. A new terminal building and runway were built between 1988 and 1994. Another new terminal was opened in 2010.

=== Development since the 2000s ===
InterSky, based at the airport, shut down its key route to Cologne Bonn Airport, which it had operated for seven years, in October 2010 due to tough competition from Germanwings which started flying the same route in spring 2010. Germanwings closed the route on 14 June 2015.

On 5 November 2015, InterSky ceased all operations due to financial difficulties, leading to the termination of domestic connections to Berlin, Hamburg, Cologne and Düsseldorf. In December 2015, it was announced that the airport might need financial support from its majority owners—the city of Friedrichshafen and the surrounding county—as the shutdown of InterSky—one of the airport's largest customers—led to financial difficulties. Also in December 2015, VLM Airlines announced it would base three aircraft in Friedrichshafen to take over the domestic routes to Berlin, Düsseldorf and Hamburg previously provided by InterSky. However, VLM went bankrupt in June 2016, leaving these routes abandoned again.

In 2019, Sun-Air of Scandinavia, a franchisee of British Airways announced routes from Friedrichshafen to Düsseldorf, Hamburg and Toulouse with only the Düsseldorf service remaining in 2021, partly due to the COVID-19 pandemic. In March 2024, Lufthansa terminated its flights to Frankfurt, leaving Friedrichshafen without domestic connections.

== Facilities ==
The airport consists of one passenger terminal building with seven departure gates (A-G) as well as some shops and restaurants. The apron consists of seven aircraft stands; there are no jet bridges. The terminal building also features office space and an observation deck called the ON TOP terrace. The airport also features an airship hangar as well as general aviation facilities.

The airport was previously the base of InterSky, an Austrian regional airline which is now defunct. A museum dedicated to Dornier Flugzeugwerke, a German aircraft manufacturer, is located next to the terminal.

== Airlines and destinations ==
The following airlines operate regular scheduled and charter flights at Friedrichshafen Airport:

Airlines	Destinations
Air Anka	Seasonal Charter: Antalya (begins 23 October 2026)
Air Seven	Seasonal charter: Copenhagen
Air Uniqon (operated by Avanti Air)	Berlin, Düsseldorf, Hamburg
AlbaStar	Seasonal charter: Palma de Mallorca
Avanti Air	Seasonal charter: Calvi, Preveza/Lefkada
Aegean Airlines	Seasonal charter: Heraklion, Rhodes
Condor	Seasonal: Heraklion, Palma de Mallorca
Corendon Airlines	Seasonal: Antalya, Hurghada
easyJet	Seasonal: London-Gatwick; Seasonal charter: Belfast-International
Freebird Airlines	Seasonal: Antalya, Heraklion
MHS Aviation	Seasonal: Elba, Heringsdorf
Norwegian Air Shuttle	Seasonal charter: Copenhagen
Ryanair	Seasonal: Alicante, Palma de Mallorca, Zadar (begins 3 May 2027)
Wizz Air	Sarajevo (begins 27 February 2027), Skopje

The nearest larger international airports are Zurich Airport, located 101 km (63 mi) south west and Stuttgart Airport, located 180 km (112 mi) north west of Friedrichshafen Airport.

== Statistics ==
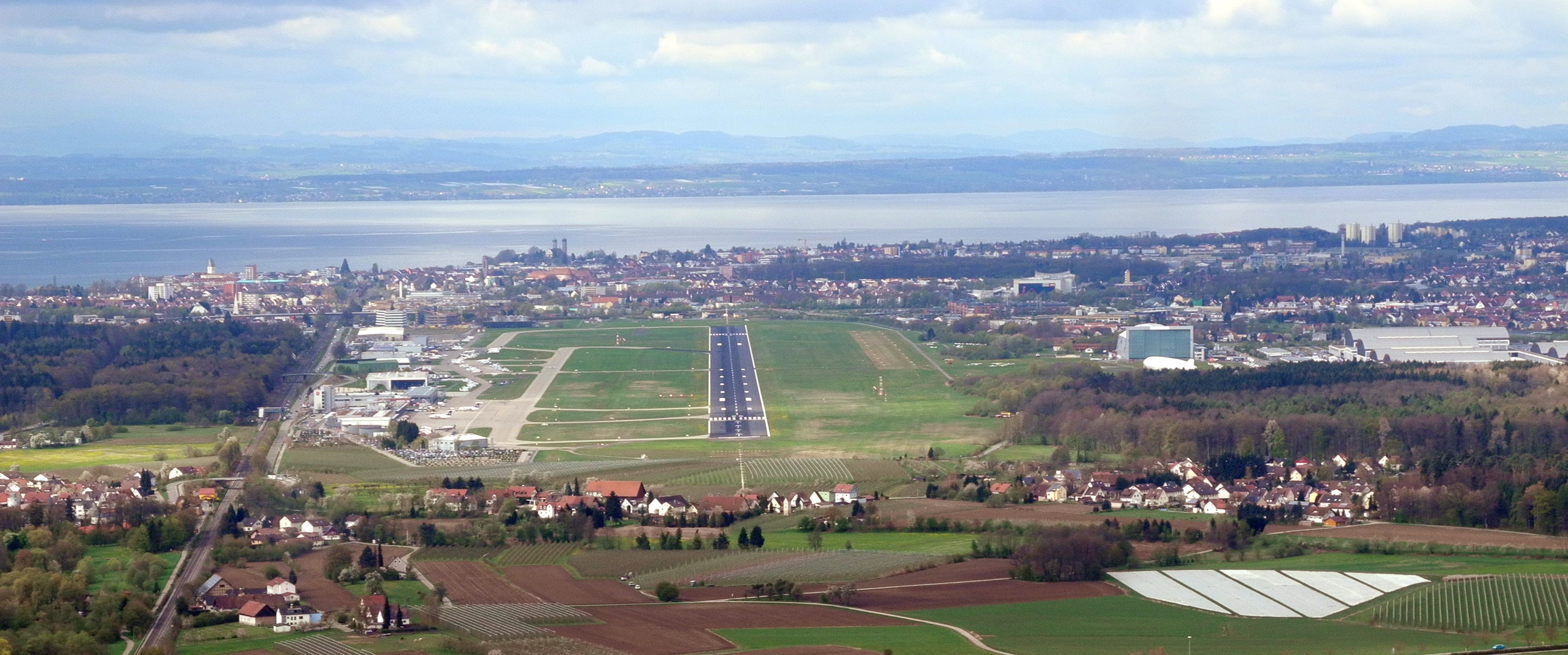
Aerial view of Friedrichshafen Airport with Lake Constance in the background

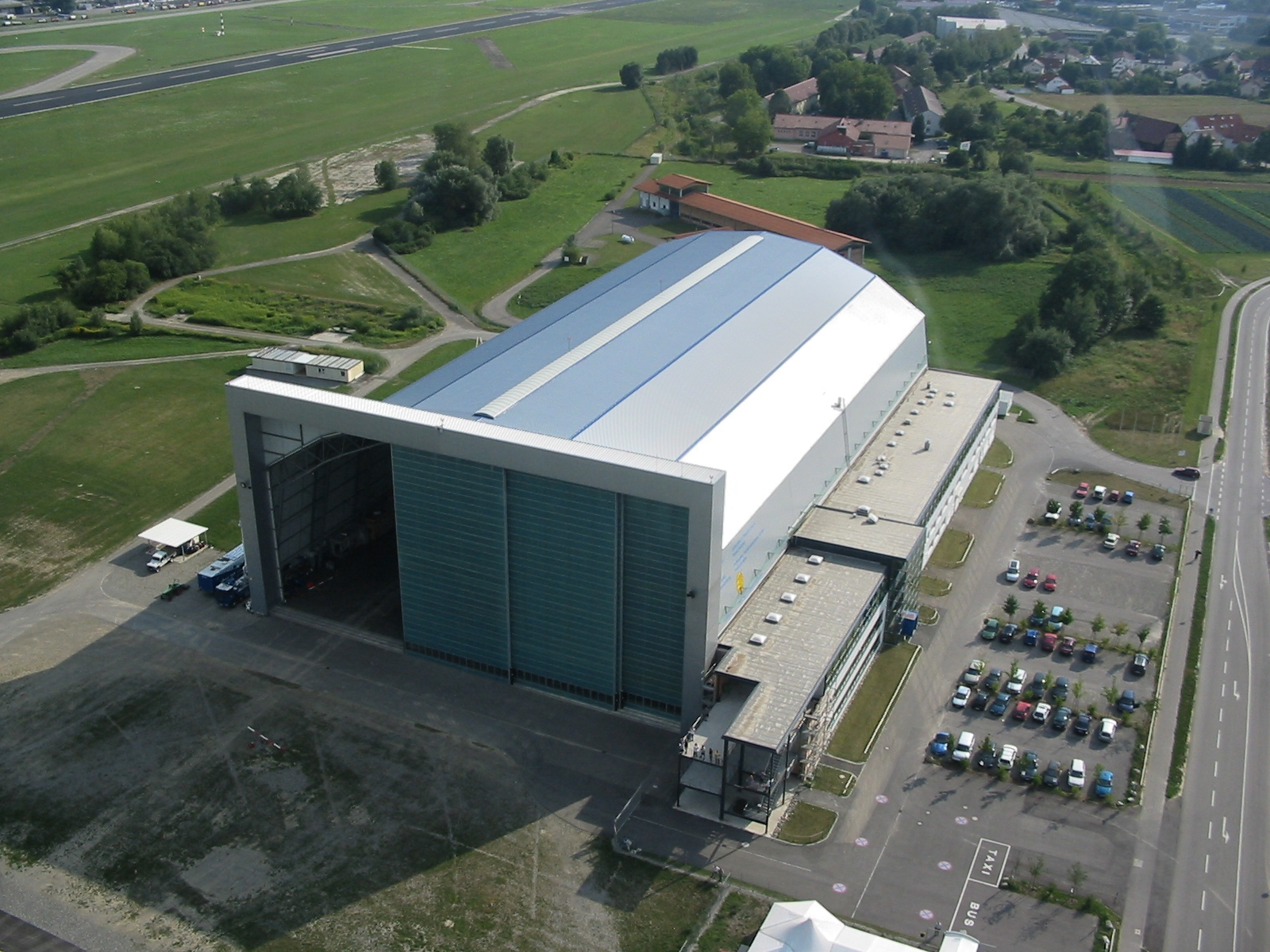
Airship hangar at the airport

Year	Passengers
2008	649,646
2009	▼578,484
2010	▲590,640
2011	▼571,709
2012	▼545,121
2013	▼536,029
2014	▲596,000
2015	▼559,985
2016	▼520,000
2017	▼517,299
2018	▲539,698
2019	▼489,921
2020	▼119,040
2021	▲125,841
2022	▲339,556
Source: ADV

== Ground transportation ==
=== Car ===
Friedrichshafen can be reached from all directions via federal highways B30 and B31 which are connected to several motorways such as the A96 from Munich or the A13/A14 from Austria and Switzerland. The airport is signposted throughout the city. Taxis and rental car agencies are available at the terminal building.

=== Train ===
Friedrichshafen Airport has its own small railway station named Friedrichshafen Flughafen directly across from the terminal building. It is regularly served by local Bodensee-Oberschwaben-Bahn trains, which continue to the city center and the port of Friedrichshafen or the near town, Aulendorf.

Preceding station	Bodensee-Oberschwaben-Bahn	Following station
Kehlen towards Aulendorf	RB 91	Löwental towards Friedrichshafen Hafen

== See also ==
- Transport in Germany
- List of airports in Germany
