= Jagdbombergeschwader 34 =

Inactive unit of the German Air Force

Fighter-Bomber Wing 34
- Jagdbombergeschwader 34 "Allgäu"
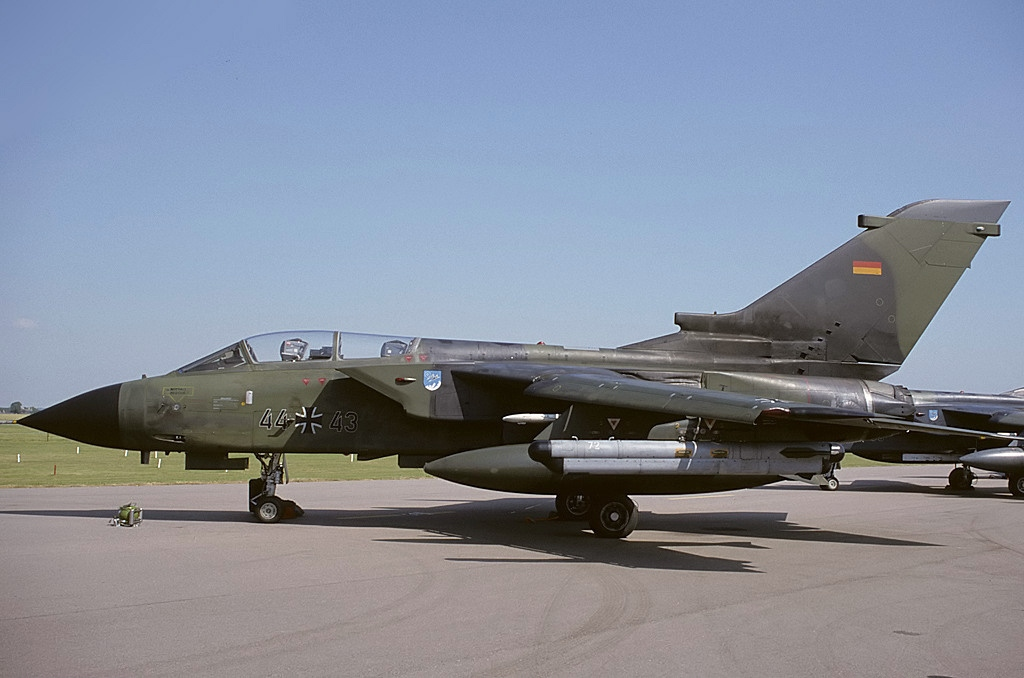
- One of the wing's Panavia Tornados at RAF Cottesmore during RIAT in 2000
- Active: 29 November 1958 – 30 June 2003 (44 years, 7 months)
- Country: Germany
- Branch: German Air Force
- Role: Ground Attack
- Part of: 1. Luftwaffendivision; (German: 1st Air Force Division)
- Garrison/HQ: Memmingen Air Base, Germany
- Decorations: Bavaria streamer (1988)

Commanders
- Last commander: Oberst Norbert Geissendörfer

Insignia
- Fighter-Bomber Wing 34 emblem

Jagdbombergeschwader 34 "Allgäu" (Fighter-Bomber Wing 34; abbreviated as JaboG 34) was a fighter-bomber wing of the German Air Force (Luftwaffe). The wing was based at Memmingen Air Base until its deactivation in 2003. The wing last flew the Panavia Tornado IDS.

== History ==
The wing was first established on 29 November 1958, initially at Faßberg Air Base, until it was re-located to Memmingen Air Base the next year. The wing's first aircraft was the Republic F-84F Thunderstreak, which it flew until 1964. On 1 July 1964, the wing transitioned to the Lockheed F-104G Starfighter and was made a subordinate of the 1. Luftwaffendivision (1st Air Force Division) that same year. In March 1987, the unit began the transition to the Panavia Tornado IDS. In 1992 the wing received its byname, "Allgäu", the name of the region the unit was stationed in. On 30 June 2003, the wing was inactivated.

== Nuclear sharing ==
Throughout the Cold War, the wing had a dual task, both conventional and nuclear attack. As part of the nuclear sharing program, US nuclear weapons were stored at Memmingen Air Base, serviced, guarded, and in case of war activated by a US Air Force munitions support squadron (MUNSS). This was the case until 1996, when the weapons were withdrawn from the base, leaving Jagdbombergeschwader 33 at Büchel Air Base as the last unit in the German Air Force capable of delivering nuclear weapons.
