= Italy First (airline) =

Regional charter airline based in Rimini, Italy

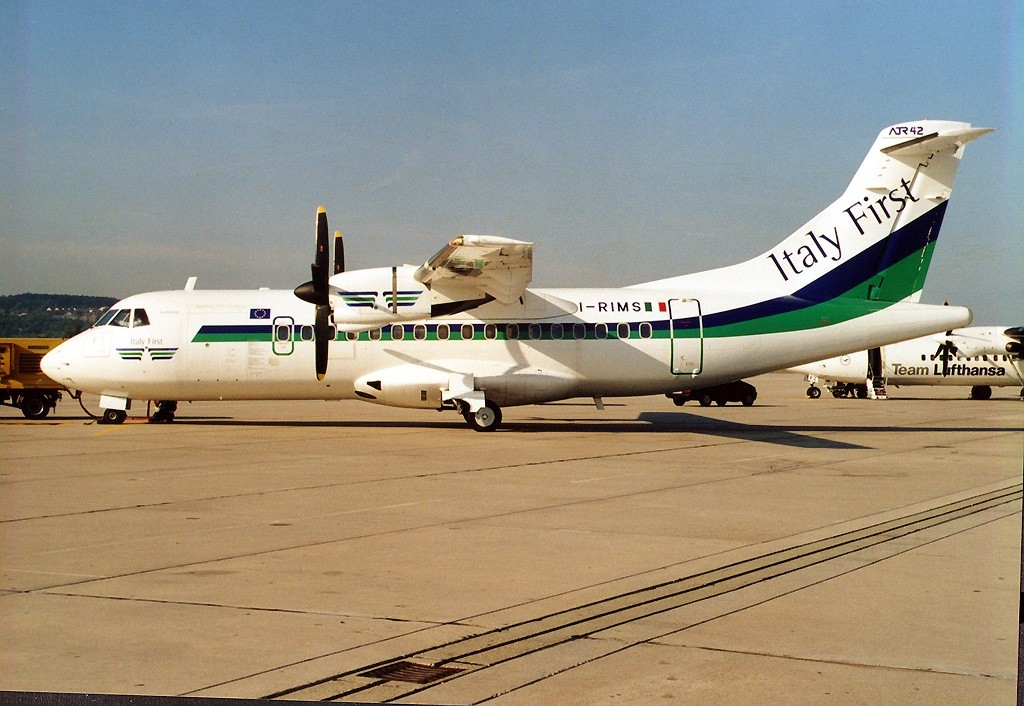
- ATR-42
IATA	ICAO	Call sign
IF	IFS	RIVIERA
- Founded: 1999
- Ceased operations: 2005
- Hubs: Miramare Airport
- Fleet size: 2
- Headquarters: Rimini, Italy
- Website: www.italyfirst.it

Italy First was a regional charter airline based in Rimini in Italy founded on December 19, 1996. It was 100% owned by Gruppo Condor, a strong and well-established tour operator specialized in the resale of third-party unsold all-inclusive packages. Its main base was Miramare Airport, inside Rimini municipality. The first operations started in August 1999 with schedules to Rome, and from Alghero to Bologna, Genoa, Pisa. It also operated air taxi and air ambulance services. After operating on ACMI basis for Meridiana, Alpi Eagles, Minerva, and finally Air One, at the end of 2005, the management sold the airplanes and retired from flight operations.

== Fleet ==
Italy First's fleet was made up of two regional aircraft:

Aircraft	Total	Introduced	Retired
ATR 42–320	2	1999	2006
