= Icejet =

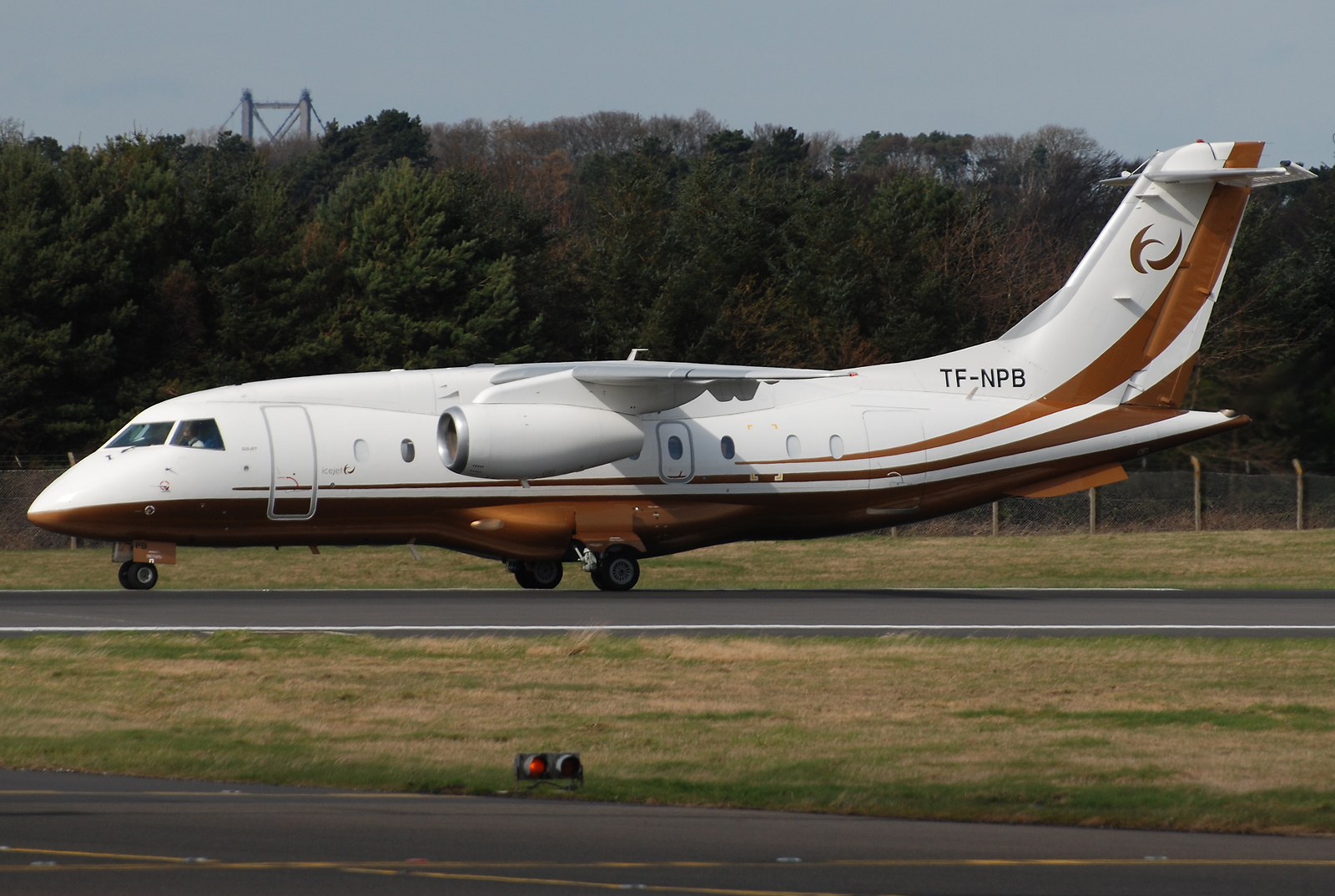
- Fairchild Dornier 328JET
IATA	ICAO	Call sign
—	ICJ	ICEJET
- Founded: 2005
- Ceased operations: 2010
- Fleet size: 3
- Destinations: charter
- Headquarters: Reykjavík, Iceland
- Website: icejet.is

Icejet was a charter airline based in Iceland and was the only business jet operator based in the nation. It was founded in 2005 and ceased flights in August 2010. The airline was a JAR-OPS (Joint Aviation Requirement) operator.

== Fleet ==
Icejet operated the following fleet:

- 3 Fairchild Dornier 328JET
  - 2 in a 14-seat VIP (Envoy) configuration which had extended range modifications
  - 1 in a 19-seat (Corporate Shuttle) configuration
