= Avanti Air =

German airline

Coordinates: 50.70531°N 8.073852°E

IATA	ICAO	Call sign
4A	ATV	AVANTI AIR
- Founded: 1994
- Hubs: Siegerland Airport
- Fleet size: 2
- Headquarters: Haiger, Germany
- Key people: Markus Baumann; Stefan Kissinger
- Website: avantiair.com

Avanti Air GmbH & Co. KG, styled as avantiair, is a small German airline based in Haiger with a maintenance base at Siegerland Airport, operating ad hoc charter and aircraft wet-lease services.

== History ==
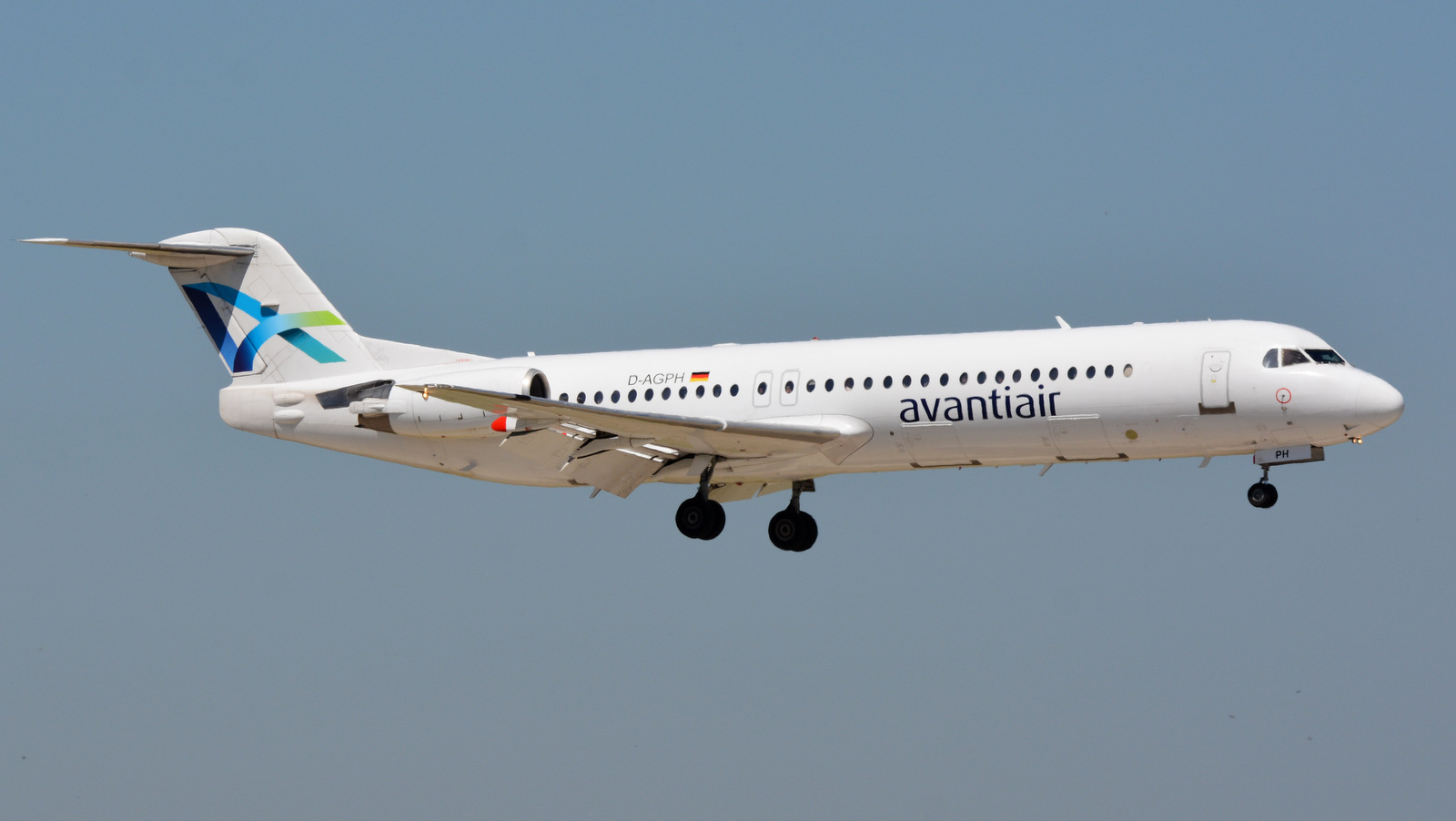
A former Avanti Air Fokker 100

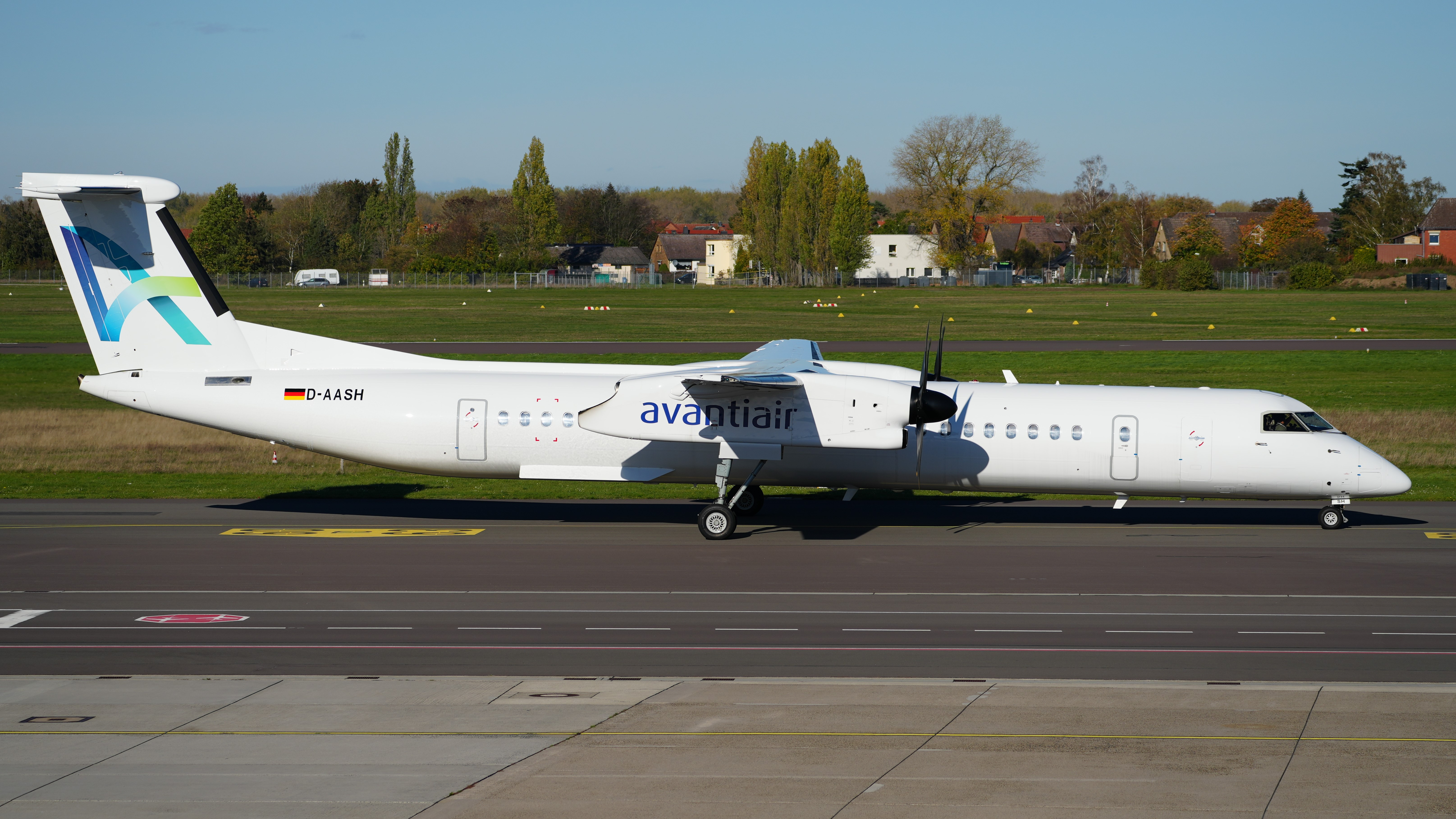
Avanti Air De Havilland Canada Dash 8-400

Avanti Air (named after the Italian word for ahead) started operations on 1 July 1994. It was founded by former pilots Markus Baumann (now managing director) and Stefan Kissinger (now chief executive) as an aircraft management company. It entered the charter market in 1996 with two Raytheon Beech 1900C aircraft.

As of 2007, the company was owned by Gerhard Mahler (33,33%), Markus Baumann (33,33%) and Stefan Kissinger (33,33%) and had 73 employees.

In autumn 2014, Avanti Air introduced the Fokker 100 to its charter fleet alongside a new corporate design. In November 2015, the airline phased out their last ATR72 aircraft in favour of a second Fokker 100 and therefore becoming an all-jet operator. However, in October 2021 the airline exchanged their Fokker 100s for a sole De Havilland Canada Dash 8.

Since February 2026, the airline has been operating flights for Air Uniqon, a virtual airline founded in 2025 and based in Rüthnick. These flights connect Friedrichshafen Airport to Berlin Brandenburg Airport, Düsseldorf Airport, and Hamburg Airport.

== Operations ==
Avanti Air offers charter and wetlease operations on long- and short-term basis to other airlines and tour operators as well as ad hoc charter services, e. g. for VIPs.

== Fleet ==
As of July 2026, Avanti Air operates the following aircraft:

Avanti Air fleet
Aircraft	In service	Passengers	Notes
De Havilland Canada Dash 8-400	2	78	
Total	2		

=== Former fleet ===
As of August 2025, Avanti Air operated 2 De Havilland Caanada DHC-8-Q400

== Accidents and incidents ==
- On 19 February 1999 on 21:48 local time, an Avanti Air Beechcraft 1900D on a ferry flight from Düsseldorf to Frankfurt without any passengers on board was substantially damaged when the two pilots attempted to land at Frankfurt Airport even though the landing gear was accidentally still retracted.
