= List of the busiest airports in Italy =

This is a list of the busiest commercial airports in Italy by number of passengers. Annual data are linked from an Assaeroporti (Association of Italian Airport Management Companies) Web page.

== 2025 ==
Rank	Airport	Region	Passengers	Annual % change
1	Rome-Fiumicino	Lazio	50,839,575	+4.5
2	Milan-Malpensa	Lombardy	31,220,874	+8.7
3	Milan-Bergamo	Lombardy	16,929,291	-2.4
4	Napoli Capodichino	Campania	13,246,940	+4.9
5	Catania Fontanarossa	Sicily	12,355,890	+0.2
6	Venice Tessera	Veneto	11,825,932	+2.2
7	Bologna Borgo Panigale	Emilia-Romagna	11,199,126	+3.3
8	Milan-Linate	Lombardy	11,076,022	+4.5
9	Palermo Punta Raisi	Sicily	9,239,472	+3.3
10	Bari Palese Macchie	Apulia	7,986,287	+9.7
11	Pisa S. Giusto	Tuscany	5,931,881	+7.8
12	Cagliari Elmas	Sardinia	5,282,715	+1.7
13	Turin Caselle	Piedmont	5,032,138	+6.7
14	Olbia	Sardinia	4,128,462	+7.2
15	Verona Villafranca	Veneto	4,001,674	+8.7
16	Rome-Ciampino	Lazio	3,950,964	+3.2
17	Firenze Peretola	Tuscany	3,822,446	+9.5
18	Brindisi Casale	Apulia	3,447,248	+1.6
19	Treviso S. Angelo	Veneto	3,195,290	+5.0
20	Lamezia Terme	Calabria	3,070,934	+12.3
21	Alghero–Fertilia	Sardinia	1,768,135	+9.9
22	Trieste Ronchi dei Legionari	Friuli-Venezia Giulia	1,647,971	+25.2
23	Genova Sestri	Liguria	1,580,283	+18.2
24	Trapani Birgi	Sicily	1,013,124	-6.2
25	Pescara	Abruzzo	994,820	+26.2
26	Reggio Calabria	Calabria	987,381	+56.7
27	Perugia	Umbria	622,203	+16.3
28	Ancona Falconara	Marche	600,787	+0.9
29	Rimini Miramare	Emilia-Romagna	417,695	+29.9
30	Salerno Pontecagnano	Campania	370,241	+112.1
31	Lampedusa	Sicily	358,482	+2.4
32	Crotone	Calabria	344,039	+24.3
33	Pantelleria	Sicily	211,580	+4.0
34	Parma	Emilia-Romagna	142,795	+8.6
35	Comiso	Sicily	134,466	-48.7
36	Bolzano	Trentino-Alto Adige	122,601	+26.7
37	Forlì	Emilia-Romagna	117,053	-11.7
38	Cuneo Levaldigi	Piedmont	97,673	-4.4
39	Foggia	Apulia	68,870	+13.3
40	Marina di Campo	Tuscany	4,688	+230.1
41	Brescia Montichiari	Lombardy	1,463	+46.2
42	Taranto Grottaglie	Apulia	2	0
Total			229,389,513	+5.0

== 2024 ==
Rank	Airport	Region	Total passengers	Annual change
1	Rome-Fiumicino	Lazio	49.203.734	+21,4
2	Milan-Malpensa	Lombardy	28.910.368	+10,9
3	Milan-Bergamo	Lombardy	17.353.573	+8,6
4	Naples	Campania	12.650.478	+2,1
5	Catania	Sicily	12.346.530	+15
6	Venice	Veneto	11.590.356	+2,3
7	Bologna	Emilia-Romagna	10.775.972	+8,1
8	Milan-Linate	Lombardy	10.650.990	+13
9	Palermo	Sicily	8.921.833	+10,1
10	Bari	Apulia	7.273.141	+12,3
11	Pisa	Tuscany	5.547.008	+8,6
12	Cagliari	Sardinia	5.161.212	+6,3
13	Turin	Piedmont	4.693.977	+3,6
14	Olbia	Sardinia	3.883.235	+18,3
15	Rome-Ciampino	Lazio	3.861.806	-0,6
16	Verona	Veneto	3.704.582	+7,8
17	Florence	Tuscany	3.516.925	+14,3
18	Brindisi-Salento	Apulia	3.385.610	+6,6
19	Treviso	Veneto	3.048.943	+0,5
20	Lamezia Terme	Calabria	2.713.811	-4,4
21	Alghero	Sardinia	1.611.625	+7,9
22	Genoa	Liguria	1.335.095	+4,3
23	Trieste	Friuli-Venezia Giulia	1.319.813	+41,5
24	Trapani	Sicily	1.075.411	-19,3
25	Pescara	Abruzzo	847.512	-2,9
26	Reggio Calabria	Calabria	623.980	+112,8
27	Ancona	Marche	600.065	+15,8
28	Perugia	Umbria	534.210	+0,3
29	Lampedusa	Sicily	349.449	+3
30	Rimini	Emilia-Romagna	321.552	+14,1
31	Crotone	Calabria	273.250	+19,8
32	Comiso	Sicily	260.438	-14,2
33	Pantelleria	Sicily	204.213	
34	Salerno	Campania	179.123	+100
35	Parma	Emilia-Romagna	133.757	-0,2
36	Forlì	Emilia-Romagna	133.110	-1,4
37	Bolzano	Trentino-Alto Adige	106.629	+27,4
38	Cuneo	Piedmont	105.428	-7,4
39	Foggia	Apulia	62.149	+28,1
40	Brescia	Lombardy	8.662	-1,9
41	Grosseto	Tuscany	2.271	-44,2
42	Taranto	Apulia	1.005	-10
Total			219.078.618	+11,1

== 2023 ==
Rank	Airport	Region	Total passengers	Annual change%
1	Rome-Fiumicino	Lazio	40 545 240	+38,1
2	Milan-Malpensa	Lombardy	26 076 714	+22,2
3	Milan-Bergamo	Lombardy	15 974 451	+21,4
4	Naples	Campania	12 394 911	+13,5
5	Venice	Veneto	11 326 212	+21,5
6	Catania	Sicily	10 739 614	+6,3
7	Bologna	Emilia-Romagna	9 970 284	+17,4
8	Milan-Linate	Lombardy	9 426 784	+22,1
9	Palermo	Sicily	8 103 024	+13,8
10	Bari	Apulia	6 474 463	+5,1
11	Pisa	Tuscany	5 109 682	+13,7
12	Cagliari	Sardinia	4 853 113	+10,4
13	Turin	Piedmont	4 531 185	+8
14	Rome-Ciampino	Lazio	3 884 689	+11,8
15	Verona	Veneto	3 436 843	+15,3
16	Olbia	Sardinia	3 281 626	+3,6
17	Brindisi-Salento	Apulia	3 176 143	+3,6
18	Florence	Tuscany	3 077 917	+38,1
19	Treviso	Veneto	3 034 326	+15,1
20	Lamezia Terme	Calabria	2 839 441	+8,3
21	Alghero	Sardinia	1 494 256	-2,6
22	Trapani	Sicily	1 332 860	+49,5
23	Genoa	Liguria	1 279 445	+4,6
24	Trieste	Friuli-Venezia Giulia	932 767	+33,5
25	Pescara	Abruzzo	872 701	+21,9
26	Perugia	Umbria	532 478	+44,2
27	Ancona	Marche	518 009	+10,8
28	Lampedusa	Sicily	339 266	+3,3
29	Comiso	Sicily	303 414	-16,8
30	Reggio Calabria	Calabria	293 261	+44,9
31	Rimini	Emilia-Romagna	281 864	+31,2
32	Crotone	Calabria	228 095	+33,5
33	Pantelleria	Sicily	200.346	+11,5
34	Forlì	Emilia-Romagna	134 978	+42,7
35	Parma	Emilia-Romagna	134 088	+14,9
36	Cuneo	Piedmont	113 793	-29
37	Bolzano	Trentino-Alto Adige	83 671	+26,4
38	Foggia	Apulia	48 502	+588,1
39	Brescia	Lombardy	8 831	+21,9
40	Grosseto	Tuscany	4 071	-26,1
41	Taranto	Apulia	1 117	+3,1
42	Salerno	Campania		
Total			197 194 129	+19,8

== 2022 ==
Rank	Airport	Serves	Total passengers
1	Rome Leonardo da Vinci-Fiumicino	Rome	29,360,613
2	Milan Malpensa	Milan	21,347,652
3	Orio al Serio	Milan, Bergamo	13,155,806
4	Naples	Naples	10,918,234
5	Catania	Catania	10,099,441
6	Venice Marco Polo	Venice	9,319,156
7	Bologna	Bologna	8,496,000
8	Milan Linate	Milan	7,719,977
9	Palermo	Palermo	7,117,822
10	Bari	Bari	6,205,461
11	Pisa	Pisa	4,493,847
12	Cagliari	Cagliari	4,396,594
13	Turin	Turin	4,193,371
14	Rome Ciampino	Rome	3,475,902
15	Olbia	Olbia	3,167,368
16	Brindisi	Brindisi	3,065,962
17	Verona	Verona	2,982,060
18	Treviso	Treviso	2,635,172
19	Lamezia Terme	Lamezia Terme	2,622,535
20	Florence	Florence	2,228,999
21	Alghero	Alghero	1,533,427
22	Genoa	Genoa	1,222,888
23	Trapani	Trapani	891,670
24	Pescara	Pescara	715,690
25	Trieste	Trieste	698,613
26	Ancona	Ancona	467,622
27	Perugia	Perugia	369,222
28	Comiso	Ragusa	364,735
29	Lampedusa	Lampedusa	328,576
30	Rimini	Rimini	214,851
31	Reggio Calabria	Reggio Calabria	202,386
32	Crotone	Crotone	170,898
33	Cuneo	Cuneo	160,189
34	Parma	Parma	116,720
35	Forlì	Forlì	94,610
36	Bolzano	Bolzano	66,179
37	Brescia	Brescia	7,245
38	Foggia	Foggia	7,049
39	Grosseto	Grosseto	5,511
40	Taranto	Taranto	1,083
Total			164,641,136

== 2020 ==
Rank	Airport	Serves	Total passengers	Annual change	Rank change
1	Rome Leonardo da Vinci-Fiumicino	Rome	9,830,957	▼ -77.4%	Steady
2	Milan Malpensa	Milan	7,241,766	▼ -74.9%	Steady
3	Orio al Serio	Bergamo, Milan	3,833,063	▼ -73.3%	Steady
4	Catania	Catania	3,654,457	▼ -64.3%	▲2
5	Venice Marco Polo	Venice	2,799,688	▼ -75.8%	▼1
6	Naples	Naples	2,779,946	▼ -74.4%	▼1
7	Palermo	Palermo	2,701,519	▼ -61.5%	Steady
8	Bologna	Bologna	2,506,258	▼ -73.4%	Steady
9	Milan Linate	Milan	2,274,202	▼ -65.4%	Steady
10	Cagliari	Cagliari	1,767,890	▼ -62.8%	▲3
11	Bari	Bari	1,703,130	▼ -69.3%	Steady
12	Rome Ciampino	Rome	1,621,159	▼ -72.4%	▼2
13	Turin	Turin	1,407,375	▼ -64.4%	▲1
14	Pisa	Pisa	1,315,066	▼ -75.6%	▼2
15	Verona	Verona	1,040,555	▼ -71.4%	Steady
16	Treviso	Treviso		▼	Steady
17	Olbia	Olbia		▼	Steady
18	Lamezia Terme	Lamezia Terme		▼	Steady
19	Florence	Florence		▼	Steady
20	Brindisi	Brindisi		▼	Steady
21	Genoa	Genoa		▼	Steady
22	Alghero	Alghero		▼	Steady
23	Trieste	Trieste		▼	Steady
24	Pescara	Pescara		▼	Steady
25	Ancona	Ancona		▼	Steady
26	Trapani	Trapani		▼	Steady
27	Rimini	Rimini		▼	Steady
28	Reggio Calabria	Reggio Calabria		▼	Steady
29	Comiso	Ragusa		▼	Steady
30	Lampedusa	Lampedusa		▼	Steady
31	Perugia	Perugia		▼	Steady
32	Crotone	Crotone		▼	Steady
33	Cuneo	Cuneo		▼	Steady
34	Parma	Parma		▼	Steady
35	Brescia	Brescia		▼	Steady
36	Bolzano	Bolzano		▼	Steady
37	Grosseto	Grosseto		▼	Steady
38	Taranto	Taranto		▼	Steady
39	Foggia	Foggia		▼	Steady
Total				▼	

== 2019 ==
Rank	Airport	Serves	Total passengers	Annual change	Rank change
1	Rome Leonardo da Vinci-Fiumicino	Rome	43,532,573	▲1.3%	Steady
2	Milan Malpensa	Milan	28,846,299	▲16.7%	Steady
3	Orio al Serio	Bergamo	13,857,257	▲7.1%	Steady
4	Venice Marco Polo	Venice	11,561,594	▲3.4%	Steady
5	Naples	Naples	10,860,068	▲9.3%	▲1
6	Catania	Catania	10,223,113	▲2.9%	▼1
7	Bologna	Bologna	9,405,920	▲10.6%	▲1
8	Palermo	Palermo	7,018,087	▲5.9%	▲1
9	Milan Linate	Milan	6,570,984	▼28.8%	▼2
10	Rome Ciampino	Rome	5,879,496	▲0.7%	Steady
11	Bari	Bari	5,545,588	▲10.2%	▲1
12	Pisa	Pisa	5,387,558	▼1.4%	▼1
13	Cagliari	Cagliari	4,747,806	▲8.6%	Steady
14	Turin	Turin	3,952,158	▼3.3%	Steady
15	Verona	Verona	3,638,088	▲5.2%	Steady
16	Treviso	Treviso	3,254,731	▼1.6%	Steady
17	Olbia	Olbia	2,978,769	▼0.7%	Steady
18	Lamezia Terme	Lamezia Terme	2,978,110	▲8.1%	Steady
19	Florence	Florence	2,874,233	▲5.7%	Steady
20	Brindisi	Brindisi	2,697,749	▲8.8%	Steady
21	Genoa	Genoa	1,536,136	▲5.5%	Steady
22	Alghero	Alghero	1,390,379	▲1.8%	Steady
23	Trieste	Trieste	783,179	▲1.4%	Steady
24	Pescara	Pescara	703,386	▲5.5%	Steady
25	Ancona	Ancona	489,835	▲8.2%	▲1
26	Trapani	Trapani	411,437	▼14.4%	▼1
27	Rimini	Rimini	395,194	▲28.3%	▲2
28	Reggio Calabria	Reggio Calabria	365,391	▲2.0%	Steady
29	Comiso	Ragusa	352,095	▼17.1%	▼2
30	Lampedusa	Lampedusa	276,972	▲2.6%	Steady
31	Perugia	Perugia	219,183	▼1.9%	Steady
32	Crotone	Crotone	169,780	▲102.5%	▲1
33	Cuneo	Cuneo	92,401	▼19.1%	▼1
34	Parma	Parma	75,007	▼5.1%	Steady
35	Brescia	Brescia	17,003	▲98.0%	▲2
36	Bolzano	Bolzano	10,780	▼41.7%	▼1
37	Grosseto	Grosseto	3,035	▼71.3%	▼1
38	Taranto	Taranto	899	▲146.3%	▲1
39	Foggia	Foggia	387	▼25.9%	▼1
Total			193,102,660	▲4.0%	

== 2018 ==
Rank	Airport	Serves	Total passengers	Annual change	Rank change
1	Rome Leonardo da Vinci-Fiumicino	Rome	42,995,119	▲4.9%	Steady
2	Milan Malpensa	Milan	24,725,490	▲11.5%	Steady
3	Orio al Serio	Milan	12,938,572	▲4.9%	Steady
4	Venice Marco Polo	Venice	11,184,608	▲7.8%	Steady
5	Catania	Catania	9,933,318	▲8.9%	▲1
6	Naples	Naples	9,932,029	▲15.8%	▲1
7	Milan Linate	Milan	9,233,475	▼3.3%	▼2
8	Bologna	Bologna	8,506,658	▲3.8%	Steady
9	Palermo	Palermo	6,628,558	▲14.8%	▲1
10	Rome Ciampino	Rome	5,839,737	▼0.8%	▼1
11	Pisa	Pisa	5,463,090	▲4.4%	Steady
12	Bari	Bari	5,030,760	▲7.4%	Steady
13	Cagliari	Cagliari	4,370,014	▲5.1%	▲1
14	Turin	Turin	4,084,923	▼2.2%	▼1
15	Verona	Verona	3,459,807	▲11.6%	Steady
16	Treviso	Treviso	3,308,955	▲9.7%	Steady
17	Olbia	Olbia	2,999,253	▲6.7%	Steady
18	Lamezia Terme	Lamezia Terme	2,756,211	▲8.2%	▲1
19	Florence	Florence	2,719,081	▲2.3%	▼1
20	Brindisi	Brindisi	2,478,856	▲6.8%	Steady
21	Genoa	Genoa	1,455,627	▲16.5%	▲2
22	Alghero	Alghero	1,365,129	▲3.3%	▼1
23	Trieste	Trieste	772,517	▼1.1%	▲1
24	Pescara	Pescara	666,691	▼0.2%	▲1
25	Trapani	Trapani	480,524	▼62.8%	▼3
26	Ancona	Ancona	452,567	▼6.7%	Steady
27	Comiso	Ragusa	424,487	▼2.9%	Steady
28	Reggio Calabria	Reggio Calabria	358,321	▼6.1%	Steady
29	Rimini	Rimini	308,000	▲0.8%	Steady
30	Lampedusa	Lampedusa	269,873	▲4.3%	Steady
31	Perugia	Perugia	223,436	▼10.7%	Steady
32	Cuneo	Cuneo	114,271	▼6.1%	▲1
33	Crotone	Crotone	83,854	Steady	Steady
34	Parma	Parma	79,014	▼51.1%	▼2
35	Bolzano	Bolzano	18,492	▲14.3%	▼1
36	Grosseto	Grosseto	10,558	▼1.9%	Steady
37	Brescia	Brescia	8,589	▼37.9%	▼2
38	Foggia	Foggia	522	▼3.3%	▼1
39	Taranto	Taranto	365	▲122.6%	▼1
Total			185,681,351	▲5.9%	

== 2017 ==
Rank	Airport	Serves	Total passengers	Annual change	Rank change
1	Rome Leonardo da Vinci-Fiumicino	Rome	40,971,881	▼1.9%	Steady
2	Milan Malpensa	Milan	22,169,167	▲14.2%	Steady
3	Orio al Serio	Bergamo	12,336,137	▲10.5%	Steady
4	Venice Marco Polo	Venice	10,371,380	▲7.8%	▲1
5	Milan Linate	Milan	9,548,363	▼1.4%	▼1
6	Catania	Catania	9,120,913	▲15.2%	Steady
7	Naples	Naples	8,577,507	▲26.6%	▲1
8	Bologna	Bologna	8,198,156	▲6.7%	▼1
9	Rome Ciampino	Rome	5,885,812	▲9.1%	Steady
10	Palermo	Palermo	5,775,274	▲8.4%	Steady
11	Pisa	Pisa	5,233,118	▲4.9%	Steady
12	Bari	Bari	4,686,016	▲8.4%	Steady
13	Turin	Turin	4,176,556	▲5.7%	Steady
14	Cagliari	Cagliari	4,157,612	▲12.5%	Steady
15	Verona	Verona	3,099,142	▲10.4%	Steady
16	Treviso	Treviso	3,015,057	▲14.4%	Steady
17	Olbia	Olbia	2,811,378	▲10.4%	Steady
18	Florence	Florence	2,658,049	▲5.7%	▲1
19	Lamezia Terme	Lamezia Terme	2,545,203	▲0.9%	▼1
20	Brindisi	Brindisi	2,321,147	▼0.4%	Steady
21	Alghero	Alghero	1,321,676	▼1.8%	▲1
22	Trapani	Trapani	1,292,957	▼13.4%	▼1
23	Genoa	Genoa	1,249,374	▼6.9%	Steady
24	Trieste	Trieste	780,776	▲7.3%	Steady
25	Pescara	Pescara	667,831	▲16.7%	Steady
26	Ancona	Ancona	485,037	▲0.5%	▲1
27	Comiso	Ragusa	437,180	▼4.9%	▲1
28	Reggio Calabria	Reggio Calabria	381,442	▼21.4%	▼2
29	Rimini	Rimini	305,576	▲26.6%	Steady
30	Lampedusa	Lampedusa	258,808	▲13.7%	▼1
31	Perugia	Perugia	250,133	▲12.7%	▼1
32	Parma	Parma	161,620	▼15.9%	▼1
33	Cuneo	Cuneo	121,663	▼10.9%	▼1
34	Bolzano	Bolzano	16,174	▲4.3%	Steady
35	Brescia	Brescia	13,821	▼28.2%	▼2
36	Grosseto	Grosseto	10,762	▲242.3%	▼1
37	Foggia	Foggia	540	▲48.4%	▼1
38	Taranto	Taranto	164	▼51.9%	Steady
Total			175,413,402	▲6.4%	

== 2016 ==
Rank	Airport	Serves	Total passengers	Annual change	Rank change
1	Rome Leonardo da Vinci-Fiumicino	Rome	41,744,769	▲3.2%	Steady
2	Milan Malpensa	Milan	19,420,690	▲4.5%	Steady
3	Orio al Serio	Bergamo	11,159,631	▲7.3%	Steady
4	Milan Linate	Milan	9,682,264	▼0.1%	Steady
5	Venice Marco Polo	Venice	9,624,748	▲10%	Steady
6	Catania	Catania	7,914,117	▲11.4%	Steady
7	Bologna	Bologna	7,680,992	▲11.5%	Steady
8	Naples	Naples	6,775,988	▲9.9%	Steady
9	Rome Ciampino	Rome	5,395,699	▼7.5%	Steady
10	Palermo	Palermo	5,325,559	▲8.4%	Steady
11	Pisa	Pisa	4,989,496	▲3.8%	Steady
12	Bari	Bari	4,322,797	▲8.8%	Steady
13	Turin	Turin	3,950,908	▲7.8%	▲1
14	Cagliari	Cagliari	3,695,045	▼0.7%	▼1
15	Verona	Verona	2,807,811	▲8.4%	Steady
16	Treviso	Treviso	2,634,397	▲10.5%	▲1
17	Olbia	Olbia	2,546,073	▲13.7%	▲3
18	Lamezia Terme	Lamezia Terme	2,521,781	▲7.7%	Steady
19	Florence	Florence	2,515,138	▲3.9%	▼3
20	Brindisi	Brindisi	2,329,509	▲3.2%	▼1
21	Trapani	Trapani	1,493,519	▼5.9%	▲1
22	Alghero	Alghero	1,346,403	▼19.8%	▼1
23	Genoa	Genoa	1,269,756	▼6.9%	Steady
24	Trieste	Trieste	727,409	▼1.9%	Steady
25	Pescara	Pescara	572,217	▼6.6%	Steady
26	Reggio Calabria	Reggio Calabria	485,346	▼1.5%	▲1
27	Ancona	Ancona	482,580	▼7.4%	▼1
28	Comiso	Ragusa	459,865	▲23.3%	Steady
29	Lampedusa	Lampedusa	227,576	▲23.2%	Steady
30	Perugia	Perugia	221,941	▼19%	▼1
31	Parma	Parma	192,170	▲2.7%	▼1
32	Cuneo	Cuneo	136,609	▲5.2%	▼1
33	Brescia	Brescia	19,239	▲148.4%	Steady
34	Bolzano	Bolzano	15,509	▼55.9%	▼2
35	Grosseto	Grosseto	3,144	▼1.2%	▼1
36	Foggia	Foggia	364	▼81.3%	▼1
Total			164,691,059	▲4.6%	

== 2015 ==
Rank	Airport	Serves	Total passengers	Annual change	Rank change
1	Rome Leonardo da Vinci-Fiumicino	Rome	40,463,208	▲4.8%	Steady
2	Milan Malpensa	Milan	18,582,043	▼1.4%	Steady
3	Orio al Serio	Bergamo	10,404,625	▲18.6%	▲1
4	Milan Linate	Milan	9,689,635	▲7.4%	▼1
5	Venice Marco Polo	Venice	8,751,028	▲3.3%	Steady
6	Catania	Catania	7,105,487	▼2.7%	Steady
7	Bologna	Bologna	6,889,742	▲4.7%	Steady
8	Naples	Naples	6,163,188	▲3.4%	Steady
9	Rome Ciampino	Rome	5,834,201	▲16.1%	Steady
10	Palermo	Palermo	4,910,791	▲7.4%	▲1
11	Pisa	Pisa	4,804,812	▲2.6%	▼1
12	Bari	Bari	3,972,105	▲8%	Steady
13	Cagliari	Cagliari	3,719,289	▲2.2%	Steady
14	Turin	Turin	3,666,424	▲6,8%	Steady
15	Verona	Verona	2,591,255	▼6.6%	Steady
16	Florence	Florence	2,419,818	▲7.5%	▲1
17	Treviso	Treviso	2,383,307	▲6%	▲1
18	Lamezia Terme	Lamezia Terme	2,342,452	▼2.8%	▼2
19	Brindisi	Brindisi	2,258,292	▲4.4%	Steady
20	Olbia	Olbia	2,240,016	▲5.3%	Steady
21	Alghero	Alghero	1,677,967	▲2.4%	Steady
22	Trapani	Trapani	1,586,992	▼0,7%	Steady
23	Genoa	Genoa	1,363,240	▲7,5%	Steady
24	Trieste	Trieste	741,776	▲0.2%	Steady
25	Pescara	Pescara	612,875	▲10.1%	Steady
26	Ancona	Ancona	521,065	▲8.4%	▲1
27	Reggio Calabria	Reggio Calabria	492,612	▼5,8%	▼1
28	Comiso	Ragusa	372,963	▲13.6%	▲1
29	Perugia	Perugia	274,027	▲30.9%	▲1
30	Parma	Parma	187,028	▼9%	▲1
31	Cuneo	Cuneo	129,847	▼45.3%	▼2
32	Bolzano	Bolzano	35,141	▼46.4%	Steady
33	Brescia	Brescia	7,744	▼42.8%	Steady
34	Grosseto	Grosseto	3,183	▼32%	▲1
35	Foggia	Foggia	1,942	▼67%	▼1
Total			157,200,120	▲4.5%	

== 2014 ==
Rank	Airport	Serves	Total passengers	Annual change	Rank change
1	Rome Leonardo da Vinci-Fiumicino	Rome	38,506,908	▲6.5%	Steady
2	Milan Malpensa	Milan	18,851,238	▲5%	Steady
3	Milan Linate	Milan	9,031,855	▼0.0%	Steady
4	Orio al Serio	Bergamo	8,774,256	▼2.1%	Steady
5	Venice Marco Polo	Venice	8,475,188	▲0.9%	Steady
6	Catania	Catania	7,304,012	▲14.1%	Steady
7	Bologna	Bologna	6,580,481	▲6.2%	Steady
8	Naples	Naples	5,960,035	▲9.5%	Steady
9	Rome Ciampino	Rome	5,018,289	▲5.7%	Steady
10	Pisa	Pisa	4,683,811	▲4.6%	Steady
11	Palermo	Palermo	4,569,550	▲5.1%	Steady
12	Bari	Bari	3,677,160	▲2.2%	Steady
13	Cagliari	Cagliari	3,639,627	▲1.4%	Steady
14	Turin	Turin	3,431,986	▲8.6%	Steady
15	Verona	Verona	2,775,627	▲2.1%	Steady
16	Lamezia Terme	Lamezia Terme	2,411,486	▲10.4%	Steady
17	Florence	Florence	2,251,994	▲13.6%	▲3
18	Treviso	Treviso	2,248,254	▲3.4%	▼1
19	Brindisi	Brindisi	2,163,742	▲8.6%	Steady
20	Olbia	Olbia	2,127,718	▲7.9%	▼2
21	Alghero	Alghero	1,639,374	▲4.8%	▲1
22	Trapani	Trapani	1,598,571	▼14.9%	▼1
23	Genoa	Genoa	1,268,650	▼2.7%	Steady
24	Trieste	Trieste	740,403	▼13.3%	Steady
25	Pescara	Pescara	556,679	▲1.5%	▲2
26	Reggio Calabria	Reggio Calabria	522,849	▼7.1%	Steady
27	Ancona	Ancona	480,673	▼4.5%	▲1
28	Rimini	Rimini	473,103	▼15.9%	▼3
29	Cuneo	Cuneo	237,432	▼18.3%	Steady
30	Perugia	Perugia	209,364	▼2.9%	Steady
31	Parma	Parma	205,521	▲4.4%	Steady
32	Bolzano	Bolzano	65,543	▲96.4%	▲2
33	Brescia	Brescia	13,527	▲31.2%	▲3
34	Foggia	Foggia	5,884	▼3.3%	▲3
35	Grosseto	Grosseto	4,681	▼11.9%	▲3
Total			150,254,202		

== 2013 ==
Rank	Airport	Serves	Total passengers	Annual change	Rank change
1	Rome Leonardo da Vinci-Fiumicino	Rome	36,166,345	▼2.2%	Steady
2	Milan Malpensa	Milan	17,955,075	▼3.1%	Steady
3	Milan Linate	Milan	9,034,373	▼2.1%	Steady
4	Orio al Serio	Bergamo	8,964,376	▲0.8%	Steady
5	Venice Marco Polo	Venice	8,403,790	▲2.6%	Steady
6	Catania	Catania	6,400,127	▲2.5%	Steady
7	Bologna	Bologna	6,193,783	▲4%	Steady
8	Naples	Naples	5,444,422	▼6.2%	Steady
9	Rome Ciampino	Rome	4,749,251	▲5.6%	▲1
10	Pisa	Pisa	4,479,690	▼0.3%	▲1
11	Palermo	Palermo	4,349,672	▼5.6%	▼2
12	Bari	Bari	3,599,910	▼4.8%	Steady
13	Cagliari	Cagliari	3,587,907	▼0.1%	Steady
14	Turin	Turin	3,160,287	▼10.3%	Steady
15	Verona	Verona	2,719,815	▼15%	Steady
16	Lamezia Terme	Lamezia Terme	2,184,102	▼1.1%	▲1
17	Treviso	Treviso	2,175,396	▼6.8%	▼1
18	Olbia	Olbia	1,999,618	▲5.9%	▲1
19	Brindisi	Brindisi	1,992,722	▼5.2%	▼1
20	Florence	Florence	1,983,268	▲7.1%	Steady
21	Trapani	Trapani	1,878,557	▲19%	Steady
22	Alghero	Alghero	1,563,908	▲3%	Steady
23	Genoa	Genoa	1,303,571	▼5.7%	Steady
24	Trieste	Trieste	853,599	▼3.2%	Steady
25	Rimini	Rimini	562,830	▼29.3%	Steady
26	Reggio Calabria	Reggio Calabria	562,747	▼1.6%	Steady
27	Pescara	Pescara	548,257	▼2.7%	▲1
28	Ancona	Ancona	503,392	▼10.8%	▼1
29	Cuneo	Cuneo	290,623	▲23.1%	▲1
30	Perugia	Perugia	215,550	▲6.8%	▲1
31	Parma	Parma	196,820	▲10.7%	▲1
32	Comiso	Ragusa	56,854	Steady	Opened in May13
33	Forlì	Forlì	39,885	▼84.8%	▼4
34	Bolzano	Bolzano	33,377	▼26.4%	Steady
35	Crotone	Crotone	25,180	▼84%	▼2
36	Brescia	Brescia	10,311	▼54.5%	▼1
37	Foggia	Foggia	6,085	▼19.3%	▼1
38	Grosseto	Grosseto	5,310	▲21.2%	▼1
39	Siena	Siena	258	▼93%	▼1

== 2012 ==
Rank	Airport	Serves	Total passengers	Annual change	Rank change
1	Rome Leonardo da Vinci-Fiumicino	Rome	36,980,911	▼1.8%	Steady
2	Milan Malpensa	Milan	18,537,301	▼4%	Steady
3	Milan Linate	Milan	9,229,890	▲1.1%	Steady
4	Orio al Serio	Bergamo	8,890,720	▲5.6%	Steady
5	Venice Marco Polo	Venice	8,188,455	▼4.6%	Steady
6	Catania	Catania	6,246,888	▼8.1%	Steady
7	Bologna	Bologna	5,958,648	▲1.2%	Steady
8	Naples	Naples	5,801,836	▲0.6%	Steady
9	Palermo	Palermo	4,608,533	▼7.7%	Steady
10	Rome Ciampino	Rome	4,497,376	▼6%	Steady
11	Pisa	Pisa	4,494,915	▼0.7%	Steady
12	Bari	Bari	3,780,112	▲1.5%	Steady
13	Cagliari	Cagliari	3,592,020	▼2.9%	Steady
14	Turin	Turin	3,521,847	▼5.1%	Steady
15	Verona	Verona	3,198,788	▼5.5%	Steady
16	Treviso	Treviso	2,333,758	▲116.6%	Steady
17	Lamezia Terme	Lamezia Terme	2,208,382	▼4%	Steady
18	Brindisi	Brindisi	2,101,045	▲2.1%	Steady
19	Olbia	Olbia	1,887,640	▲0.7%	Steady
20	Florence	Florence	1,852,619	▼2.8%	Steady
21	Trapani	Trapani	1,578,753	▲7.4%	Steady
22	Alghero	Alghero	1,518,870	▲0.3%	Steady
23	Genoa	Genoa	1,381,693	▼1.8%	Steady
24	Trieste	Trieste	882,146	▲2.6%	Steady
25	Rimini	Rimini	795,872	▼13.6%	Steady
26	Reggio Calabria	Reggio Calabria	571,694	▲1.9%	Steady
27	Ancona	Ancona	564,576	▼7.5%	Steady
28	Pescara	Pescara	563,187	▲2.4%	Steady
29	Forlì	Forlì	261,939	▼24.4%	Steady
30	Cuneo	Cuneo	236,113	▲4.8%	Steady
31	Perugia	Perugia	201,926	▲15%	Steady
32	Parma	Parma	177,807	▼34.4%	Steady
33	Crotone	Crotone	154,250	▲25.5%	Steady
34	Bolzano	Bolzano	45,328	▼33.9%	Steady
35	Brescia	Brescia	22,669	▼32.9%	Steady
36	Foggia	Foggia	7,544	▼87.9%	Steady
37	Grosseto	Grosseto	4,382	▼13.1%	Steady
38	Siena	Siena	3,745	▼23%	Steady

== 2011 ==
Rank	Airport	Serves	Total passengers	Annual change	Rank change
1	Leonardo da Vinci-Fiumicino Airport	Rome	37,651,700	▲3.6%	Steady
2	Malpensa Airport	Milan	19,303,131	▲1.8%	Steady
3	Linate Airport	Milan	9,128,522	▲9.2%	Steady
4	Venice Marco Polo Airport	Venice	8,584,651	▲25.0%	Steady
5	Orio al Serio	Bergamo	8,419,948	▲9.7%	Steady
6	Catania-Fontanarossa Airport	Catania	6,794,063	▲7.5%	Steady
7	Guglielmo Marconi Airport	Bologna	5,885,884	▲6.8%	Steady
8	Capodichino Airport	Naples	5,768,873	▲3.3%	Steady
9	Punta Raisi Airport	Palermo	4,992,798	▲14.3%	Steady
10	Ciampino Airport	Rome	4,781,731	▲4.8%	Steady
11	Galileo Galilei Airport	Pisa	4,526,723	▲11.3%	Steady
12	Palese Macchie Airport	Bari	3,725,629	▲9.6%	Steady
13	Caselle Airport	Turin	3,710,485	▲4.2%	Steady
14	Cagliari-Elmas Airport	Cagliari	3,698,982	▲7.4%	Steady
15	Villafranca Airport	Verona	3,385,794	▲12.0%	Steady
16	Lamezia Terme Airport	Lamezia Terme	2,301,408	▲20.1%	Steady
17	Brindisi Airport	Brindisi	2,058,057	▲28.1%	Steady
18	Peretola Airport	Florence	1,906,102	▲9.7%	Steady
19	Costa Smeralda Airport	Olbia	1,874,696	▲13.9%	Steady
20	Alghero Airport	Alghero	1,514,254	▲21.1%	Steady
21	Trapani-Birgi Airport	Trapani	1,470,508	▼12.6%	Steady
22	Genoa Airport	Genoa	1,406,986	▲9.3%	Steady
23	Treviso Airport	Treviso	1,077,505	▼49.9%	Steady
24	Rimini Airport	Rimini	920,641	▲66.5%	Steady
25	Trieste Airport	Trieste	859,547	▲18.2%	Steady
26	Ancona Airport	Ancona	610,525	▲17.3%	Steady
27	Reggio Calabria Airport	Reggio Calabria	561,107	▲2.3%	Steady
28	Pescara Airport	Pescara	550,062	▲19.3%	Steady
29	Forlì Airport	Forlì	346,325	▼46.0%	Steady
30	Parma Airport	Parma	271,209	▲12.6%	Steady

== 2010 ==
Rank	Airport	Serves	Total passengers	Annual change	Rank change
1	Leonardo da Vinci-Fiumicino Airport	Rome	36,337,050	▲7.9%	Steady
2	Malpensa Airport	Milan	18,988,149	▲8.0%	Steady
3	Linate Airport	Milan	8,296,450	▲0.0%	Steady
4	Orio al Serio	Bergamo	7,677,224	▲7.3%	Steady
5	Venice Marco Polo Airport	Venice	6,854,595	▲2.3%	Steady
6	Catania-Fontanarossa Airport	Catania	6,318,177	▲6.5%	Steady
7	Capodichino Airport	Naples	5,571,738	▲4.9%	Steady
8	Guglielmo Marconi Airport	Bologna	5,503,106	▲15.3%	▲1
9	Ciampino Airport	Rome	4,531,834	▼4.7%	▼1
10	Punta Raisi Airport	Palermo	4,363,546	▼0.2%	Steady
11	Galileo Galilei Airport	Pisa	4,058,957	▲1.2%	Steady
12	Caselle Airport	Turin	3,552,519	▲10.3%	▲1
13	Cagliari-Elmas Airport	Cagliari	3,438,298	▲3.3%	▼1
14	Palese Macchie Airport	Bari	3,398,110	▲20.4%	▲1
15	Villafranca Airport	Verona	3,023,897	▼1.4%	▼1
16	Treviso Airport	Treviso	2,152,163	▲21.1%	Steady
17	Lamezia Terme Airport	Lamezia Terme	1,916,187	▲16.4%	▲1
18	Peretola Airport	Florence	1,737,904	▲2.9%	▼1
19	Trapani-Birgi Airport	Trapani	1,682,991	▲57.3%	▲1
20	Costa Smeralda Airport	Olbia	1,658,836	▼2.1%	▼1
