= ENAV =

Italian air traffic management company

ENAV S.p.A.

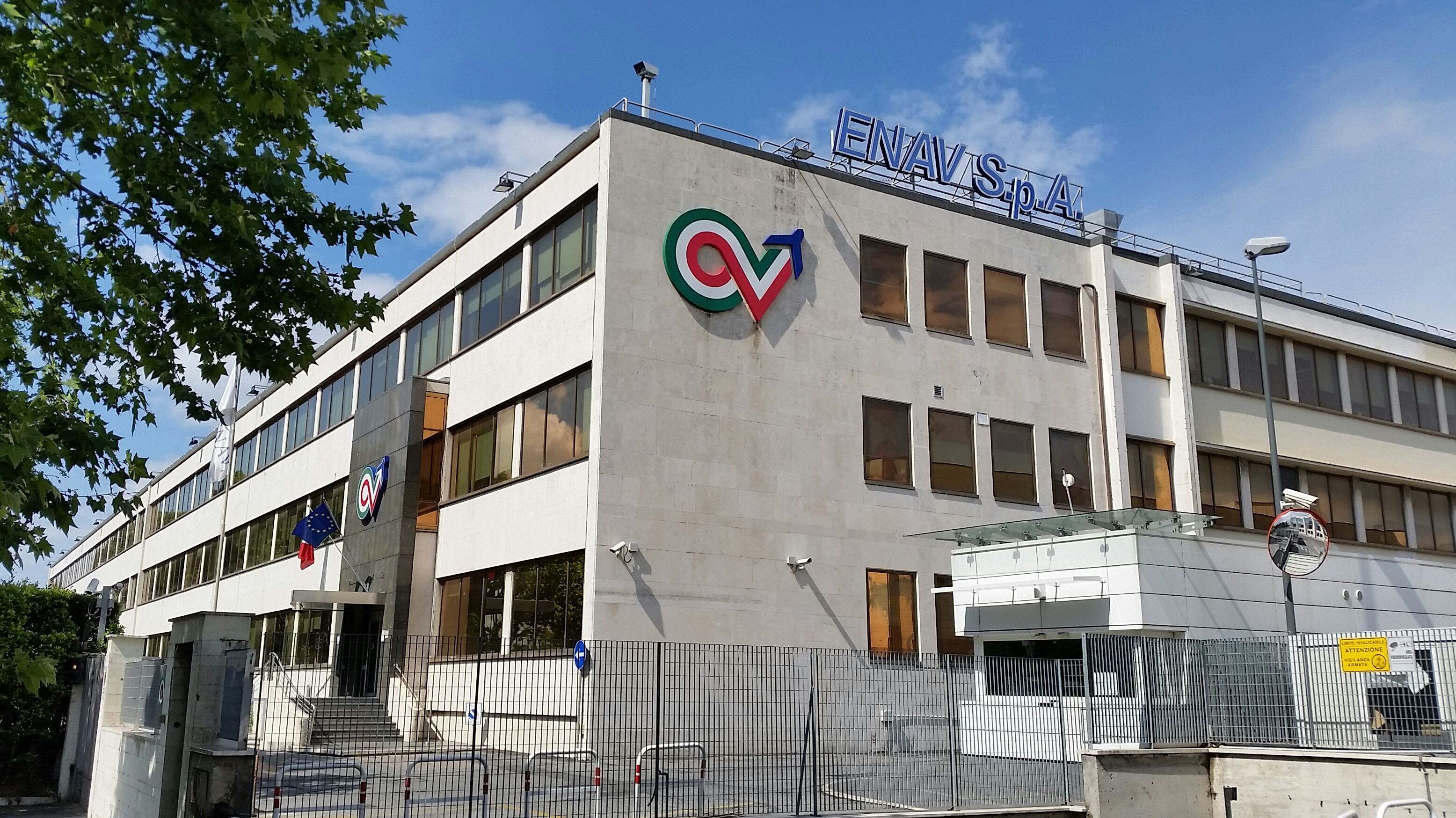
- Headquarters in Rome, Via Salaria, 716.
- Type: Public Joint-Stock company
- Traded as: FTSE Italia Mid Cap
- Industry: Air traffic management
- Headquarters: Rome, Italy
- Area served: Italy
- Key people: Alessandra Bruni (Chairman); Igor De Biasio (CEO)
- Services: Air traffic control
- Revenue: € 1.02 billion € (2025)
- Net income: € 93,1 million (2025)
- Owner: Ministry of Economy and Finance
- Number of employees: 4,477 (2025)
- Website: Home page ENAV

ENAV S.p.A. is an Italian government-controlled joint-stock company which operates as an exclusive supplier of civil air navigation services in the Italian airspace. As an air navigation service provider (ANSP) it is responsible for the provision of air traffic control service (ATCS), flight information service (FIS), aeronautical information service (AIS), and issuing of weather forecasts for the airports and the airspace under its responsibility.

The company name ENAV was the former name of the public agency, acronym for "Ente Nazionale Assistenza al Volo". In 2001 the agency ENAV was transformed in ENAV S.p.A., a company owned by the Italian Treasury.

The company is controlled by the Ministry of Economy and Finance (53.28% of the share capital and is subject to the supervision of the National Civil Aviation Authority (ENAC) and the Ministry of Infrastructure and Transport.

It has been listed on the FTSE Italia Mid Cap Index of the Borsa Italiana since July 2016.

== History ==
The current company draws its origins from the Autonomous General Air Traffic Flight Assistance Company (AAAVTAG), established in 1981, following the demilitarization of air traffic control, which followed a sensational strike by air traffic controllers, currently all in force to the Air Force, which took place on October 19, 1979.

The AAAVTAG was a non-economic public body which in December 1996 was transformed into an economic public body, with the name of Ente Nazionale Assistenza alla Volo (ENAV).

To support the liberalization of air transport, the National Civil Aviation Authority (ENAC) was established in 1997, with the functions of Italian authority for technical regulation, certification and supervision in the civil aviation sector.

On 1 January 2001, ENAV was transformed into a joint stock company fully owned by the public (ENAV S.p.A.). The company is owned by the Ministry of Economy and Finance and is subject to the supervision of ENAC and the Ministry of Infrastructure and Transport. The Court of Audit is responsible for checking the legitimacy of the company's financial management.

In April 2016, ENAV presented the application and documentation for listing to the Italian stock exchange and CONSOB. As of December 2022, the Ministry of Economy and Finance holds 53.28% of the share capital.

In December 2025, it was announced that ENAV had agreed to acquire an 85% stake in AIviewgroup, a firm specialising in drone services and unmanned systems. The transaction, which valued AIviewgroup at approximately €10.5 million on an enterprise value basis, was scheduled to complete in the first quarter of 2026, subject to customary closing conditions.

== Shareholdings ==
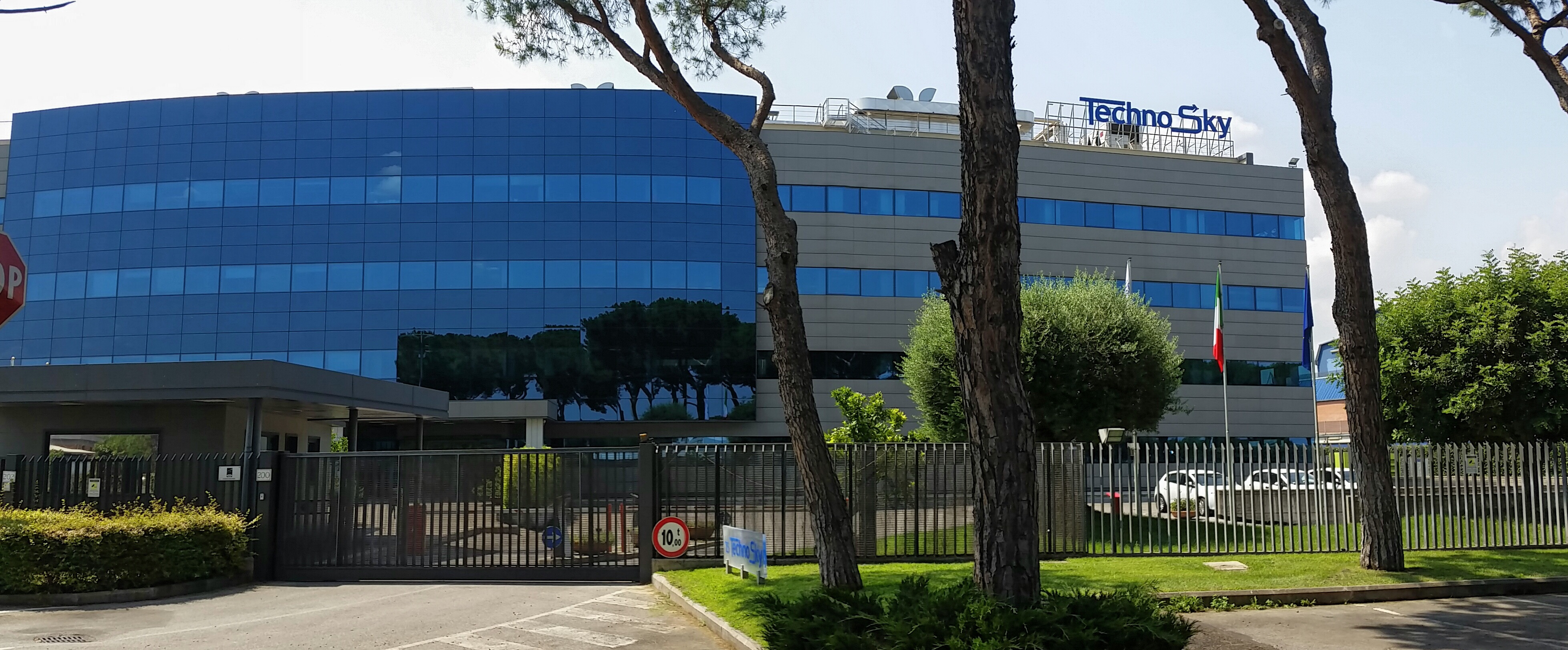
Techno Sky headquarters in Rome

=== Techno Sky ===
In 2006 ENAV acquired from Vitrociset Techno Sky, the society for development and maintenance of the air traffic management technologies used by ENAV. Techno Sky projects installs and manage the air traffic control technologies for ENAV and others institutions in Italy and abroad.

Techno Sky operates in four area control centres (ACC) in Rome, Milan, Padua and Brindisi and in 4 airports, managing 44 radar systems, 121 telecommunications centres, 68 meteorological systems and 239 navigation aid systems (ILS, VOR, DME).

=== Other Shareholders ===
The Group also includes IDS AirNav which deals with software and platforms for air traffic management, D-Flight, a company which deals with the creation of a platform for the management of drones and for the provision of UAV services.

Another ENAV Group company is ENAV Asia Pacific, a company incorporated under Malaysian law based in Kuala Lumpur, which manages ENAV's commercial activities in South-East Asia.

Finally, ENAV North Atlantic, a company incorporated under American law, which participates in the Aireon satellite project.

== Area control centres ==
FIRs and ACCs in Italy

ENAV operates four Area Control Centres (ACCs) in Rome, Milan, Padua and Brindisi managing the IFR air traffic in the Italian flight information region (FIR).

== Control towers ==
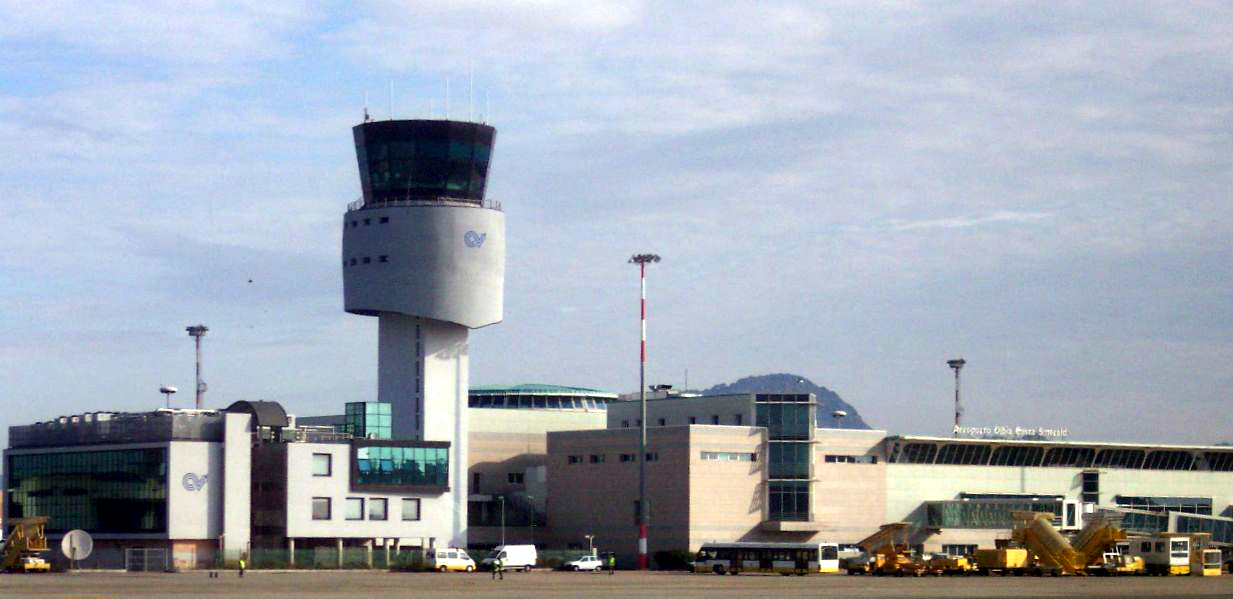
Control tower at Olbia Airport

ENAV operates control towers of 44 airports in Italy, managing departures, landings, and ground movements.

- Albenga Airport
- Alghero – Fertilia Airport
- Ancona – Falconara Airport
- Bari – Palese Airport
- Bergamo – Orio al Serio Airport
- Brescia – Montichiari Airport
- Bologna – Borgo Panigale Airport
- Bolzano Airport
- Brindisi – Salento Airport
- Cagliari – Elmas Airport
- Catania – Fontanarossa Airport
- Comiso Airport
- Crotone Airport
- Cuneo – Levaldigi International Airport
- Florence – Peretola Airport
- Foggia – Gino Lisa Airport
- Forlì - Luigi Ridolfi Airport
- Genoa – Sestri Ponente Airport
- Lamezia Terme International Airport
- Lampedusa Airport
- Milan – Linate Airport
- Milan – Malpensa Airport
- Naples – Capodichino International Airport
- Olbia – Costa Smeralda Airport
- Padua Airport
- Palermo – Punta Raisi Airport
- Pantelleria Airport
- Parma Airport
- Perugia International Airport
- Pescara – Abruzzo Airport
- Reggio Calabria Airport
- Rimini - Federico Fellini International Airport
- Rome - Ciampino Airport
- Rome – Fiumicino Airport
- Rome – Urbe Airport
- Rieti Airport
- Salerno – Pontecagnano Airport
- Taranto – Grottaglie Airport
- Turin – Aeritalia Airport
- Turin – Caselle Airport
- Treviso - Sant'Angelo Airport
- Trieste – Ronchi del Legionari Airport
- Venice – Tessera Airport
- Venice – Lido Airport
- Verona - Catullo Airport

== International Cooperation ==
ENAV is part of the European Commission's initiative to develop the Single European Sky, i.e. the integrated air route management system.

The company is also a member of EUROCONTROL, the civil and military organization made up of 41 states whose mission is to develop and maintain an efficient air traffic control system together with the national civil aviation authorities (in Italy ENAC), the suppliers of air traffic control services (in Italy ENAV and the Italian Air Force), users of civil and military airspace, industry, professional organizations and European institutions.

== Top Management ==
Chronology of top management.

ENAV S.p.A.
Period	Position and Names	References
from 2020 (term 2020-2022)	Chairman: Francesca Isgrò; CEO: Paolo Simioni	
2017-2020 (term 2017-2019)	Chairman (dal 2018): Nicola Maione; Chairman (2017 - 2018): Roberto Scaramella; CEO: Roberta Neri	
2014 - 2017	Chairman (dal 2015): Ferdinando Franco Falco Beccalli; Chairman (2014 - 2015): Maria Teresa Di Matteo; CEO (dal 2015): Roberta Neri	
november 2011 - 2014	Sole Director: Massimo Garbini	
2011 (term 2011 - 2014)	Chairman: Luigi Martini; Vice Chairman: Massimo Varazzani; CEO: Guido Pugliesi	
2009 - 2011	Chairman: Luigi Martini; CEO: Guido Pugliesi	
2006 - 2008	Chairman: Bruno Nieddu; CEO: Guido Pugliesi	
2003 - 2005	Chairman: Bruno Nieddu; CEO: Guido Pugliesi	
2002 - 2003	Sole Director: Massimo Varazzani	
2001 - 2002 (term 2001 - 2004)	Chairman: Giulio Spano; CEO: Sandro Gualano	

ENAV – Ente Nazionale Assistenza Volo
Period	Position and Names	References
2000 - 2001	Commissioner: Sandro Gualano	
1997 - 2000	Chairman: Luciano Mancini	
1997	Special Manager: Massimo D'Antona	
1996	Chairman: Giovanni Tricomi	
1995	Special Manager: Giovanni Tricomi	
1995	Special Manager: Michele Sicoli	
1994 - 1995	Special Commissioner: Stelio Nardini	
1992 - 1994	Chairman: Piero Tana	
1986 - 1992	Chairman: Domenico Majone	
1982 - 1986	Chairman: Antonio Mura	
1981	Commissioner: Antonio Mura	
