= Aeroitalia =

Airline of Italy

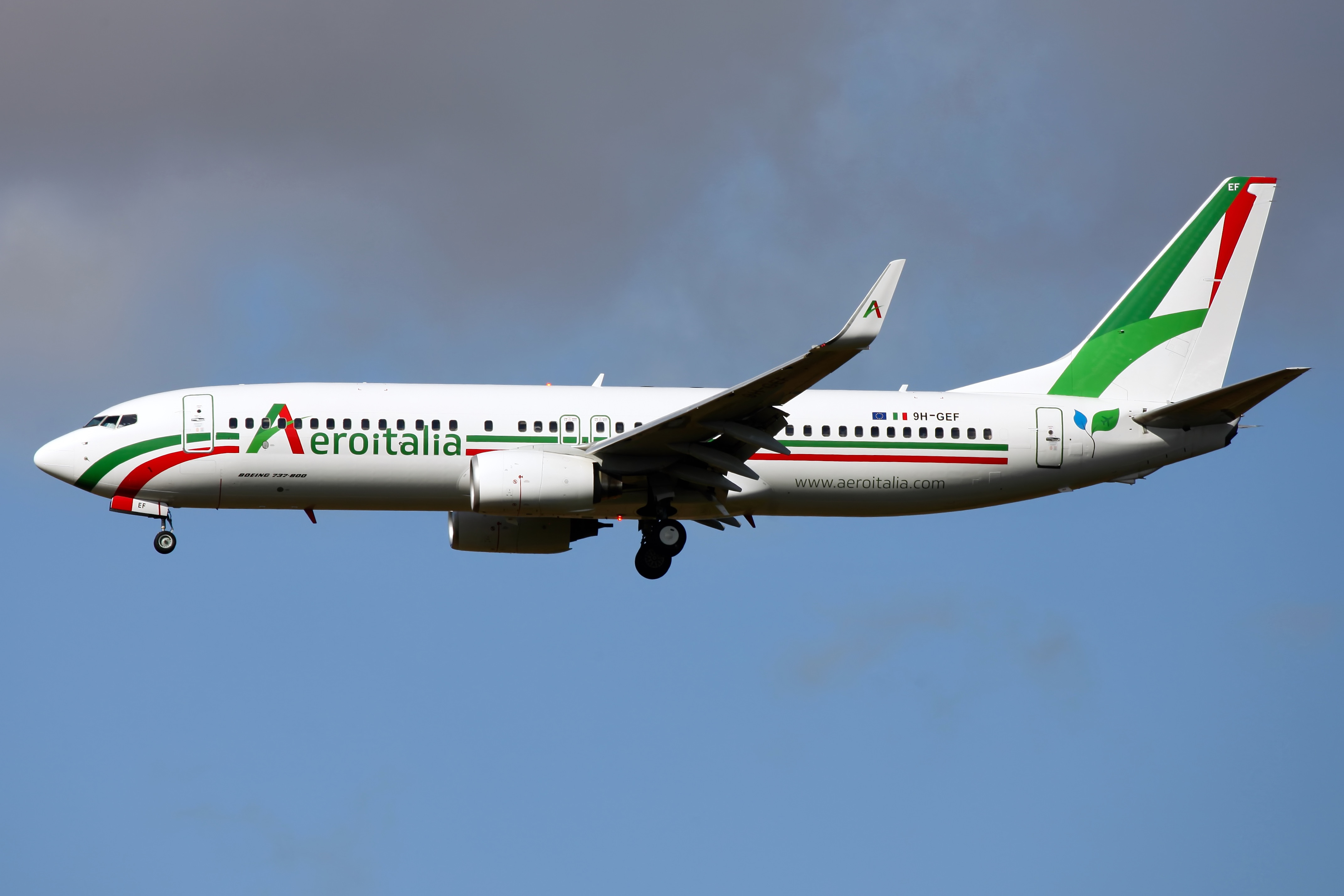
- Aeroitalia Boeing 737-800
IATA	ICAO	Call sign
XZ	AEZ	AEROITALIA
- Founded: 2021; 5 years ago
- Commenced operations: 9 July 2022; 4 years ago
- Operating bases: Bergamo; Comiso; Genoa; Rome–Fiumicino; Salerno
- Fleet size: 18
- Destinations: 26
- Headquarters: Rome, Italy
- Key people: Francesco Gaetano Intrieri (CEO)
- Website: www.aeroitalia.com

Aeroitalia S.r.l is an Italian airline. It operates a fleet of Boeing 737s and ATR 72s from operating bases in Bergamo, Comiso, Genoa, Rome–Fiumicino and Salerno.

== History ==
The airline was launched in 2022, by an ex-consultant of Italy's Ministry of Infrastructure and Transport, Francesco Gaetano Intrieri, who is Aeroitalia's CEO and by the initiative of its investor Marc Bourgade, executive chairman.

On 9 July 2022, it started operating scheduled flights from Forlì to domestic destinations as well as Malta and Zakynthos. The airline planned to operate long-haul flights to the United States and Latin America by 2023, but has since stalled the plan in order to consolidate its domestic and European operations.

It announced an increase of flights to Sicily in 2023 including additional flights to Trapani, Palermo, and Catania with the support of the Sicilian government.

On 6 November 2023, it was announced the airline had acquired a 93.86% stake in AirConnect, a Romanian regional airline, which was rebranded as Aeroitalia Regional in April 2024. In July 2024 the airline announced the opening of a new base in Bacau, Romania. In December 2024, Aeroitalia Regional was sold again, this time to Sicilian investors.

In December 2024, Intrieri announced that Aeroitalia would look to go public in 2025. This comes amid an ongoing ownership dispute in the United Kingdom's High Court involving Aeroitalia's chairman, Bourgade, who is alleged to have subverted an agreed-on sale of the airline with its launch investor.

=== Trademark lawsuit ===
In June 2025, an Italian court found via a lawsuit filed by ITA Airways that the Aeroitalia name and branding was too similar to that of Alitalia, and ordered the airline to change the name and branding and to cease use of the website aeroitalia.com by 1 January 2026. In August 2025, CEO Francesco Gaetano announced the airline would adopt a new name, branding, and aircraft livery, while keeping Aeroitalia as the corporate name prior to a court appeal in October. In September, the airline's new name was revealed to be "Air Italy" with the implementation date set for March 2026. In February 2026, the company announced it had reached an agreement with ITA to continue use of the Aeroitalia name and branding, and the lawsuit was dropped.

== Destinations ==
As of June 2026, Aeroitalia flies to the following destinations:

Country	City	Airport	Notes	Refs
Austria	Vienna	Vienna International Airport	Terminated	
Czech Republic	Brno	Brno-Tuřany Airport	Terminated	
Greece	Heraklion	Heraklion International Airport	Terminated	
Greece	Karpathos	Karpathos Island National Airport	Terminated	
Greece	Mykonos	Mykonos Airport	Seasonal	
Greece	Santorini	Santorini International Airport	Seasonal	
Greece	Zakynthos	Zakynthos International Airport	Terminated	
Italy	Alghero	Alghero–Fertilia Airport		
Italy	Ancona	Marche Airport	Terminated	
Italy	Bergamo	Milan Bergamo Airport	Base	
Italy	Bologna	Bologna Guglielmo Marconi Airport	Seasonal	
Italy	Brindisi	Brindisi Airport	Terminated	
Italy	Cagliari	Cagliari Elmas Airport		
Italy	Catania	Catania–Fontanarossa Airport		
Italy	Comiso	Comiso Airport	Base	
Italy	Cuneo	Cuneo International Airport		
Italy	Florence	Florence Airport	Seasonal	
Italy	Foggia	Foggia Gino Lisa Airport		
Italy	Forlì	Forlì Airport	Terminated	
Italy	Genoa	Genoa Cristoforo Colombo Airport	Base	
Italy	Lamezia Terme	Lamezia Terme International Airport	Seasonal	
Italy	Lampedusa	Lampedusa Airport	Terminated	
Italy	Milan	Milan Linate Airport		
Italy	Milan	Milan Malpensa Airport		
Italy	Naples	Naples International Airport	Terminated	
Italy	Olbia	Olbia Costa Smeralda Airport		
Italy	Palermo	Falcone Borsellino Airport		
Italy	Parma	Parma Airport	Seasonal	
Italy	Perugia	Perugia San Francesco d'Assisi – Umbria International Airport	Seasonal	
Italy	Pisa	Pisa International Airport	Seasonal	
Italy	Rome	Rome Fiumicino Airport	Base	
Italy	Salerno	Salerno Costa d'Amalfi Airport	Base	
Italy	Trapani	Trapani–Birgi Airport	Terminated	
Italy	Trieste	Trieste – Friuli Venezia Giulia Airport		
Italy	Turin	Turin Airport		
Italy	Verona	Verona Villafranca Airport	Terminated	
Libya	Tripoli	Mitiga International Airport		
Poland	Lublin	Lublin Airport	Terminated	
Romania	Bacău	George Enescu International Airport	Terminated	
Romania	Bucharest	Bucharest Henri Coandă International Airport	Terminated	
Spain	Barcelona	Josep Tarradellas Barcelona–El Prat Airport	Terminated	
Spain	Ibiza	Ibiza Airport	Seasonal	
Spain	Palma de Mallorca	Palma de Mallorca Airport	Seasonal	

=== Interline agreements ===
Aeroitalia has interline agreements with the following airlines:

- Air France
- Delta Air Lines
- Etihad Airways
- ITA Airways
- KLM
- Qatar Airways

== Fleet ==
=== Current fleet ===
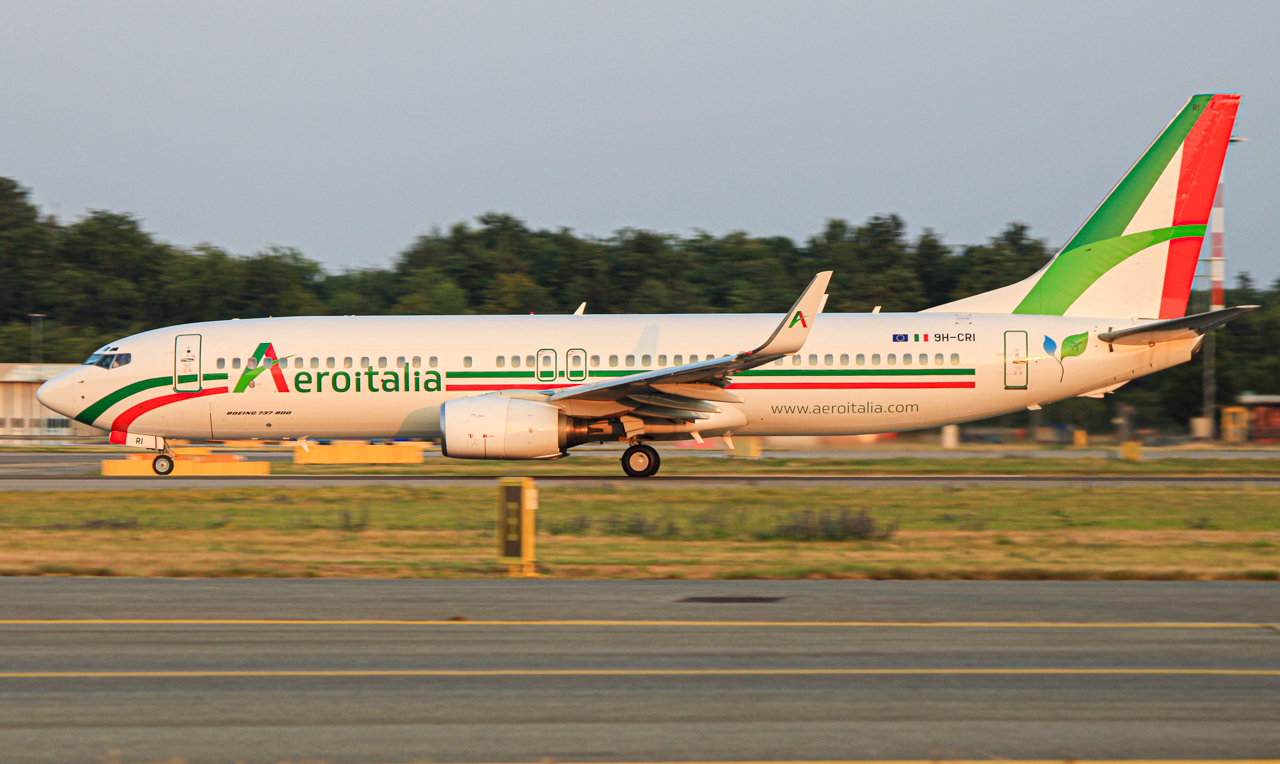
Aeroitalia Boeing 737-800

As of June 2026, Aeroitalia operates the following aircraft:

Aeroitalia fleet
Aircraft	In service	Orders	Passengers	Notes
ATR 72-600	2	—	68	
Boeing 737-700	2	—	148	One leased from HelloJets.
Boeing 737-800	12	—	189	One leased from HelloJets.
Boeing 737 MAX 8	—	5	TBA	Leased from Air Lease Corporation; to be delivered from March 2027.
Embraer 175	1	—	88	Leased from Marathon Airlines.
Embraer 195	1	—	118	Leased from Marathon Airlines.
Total	18	5		

=== Historical fleet ===
Over the years, Aeroitalia has operated the following aircraft types:

Aeroitalia historical fleet
Aircraft	Number	Introduced	Retired	Notes
Airbus A319	1	2024	2025	Leased from Fly Air41 Airways.
Boeing 737-400	2	2024	2025	Leased from 4Airways.
Boeing 737-700	1	2022	2024	Leased from HelloJets.
Embraer 190	1	2025	2025	Leased from Marathon Airlines.
Saab 340A	1	2023	2024	Leased from RAF-Avia.

== See also ==
- List of airlines of Italy
