= LICR =

LICR may refer to:

- Ludwig Institute for Cancer Research
- Reggio Calabria Airport
