= HelloJets =

Airline of Romania

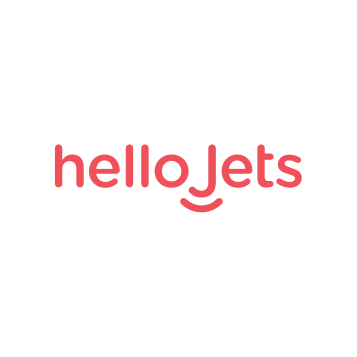
IATA	ICAO	Call sign
H3	HLJ	HELLOJETS
- Founded: 2021; 5 years ago
- Commenced operations: 2021; 5 years ago
- Hubs: Bucharest–Otopeni, Prague
- Fleet size: 10
- Destinations: Charter
- Key people: Tudor Constantinescu (CEO)
- Founder: Christian Rada
- Revenue: ▲€16.22 million (2023)
- Net income: ▼ −€2.82 million (2023)
- Website: www.hellojets.com

HelloJets is a Romanian airline based at Bucharest Henri Coandă International Airport.

== History ==
HelloJets was founded in 2021 by former Blue Air executive Christian Rada.

In June 2022, the airline launched its first charter service between Bucharest–Otopeni and Kos.

In November 2024, HelloJets opened a maintenance facility for Airbus A320 and Boeing 737 aircraft.

== Destinations ==
As of November 2025, HelloJets operates leisure charter services from Prague, Ostrava and Brno to destinations in Turkey, Egypt and Tunisia.

Since 2025, HelloJets has also operated flights from David Ben Gurion International Airport in Tel Aviv on behalf of Israir.

== Fleet ==
As of September 2025, HelloJets operates the following aircraft:

HelloJets fleet
Aircraft	In service	Orders	C	Y	Total
Airbus A320-200	4	—	—	180	180
Boeing 737-700	1	—	—	148	148
Boeing 737-800	5	—	—	189	189
Total	10				
