= Alghero–Fertilia Airport =

Alghero-Fertilia Airport Aeroporto di Alghero-Fertilia

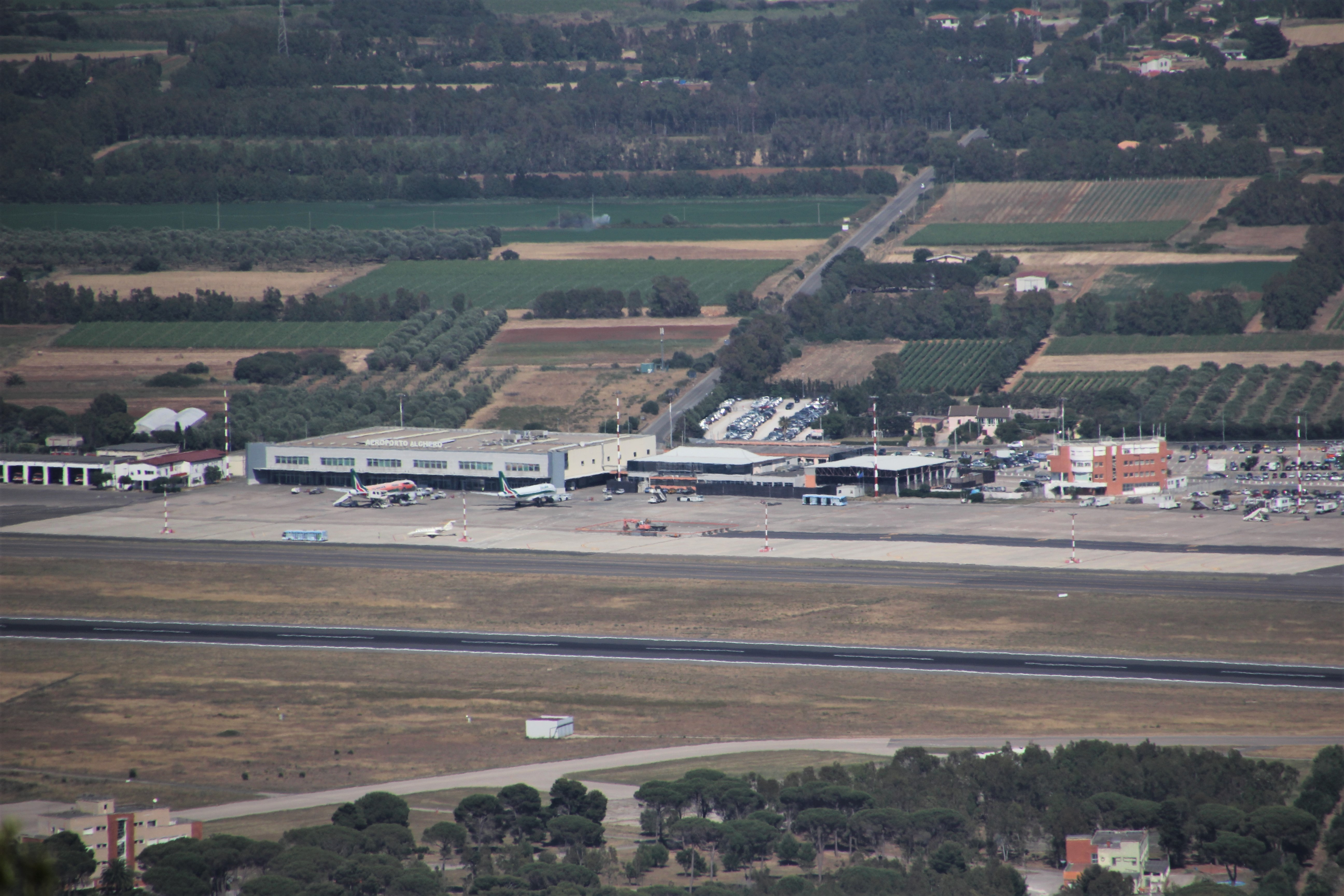
- IATA: AHO; ICAO: LIEA

Summary
- Airport type: Public
- Operator: Sogeaal S.p.a.
- Serves: Metropolitan City of Sassari Alghero
- Location: Fertilia, Italy
- Elevation AMSL: 87 ft (27 m)
- Coordinates: 40°37′52″N 08°17′19″E
- Website: aeroportodialghero.it

Map
- Location of the airport in Sardinia AHO (Italy)

Runways
Direction	Length		Surface
Direction	m	ft	Surface
02/20	3,000	9,843	Asphalt

Statistics (2025)
- Passengers: 1,770,493
- Passenger change 24 - 25: ▲9.9%
- Aircraft movements: 13,196
- ▲7,9%
- Sources:Assaeroporti

Alghero - Riviera del Corallo Airport (Italian: Aeroporto di Alghero - Riviera del Corallo; Catalan: L'Aeroport de l'Alguer-Fertília) (IATA: AHO, ICAO: LIEA) is an international airport situated 4.3 NM (8.0 km; 4.9 mi) north-northwest of the city of Alghero, in northern Sardinia, Italy. It is also known as Alghero–Fertilia Airport, named for the nearby village of Fertilia or Alghero Airport. It is one of the three main airports serving Sardinia, the other ones being Olbia in the northeast, and near Cagliari in the south. The airport is operated by SO.GE.A.AL (Societa di Gestione Aeroporto di Alghero).

== History ==
=== Early years ===
The airport opened in March 1938 as a military airport. During World War II, it was equipped with a 700-metre (2,300 ft) runway. Following the war, the runway was lengthened and improved.

During the early 1960s, the civil activities moved on the east side of the property and an old hangar was used as a passenger terminal. In 1971, the first passenger terminal was built. In the middle of the 1970s, the runway was lengthened to the current 3,000 m (9,800 ft), one of the longest runways in Italy and one of the safest.

In 1980, Alitalia established a flight school at Alghero Airport which trained up to 100 pilots a year, in conjunction with a diversification of activities including air taxi and maintenance services. The school closed in March 2003.

=== Development in the 2000s ===
At the end of February 2006, there was a disagreement between the municipalities of Sassari and Alghero concerning the name of the airport (by then called "Alghero-Riviera del Corallo" or "Alghero-Fertilia airport". It was suggested by Sassari administration (capital of province near Alghero) that the name should be changed to "Sassari-Alghero", which was the name used by Alitalia to advertise the first flights to the airport, but actually Alitalia used "Alghero-Sassari". The discussions came to nothing and the name recognized by Italian (ENAV) and the international aviation authorities, besides the majority of people remains "Alghero-Fertilia", although the intention of the airport management company is to change the name to "Alghero-Riviera del Corallo".

On 23 November 2007, management of the airport was transferred to SO.GE.A.AL. for a period of 40 years.

The terminal building was recently renovated and expanded with the construction of a new terminal, which allowed the airport to expand the services offered to travelers. A renovation of the old terminal is planned to transform it into a shopping mall. On 9 April 2008, the new departures and arrivals halls were inaugurated in the presence of civil authorities, the military and the Bishop of the Diocese of Alghero-Bosa Giacomo Lanzetti. This expanded the terminal area from 8,000 m^{2} (86,000 ft^{2}) to approximately 14,000 m^{2} (150,000 ft^{2}).

30 March 2009, Ryanair based two aircraft with their crews based at the airport. The airport's relationship with the Irish company has not always been smooth. For example, in August 2009, Ryanair announced it would discontinue the routes between Frankfurt Hahn and Madrid from October of the same year in addition to withdrawing various seasonal flights. The matter was eventually resolved and the routes were not cancelled. In January 2010, Ryanair asked for further subsidies from the local authorities. When this was refused, Ryanair announced it would cut seven routes to and from the airport. The local government signed agreements with Meridiana Fly and Alitalia to take over some routes, ending Ryanair's near monopoly on international flights from the airport. However, the new routes were quickly cancelled due to poor load-factors. Ryanair has resumed some of the cancelled routes (although flights to Hahn and Charleroi ended in October 2013) and remains the dominant carrier at the airport.

Since 27 October 2013, with the entry into force of the new Territorial Continuity Sardinien, the airline Livingston connected the Alghero airport with the Rome-Fiumicino Airport; this route was operated in the past by Alitalia. The company, following a conference held at Alghero airport in early November, announced that the Riviera del Corallo became its fifth base of operations, after Milan-Malpensa, Rome-Fiumicino, Rimini and Verona. But on 29 April 2014, the Autonomous Region of Sardinia decided to revoke the route Alghero - Rome - Fiumicino to New Livingston for "serious breaches", entrusting it again to Alitalia, runner in the contract notice for the Territorial Continuity of Sardinia. Therefore, as of 4 May 2014, with the flight Rome - Fiumicino - Alghero of 21:25, Alitalia resumed the route in territorial continuity. On 29 April 2014, Livingston, submitting an appeal to the TAR of Lazio, obtained a suspension of the provision of the Autonomous Region of Sardinia. On 15 May 2014, the TAR of Lazio declined jurisdiction in the matter and sent the case to the Administrative Court of Sardinia that on 29 May the same year, confirming the decline of New Livingston from territorial continuity service on Alghero - Rome - Fiumicino. The Council of State rejected the appeal of the Milan-based company, allowing Alitalia to operate the route again. Subsequently, on 7 October 2014, Livingston communicated ENAC (the Italian National Agency for Civil Aviation), the suspension of all flights, because of the collapse of tourism, especially the segment holiday to Egypt and the Mediterranean basin, which has collapsed after the Arab Spring and the consequent instability of the area, and the drastic reduction in demand for routes to Russia because of the ongoing political crisis. As a result, the ENAC took steps to suspend the air transport license of the airline.

In October 2015, Ryanair announced that it would be closing its base at Alghero and dropping 16 routes from October that year, leaving only five routes served by aircraft based elsewhere for the winter 2015–2016 season.

In July 2016, Ryanair announced it would re-establish its base in Alghero and resume many routes after the decision of Italian government to rescind the increase in airport taxes from October 2016.

As of November 2017, Alitalia and the Romanian low-cost company Blue Air have bases here, with a handful of several other low-cost companies, such as easyJet, Ryanair, Vueling and Wizz Air, also offering all-year-round flights to various destinations in Italy, Spain and Romania, but also seasonal flights to other European countries.

== Airlines and destinations ==
The following airlines operate regular scheduled and charter flights at Alghero–Fertilia Airport:

Airlines	Destinations
Aeroitalia	Rome–Fiumicino; Seasonal: Genoa
Air Mountain	Seasonal: Sion
Air Serbia	Seasonal: Belgrade
Discover Airlines	Seasonal: Munich (begins 4 June 2027)
ITA Airways	Milan-Linate
Ryanair	Bergamo, Bologna, Milan–Malpensa, Naples, Pisa, Warsaw–Modlin; Seasonal: Barcelona, Bari, Bratislava, Budapest, Catania, Charleroi, Cork, Dublin, Hahn, Katowice, London–Stansted, Madrid, Memmingen, Palermo, Pescara, Tirana, Venice
Transavia	Seasonal: Amsterdam
Volotea	Seasonal: Bordeaux, Florence, Paris–Orly, Turin, Verona
Wizz Air	Bucharest–Otopeni; Seasonal: Belgrade, Budapest, Skopje, Sofia, Tirana, Venice, Warsaw–Modlin

== Statistics ==
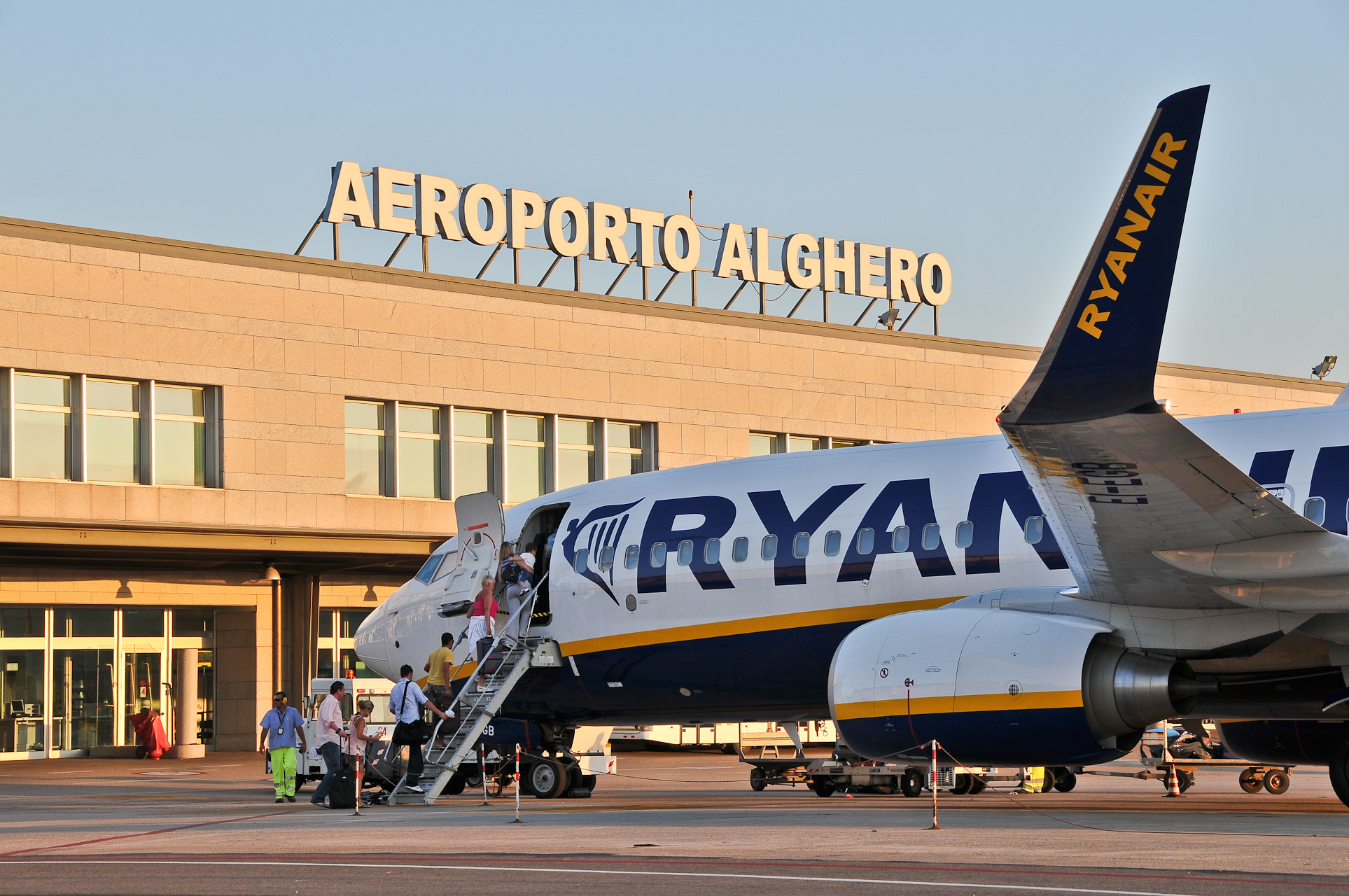
New departures terminal

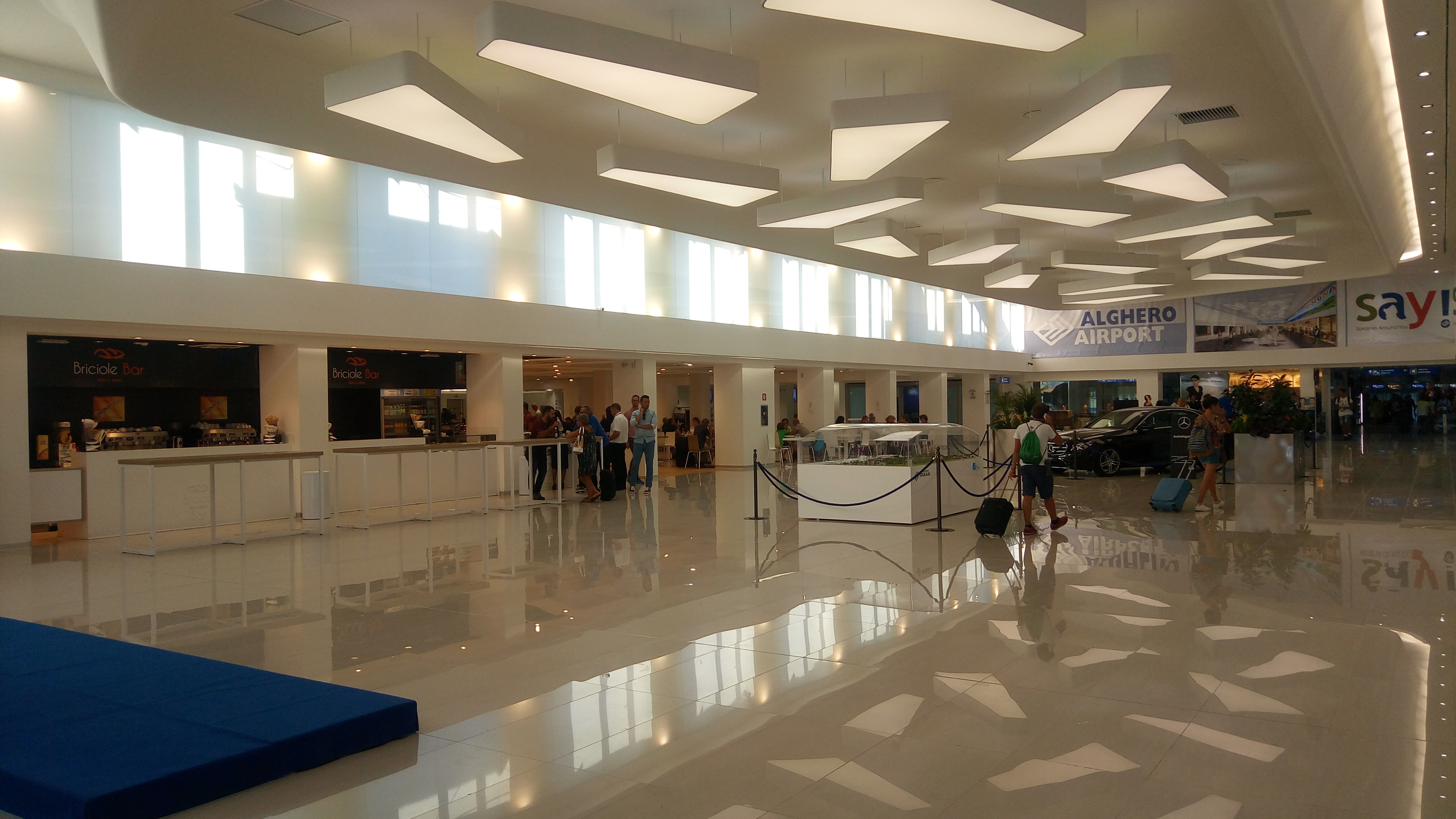
Terminal interior

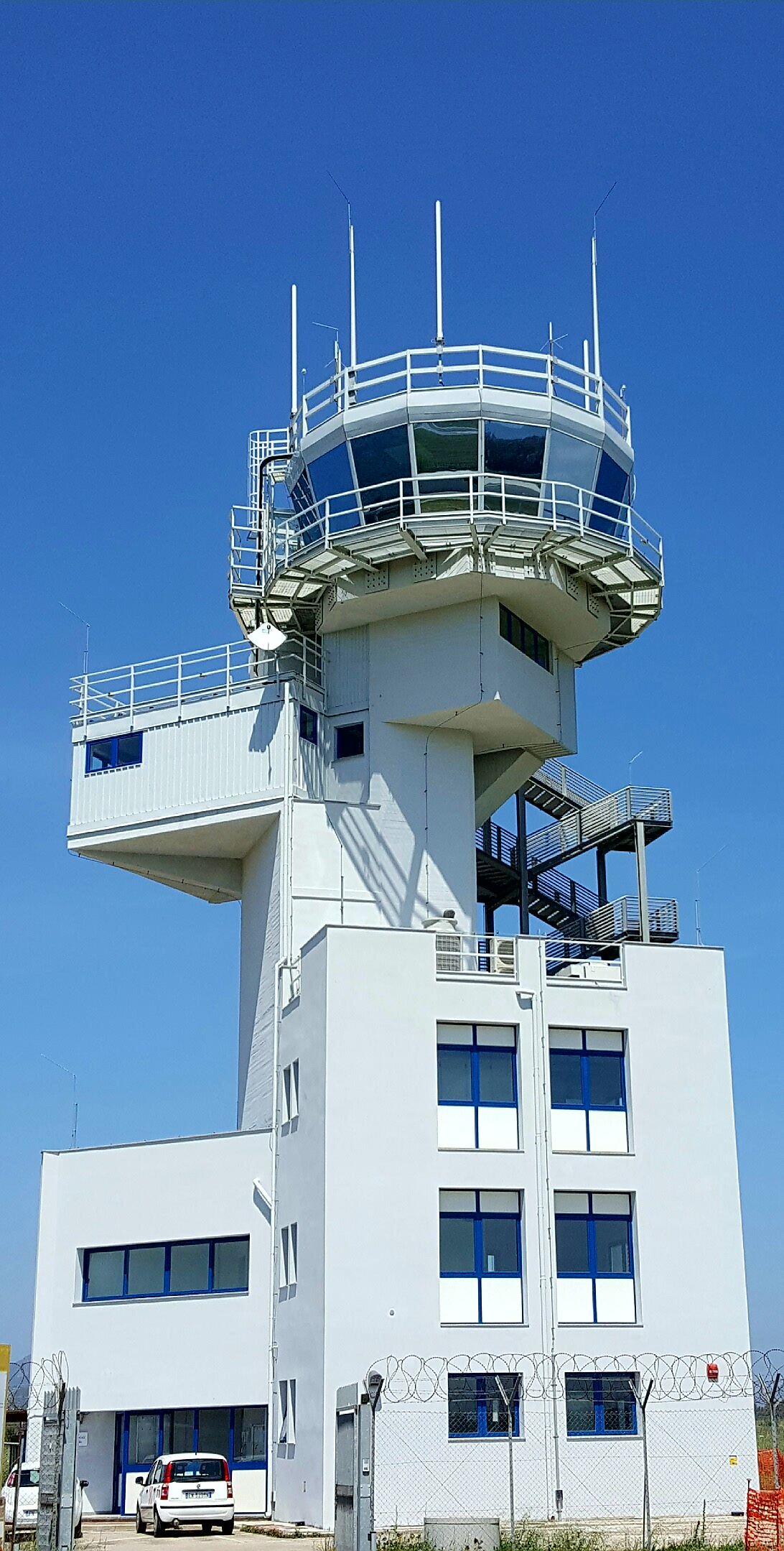
Control Tower

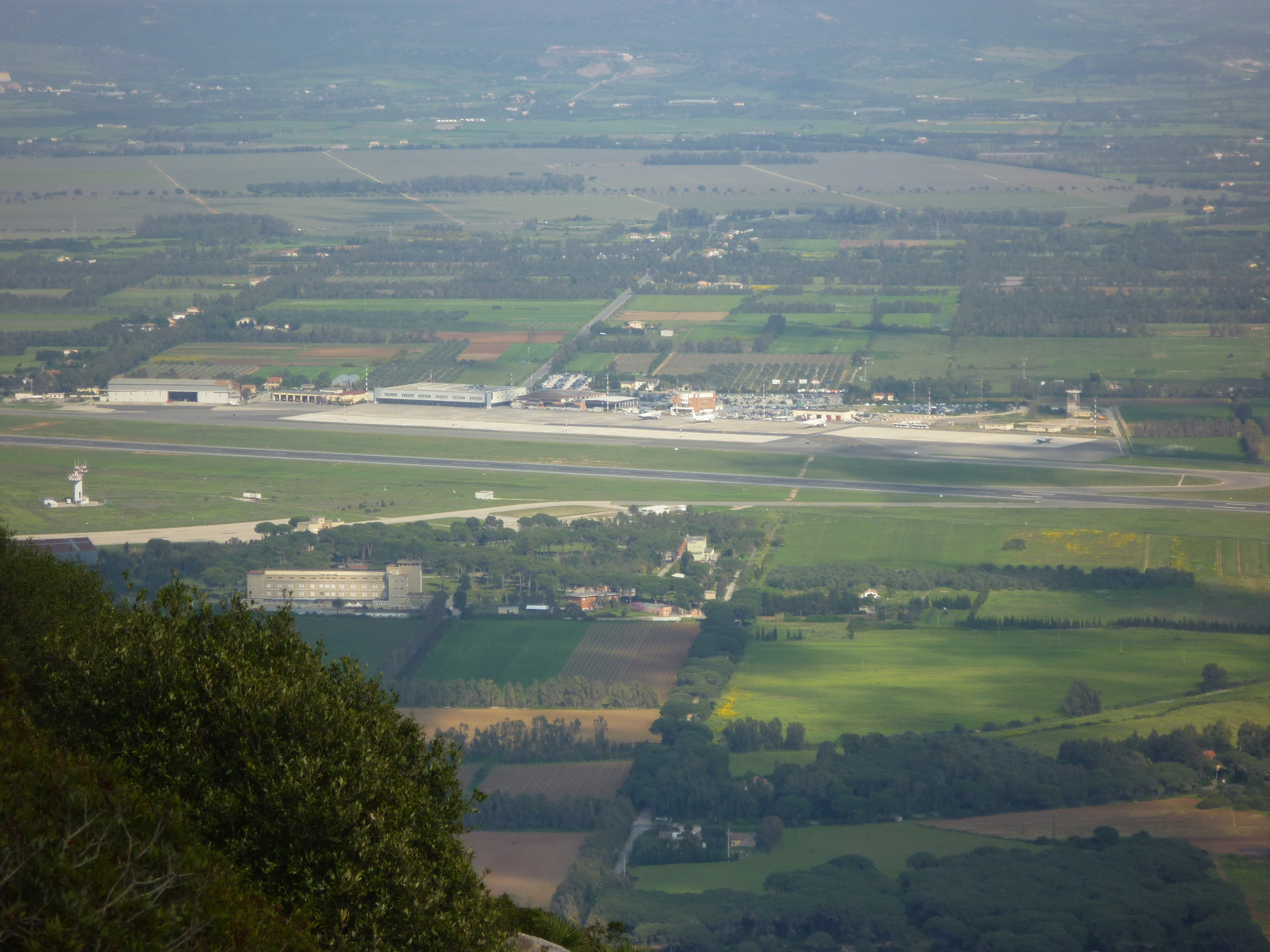
Aerial view

Passengers
	1998	1999	2000	2001	2002	2003	2004	2005	2006	2007
January	28,738	29,449	31,433	33,692	34,904	49,177	53,815	58,278	59,267	65,004
February	26,132	26,598	27,085	32,449	41,075	44,009	58,445	53,584	56,554	61,181
March	29,967	32,550	32,236	37,356	52,769	52,523	48,259 (Note: The airport was closed for major works from 14 to 23 March 2004.)	73,473	23,333 (Note: The airport was closed for major works from 18 to 24 March 2006.)	77,908
April	37,662	41,091	44,765	50,091	58,651	67,145	78,359	82,056	90,139	102,306
May	48,766	49,303	52,978	60,238	63,625	78,794	88,229	101,077	103,823	110,481
June	61,423	68,338	77,007	83,951	83,247	95,844	106,029	118,931	116,913	138,458
July	70,551	78,742	92,203	89,927	99,705	103,867	119,840	130,685	135,958	155,429
August	92,116	90,193	99,864	96,491	105,676	109,066	118,539	130,462	131,334	160,511
September	63,262	67,502	81,682	80,074	88,659	91,652	109,963	112,434	115,117	144,724
October	39,425	41,892	49,498	47,998	72,599	70,448	89,609	86,327	94,232	116,976
November	29,133	29,724	35,814	33,498	50,449	59,697	60,744	63,621	68,029	80,318
December	35,313	33,793	39,765	36,067	55,438	66,147	66,982	69,046	75,792	86,819
TOTAL	562,488	589,175	664,330	681,832	806,797	888,369	998,811	1,079,843	1,070,494	1,300,115
Source: Assaeroporti and the airport operating company.

	2008	2009	2010	2011	2012	2013	Δ%
January	75,982	65,711	72,705	77,596	75,971	70,095	▼7.7
February	74,374	65,869	66,656	71,541	60,446	63,142	▲4.5
March	94,633	77,388	84,954	93,557	87,740	85,233	▼2.9
April	106,558	124,493	96,361	122,610	129,832	129,492	▼0.3
May	130,918	132,683	117,563	132,852	135,698	143,175	▲5.5
June	143,355	167,749	139,665	158,626	165,120	178,768	▲8.3
July	168,082	200,181	176,922	191,089	199,599	215,224	▲7.8
August	181,585	208,485	193,025	202,272	210,407	224,562	▲6.9
September	143,439	172,797	150,076	160,327	168,251	176,386	▲4.8
October	114,057	129,685	123,883	133,509	125,498	–	
November	70,327	76,806	80,696	81,809	75,154	–	
December	77,551	85,169	85,711	88,466	85,445	–	
TOTAL	1,380,762	1,507,016	1,388,217	1,514,254	1,518,870	1,286,077	▲4.3
Source: Assaeroporti and the airport operating company.

Cargo (in tonnes)
	2000	2001	2002	2003	2004	2005	2006	2007	2008	2009	2010	2011	2012	2013	Δ%
January	133	165	178	78	95	52	46	65	61	129	84	110	116	1	▼99.3
February	133	168	149	90	74	57	51	52	72	147	99	110	112	1	▼99.3
March	152	175	106	97	50	60	24	60	54	157	136	126	145	1	▼99.6
April	126	161	100	95	94	48	51	48	56	146	119	133	120	1	▼99.2
May	169	199	116	111	82	54	49	64	57	145	127	135	145	1.2	▼99.2
June	179	199	117	105	102	53	60	64	60	147	129	137	135	6.6	▼95.1
July	210	193	130	134	207	73	21	68	73	176	139	141	143	6.8	▼95.3
August	187	178	112	102	138	72	61	71	158	129	111	134	126	7.5	▼94.0
September	190	175	119	118	107	64	62	83	183	168	138	142	148	–	
October	182	182	116	80	48	53	63	65	184	131	126	139	160	–	
November	153	166	100	95	88	52	61	63	168	118	131	130	149	–	
December	149	150	97	99	115	55	60	71	182	109	108	143	138	–	
TOTAL	1,963	2,111	1,440	1,204	1,200	693	609	774	1,308	1,702	1,447	1,580	1,637	25.4	▼97.6
Source: Assaeroporti

== Ground transportation ==
The airport can be reached from the city via the Strada Statale 42 and from the rest of the island via the SS 131 Carlo Felice Highway and the SS 291. The Sardinian transport operator ARST operates urban public transport lines between Alghero and the airport and also to Sassari, Olbia and Cagliari. There are also seasonal links by private companies from Cagliari and Santa Teresa Gallura.
