= Cuneo International Airport =

Cuneo International Airport Aeroporto Internazionale di Cuneo
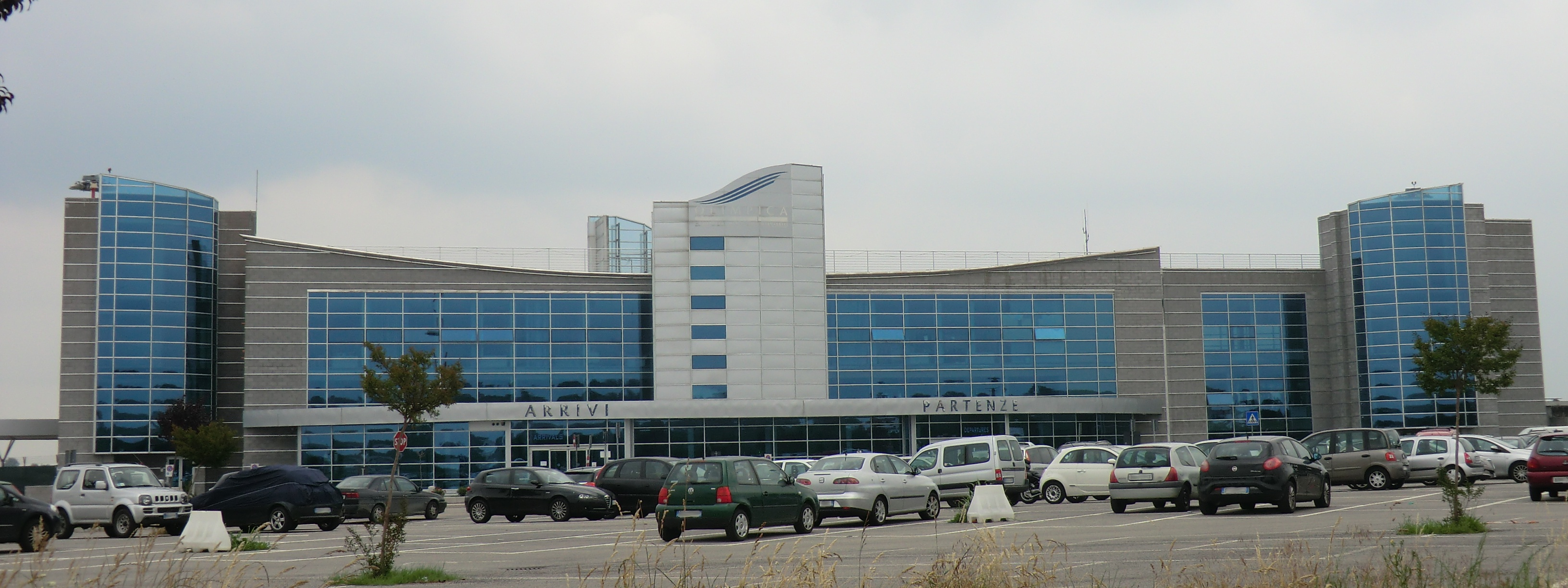
- IATA: CUF; ICAO: LIMZ

Summary
- Airport type: Public
- Operator: Società Gestione Aeroporto Cuneo (GEAC S.p.A.)
- Serves: Cuneo and Turin
- Location: Savigliano, Italy
- Elevation AMSL: 1,267 ft (386 m)
- Coordinates: 44°32′49″N 007°37′23″E
- Website: aeroporto.cuneo.it

Map
- Location of airport in Italy CUF (Italy)

Runways
Direction	Length		Surface
Direction	m	ft	Surface
03/21	2,104	6,903	Asphalt

Statistics (2024)
- Passengers: 105,428
- Passenger change 23-24: ▼ -7.4%
- Aircraft movements: 3,158
- Movements change 23-24: ▲4.1%
- Source: DAFIF; Statistics from Assaeroporti

Cuneo International Airport (Italian: Aeroporto di Cuneo-Levaldigi) (IATA: CUF, ICAO: LIMZ) also named Cuneo Levaldigi Airport or Turin Cuneo Airport by some low-cost airlines, is an airport serving Cuneo and Turin, Piedmont, Italy. It is the second airport of Piedmont, after Turin Airport.

== Facilities ==
The airport is located at an elevation of 1,267 feet (386 m) above mean sea level. It has one runway designated 03/21 with an asphalt surface measuring 2,104 by 45 metres (6,903 ft × 148 ft).

== Airlines and destinations ==
The following airlines operate regular scheduled and charter flights at Cuneo Airport:

Airlines	Destinations
Aeroitalia	Cagliari; Seasonal: Olbia
Air Arabia	Casablanca
Ryanair	Cagliari; Seasonal: Palermo
