= Parma Airport =

Airport in Italy

Parma Airport Aeroporto di Parma
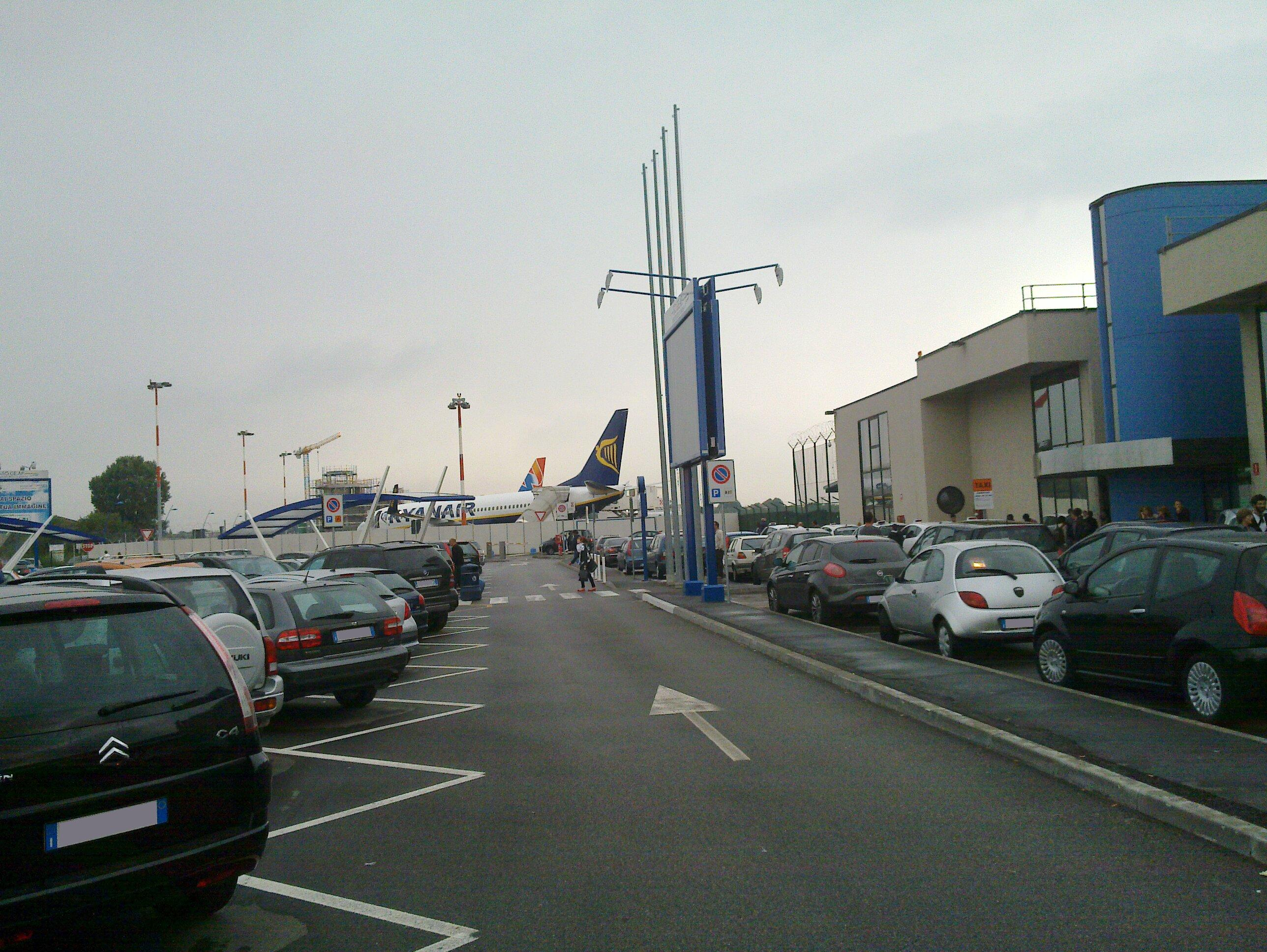
- IATA: PMF; ICAO: LIMP

Summary
- Airport type: Public
- Owner: Centreline Airport Partners (51%)
- Operator: Società Gestione Aeroporto Parma
- Serves: Parma, Emilia-Romagna, Italy
- Elevation AMSL: 161 ft (49 m)
- Coordinates: 44°49′20″N 010°17′43″E
- Website: www.parma-airport.it

Map
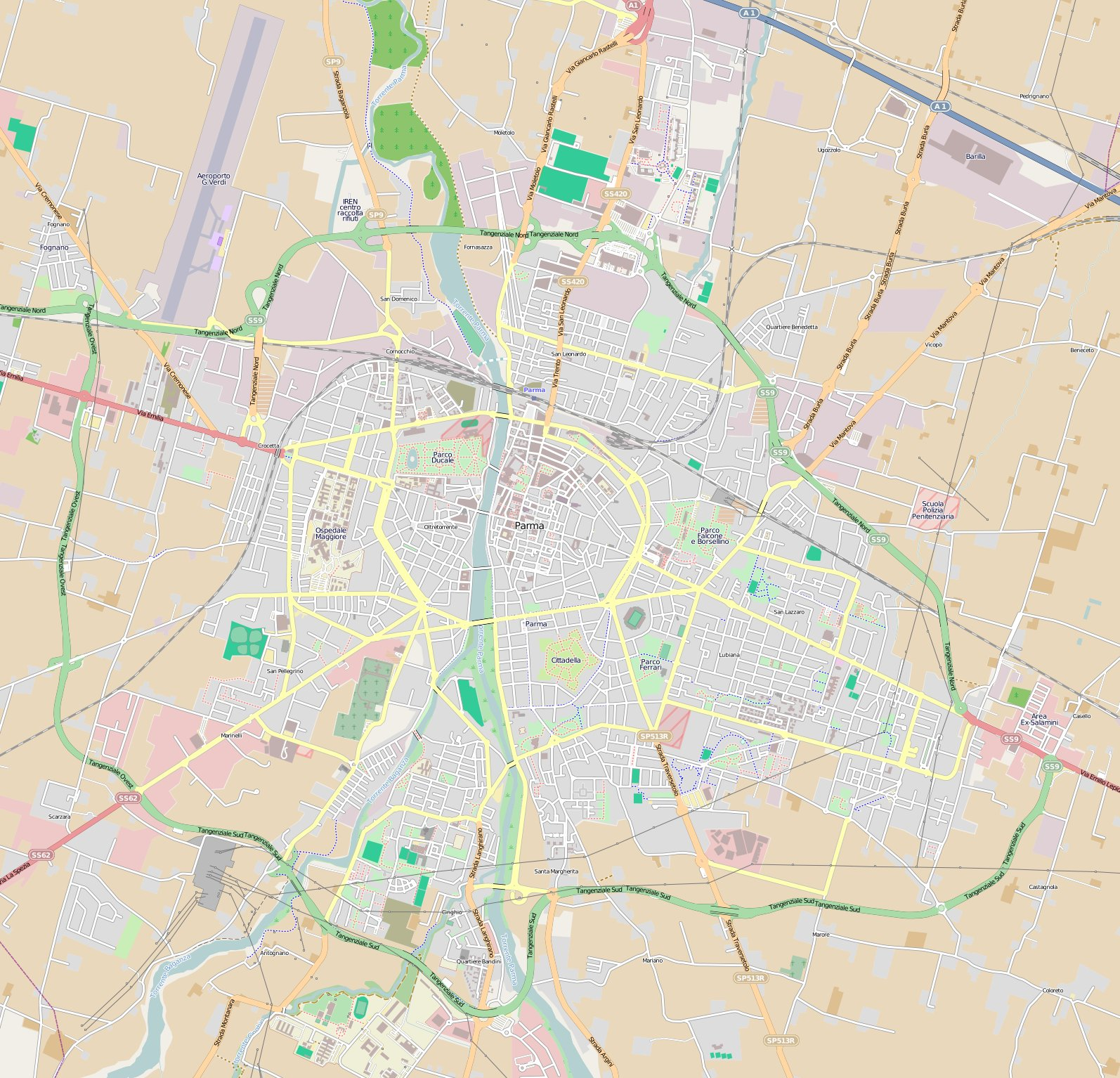
- Location within Parma Location within Emilia-Romagna Location within Italy

Runways
Direction	Length		Surface
Direction	m	ft	Surface
02/20	2,122	6,962	Asphalt

Statistics (2024)
- Passengers: 133,757
- Passenger change 23–24: ▼ -0.2%
- Aircraft movements: 4,565
- Movements change 23–24: ▼ -9.3%
- Source: Italian AIP at EUROCONTROL; Statistics from Assaeroporti

Parma Airport (Italian: Aeroporto di Parma, IATA: PMF, ICAO: LIMP) is located 1.3 NM (2.4 km; 1.5 mi) northwest of Parma, a city in the Emilia-Romagna region of Italy. The airport was opened on 5 May 1991. It is also known as Giuseppe Verdi Airport or Parma "Giuseppe Verdi" Airport, named after Giuseppe Verdi.

In July 2024, Centreline Airport Partners purchased a 51% shareholding.

== Airlines and destinations ==
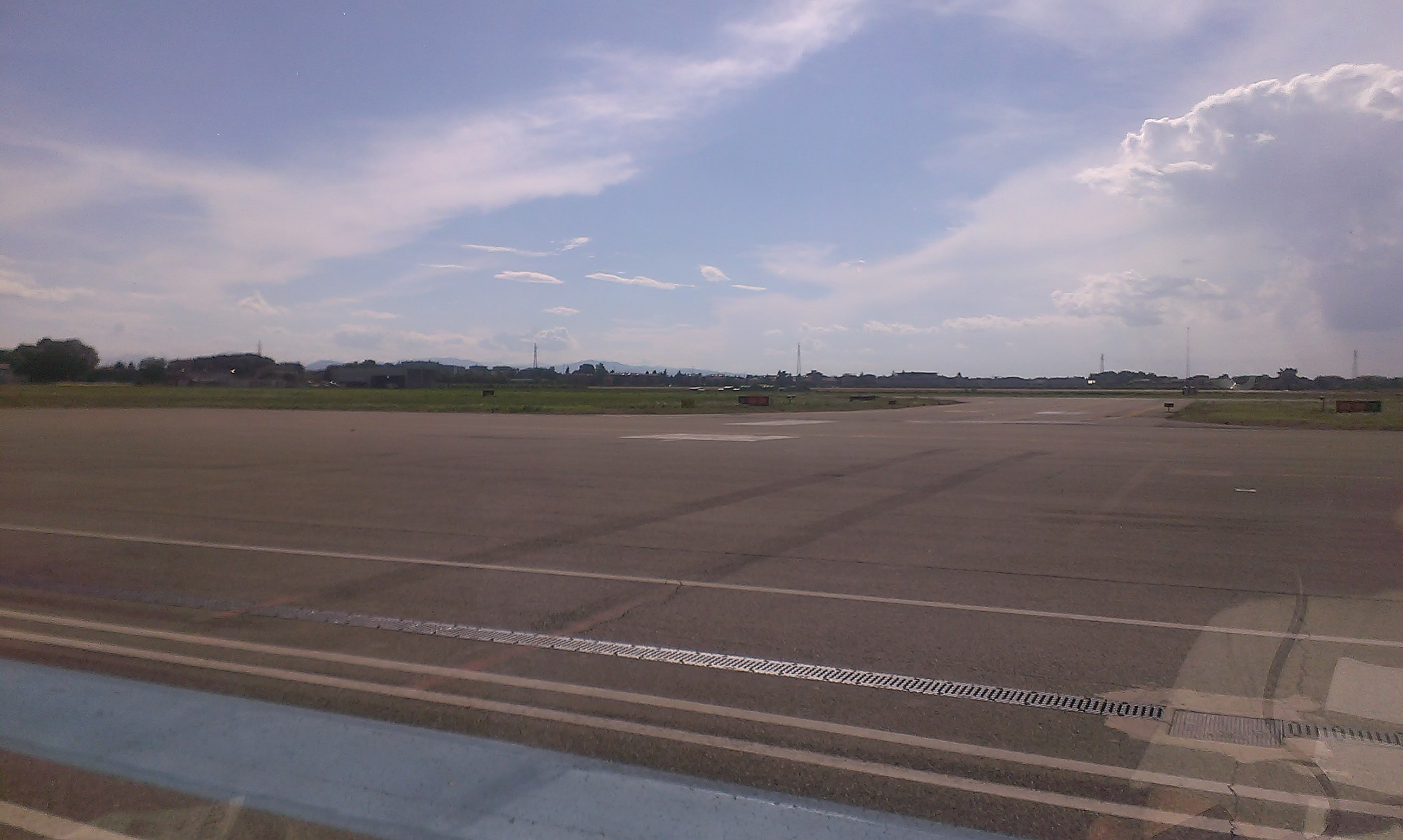
Apron view

The following airlines operate regular scheduled flights to and from Parma:

Airlines	Destinations
Aeroitalia	Seasonal: Olbia
FlyOne	Seasonal: Chișinău
Ryanair	Cagliari, London–Stansted, Palermo, Reggio Calabria, Tirana

== Ground transportation ==
Parma Airport is reachable in seven minutes by car or by taxi. Otherwise, it is possible to reach the airport by bus route 6, operated by TEP Parma.
