= Perugia San Francesco d'Assisi – Umbria International Airport =

Airport serving Perugia, Umbria, Italy

Perugia San Francesco d'Assisi – Umbria International Airport Aeroporto Internazionale dell'Umbria – Perugia San Francesco d'Assisi
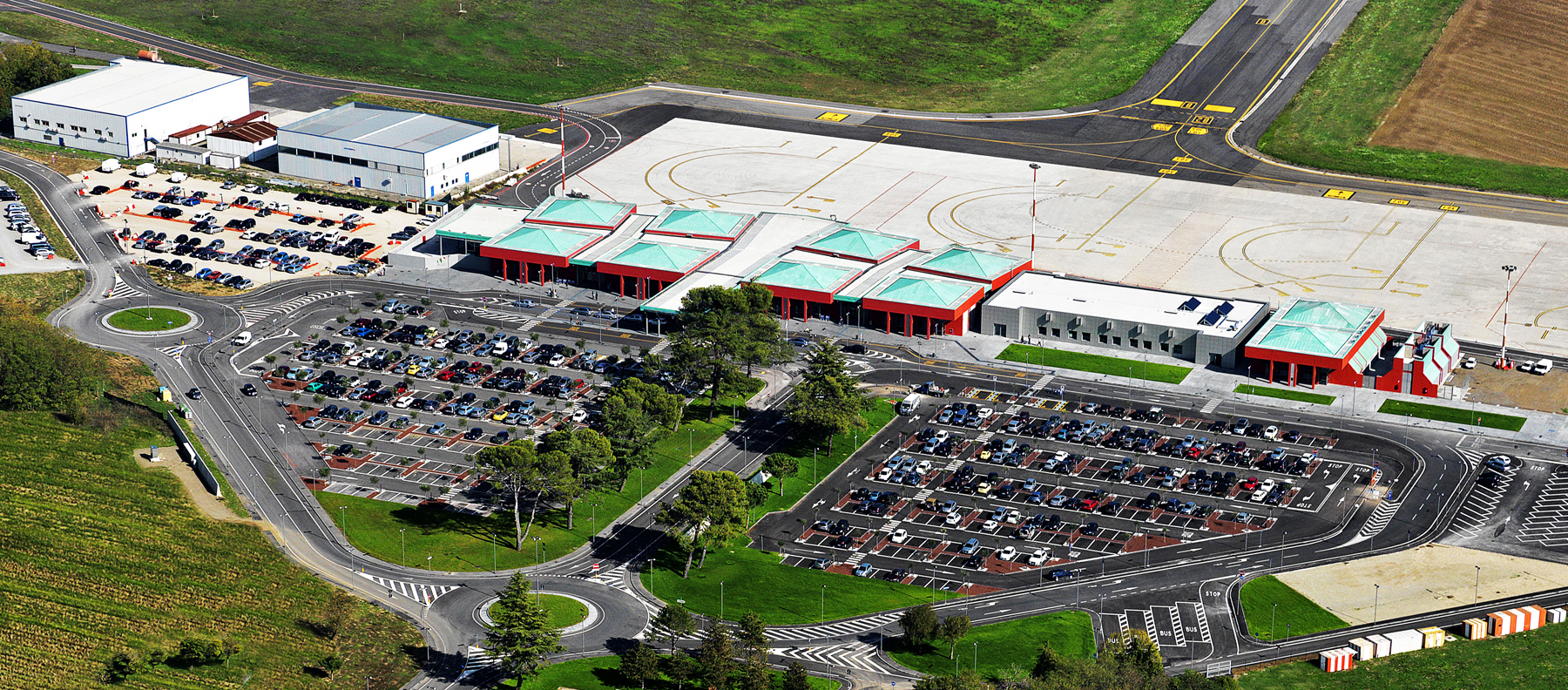
- IATA: PEG; ICAO: LIRZ

Summary
- Airport type: Public
- Serves: Perugia, Umbria, Italy
- Elevation AMSL: 693 ft (211 m)
- Coordinates: 43°05′45″N 012°30′47″E
- Website: airport.umbria.it

Map
- Location of airport in Italy PEG (Italy)

Runways
Direction	Length		Surface
Direction	m	ft	Surface
01/19	2,199	7,215	Asphalt

Statistics (2024)
- Passengers: 534,210
- Passenger change 23–24: ▲0.3%
- Aircraft movements: 6,582
- Movements change 23–24: ▲6.5%
- Source: Italian AIP at EUROCONTROL; Statistics from Assaeroporti

Perugia San Francesco d'Assisi – Umbria International Airport (Italian: Aeroporto Internazionale dell'Umbria – Perugia San Francesco d'Assisi; IATA: PEG, ICAO: LIRZ), formerly Perugia Sant'Egidio Airport, is an airport serving Perugia, the capital city of the region of Umbria in central Italy.

== Facilities ==
The airport is located at an elevation of 693 feet (211 m) above mean sea level. It has one runway designated 01/19 with an asphalt surface measuring 2,199 by 45 metres (7,215 ft × 148 ft). It was expanded in 2011, with the addition of new terminal facilities designed by the Italian architect Gae Aulenti and part-funded by a government grant awarded to celebrate the 150th anniversary of the unification of Italy.

== Airlines and destinations ==
The following airlines operate regular scheduled and charter flights at Perugia Airport:

Airlines	Destinations
Aeroitalia	Seasonal: Lamezia Terme, Olbia
British Airways	Seasonal: London–Heathrow
HelloFly	Seasonal: Lampedusa, Pantelleria
Ryanair	Cagliari, Catania, London–Stansted, Palermo; Seasonal: Barcelona, Brindisi, Bucharest–Otopeni, Charleroi, Kraków, Malta
Transavia	Seasonal: Rotterdam/The Hague
Wizz Air	Tirana

== Ground Transportation ==
=== Car ===
Perugia Airport is reachable by the E45-SS3 Bis (Ravenna-Cesena-Perugia-Terni).

=== Train ===
The nearest railway stations to the airport are Perugia (also known locally as Perugia Fontivegge), Perugia Ponte San Giovanni, and Bastia Umbra.

=== Bus ===
The airport is served by a limited number of services by the following regional bus routes operated by Busitalia Umbria (formerly by APM (1996–2010) and Umbria Mobilità (2010–2014)):

- E007 Perugia-Petrignano-Assisi
- E422 Perugia-Santa Maria degli Angeli-Foligno

There is also a shuttle bus (by ACAP-Sulga) between Perugia Railway Station and Perugia city centre.

=== Taxi ===
There are multiple taxi companies available.
