= Reggio Calabria Airport =

Reggio di Calabria Airport Aeroporto di Reggio di Calabria
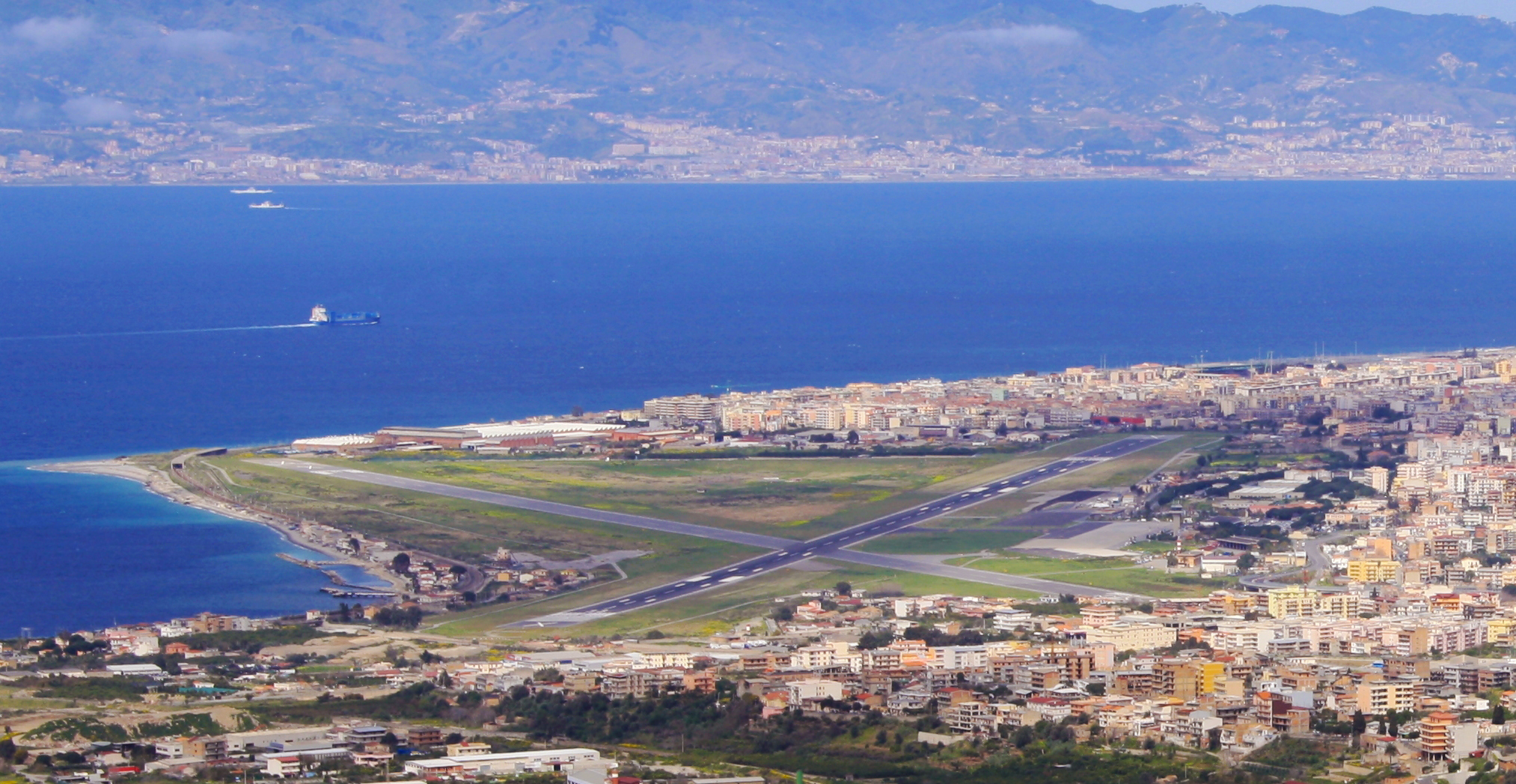
- IATA: REG; ICAO: LICR

Summary
- Airport type: Public & Military
- Operator: Sacal S.p.A.
- Serves: Reggio di Calabria, Messina
- Location: Reggio di Calabria
- Focus city for: Ryanair
- Built: 1939; 87 years ago
- Occupants: V Reparto di Volo della Polizia di Stato
- Elevation AMSL: 29.26 m (96.0 ft)
- Coordinates: 38°04′19″N 15°39′13″E
- Website: sacal.it/en/reggio-calabria-airport/

Map
- Location within Calabria Location within Italy

Runways
Direction	Length		Surface
Direction	m	ft	Surface
15/33	2,061	6,761	Asphalt
11/29	1,700	5,574	Asphalt

Statistics (2024)
- Passengers: 623,980
- Passenger change 21-22: ▲37.1%
- Aircraft movements: 7,463
- Movements change 23-24: ▲112.8%
- Source: Italian AIP at EUROCONTROL; Statistics from Assaeroporti

Reggio di Calabria "Tito Minniti" Airport (IATA: REG, ICAO: LICR), also known as Aeroporto dello Stretto (Airport of the Strait) is an airport located in Reggio Calabria, in southern Italy. It serves mainly the Metropolitan City of Reggio and the Province of Messina, and partially the Province of Vibo Valentia; more than 1,350,000 people. Daily flights depart and arrive from several Italian cities, and are seasonally augmented by flights to various other countries.

== History ==
Reggio military airport was inaugurated in 1939 (the first airport in Calabria), becoming operative for commercial flights in 1947; later it was named after Italian Royal Air Force war-hero Tito Minniti, who was born in Reggio Calabria. Its IATA airport code REG is derived from Reggio, Calabria's main city, which the airport is closest to. On the outskirts of the airport the training grounds of local football club Reggina Calcio are located.

In March 2017, Alitalia announced it would terminate all 56 weekly flights to and from the airport (to Milan, Rome and Turin) stating all routes were heavily loss-making. However, this decision was revoked shortly after.

In summer 2017, Sacal S.p.A. (Società aeroportuale calabrese), also managing Lamezia Terme, took over the management of the airport.

== Airlines and destinations ==
The following airlines operate regular scheduled and charter flights at Reggio Calabria Airport:

Airlines	Destinations
ITA Airways	Milan–Linate, Rome–Fiumicino
Ryanair	Barcelona, Bergamo, Bologna, Milan–Malpensa, Parma, Pisa, Turin, Venice; Seasonal: Beauvais, Katowice, London–Stansted

== Ground transport ==
The Reggio Calabria Airport is approximately 5 kilometres (3 mi) south of Reggio's historic city centre. It is accessible by car or public transport. The airport is reachable in 7 minutes by regional trains from Reggio Calabria Centrale or Melito di Porto Salvo. The airport has a dedicated railway station which has faced criticism by the local community, due to its location (2 km (1.2 mi) away from the terminal, on the wrong side of the runways) and the resulting low number of passengers which use it. Otherwise, the airport is reachable by bus routes 27 and 27/ from the University and San Brunello and by the Port-Airport direct route, all of which are operated by ATAM and with nearby towns and ports by various provincial bus operators.

There was also a projected pier to allow the docking of the ferries from Messina, allowing the residents of the Sicilian city to use the Reggio Calabria Airport instead of driving 100 kilometres (60 mi) south to Catania Airport. This pier was built, but the prevailing winds did not allow the ferries to dock. This issue, together with low passenger numbers have caused the pier to be abandoned and used by fishermen, becoming a symbol of waste of public money.
