= Crotone Airport =

Crotone Airport Aeroporto di Crotone-Sant'Anna
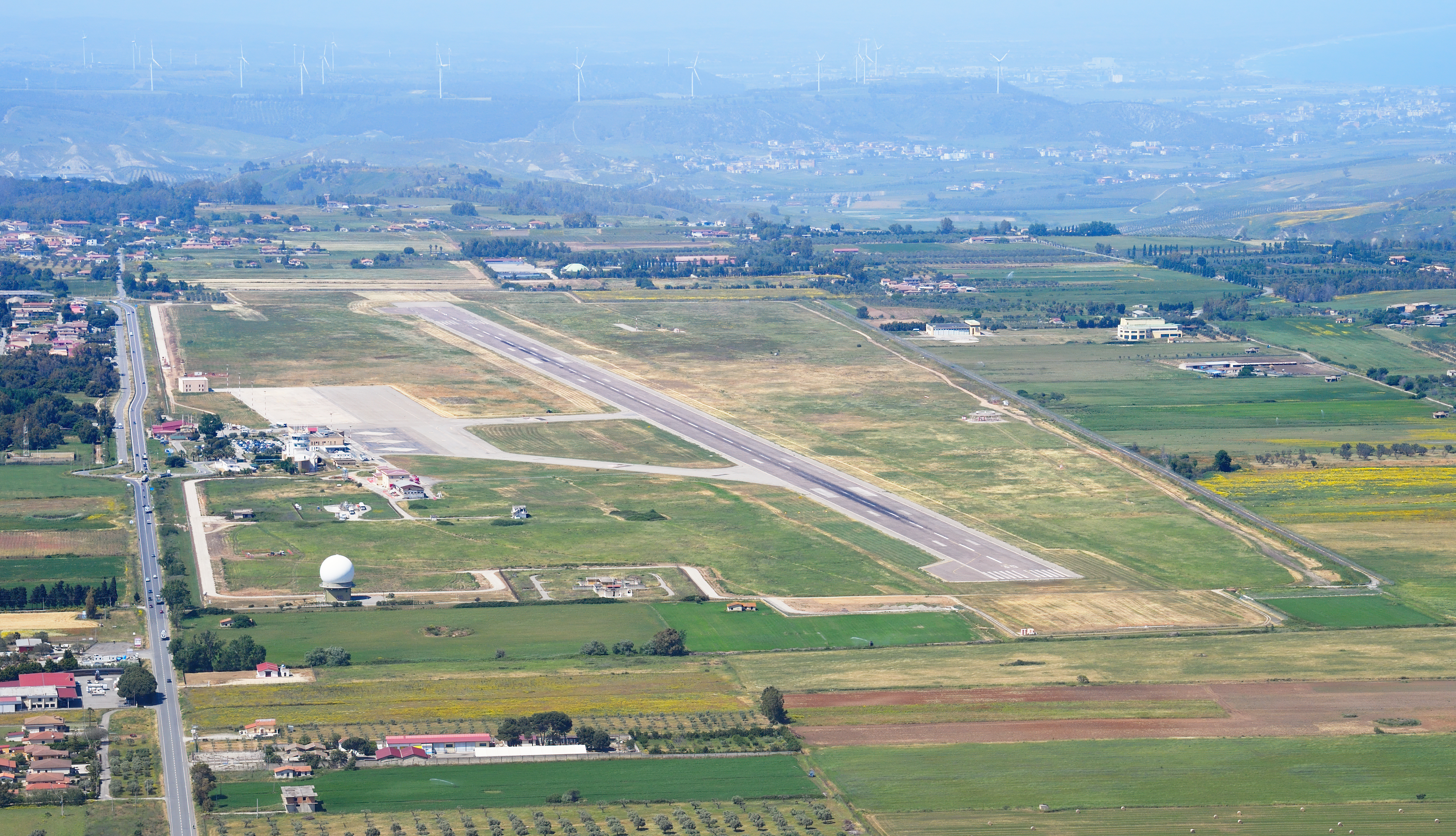
- IATA: CRV; ICAO: LIBC

Summary
- Airport type: Public
- Operator: Aeroporto S. Anna S.p.a.
- Serves: Crotone
- Location: Crotone, Italy
- Elevation AMSL: 521 ft (159 m)
- Coordinates: 38°59′50″N 17°04′49″E

Map
- Location within Calabria Location within Italy

Runways
Direction	Length		Surface
Direction	ft	m	Surface
17/35	6,562	2,000	Asphalt

Statistics (2024)
- Passengers: 273,250
- Passenger change 23-24: ▲19.8%
- Aircraft movements: 2,307
- Movements change 23-24: ▲10.6%
- Statistics from Assaeroporti

Crotone-Sant'Anna "Pitagora" Airport (Italian: Aeroporto di Crotone-Sant'Anna) (IATA: CRV, ICAO: LIBC) is a minor Italian international airport serving Crotone in Calabria.

== Facilities ==
The small airport features one two-storey passenger terminal building and a single runway. The terminal's main floor features the arrivals and departures areas as well as some basic passenger facilities while the upper level contains administration offices. The apron features three stands for mid-sized aircraft such as the Boeing 737-800 directly in front of the terminal building which are used by walk-boarding as well as four more bus-boarding stands to the north of the terminal.

== Airlines and destinations ==
The following airlines operate regular scheduled, seasonal and charter flights to and from Crotone:

Airlines	Destinations
Ryanair	Bologna, Bucharest, Milan-Bergamo, Milan-Malpensa, Turin, Venice-Treviso, Weeze
Sky Alps	Rome–Fiumicino

== Access ==
The airport is located next to European route E90 south of Crotone. The city can be reached by local bus service (Romano Bus Lines); a taxi rank and a car hire agency are also available.

== See also ==
- List of airports in Italy
