= Ancona Airport =

Airport serving Ancona, Marche, Italy

Ancona Airport Aeroporto Ancona
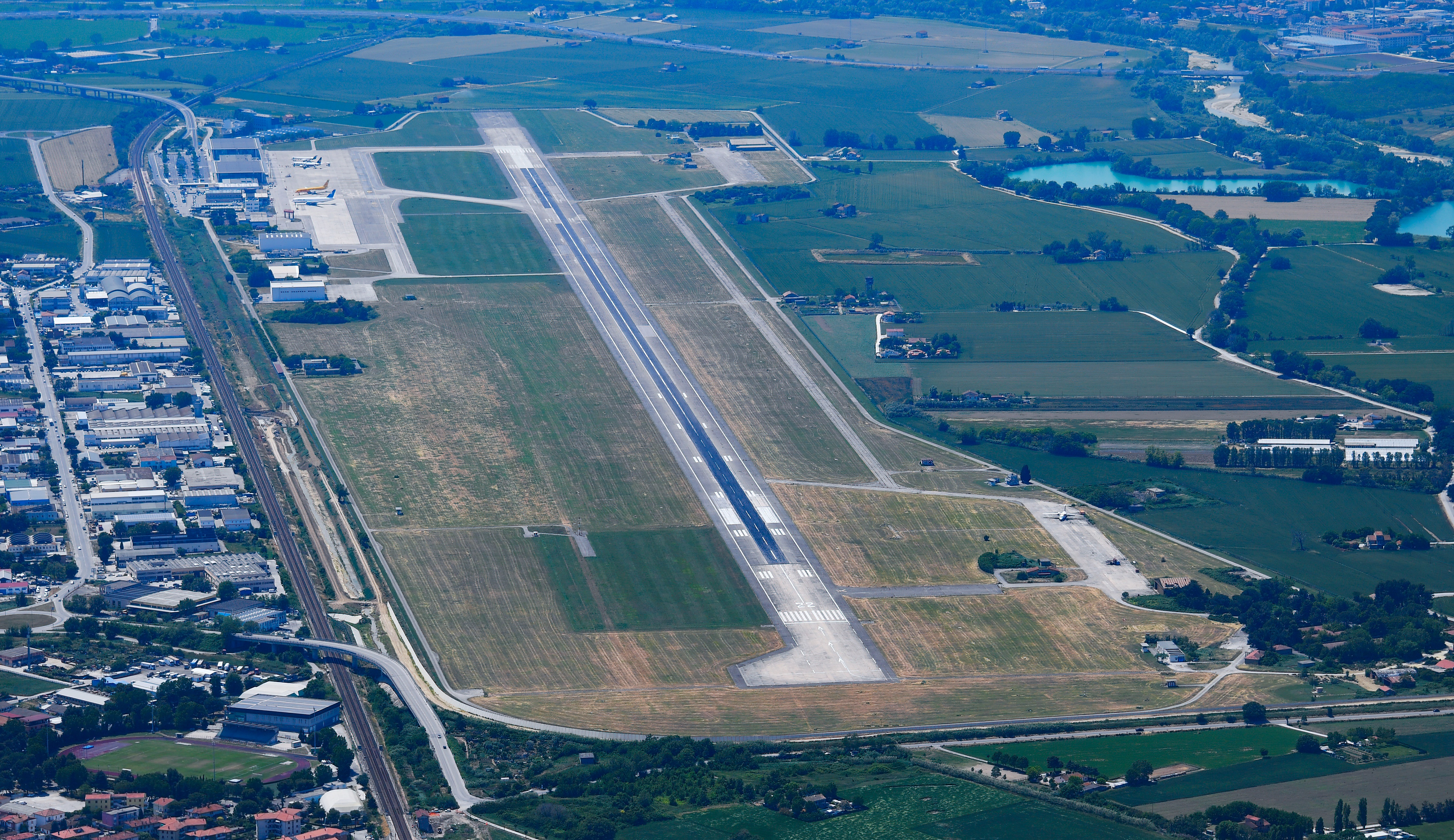
- IATA: AOI; ICAO: LIPY

Summary
- Airport type: Public
- Owner: Njord Partners
- Operator: Ancona International Airport S.p.A.
- Serves: Ancona, Italy
- Elevation AMSL: 49 ft (15 m)
- Coordinates: 43°36′58″N 013°21′44″E
- Website: www.ancona-airport.com

Map
- Location of the airport in Italy AOI/LIPY (Italy)

Runways
Direction	Length		Surface
Direction	m	ft	Surface
04/22	2,962	9,718	Asphalt

Statistics (2025)
- Passengers: 606,633
- Passenger change 24–25: ▲1.1%
- Aircraft movements: 10,831
- Movements change 24–25: ▼ -9.2%
- Source: DAFIF; Statistics from Assaeroporti

Ancona Airport (Italian: Aeroporto di Ancona) (IATA: AOI, ICAO: LIPY), also known as Falconara Airport and Marche Airport, is an airport serving Ancona and the Marche region of central Italy. It is located approximately 12 km (7.5 mi) west of Ancona, in Falconara Marittima. The full official name refers to the Renaissance artist Raphael, who was born in Urbino in the Marche.

== History ==
The first proposal to build and manage an airport in the Marche region by a local authority emerged in 1929, initiated by the Province of Ancona. It was through the Province's efforts that the history of Ancona Airport began, constructed with authorisation from the Ministry of Aeronautics in the Contrada Fiumesino area of Falconara. Initially designated as a military emergency landing field for aircraft forced to make an unscheduled descent, the airfield was developed at a cost of 2,000,000 lire for the Province. In 1933, the ownership of the land was transferred to the state. Then, in 1939, Falconara received its first official recognition when it was formally registered on the national list of civil airports.

During World War II, the airport was damaged and later occupied by the Allies, who established a NATO base there in 1950. The military presence significantly delayed efforts to restore the airport. In 1960, the Province, along with other local authorities, launched a promotional initiative to enhance airport infrastructure and encourage air travel. As a result, the first regular biweekly flights to Rome, Pescara, and Milan were introduced in 1963, followed by connections to Bari and Venice in 1964.

In 1965, with an investment of 67,000,000 lire, the involved authorities constructed a new terminal building equipped with offices and essential services. On February 5, 1968, they established Aerdorica S.r.l., tasked with promoting air traffic, managing airport services, and planning the expansion of the airport to meet the growing demands of civil air transport. The company developed the airport’s master plan and acquired the land designated as the foundation for the new civil airport. Construction began in 1977, leading to the inauguration of Raffaello Sanzio Airport near Castelferretti on July 16, 1981.

A major modernisation project was completed in June 2004 with the inauguration of the new terminal, designed by Volkwin Marg, a member of Gerkan, Marg and Partners.

Since June 2021, Ancona International Airport S.p.A. has taken over the management of the airport from Aerdorica. Alongside this transition, the airport was officially renamed Ancona International Airport – Raffaello Sanzio.

== Facilities ==
The airport lies at an elevation of 49 feet (15 m) above mean sea level. It has one runway designated 04/22 with an asphalt surface measuring 2,962 by 45 metres (9,718 ft × 148 ft).

== Airlines and destinations ==
=== Passenger ===
The following airlines operate scheduled services:

Airlines	Destinations
Air Dolomiti	Seasonal: Munich (ends 25 October 2026)
DAT	Milan–Linate, Rome–Fiumicino
Ryanair	Catania, Charleroi, London–Stansted; Seasonal: Kraków, Weeze
Volotea	Catania, Palermo (resumes 6 November 2026), Paris–Orly; Seasonal: Barcelona, Madrid, Olbia
Wizz Air	Tirana

=== Cargo ===
The following cargo services are operated at the airport:

Airlines	Destinations
DHL Aviation	Milan–Malpensa, Sarajevo
FedEx Express	Rome–Fiumicino
UPS Airlines	Bergamo, Cologne/Bonn

== Ground transportation ==
=== Aerobus ===
The airport is connected to Ancona and Falconara Marittima via piazza Cavour, piazza Kennedy, Ancona railway station, Ancona Torrette railway station, Falconara Marittima railway station, normally in coincidence with the operating flights.

=== Car ===
The airport is found on Strada statale 76 della Val d'Esino in directions of both Jesi and Falconara Marittima. People travelling on the Autostrada A14 need to exit at "Ancona Nord" and join Strada statale 76 della Val d'Esino.

=== Railway ===
A small railway station, Castelferretti-Falconara Aeroporto, is situated just outside the airport. Regional trains bound to Ancona, Jesi, Fabriano, Foligno, Orte and Rome departs from there.
