= Lamezia Terme International Airport =

Lamezia Terme International Airport Aeroporto Internazionale di Lamezia Terme
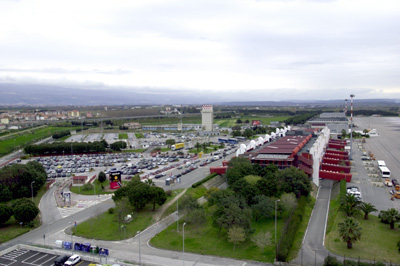
- IATA: SUF; ICAO: LICA

Summary
- Airport type: Public
- Operator: Sacal S.p.A.
- Serves: Province of Catanzaro
- Location: Lamezia Terme, Italy
- Focus city for: Ryanair
- Elevation AMSL: 46 ft (14 m)
- Coordinates: 38°54′19″N 16°14′32″E
- Website: https://sacal.it/en/lamezia-terme-airport/

Map
- Location within Calabria Location within Italy

Runways
Direction	Length		Surface
Direction	ft	m	Surface
10/28	9,900	3,017	Asphalt

Statistics (2024)
- Passengers: 2,713,811
- Passenger change 23–24: ▼ -4.4%
- Aircraft movements: 23,843
- Movements change 23–24: ▼ -4%
- Cargo (tons): 1,773.2
- Cargo change 23–24: ▲6.2%
- Statistics from Assaeroporti

Lamezia Terme International Airport (Italian: Aeroporto Internazionale di Lamezia Terme "Sant'Eufemia") (IATA: SUF, ICAO: LICA) is an airport in the Sant'Eufemia district of Lamezia Terme, Calabria, Italy. It is the principal airport of Calabria. Additionally, a military helicopter unit, the 2° Reggimento dell'Aria "Sirio", is based near the airport.

== History ==
The decision to build a large modern airport was made in the 1960s to stimulate the economy and tourism in southern Italy. The official opening took place in June 1976, when the first Itavia flight from Rome Ciampino Airport landed here. Initially, the airport was conceived as a central hub serving key cities in the region, including Catanzaro, Crotone and Cosenza.

A key stage in the airport's development was 1990, when it received international status. This event coincided with the FIFA World Cup held in Italy and gave a powerful boost to passenger traffic. In the following decades, the airport underwent several waves of modernization to meet growing demands. The runway and apron were expanded, and the passenger terminal was repeatedly extended and updated.

== Airlines and destinations ==
The following airlines operate regular scheduled and charter flights at Lamezia Terme Airport:

Airlines	Destinations
Aeroitalia	Seasonal: Cagliari, Perugia
Air Transat	Seasonal: Toronto–Pearson
Austrian Airlines	Seasonal: Vienna
Condor	Seasonal: Frankfurt
easyJet	Basel/Mulhouse, Milan–Malpensa; Seasonal: Geneva, Nice, Paris–Orly
Edelweiss Air	Zurich
Eurowings	Seasonal: Cologne/Bonn, Düsseldorf, Hannover, Innsbruck, Salzburg, Stuttgart
ITA Airways	Milan–Linate, Rome–Fiumicino
Lufthansa	Seasonal: Frankfurt
Luxair	Seasonal: Luxembourg
Neos	Seasonal: Milan–Malpensa, Verona
Ryanair	Bergamo, Bologna, Bremen (begins 25 October 2026), Bucharest–Otopeni, Genoa, Hahn, London–Stansted, Malta, Memmingen, Milan–Malpensa, Pisa, Sofia, Tirana, Turin, Verona; Seasonal: Budapest, Charleroi, Karlsruhe/Baden-Baden, Kraków, Madrid, Saarbrücken, Treviso, Trieste, Valencia, Venice, Vienna, Wrocław
SkyAlps	Seasonal: Bolzano
Smartwings	Seasonal: Brno, Prague; Seasonal charter: Ostrava, Warsaw-Chopin
TUI Airways	Seasonal: London–Gatwick, Manchester
TUI fly Belgium	Seasonal: Brussels
Wizz Air	Bratislava, Milan–Malpensa (begins 25 October 2026), Rome–Fiumicino (begins 25 October 2026), Turin (begins 25 October 2026), Warsaw–Chopin; Seasonal: Budapest, Katowice, Sofia
