= Sicily Airport =

Airports in Sicily

Sicily Airport may refer to one of the airports listed below.

- Catania International Airport, serving Catania
- Comiso Vincenzo Magliocco Airport, near Ragusa
- Palermo International Airport, serving Palermo
- Palermo-Boccadifalco Airport, also serving Palermo, used for general aviation
- Lampedusa Airport, serving the island of Lampedusa
- Pantelleria Airport, serving the island of Pantelleria (also used as a military airport)
- Trapani Birgi Vincenzo Florio Airport, serving Trapani (also used as a military airport)
- Trapani-Milo Airport, only used by the Italian Space Agency

Military airports:

- Naval Air Station Sigonella

It may also refer to one of the former airports of Sicily listed here: Former Airports
