= List of airports in Sicily =

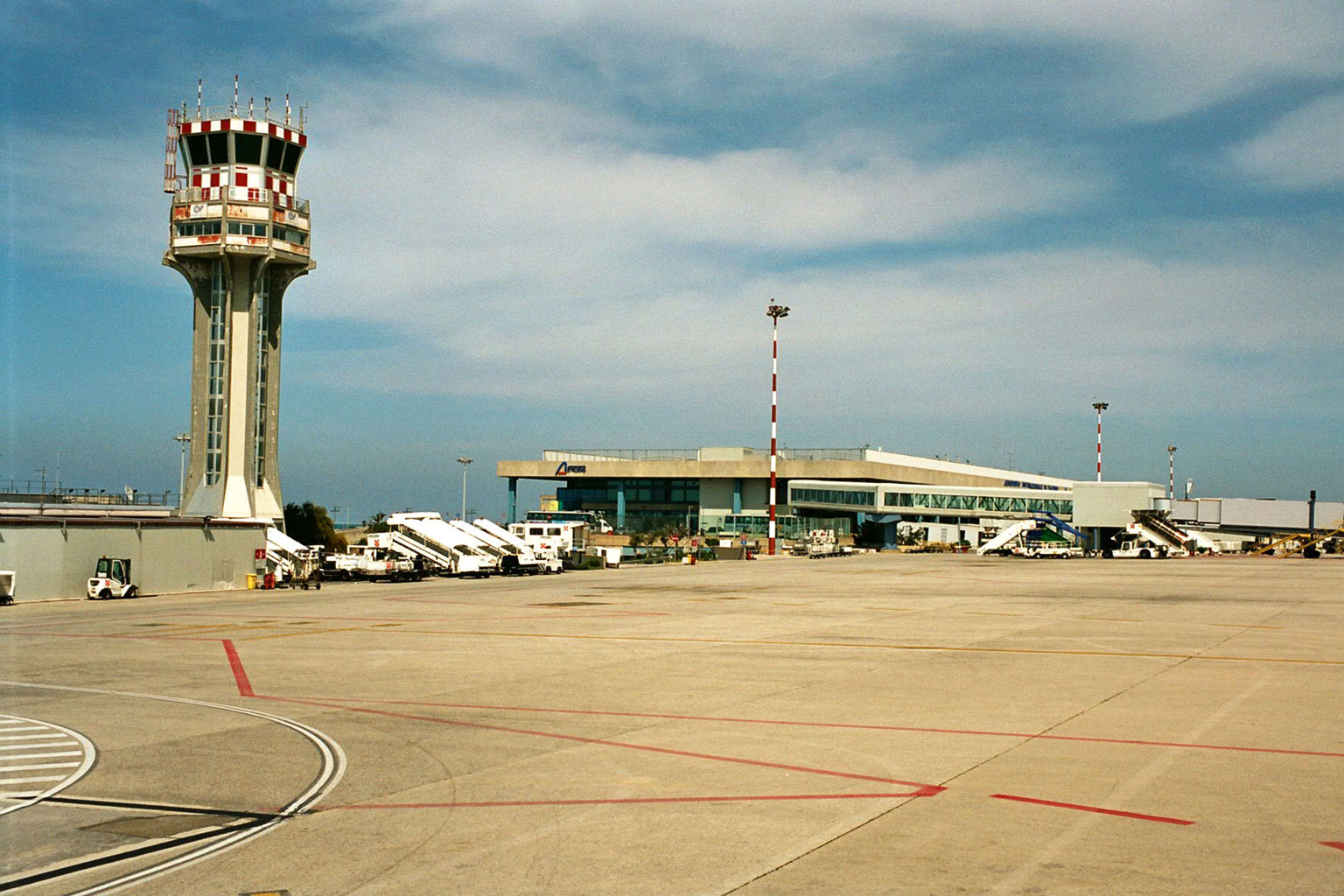
Palermo's terminal and apron.

This is a list of airports in Sicily, grouped by type and sorted by location.

On the island of Sicily there are six main airports and several smaller airfields catering to general aviation. There are also two small airports on the Sicilian islands of Lampedusa and Pantelleria. In 2011 the airports of Sicily collectively handled 13,257,369 passengers.

== History ==
The first airfield to open on the island was Catania Airport in May 1924 followed by Palermo–Boccadifalco Airport that was opened on 28 June 1931. In the 1930s, during the Italian fascist era, several airfields such as Trapani–Milo Airport (1936), Comiso Airport (1937), Pantelleria Airport (1938) and Ponte Olivo Airfield were built to control the Mediterranean Sea but during World War II all airfields on the islands were heavily bombarded by the British Royal Air Force based on Malta. The construction of Trapani–Chinisia Airfield was completed in 1949 and Trapani–Milo Airport was closed. In 1959 the American military took over the old airfield at Sigonella that had been abandoned since the end of the war. During the 1950s, Palermo's airport was the third-busiest airport by volume of traffic in Italy and construction for a bigger airport began. The new Palermo–Punta Raisi Airport opened in 1960. In 1961, with the completion of Trapani–Birgi Airport commercial flights were moved to the new airport leaving only military activity at Trapani–Chinisia, which eventually closed altogether in 1970. In 1968 Lampedusa Airport was completed.

== Airports ==
Many of the closed and some of the active airports were originally opened before IATA and ICAO codes were used but each Italian airport had an ID number used by the Italian Regia Aeronautica to codify the airfield.

=== Active airports ===
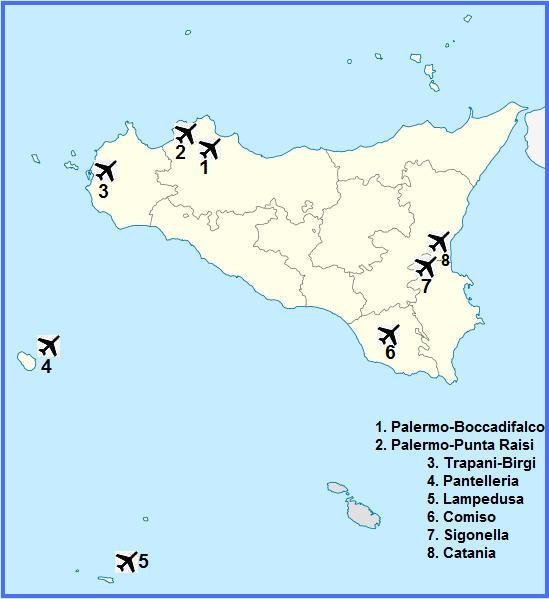
Map of airports in Sicily as in 2011

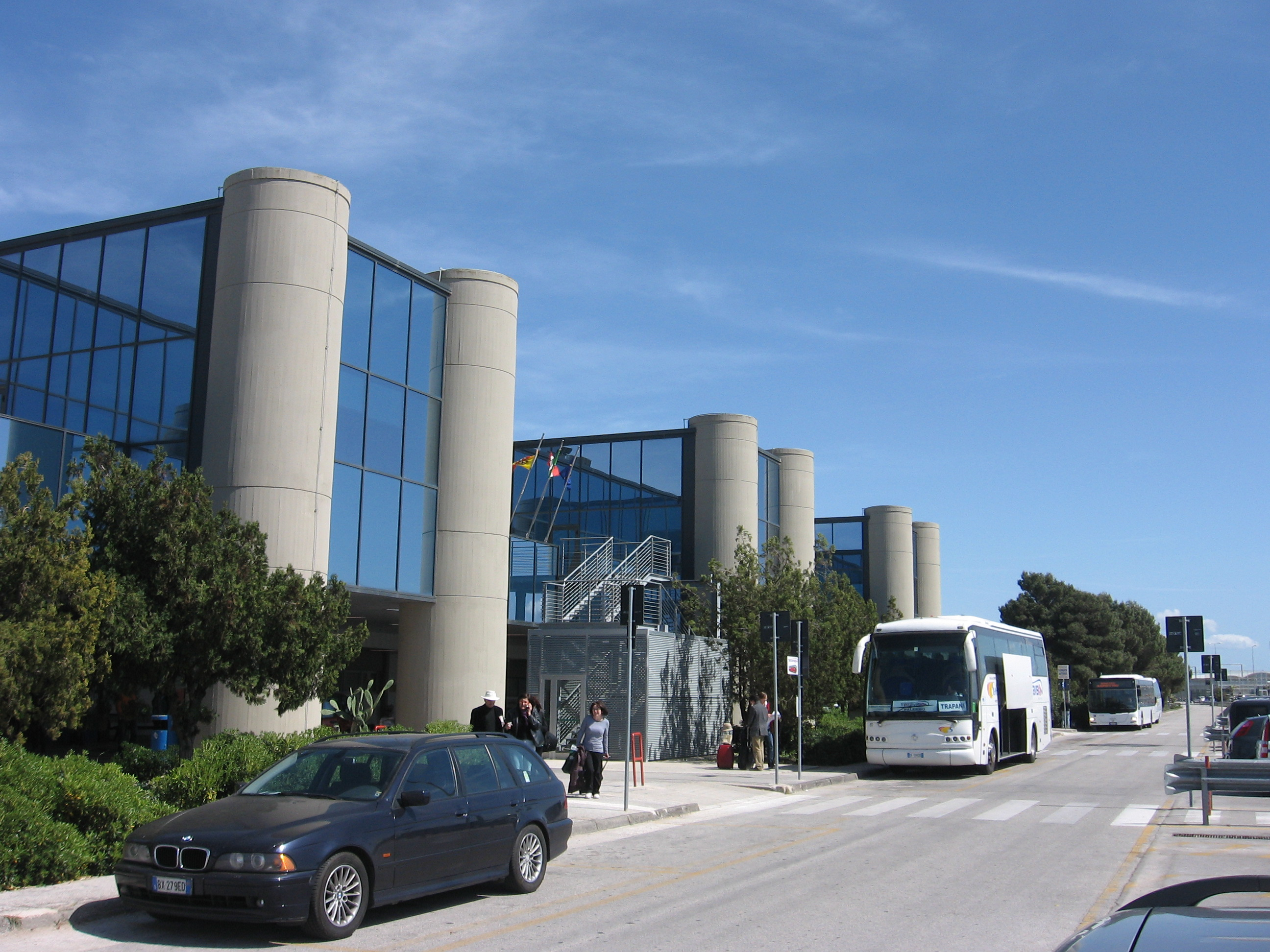
Trapani's terminal (exterior)

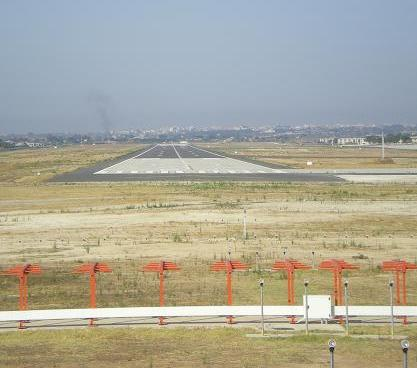
Comiso's new runway

Airport names shown in bold have scheduled passenger service on commercial airlines.

Location	ICAO	IATA	Old ID	Airport name	Total passengers 2013
International airports
Catania	LICC	CTA	503	**Catania Airport**	6,400,127
Palermo	LICJ	PMO		**Palermo–Punta Raisi Airport**	4,349,672
Trapani	LICT	TPS		**Trapani–Birgi Airport**	1,878,557
Comiso	LICB	CIY	508	**Comiso Airport**	59,513
National airports
Lampedusa	LICD	LMP		**Lampedusa Airport**	170,274
Pantelleria	LICG	PNL	515	**Pantelleria Airport**	117,826
Palermo	LICP	—	507	Palermo–Boccadifalco Airport	n.a.
Military airports
Sigonella	LICZ	NSY		Naval Air Station Sigonella	n.a.

=== Former airports ===
Location	Old ID	Airport name	Note
Former airports
Trapani	514	Trapani–Milo Airport	closed in 1949, today used by the ISA as a launch site for stratospheric balloons
Trapani	516	Trapani–Chinisia Airfield	closed in 1970
Gela	502	Ponte Olivo Airfield	closed in 1962
Castelvetrano	511	Castelvetrano Airfield	closed in 1960s
Sciacca	501	Sciacca Airfield	abandoned after WWII
Acate	504	Biscari–Santo Pietro Airfield	abandoned after WWII
Gerbini	505	Gerbini Airfield	abandoned after WWII
Milazzo	506	Milazzo Airfield	abandoned after WWII
Marsala	513	Marsala–Carcitella Airfield	abandoned after WWII
Pachino	517	Pachino Airfield	abandoned after WWII
Licata	—	Licata Airfield	abandoned after WWII
Agrigento	—	Agrigento Airfield	abandoned after WWII
Cassibile	—	Cassibile Airfield	abandoned after WWII

=== Former water aerodromes ===
During the 1920s and 1930s flights were operated from the Sicilian water aerodromes of Siracusa and Marsala to the cities of Rome and Naples on the Italian mainland and to the cities of Tripoli and Benghazi in Libya, using seaplanes and amphibious aircraft. There was also a postal service from Palermo's harbour there to Naples and a passenger-service on the route Rome–Palermo–Tunis. Enna–Nicoletti Water Aerodrome, located on a lake in central Sicily, was opened in 2007 and closed the following year.

Location	ICAO	Old ID	Airport name	Note
Former water aerodromes
Palermo	—	—	Palermo–Porto Water Aerodrome	open
Enna	—	—	Enna–Nicoletti Water Aerodrome	closed in 2008
Siracusa	LICK	510	Siracusa–De Filippis Water Aerodrome	closed in 2008
Marsala	LIFM	512	Marsala–Stagnone Water Aerodromes	closed in the 1990s
Augusta	—	509	Augusta–Spagnolo Water Aerodrome	closed in 1991
