= Trapani–Milo Airport =

Coordinates: 38°00′20″N 12°35′02″E

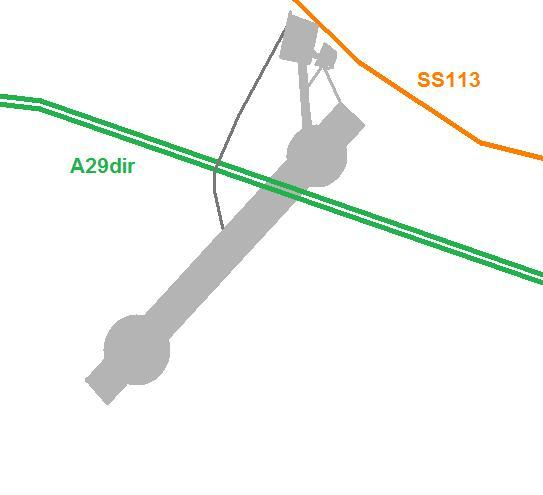
- Trapani–Milo runway relative to the motorway
- IATA: none; ICAO: none

Summary
- Airport type: military
- Elevation AMSL: 394 ft / 120 m
- Interactive map of Trapani–Milo Airport

Runways
Direction	Length		Surface
Direction	ft	m	Surface
05/23		1,100	Asphalt

Trapani–Milo Airport is a closed airport located at Milo, which was the first airport to serve the Sicilian city of Trapani, in Italy. Today it is used by the Italian Space Agency.

== History ==
The airport was built during the 1930s and became the base of the Italian Regia Aeronautica. After being heavily bombed by Allied forces during the Invasion of Sicily (Operation Husky) in July 1943, it stayed open until 1949 when the new Trapani–Chinisia Airfield was opened.

From 1975 the airport was used by the Italian Space Agency as the launch site for stratospheric balloons. It was one of the few in the world able to launch balloons across the Mediterranean (to Spain) and across the Atlantic, which was fundamental for astrophysics and astronomy research. The launch base in July 2001 was named after Italian aerospace engineer Luigi Broglio. More recently, it was used for launching unmanned aircraft. It was closed in 2010.

In 1976 with the construction of the motorway A29 the runway was cut in half and a small road bridge connects the two parts of the runway.

== See also ==
- Trapani–Birgi Airport
- Trapani–Chinisia Airfield
- List of airports in Sicily
