= Brindisi Airport =

Brindisi Airport Aeroporto di Brindisi

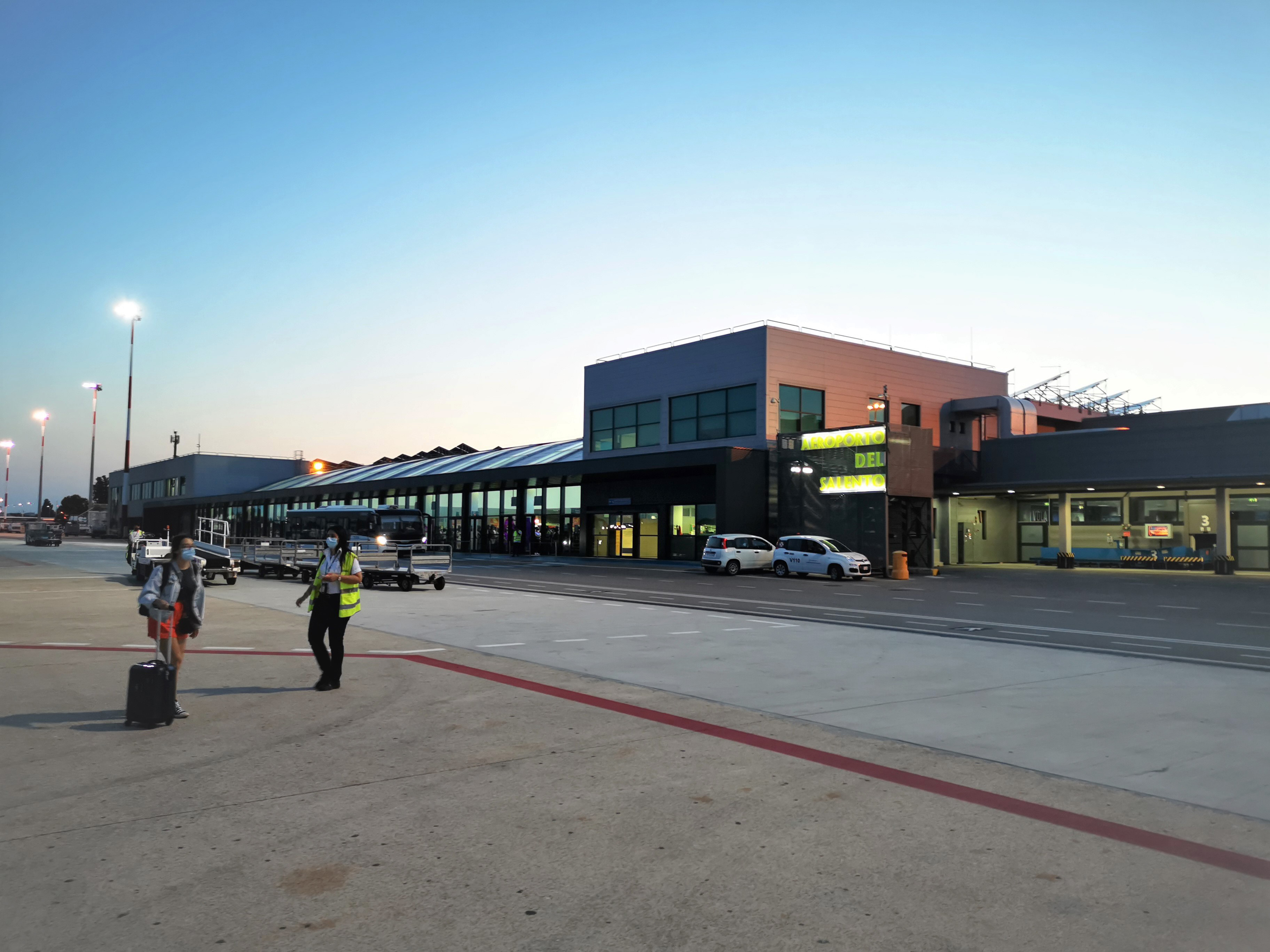
- IATA: BDS; ICAO: LIBR

Summary
- Airport type: Public
- Serves: Brindisi, Italy
- Focus city for: Ryanair
- Elevation AMSL: 47 ft (14 m)
- Coordinates: 40°39′27″N 17°56′49″E
- Website: aeroportidipuglia.it

Map
- Location of the airport in Italy BDS (Italy)

Runways
Direction	Length		Surface
Direction	ft	m	Surface
05/23	5,892	1,796	Asphalt
13/31	10,000	3,048	Asphalt

Statistics (2024)
- Passengers: 3,385,610
- Passenger change 23-24: ▲6.6%
- Aircraft movements: 25,212
- Movements change 23-24: ▲3.6%
- Cargo (tons): 224
- Cargo change 23-24: ▼ -50%
- Statistics from Assaeroporti

Brindisi Airport (IATA: BDS, ICAO: LIBR) (Italian: Aeroporto di Brindisi), also known as Brindisi Papola Casale Airport and Salento Airport, is an airport in Brindisi, in southern Italy, located 6 kilometres (3.7 mi) from the city centre.

== History ==
=== Foundation and early years ===
Interior of the departures hall

This airport was originally established as a military airbase in the 1920s. The first commercial flights serving Rome began in the 1930s with the establishment of Ala Littoria Airlines in 1934. After World War II, Alitalia took over the route and added a flight to Catania.

The airport is officially named after Antonio Papola, in memory of the Italian aviator who died on 13 February 1948 in an air accident who had a special bond with the city. It is also officially known as "Casale" with reference to the contiguous neighborhood in Brindisi with the same name and also as "Salento Airport" with reference to the geographic region where it is located.

As of 2008, it has officially changed its legal status into civilian airport, still maintaining operational the military facilities attached to it. These are identified with its original name "Military Airport Orazio Pierozzi", named in memory of an Italian airman of the First World War.

=== Military usage ===
The strategic position of the airport in the Mediterranean region, along with its multi-modal connections with the highway and the port a few kilometers away, have made it a base of crucial importance for both national defense and NATO. For the same strategic reasons, in 1994 the airport was chosen as the main global logistics base by the United Nations to support its peacekeeping and peace enforcement operations around the world, which was previously hosted in Pisa Military Airport "San Giusto".

In 2000, the United Nations humanitarian supply depot was also moved from Pisa to Brindisi. It has since then been managed by the World Food Programme and officially known as the United Nations Humanitarian Response Depot (UNHRD). On behalf of governments, other UN agencies and NGOs, from UNHRD Brindisi humanitarian aid is directed to the most remote and devastated regions around the world.

== Airlines and destinations ==
The following airlines operate regular scheduled and charter flights at Brindisi Airport:

Airlines	Destinations
Aer Lingus	Seasonal: Dublin
Air Dolomiti	Seasonal: Munich
British Airways	Seasonal: London–Heathrow
Brussels Airlines	Seasonal: Brussels
DAT	Seasonal: Catania
Discover Airlines	Seasonal: Frankfurt
easyJet	Basel/Mulhouse, Geneva, Milan–Malpensa; Seasonal: London–Gatwick, Lyon, Milan–Linate, Paris–Orly
Eurowings	Stuttgart; Seasonal: Cologne/Bonn, Düsseldorf, Prague
FlyOne	Tivat
ITA Airways	Milan–Linate, Rome–Fiumicino
Luxair	Seasonal: Luxembourg
Neos	Seasonal: Milan–Malpensa, Verona
Ryanair	Bologna, Brussels Charleroi, Eindhoven, Gdańsk, London–Stansted, Manchester, Milan Bergamo, Milan–Malpensa, Paris-Beauvais, Perugia, Pisa, Rome–Fiumicino, Trieste, Turin, Verona; Seasonal: Dublin, Genoa, Klagenfurt (begins 29 March 2027), Madrid, Memmingen, Palermo, Stockholm–Arlanda, Venice, Wrocław Warsaw–Modlin (begins 28 March 2027),
SkyAlps	Seasonal: Bolzano
Smartwings	Seasonal: Prague
Swiss International Air Lines	Zürich
Transavia	Seasonal: Paris–Orly, Rotterdam/The Hague
TUI fly Belgium	Seasonal: Brussels, Lamezia Terme
TUI fly Netherlands	Seasonal: Amsterdam
Volotea	Seasonal: Nantes
Wizz Air	Bucharest–Otopeni, Warsaw–Modlin; Seasonal: Katowice

== Transport ==
Cotrap buses provide public transport connections between the airport and the city centre.

== See also ==
- Port of Brindisi
- List of airports in Italy
- Bari Airport
