= LICD =

LICD may refer to:

- Least I Could Do, a humor webcomic by Ryan Sohmer and Lar deSouza
- LICD, the ICAO code for Lampedusa Airport, Linosa, Italy
