= Livio Bassi =

Italian aviator

Livio Bassi (8 October 1918 – 2 April 1941) was an Italian aviator, and a fighter ace of World War II.

== Early life ==
Bassi was born in Trapani, Sicily, in 1918, was a cadet of the prestigious Nunziatella military academy between 1932 and 1935, and entered the Italian Accademia Aeronautica (Air Force Academy) in 1936. In 1939, he was made Sottotenente (2nd Lieutenant) of Regia Aeronautica and was assigned to the 395th Squadron (160th Fighter Wing).

== Second World War ==
In 1940, he was promoted to full Lieutenant.

In this unit, with Fiat G.50, he took part in his first military mission, on November 4, 1940, in Jannina (Greece). In December 1940 and January 1941 destroyed four enemy planes in combat.

On 20 February 1941 Pat Pattle, a flying ace of the Royal Air Force, flying Hurricane Mk I V7724, was leading a group of six Hurricanes escorting 16 Blenheim light bombers — eight of No. 84 Squadron RAF, six of No. 211 Squadron and three of No. 30 Squadron RAF — to Berat. Fiat G.50bis from the 361^{a} and 395^{a} Squadriglia, 154° Autonomo Gruppo were scrambled from Berat airfield, but they were attacked by the higher altitude Hurricanes. Pattle led his section straight towards four Fiat G.50s and selected the leading aircraft as his own target. It was the first time he had fired the eight guns of the Hurricane, and the G.50 exploded. The Fiat G.50 was from 154° Gruppo, and it was the first Hurricane victory that Pattle would claim. The plane of Bassi was hit in this battle, after knocking down two British planes.

He could land even with the damaged plane, but the aircraft caught fire. Bassi died a few weeks after at the military hospital in Rome. A Gold Medal of Military Valor awarded posthumously.

== Memorials ==
The Airport Trapani-Chinisia was named in 1949 after Livio Bassi, and was later named the military Trapani–Birgi Airport.

== Bibliography ==
- Baker, E.C.R. Ace of Aces: The Story of Squadron Leader Pat Pattle, greatest fighter ace of the R.A.F. London: William Kimber, 1965. ISBN 978-0-450-02726-0
- Shores, Christopher, Brian Cull and Maria Malizia. Air War for Yugoslavia, Greece and Crete: 1940–41. London: Grub Street, 1992. ISBN 0-948817-07-0.
- Thomas, Andrew. Hurricane Aces 1941–45. Oxford: Osprey, 2003. ISBN 978-1841766102
- Chris Dunning, Combat Units of the Regia Aeronautica. Italia Air Force 1940-1943, Oxford University Press, 1988 ISBN 1-871187-01-X

== See also ==
- List of World War II flying aces
