= Venice Marco Polo Airport =

International airport serving Venice, Italy

Venice Marco Polo Airport Aeroporto di Venezia Marco Polo/Aeroporto di Venezia-Tessera

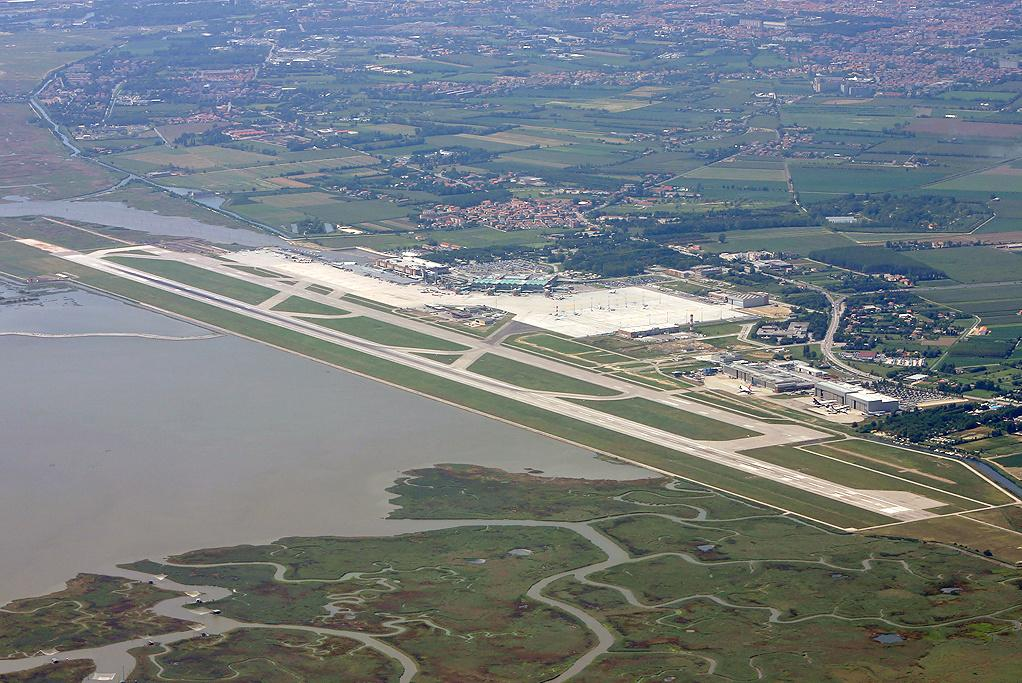
- IATA: VCE; ICAO: LIPZ

Summary
- Airport type: Public
- Owner/Operator: SAVE S.p.A.
- Serves: Venice and Padua, Italy
- Location: Tessera
- Focus city for: easyJet; Ryanair; Volotea; Wizz Air
- Elevation AMSL: 7 ft (2.1 m)
- Coordinates: 45°30′19″N 012°21′07″E
- Website: Official website

Map
- Location of the airport in Italy VCE (Italy) VCE (Europe)

Runways
Direction	Length		Surface
Direction	m	ft	Surface
04R/22L	3,300	10,827	Asphalt
04L/22R	2,780	9,121	Asphalt

Statistics (2025)
- Passengers: 11,850,336
- Passenger change 25-24: ▲2.2%
- Movements: 87,597
- Movements change 25-24: ▲ -1.4%
- Cargo (Metric tonnes): 61,950
- Cargo change 25-24: ▲0.6%
- Source: Assaeroporti

Venice Marco Polo Airport (IATA: VCE, ICAO: LIPZ) is the international airport of Venice, Italy. It is located on the mainland near the village of Tessera, a frazione of the comune of Venice located about 7.5 kilometres (4.7 miles) northeast of Venice city centre. Due to the importance of Venice as a leisure destination, it features flights to many European metropolitan areas as well as some partly seasonal long-haul routes to the United States, Canada, South Korea and the Middle East. The airport handled 11,184,608 passengers in 2018, making it the fourth-busiest airport in Italy. The airport is named after Marco Polo and serves as a base for Volotea, Ryanair, Wizz Air and easyJet.

Another airport located in the Venice area, Treviso Airport, is sometimes unofficially labelled Venice – Treviso and serves low-cost airlines Ryanair and Wizz Air.

== Overview ==
A modern terminal was opened in 2002. The airport is managed by SAVE S.p.A., a company partially owned by local authorities that also controls the smaller Treviso Airport, dedicated to low-cost carriers. The airport was named after the Venetian traveller Marco Polo.

== Terminal ==
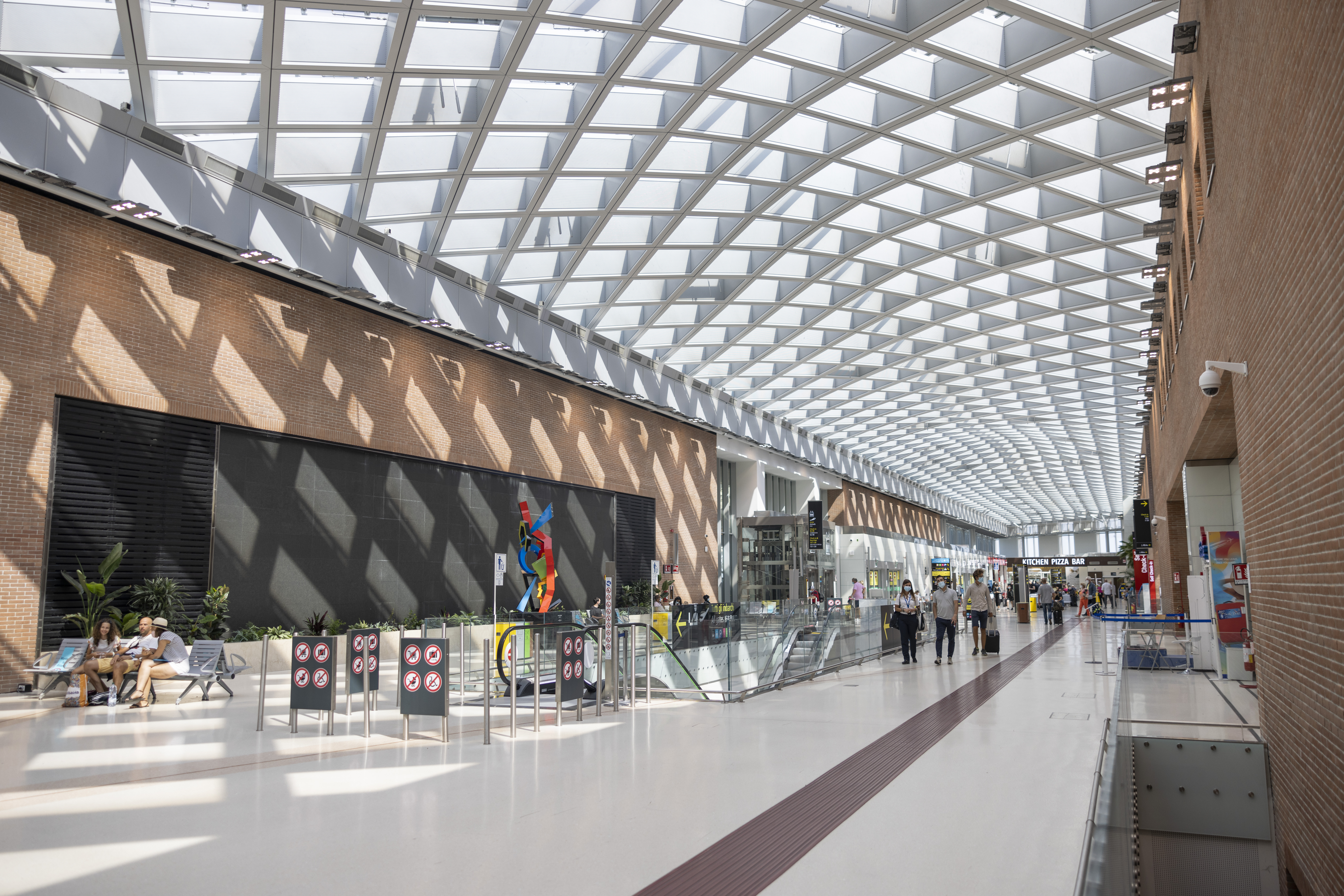
Terminal

The airport terminal has three floors: the ground floor for arrivals and the second floor for departures. The departure area has 70 check-in desks and has two airside lounges. The "Tintoretto Lounge" is for SkyTeam passengers and the "Marco Polo Room" is for all other passengers. The third floor of the terminal has offices for the operating company and airlines. The departure floor has separate areas for Schengen and non-Schengen flights.

== Airlines and destinations ==
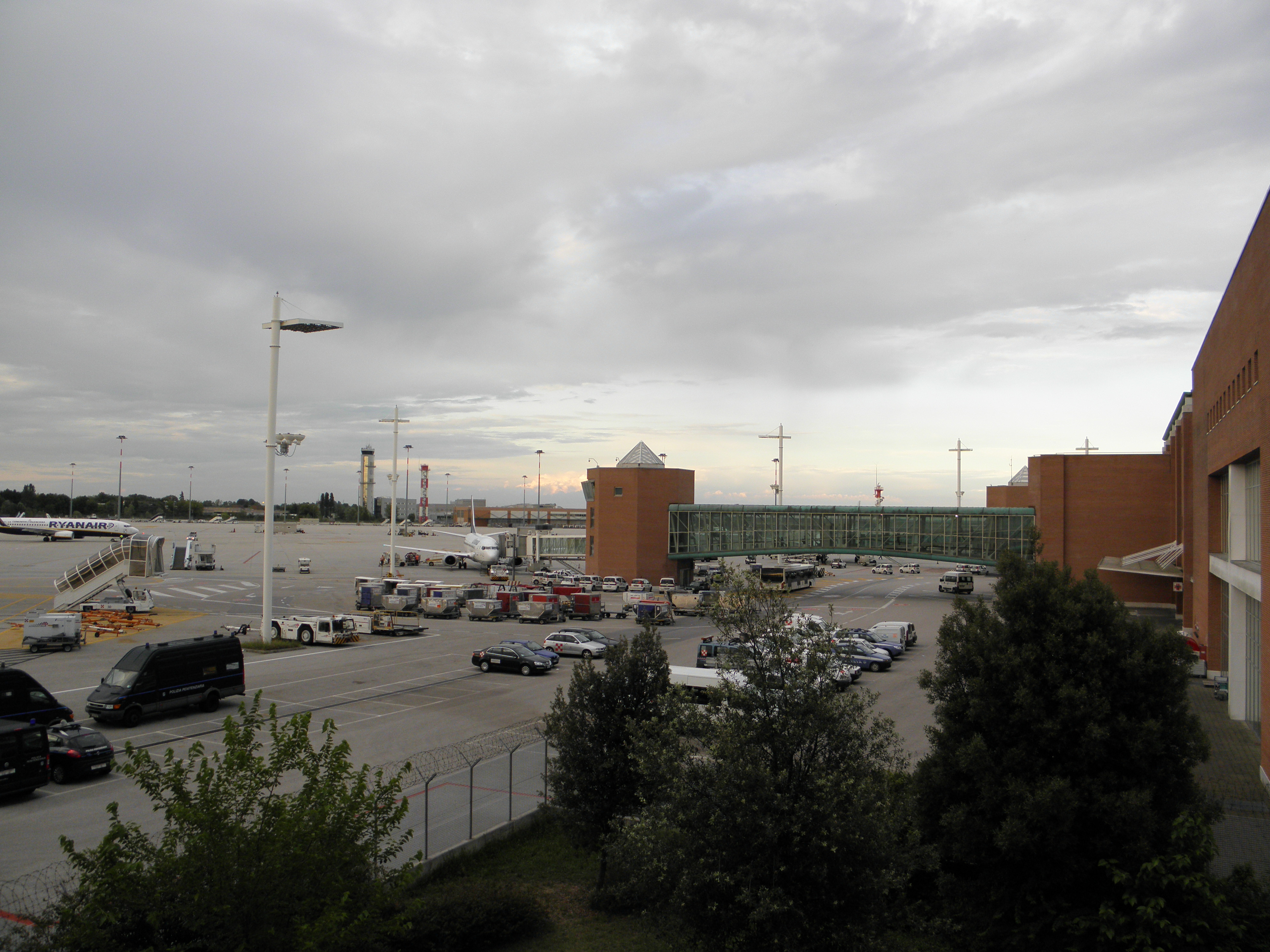
View of the apron

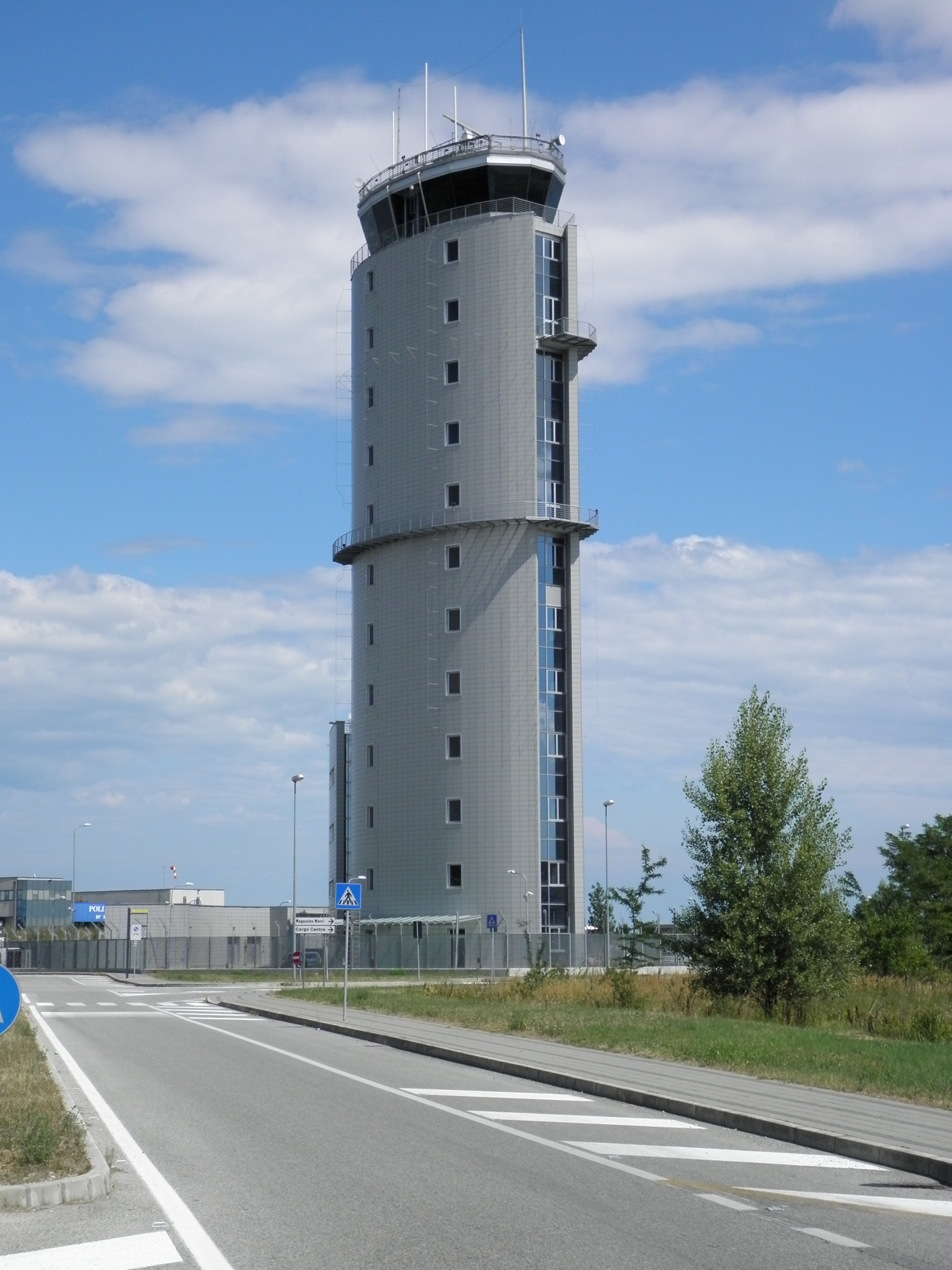
Air traffic control

The following airlines operate regular scheduled and charter flights to and from Venice:

Airlines	Destinations
Aegean Airlines	Athens
Aer Lingus	Seasonal: Dublin
Air Arabia	Casablanca
Air Cairo	Sharm El Sheikh
Air Canada	Seasonal: Montréal–Trudeau, Toronto–Pearson
Air China	Beijing–Capital
Air Dolomiti	Munich
Air Europa	Madrid
Air France	Paris–Charles de Gaulle
Air Serbia	Belgrade
Air Transat	Seasonal: Toronto–Pearson
airBaltic	Seasonal: Riga
American Airlines	Seasonal: Dallas/Fort Worth, Philadelphia
Austrian Airlines	Vienna
British Airways	London–Heathrow
Brussels Airlines	Brussels
China Eastern Airlines	Shanghai–Pudong
Condor	Frankfurt
Cyprus Airways	Seasonal: Larnaca
Delta Air Lines	New York–JFK; Seasonal: Atlanta, Boston (begins 7 May 2027)
easyJet	Amsterdam, Basel/Mulhouse, Berlin, Bristol, Geneva, London–Gatwick, Lyon, Manchester, Nice, Paris–Charles de Gaulle, Paris–Orly; Seasonal: Edinburgh
Egyptair	Cairo
El Al	Tel Aviv
Emirates	Dubai–International
Eurowings	Düsseldorf; Seasonal: Cologne/Bonn, Hamburg, Stuttgart
Finnair	Seasonal: Helsinki
HiSky	Chișinău
Icelandair	Seasonal: Reykjavík-Keflavík
Iberia	Madrid
ITA Airways	Rome–Fiumicino
Jet2.com	Seasonal: Birmingham, Manchester
Jettime	Helsinki
KLM	Amsterdam
LOT Polish Airlines	Warsaw–Chopin
Lufthansa	Frankfurt
Luxair	Luxembourg
Norwegian Air Shuttle	Seasonal: Copenhagen, Oslo, Stockholm–Arlanda
Pegasus Airlines	Istabul
Qatar Airways	Doha
Royal Air Maroc	Casablanca
Ryanair	Alicante, Athens, Barcelona, Bari, Berlin, Brindisi, Bristol, Budapest, Catania, Cork, Dublin, Edinburgh, Kraków, London–Luton, London–Stansted, Málaga, Manchester, Naples, Palermo, Reggio Calabria, Seville, Trapani; Seasonal: Alghero, Helsinki, Lamezia Terme, Madrid, Vienna
Saudia	Seasonal: Jeddah, Riyadh
Scandinavian Airlines	Copenhagen; Seasonal: Oslo
Smartwings	Prague
SunExpress	Seasonal: Izmir
Swiss International Air Lines	Zürich
TAP Air Portugal	Lisbon
Transavia	Paris-Orly
TUI fly Deutschland	Seasonal: Düsseldorf (begins 2 May 2027)
Tunisair	Tunis
Turkish Airlines	Istanbul
Twin Jet	Seasonal: Nice
United Airlines	Seasonal: Newark, Washington–Dulles
Volotea	Athens, Bilbao, Bordeaux, Corfu, Lyon, Marseille, Nantes, Naples, Toulouse Zakynthos; Seasonal: Asturias, Cagliari, Karpathos, Lampedusa, Murcia, Olbia, Pantelleria, Rhodes, Santorini, Skiathos
Vueling	Barcelona, Bilbao
Wizz Air	Alicante, Athens, Barcelona, Bilbao, Bordeaux, Budapest, Cagliari (begins 14 December 2026), Catania, Chișinău, Kraków, Kutaisi, Larnaca, London–Luton, Madrid, Málaga, Naples, Palermo, Seville, Sharm El Sheikh, Skopje, Tallinn, Tel Aviv, Tenerife–South, Valencia, Warsaw–Chopin, Yerevan; Seasonal: Alghero

== Ground transportation ==
The mainland airport has scheduled bus connections to the nearby railway stations of Venice Mestre and Piazzale Roma. The airport is also directly connected to several destinations in the lagoon by public transit Alilaguna water shuttle services (Blue, Red and Orange lines); by the express Gold Line to Piazza San Marco or by water taxi. From the airport it is possible to reach:

- Venice Piazzale Roma by ATVO (provincial company) buses and by ACTV (city company) buses (route 5 aerobus);
- Venice, Lido and Murano by Alilaguna (private company) motorboats;
- Mestre, the mainland and Venice Mestre railway station, providing connections to Milan, Padua, Trieste, Verona and the rest of Italy, by ACTV buses (route 15 and 45) and ATVO buses;
- regional destinations (Treviso, Padua, beaches ...) by ATVO buses and by Busitalia Sita Nord buses (national company).

A rail link which will connect the airport to Venice Mestre via the Venice–Trieste railway is currently under construction and is expected to be completed in late 2026, with trains circulating beginning in early 2027.

== Accidents and incidents ==
- On 6 March 1967, a Short Brothers SC.7 Skyvan 2–102, operated by Soc. Aeralpi, crashed while attempting to land in bad weather, crashing into the lagoon. All 3 on board survived.
- On 14 September 1993, an Italian Air Force Piaggio PD.808 crashed while attempting to land in bad weather, killing all 3 on board.
