= Verona Villafranca Airport =

Airport in Villafranca di Verona, Veneto, Italy

Verona Airport Aeroporto di Verona-Villafranca

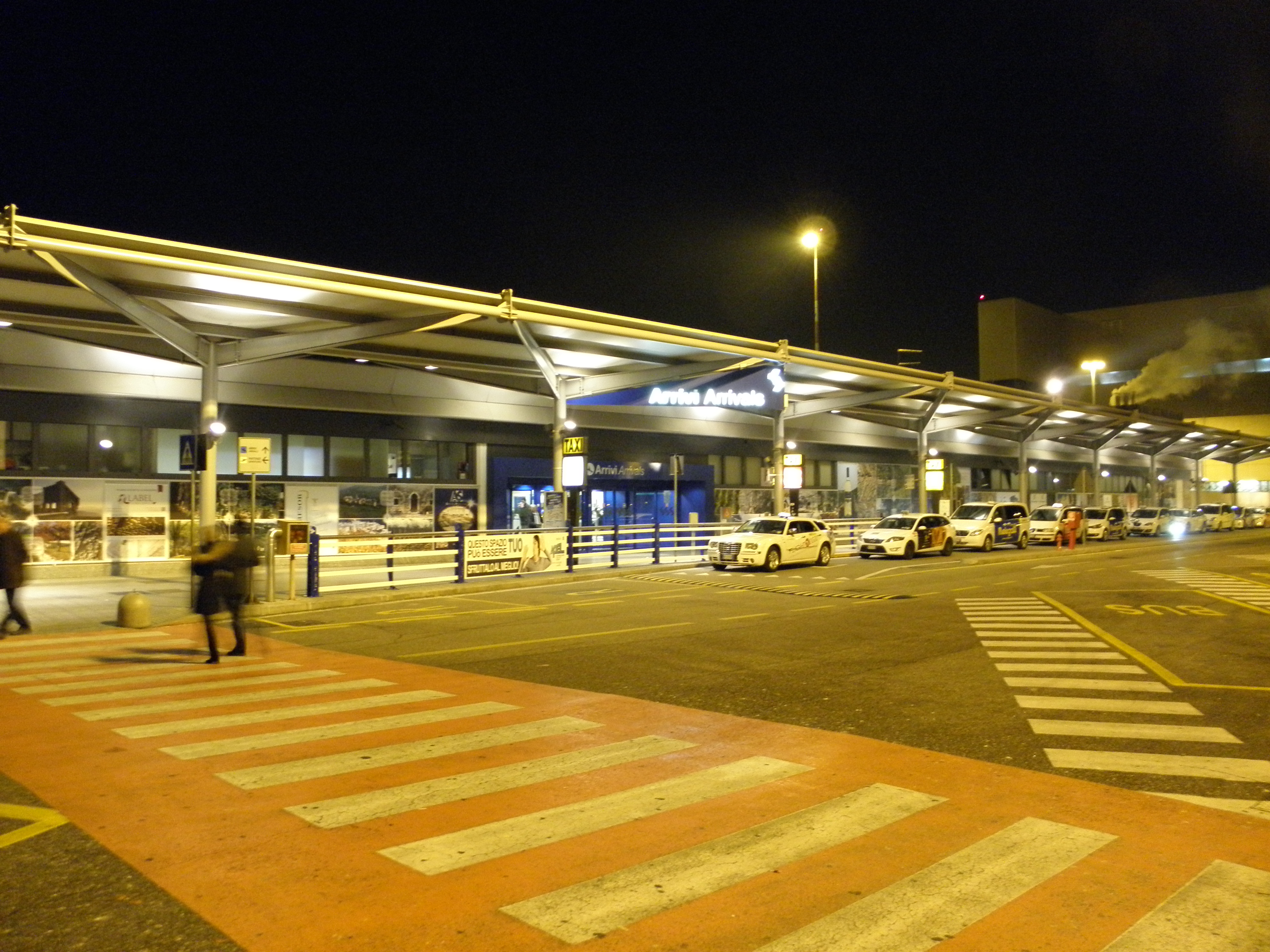
- IATA: VRN; ICAO: LIPX

Summary
- Airport type: Civil / military
- Operator: GardaAeroporti
- Serves: Verona, Italy
- Location: Villafranca di Verona, Veneto
- Focus city for: Air Dolomiti; Neos; Volotea
- Elevation AMSL: 240 ft (73 m)
- Coordinates: 45°23′47″N 010°53′17″E
- Website: aeroportoverona.it

Map
- Location of the airport in Italy VRN (Italy)

Runways
| Direction | Length | | Surface |
| Direction | m | ft | Surface |
|---|---|---|---|
| 04/22 | 3,068 | 10,064 | Asphalt |

Helipads
| Number | Length | | Surface |
| Number | m | ft | Surface |
|---|---|---|---|
| H1 | 35 × 26 | 110 × 85 | Concrete |

Statistics (2025)
- Passengers: 4.027.863
- Passenger change 24-25: ▲8,7%
- Movements: 30.784
- Movements change 24-25: ▲5.5%
- Cargo (tons): 855.9
- Cargo change 24-25: ▲4.9%
- Statistics from Assaeroporti

Verona Villafranca Airport (IATA: VRN, ICAO: LIPX), also known as Valerio Catullo Airport or Villafranca Airport, is located 10 km (6.2 mi) southwest of Verona, Italy. The airport is situated next to the junction of A4 Milan-Venice and A22 Modena-Brenner motorways. It serves a population of more than 4 million inhabitants in the provinces of Verona, Brescia, Mantua, Trentino, and South Tyrol.

== History ==
=== Early years ===
Established in 1916, the airport served primarily as an airbase for the Italian Royal Air Force during World War I and World War II. In 1961, it began its civil activity with the first charter flights as well as national ones.

In the late 1970s, under the first community project by the province of Verona, the Comune of Verona and the local Chamber of Commerce, Villafranca Airport constructed a passenger terminal, offices and handling facilities. The managing society, Aeroporto Valerio Catullo di Verona Villafranca S.P.A., was established in December 1978. Ownership is currently shared between the provincial governments of Veneto (Villafranca di Verona and Sommacampagna), Lombardy (Province of Brescia), Trentino (second main shareholder) and Alto Adige/Südtirol.

=== Expansion in the 1990s and 2000s ===
In 1990, the passenger terminal was expanded in order to cope with the constantly growing air traffic. The aircraft apron and car-parking areas were enlarged; in addition, access to the airport was improved by a road link to Verona's new ring road (SS12) in preparation for the 1990 FIFA World Cup.

In 1995, the airport reached a record of handling one million passengers per annum. In 1999, the airport became Italy's second-grade airport in the 'Special Classification of Charter Traffic' and ranked after Milan Malpensa Airport and Rome Fiumicino Airport.

During the Bosnian War, the airport was used by NATO aircraft as a staging area.

Passenger numbers continued to grow: 2 million per year in 2001 and 3 million per year in 2006. In response to the strong demand in patronage, the airport undertook a significant expansion programme on its services and facilities. In May 2006, a new arrivals terminal, Terminal 2, was opened by the Vice-Minister of Transport, Cesare De Piccoli, and vice-president of Veneto Region, Luca Zaia. This additional terminal is situated immediately next to the original building, now known as Terminal 1. As a result of the expansion programme, the airport's capacity doubled. Hence Terminal 1 is used solely for departures and Terminal 2 for arrivals.

=== 2010s ===
Air traffic continued to grow during the 2010s, with 3,385,794 passengers recorded in 2011. After a European Union investigation into high subsidies being granted to Ryanair on their scheduled routes, the airline pulled out of Villafranca Airport in 2012. This caused a reduction in passenger traffic in 2013.

In 2015, Ryanair reintroduced services to the airport with scheduled flights to Palermo, London Stansted and Brussels. Several airlines have switched their charter routes to regular services during the Winter Season 2015-16: Finnair flies between Verona and Helsinki and AirBaltic flies between Verona and Riga. The route between Paris and Verona, as operated by Air France, however, ceased operation in late October 2015, having been replaced with flights operated by its low-cost subsidiary, Transavia.

=== 2020s ===
As passenger numbers continued to increase, and predicted to reach 5 million in 2025, as well as the upcoming 2026 Winter Olympics in Milan, a new passenger terminal is under construction, costing 68 million euros. The new terminal will increase the number of security checkpoints by relocating them to a new, second floor. It will also increase the boarding area for both Schengen and Non-Schengen passengers, and adding 3 new boarding bridges. As of October 2024, the refurbishment is "80% complete".

== Facilities ==
Verona-Villafranca Airport is equipped with a fog-dispersal device, so that flight operations could continue during times of low visibility. This system has been in operation since 2003 and allows pilots to land in visibility as low as 75 m (246 ft). The runway is certified for ILS Category IIIb approach.

The two terminals, departures and arrivals, are situated next to each other. The departures' hall hosts check-in facilities at the eastern side. The lounge is located on the first floor's eastern wing. The main bus stand is located directly outside the arrivals' hall.

== Airlines and destinations ==
The following airlines operate regular scheduled and charter flights at Verona Villafranca Airport:

| Airlines | Destinations |
|---|---|
| Aer Lingus | Dublin; Seasonal charter: Belfast–City |
| Air Cairo | Seasonal: Cairo, Luxor |
| Air Dolomiti | Frankfurt, Munich |
| Air France | Seasonal: Paris–Charles de Gaulle |
| airBaltic | Seasonal: Riga |
| arkia | Seasonal: Tel Aviv |
| British Airways | London–Gatwick |
| easyJet | Bristol, London–Gatwick, Manchester |
| Eurowings | Seasonal: Cologne/Bonn, Düsseldorf, Hamburg; Seasonal charter: Copenhagen |
| Finnair | Seasonal: Helsinki |
| FlyOne | Chișinău |
| Icelandair | Reykjavik-Keflavik |
| Israir | Seasonal: Tel Aviv |
| ITA Airways | Rome–Fiumicino (resumes 28 March 2027) |
| Jet2.com | Manchester; Seasonal: Belfast–International, Birmingham, Bristol, East Midlands, Edinburgh, Glasgow, Leeds/Bradford, London–Gatwick, London–Luton, London–Stansted, Newcastle upon Tyne |
| Neos | Fuerteventura, La Romana, Marsa Alam, Sharm El Sheikh, Tel Aviv Paris Charles de Gaulle; Seasonal: Amritsar, Boa Vista, Cagliari, Cancún, Catania, Comiso, Dakar–Diass, Djerba, Enfidha, Espargos, Gran Canaria, Heraklion, Ibiza, Karpathos, Kos, Lamezia Terme, Madrid, Malé, Marsa Matruh, Menorca, Milan Malpensa, Mombasa, Monastir, Montego Bay, Mykonos, Olbia, Palma de Mallorca, Reykjavík–Keflavík, Rhodes, Rome, Santorini, Tenerife–South, Turin, Zanzibar |
| Norwegian Air Shuttle | Seasonal: Oslo |
| Royal Air Maroc | Seasonal: Casablanca |
| Ryanair | Bari, Birmingham, Brindisi, Brussels Charleroi, Cagliari, Catania, Dublin, Lamezia Terme, London–Stansted, Madrid, Manchester, Naples, Palermo, Tirana, Valencia; Seasonal: Corfu, Palma de Mallorca, Porto, Trapani |
| Sky Alps | Seasonal: Brač, Mostar, Zadar |
| Sundor | Seasonal: Tel Aviv |
| Transavia | Seasonal: Amsterdam |
| TUI Airways | Seasonal: Birmingham, Bristol, Glasgow, London–Gatwick, London–Stansted, Manchester, Newcastle upon Tyne |
| Volotea | Cagliari, Catania, Comiso, Madrid, Olbia, Palermo, Paris–Orly, Seville; Seasonal: Aalborg, Alghero, Athens Barcelona, Bilbao, Heraklion, Karpathos Lampedusa, Málaga, Menorca, Pantelleria, Prague, Zakynthos |
| Wizz Air | Catania, Chișinău, Kraków, Tirana; Seasonal: Gdańsk, Poznań |

== Statistics ==
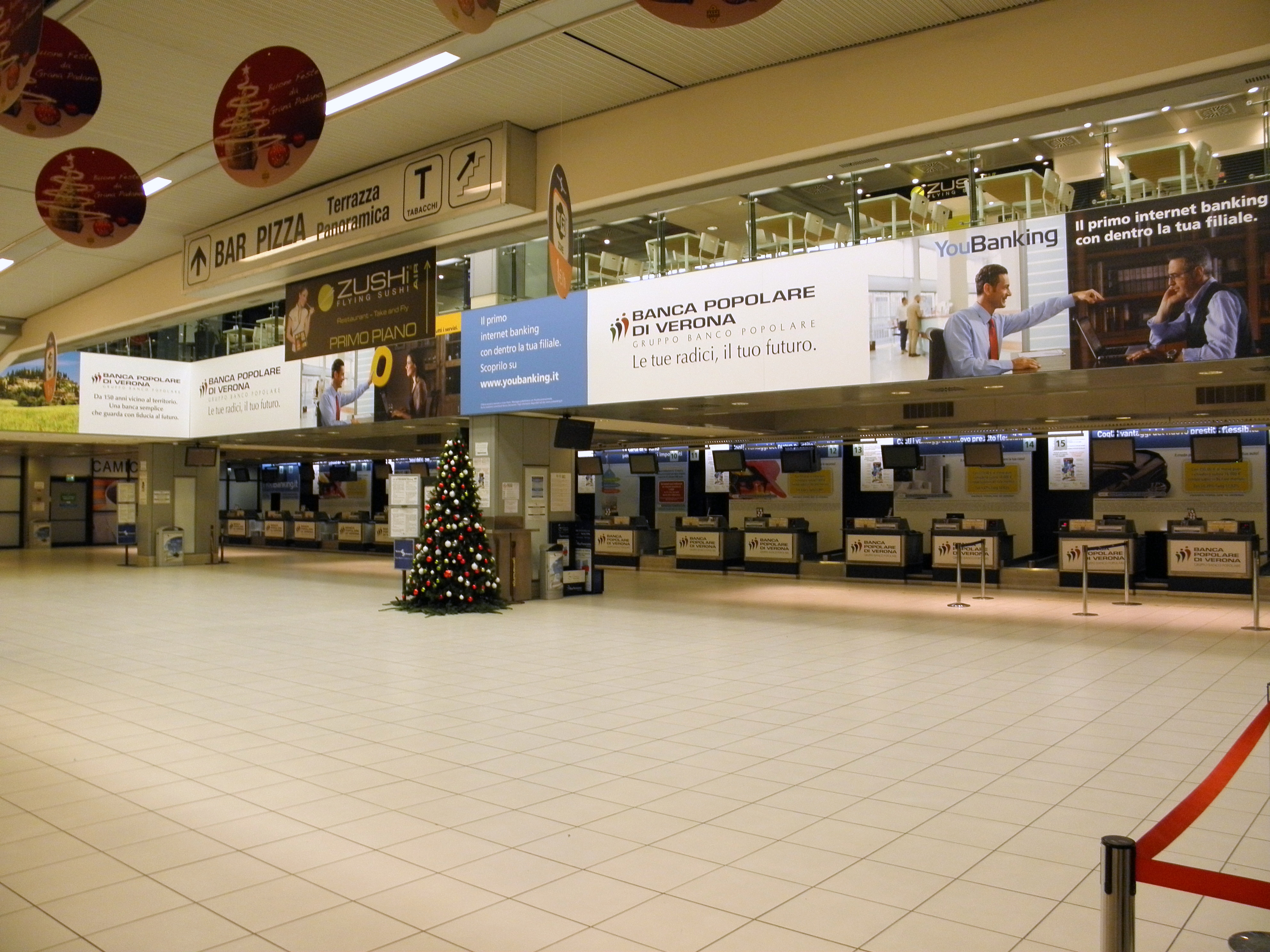
Check-in area

| Year | Passengers |
|---|---|
| 2000 | 2,293,799 |
| 2001 | 2,188,068 |
| 2002 | 2,185,785 |
| 2003 | 2,452,723 |
| 2004 | 2,687,565 |
| 2005 | 2,649,655 |
| 2006 | 3,007,965 |
| 2007 | 3,510,259 |
| 2008 | 3,402,601 |
| 2009 | 3,065,968 |
| 2010 | 3,022,784 |
| 2011 | 3,385,794 |
| 2012 | 3,198,788 |
| 2013 | 2,719,815 |
| 2014 | 2,775,616 |
| 2015 | 2,591,255 |
| 2016 | 2,807,811 |
| 2017 | 3,099,142 |
| 2018 | 3,453,404 |
| 2019 | 3,638,088 |
| 2020 | 1,040,555 |
| 2021 | 1,458,738 |
| 2022 | 2,982,060 |
| 2023 | 3,436,843 |
| 2024 | 3,704,582 |
| 2025 | 4,027,863 |

== Ground transportation ==
A shuttle bus service, Aerobus (199) operated by ATV, connects Verona-Villafranca Airport directly with Verona Porta Nuova station. During the summer months (June to September), ATV (Verona) buses 164, 183 and 184 additionally provide hourly connections between Verona-Villafranca Airport en route to comunes along Lake Garda/Lago di Garda.

== Incidents and accidents ==
On 13 December 1995, Banat Air Flight 166, an Antonov An-24 (YR-AMR), operated by Romavia for Banat Air, crashed into the ground shortly after takeoff from Verona Airport due to a stall. The reason was that the machine had not been de-iced despite snowfall. In addition, it was overloaded by at least two tons. All 49 people on board were killed.
