= Cagliari Elmas Airport =

Airport in Sardinia, Italy

Cagliari Elmas Airport Internazionale "Mario Mameli"

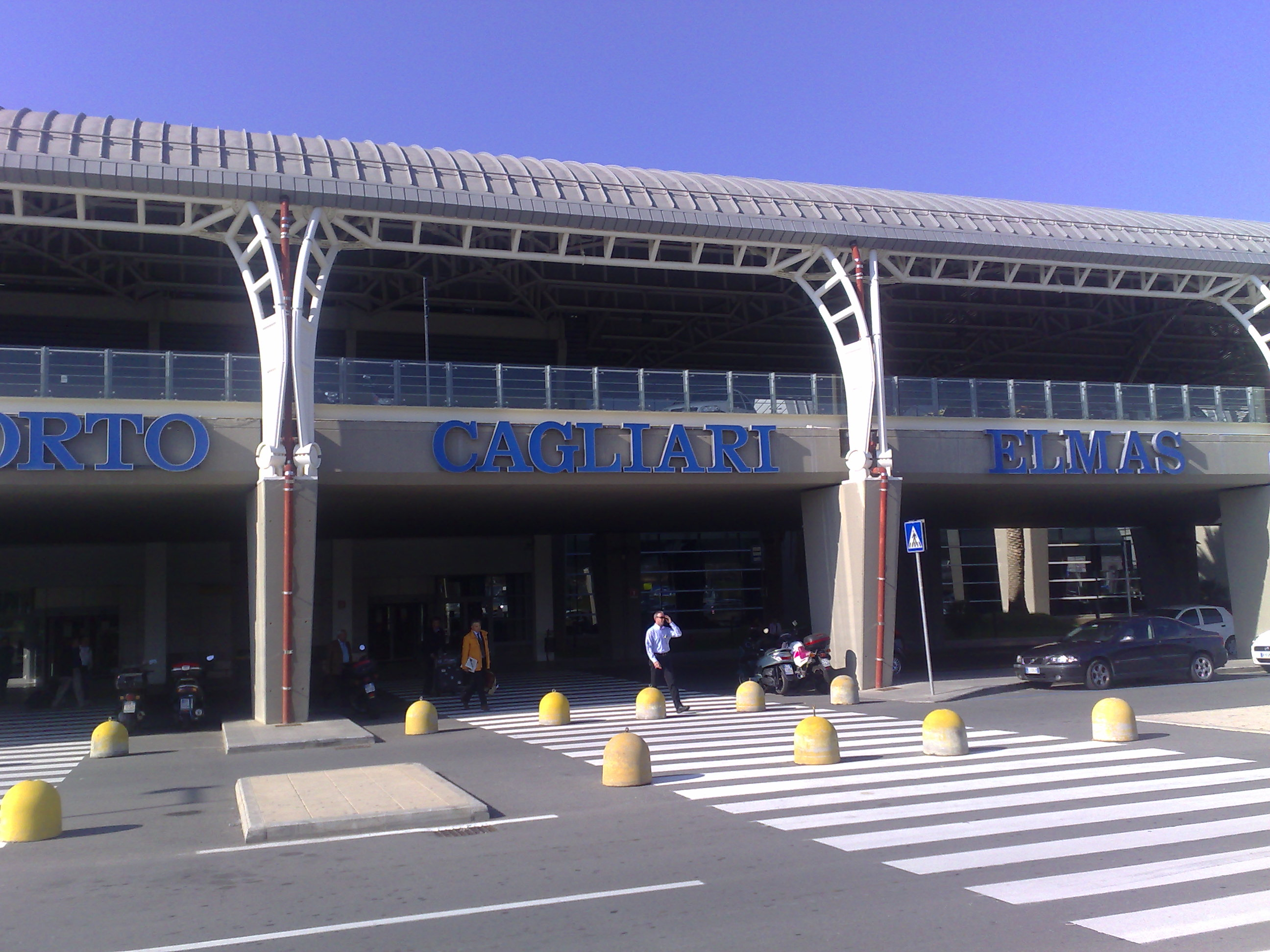
- IATA: CAG; ICAO: LIEE

Summary
- Airport type: Military/Public
- Operator: So.G.Aer. S.p.A.
- Serves: Cagliari, Sardinia
- Focus city for: Ryanair
- Elevation AMSL: 13 ft (4.0 m)
- Coordinates: 39°15′05.29″N 09°03′15.42″E
- Website: Official website

Map
- Location of the airport in Sardinia CAG (Italy)

Runways
Direction	Length		Surface
Direction	m	ft	Surface
14/32	2,804	9,199	Asphalt

Statistics (2025)
- Passengers: 5,254,433
- Passenger change 24-25: ▲1.8%
- Aircraft movements: 40,752
- Movements change 24-25: ▲2.0%
- Statistics from Assaeroporti

Cagliari Elmas Airport (IATA: CAG, ICAO: LIEE) is an international airport located in the territory of Elmas, near Cagliari, on the Italian island of Sardinia.

== History ==
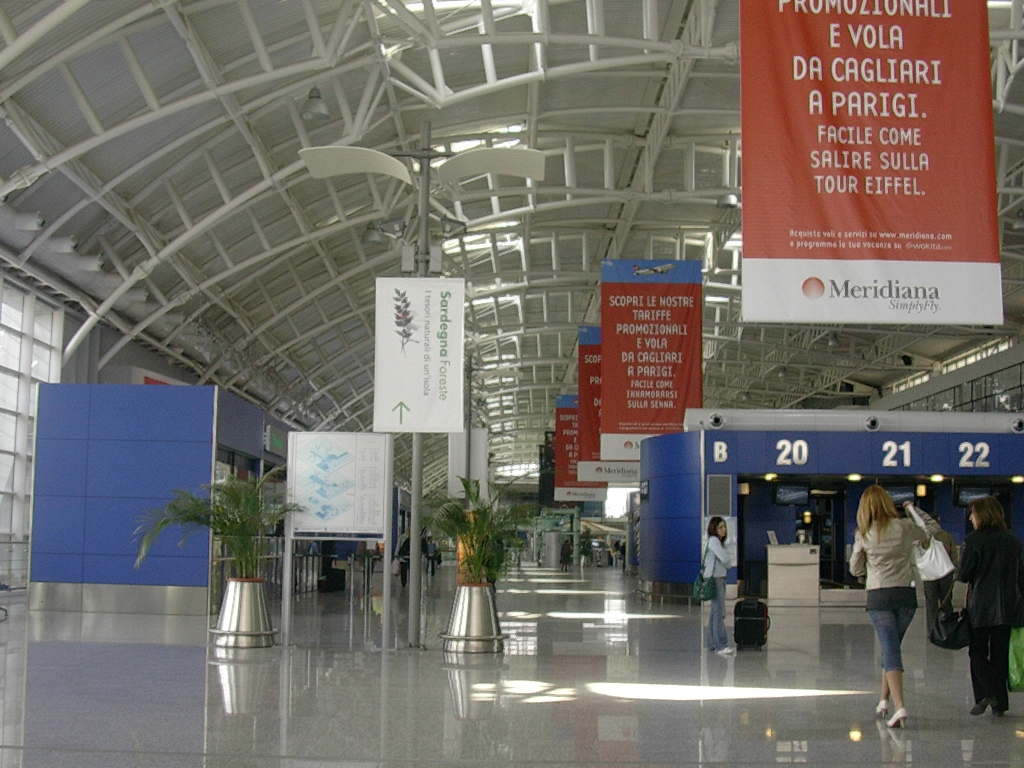
Check-in hall

The airport opened on 3 May 1937. It was named in 1937 after Mario Mameli, a bomber pilot from the fascist-era Italian airforce shot down in the Second Italo-Ethiopian War. The airport was upgraded in 2003 and the terminal was expanded and provided with 6 jetbridges for passenger boarding, with a capacity of 4 million passengers per year. In 2018, the airport handled 4,370,014 passengers.

== Airlines and destinations ==
The following airlines operate regular scheduled and charter flights at Cagliari Elmas Airport:

Airlines	Destinations
Aeroitalia	Cuneo, Milan–Linate, Rome–Fiumicino; Seasonal: Alghero, Bologna, Catania, Florence, Lamezia Terme, Olbia, Pisa
Air France	Seasonal: Paris–Charles de Gaulle
AlbaStar	Seasonal: Milan-Bergamo
Austrian Airlines	Seasonal: Vienna
British Airways	Seasonal: London–Gatwick
easyJet	Basel/Mulhouse, Geneva, Milan–Malpensa, Paris–Orly; Seasonal: Bordeaux, London–Gatwick (from 1 June 2027), Lyon, Naples, Nice
Edelweiss Air	Seasonal: Zürich
Eurowings	Seasonal: Düsseldorf, Hamburg, Salzburg, Stuttgart
Iberia	Seasonal: Madrid
KLM	Seasonal: Amsterdam
Lufthansa	Seasonal: Frankfurt, Munich
Luxair	Seasonal: Luxembourg
Luxwing	Seasonal charter: Aosta
Marathon Airlines	Seasonal charter: Innsbruck
Neos	Seasonal: Bologna, Milan–Malpensa, Verona
Ryanair	Bari, Bologna, Budapest, Catania, Brussels-Charleroi, Cuneo, Genoa, Kraków, London–Stansted, Malta, Milan–Malpensa, Naples, Nuremberg, Palermo, Paris-Beauvais, Parma, Pisa, Porto, Rimini, Rome–Ciampino, Seville, Stockholm–Arlanda, Turin, Valencia, Venice, Verona; Seasonal: Carcassonne, Dublin, Forlì, Gothenburg, Frankfurt-Hahn, Karlsruhe/Baden-Baden, Madrid, Palma de Mallorca, Milan-Bergamo, Perugia, Pescara, Poznań, Trieste, Vienna, Weeze
Scandinavian Airlines	Seasonal: Copenhagen
SkyAlps	Seasonal: Bolzano
Smartwings	Seasonal: Prague
Sundor	Seasonal: Tel Aviv
Transavia	Seasonal: Paris–Orly
Volotea	Florence, Marseille, Venice, Verona
Vueling	Barcelona
Wizz Air	Milan–Malpensa (begins 14 December 2026), Venice (begins 14 December 2026)

== Ground transportation ==
The airport is about 7 kilometres (4.3 mi) from Cagliari city centre. A railway station serving the airport enables connections to most Sardinian towns.

== Accidents and incidents ==
- On September 14, 1979, Aero Trasporti Italiani Flight 12, a DC-9-32 crashed in the mountains near Cagliari, Italy while approaching Cagliari-Elmas Airport. All 27 passengers and 4 crew members died in the crash and ensuing fire.
