= Milo, Trapani =

Coordinates: 38.0100°N 12.5800°E

Milo
- Frazione
- Location of Milo in Italy
- Country: Italy
- Region: Sicily
- Province: Province of Trapani
- Comune: Trapani
- Elevation: 12 m (39 ft)
- Time zone: UTC+1 (CET)
  - Summer (DST): UTC+2 (CEST)
- Postal code: 91016
- Dialing code: 0923
- Patron saint: Albert of Trapani

Milo is a frazione of Trapani, located 4 km southeast of Trapani city on the slopes of Monte Erice on the west coast of Sicily in Italy.

== History ==
Milo was the site of an important airport during the Second World War, called the Trapani–Milo Airport, which was used to transport people and supplies, for protecting convoys and as an airbase.

The area around the old military airport covers an area of over 90 hectares on the edge of the town and is home to the Italian Space Agency's Base di lancio palloni stratosferici (Launch base for stratospheric balloons), which was established in 1975 and renamed in honour of Luigi Broglio in July 2001. It is one of the view sites in the world capable of making transmeditteranean and transatlantic balloon launches, which are of fundamental importance for astrophysics and astronomical research. However, it has not been used for the latter type of launch since 1977. It has also been used recently for launching drones.
