= Palermo Airport =

International airport in Cinisi, Sicily, Italy

Falcone Borsellino Airport Aeroporto Falcone Borsellino
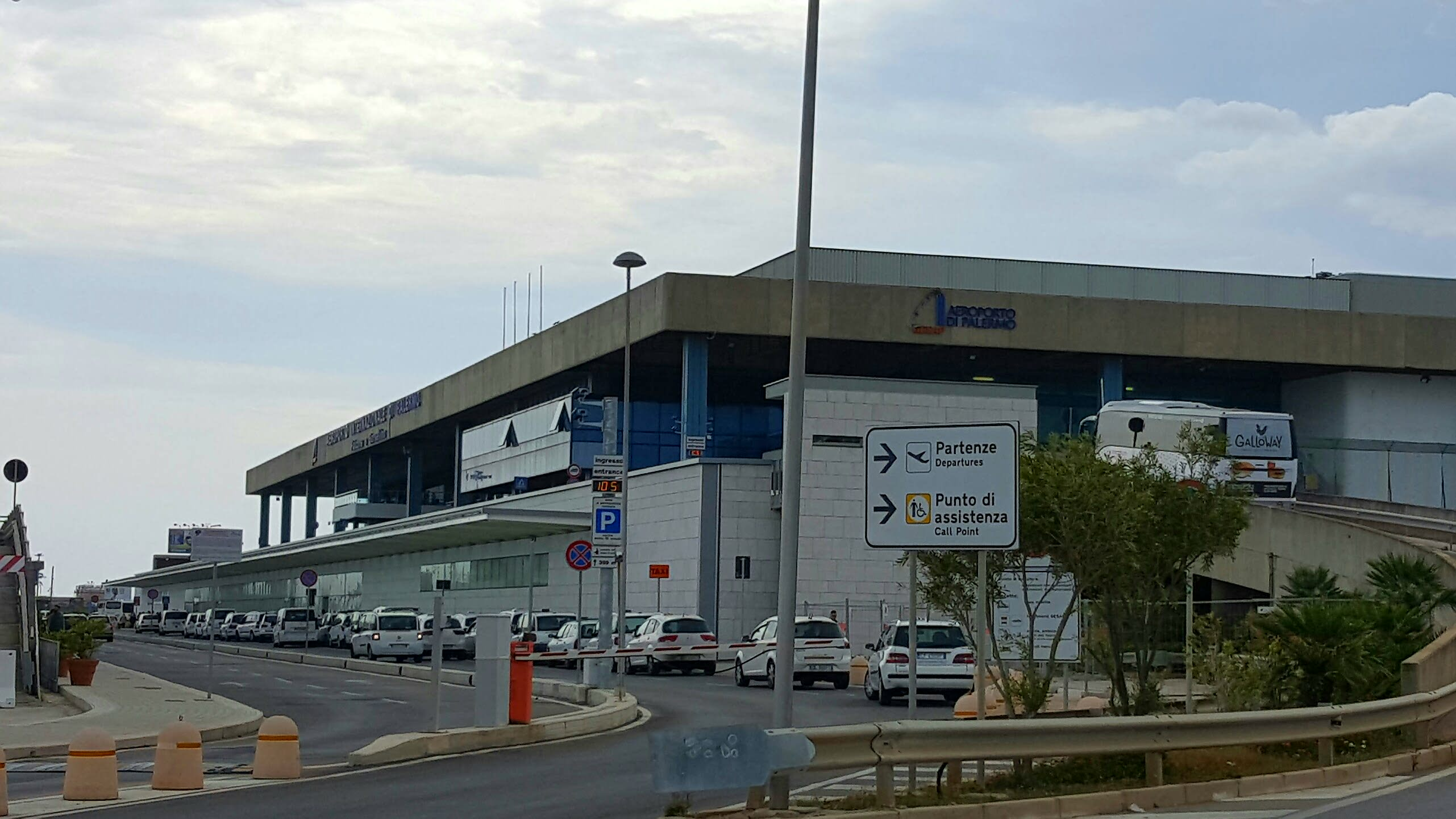
- IATA: PMO; ICAO: LICJ

Summary
- Airport type: Public
- Operator: Government
- Serves: Palermo, Italy
- Location: Cinisi, Palermo, Italy
- Opened: 1960
- Focus city for: Aeroitalia; Ryanair; Volotea; Wizz Air
- Elevation AMSL: 65 ft (20 m)
- Coordinates: 38°10′55″N 013°05′58″E
- Website: gesap.it

Map
- Location in Italy PMO (Italy)

Runways
| Direction | Length | | Surface |
| Direction | m | ft | Surface |
|---|---|---|---|
| 07/25 | 3,326 | 10,912 | Bitumen |
| 02/20 | 2,068 | 6,784 | Bitumen |

Statistics (2025)
- Passengers: 9,220,905
- Passenger change 24–25: ▲3.4%
- Movements: 64,841
- Movements change 24–25: ▼ -0.4%
- Cargo (tons): 1,534
- Cargo change 24–25: ▲6.2%
- Source: Italian AIP at EUROCONTROL; Statistics from Assaeroporti

Falcone Borsellino Airport (IATA: PMO, ICAO: LICJ) (Italian: Aeroporto Falcone Borsellino) or simply Palermo Airport, formerly Punta Raisi Airport, is an international airport located at Cinisi, 19 NM (35 km; 22 mi) west-northwest of Palermo, the capital city of the Italian island of Sicily. It is the second biggest airport in Sicily in terms of passengers after Catania-Fontanarossa Airport, with 9,220,905 passengers handled in 2025.

== History ==
The airport was opened in 1960 under the name Punta Raisi Airport (Aeroporto di Punta Raisi) due to its location on the cape of the same name. The new complex was built to replace the old Boccadifalco airport, which proved incapable of accommodating modern jet aircraft due to a short runway and mountainous surroundings that made flights unsafe.

It was given the name Falcone Borsellino in memory of the two leading anti-mafia judges Giovanni Falcone and Paolo Borsellino who were murdered by the Sicilian Mafia in 1992. A 1.90-metre-diameter (6.2 ft) plaque featuring their portraits can be found to the right of one of the main outside entrances to the departure hall, set into a mosaic of Sicily. Created by the Sicilian sculptor Tommaso Geraci, it bears the inscription Giovanni Falcone–Paolo Borsellino–Gli Altri–L'orgoglio della Nuova Sicilia (Giovanni Falcone–Paolo Borsellino–The Others–The Pride of the New Sicily).

In 1994, GESAP was charged with the partial management of the airport through a convention that granted the company a 20-year mandate to run land-side activities (the airport buildings and surrounding areas). In April 1999, GESAP obtained an anticipated mandate to manage the airport's air-side activities, and, more specifically, the flight infrastructure (runways, links, taxiways and aprons).

In June 2005, Eurofly launched seasonal flights from Palermo to New York City using Airbus A330s. The company merged with Meridiana in 2010 to create Meridiana Fly, which continued the service. As a result of Meridiana Fly's decision to rebrand as Air Italy, the route ended in October 2017. Neos commenced a summer-seasonal route in June 2024 with Boeing 787 Dreamliners, reconnecting Palermo to New York–JFK. In May 2025 United Airlines also commenced a new summer-seasonal service between the two cities, connecting the Sicilian city to Newark, near New York, using Boeing 767-400s.

== Management ==
GESAP S.p.a. is the airport management company of the airport. It has a fully paid-up share capital of €15,912,332 divided between the Regional Province of Palermo, the Comune of Palermo, the Chamber of Commerce, the Comune of Cinisi and other minor partners.

== Airlines and destinations ==
The following airlines operate regular scheduled and charter flights at Palermo Airport:

| Airlines | Destinations |
|---|---|
| Aegean Airlines | Seasonal: Athens |
| Aeroitalia | Rome–Fiumicino |
| Air France | Seasonal: Paris–Charles de Gaulle |
| Air Serbia | Seasonal: Belgrade |
| British Airways | London–Heathrow |
| DAT | Lampedusa, Pantelleria |
| easyJet | Amsterdam, Basel/Mulhouse, Milan–Malpensa, Naples; Seasonal: Bordeaux, Bristol, Geneva, Lisbon, London–Gatwick, London–Luton, Lyon, Nice, Palma de Mallorca, Paris–Orly, Porto |
| Egyptair | Seasonal charter: Sharm El Sheikh |
| Enter Air | Paris-Charles de Gaulle; Seasonal: Olbia, Nantes, Wrocław |
| Eurowings | Seasonal: Cologne/Bonn, Düsseldorf, Stuttgart |
| Iberia | Seasonal: Madrid |
| ITA Airways | Milan–Linate, Rome–Fiumicino |
| Jet2.com | Seasonal: Birmingham, Manchester, Newcastle upon Tyne |
| KM Malta Airlines | Seasonal: Malta |
| LOT Polish Airlines | Seasonal charter: Warsaw–Chopin |
| Lufthansa | Frankfurt, Munich |
| Luxair | Seasonal: Luxembourg |
| Luxwing | Seasonal charter: Aosta |
| Norwegian Air Shuttle | Seasonal: Copenhagen, Oslo, Stockholm–Arlanda |
| Ryanair | Barcelona, Bari, Beauvais, Bergamo, Berlin, Bologna, Bratislava, Budapest, Cagliari, Charleroi, Cologne/Bonn, Forlì, Genoa, Hahn, Kraków, London–Stansted, Madrid, Marseille, Memmingen, Milan–Malpensa, Naples, Nuremberg, Perugia, Pisa, Prague, Poznań, Rome–Fiumicino, Sofia, Tirana, Trieste, Turin, Valencia, Venice, Verona, Warsaw–Modlin, Wrocław; Seasonal: Alghero, Brindisi, Bucharest–Otopeni, Cuneo, Dublin, Edinburgh, Karlsruhe/Baden-Baden, Gdańsk, Parma, Rimini, Vienna, Zagreb |
| Scandinavian Airlines | Seasonal: Copenhagen, Oslo, Stockholm–Arlanda |
| Sky Alps | Seasonal: Bolzano (begins 15 May 2027), Mostar |
| Smartwings | Seasonal charter: Prague, Warsaw–Chopin |
| Swiss International Air Lines | Zürich |
| Transavia | Paris–Orly; Seasonal: Amsterdam, Lyon, Nantes, Rotterdam/The Hague |
| TUI Airways | Seasonal: London–Gatwick (begins 30 March 2027) |
| TUI fly Belgium | Seasonal: Brussels |
| Tunisair Express | Tunis |
| Turkish Airlines | Istanbul |
| United Airlines | Seasonal: Newark |
| Volotea | Ancona (resumes 6 November 2026), Florence, Naples, Verona; Seasonal: Athens, Bilbao, Bordeaux, Brest, Deauville, Heraklion, Lille, Lourdes, Lyon, Nantes, Olbia, Paris–Orly, Santorini, Strasbourg, Toulouse, Zakynthos |
| Vueling | Barcelona |
| Wizz Air | Barcelona, Bologna, Bratislava, Dortmund, Marrakesh, Milan–Malpensa, Naples (begins 1 March 2027), Pisa, Prague, Rome–Fiumicino, Sharm El Sheikh, Sofia, Tel Aviv, Tirana, Turin, Venice, Warsaw–Modlin; Seasonal: Belgrade, Skopje |

== Statistics ==
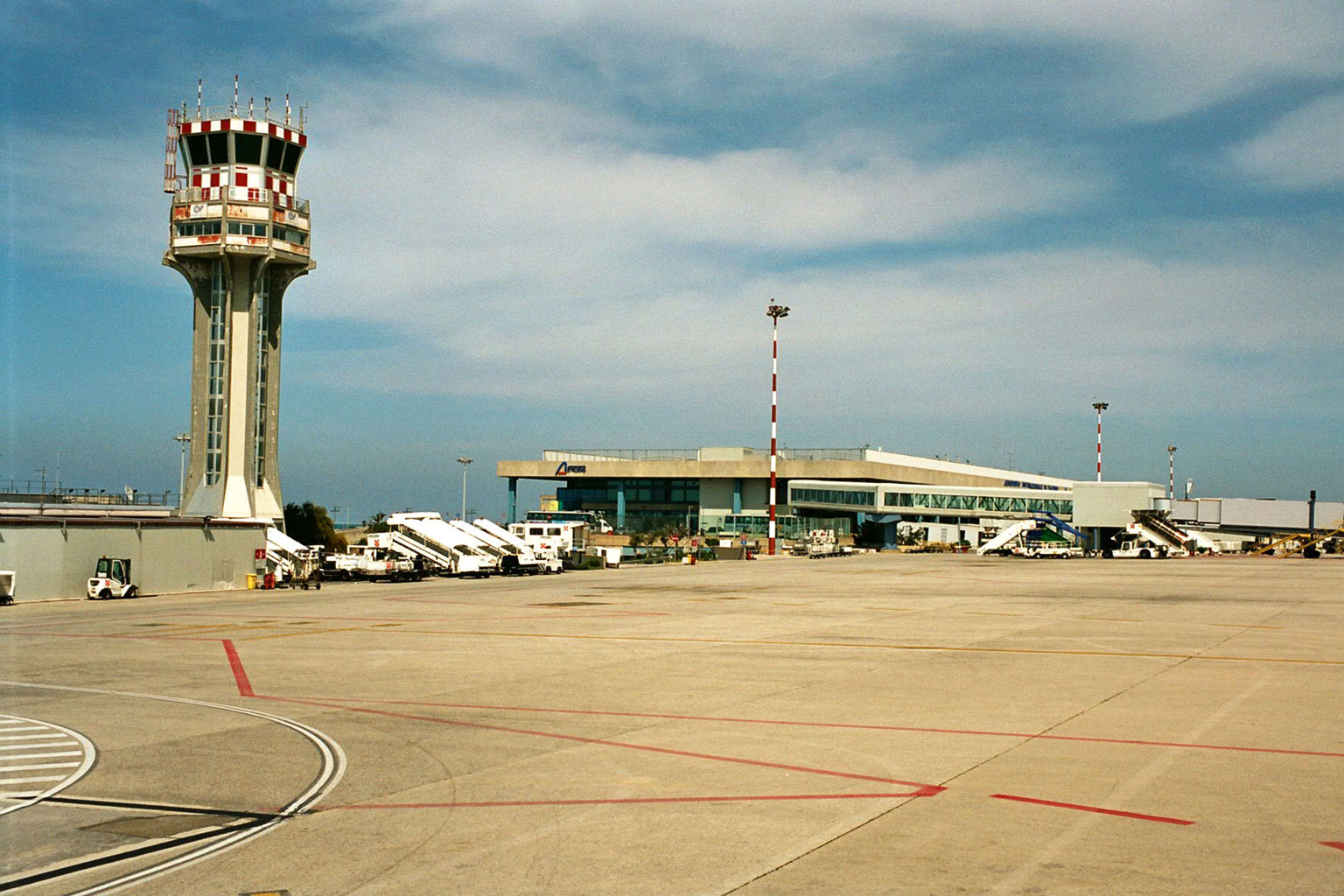
Apron view

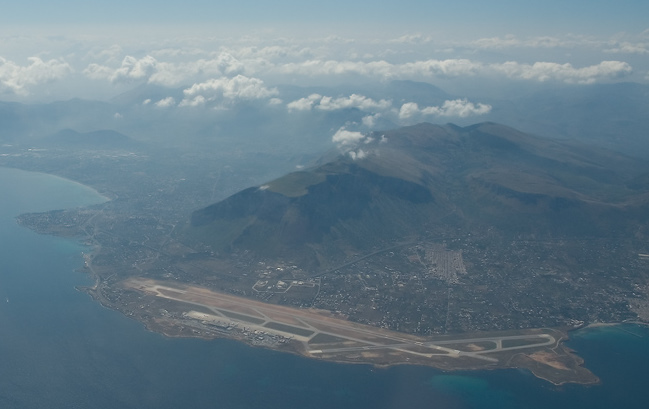
Aerial view

== Accidents and incidents ==
- On 5 May 1972, Alitalia Flight 112 flew into Mt. Longa on approach to Palermo Airport. All 115 aboard were killed.
- On 23 December 1978, Alitalia Flight 4128 crashed into the Tyrrhenian Sea while on approach to Palermo Airport.
- On 6 August 2005, Tuninter Flight 1153, an ATR 72–500, ran out of fuel while en route and ditched about 29 kilometres (18 mi) from the city of Palermo. 16 of the 39 people on board died.
- On 24 September 2010, Wind Jet Flight 243, operated by Airbus A319-132 EI-EDM, landed short of the runway after encountering a thunderstorm and windshear on approach. The aircraft was substantially damaged when it impacted the localiser. Both main undercarriage sets collapsed and the aircraft was evacuated by the emergency slides. Around 20 passengers were injured in the evacuation.

== Ground transport ==
=== Train ===
The airport's railway facility, Punta Raisi railway station, is the northwestern terminus of Palermo metropolitan railway service. It links the airport with Palermo Centrale railway station. A typical timetable on work days is a train every 30 minutes in each direction between early morning and around 10.00 pm.

=== Bus ===
There are several private bus companies, which stop at the bus station outside the terminal building and connect the airport with nearby Palermo city. There are further connections to/from Palermo, Catania, Messina and rest of Sicily.

== See also ==
- Catania Fontanarossa Airport Vincenzo Bellini – Sicily's major international airport
- Trapani Birgi Airport Vincenzo Florio – another of Sicily's international airports
- Comiso Airport Vincenzo Magliocco – another of Sicily's international airports
- List of airports in Italy
