= Palermo–Boccadifalco Airport =

Palermo–Boccadifalco Airport "Giuseppe and Francesco Notarbartolo" Airport
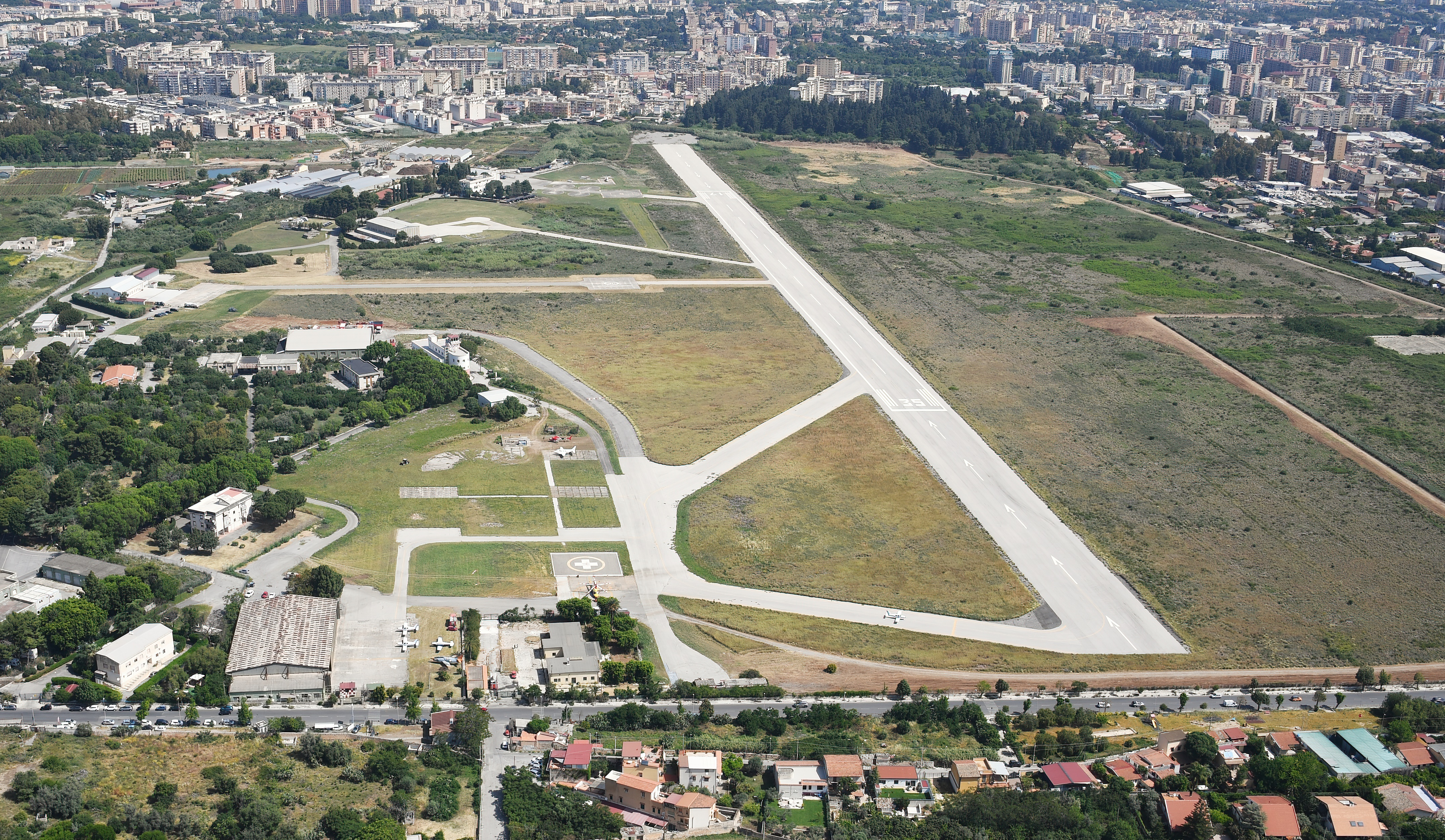
- Aerial view of the airport from the south
- IATA: none; ICAO: LICP

Summary
- Airport type: Public & Police
- Elevation AMSL: 345 ft / 105 m
- Coordinates: 38°07′06″N 13°18′47″E

Map

Runways
Direction	Length		Surface
Direction	ft	m	Surface
17/35	4,002	1,220	Asphalt

Palermo–Boccadifalco Airport (ICAO: LICP), also known as Giuseppe and Francesco Notarbartolo Airport, is the elder of two facilities which serve the Sicilian capital Palermo, in Italy. Located on the outskirts of the city, just before Monte Cuccio, it is one of the oldest airports in the country. Today it houses a Botanical garden and an ancient villa. The latter is used as the Officers' Club by the Italian Aeronautica Militare (Airforce).

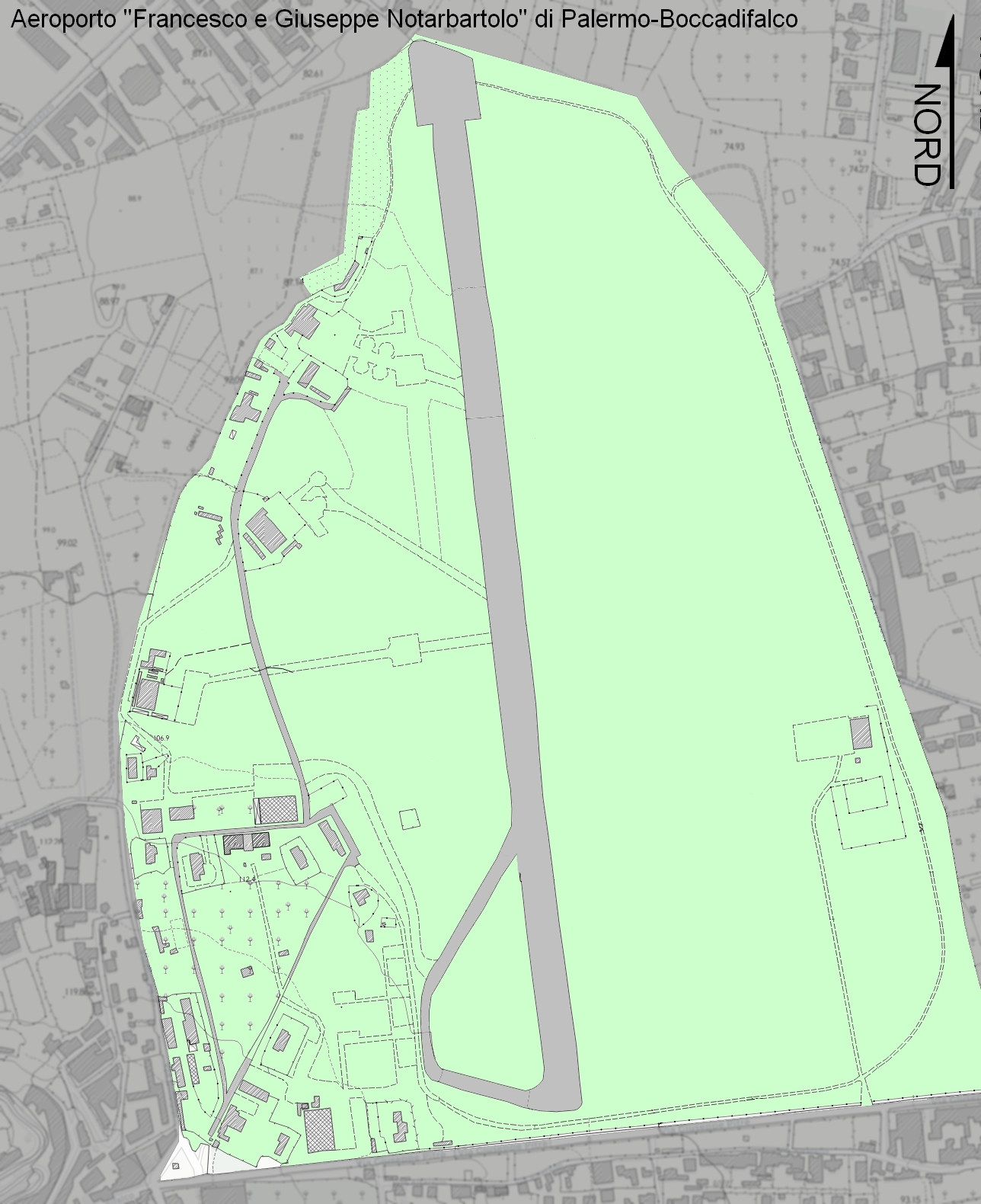
Map of the airport

== History ==
The airport was built during the early 1920s and became the base of the Italian Regia Aeronautica with Palermo as the headquarters of the 4th Aerial Zone. After being seized by Allied forces during the Invasion of Sicily (Operation Husky) in July 1943, it was used by the United States Army Air Forces Twelfth Air Force as a combat airfield. The 52d Fighter Group flew Supermarine Spitfires from the airport from the end of July until December 1943. It was turned back over to Italian authorities after the Americans advanced north into Italy.

After the war, it was Palermo's main airport and the third busiest in Italy. 1960 saw the opening of Palermo International Airport 33 kilometres (21 mi) west of the city; it was also called Punta Raisi Airport. The original site was under joint military–civil use until 1 January 2009, when the Italian aviation authority ENAC acquired sole use of the airport.

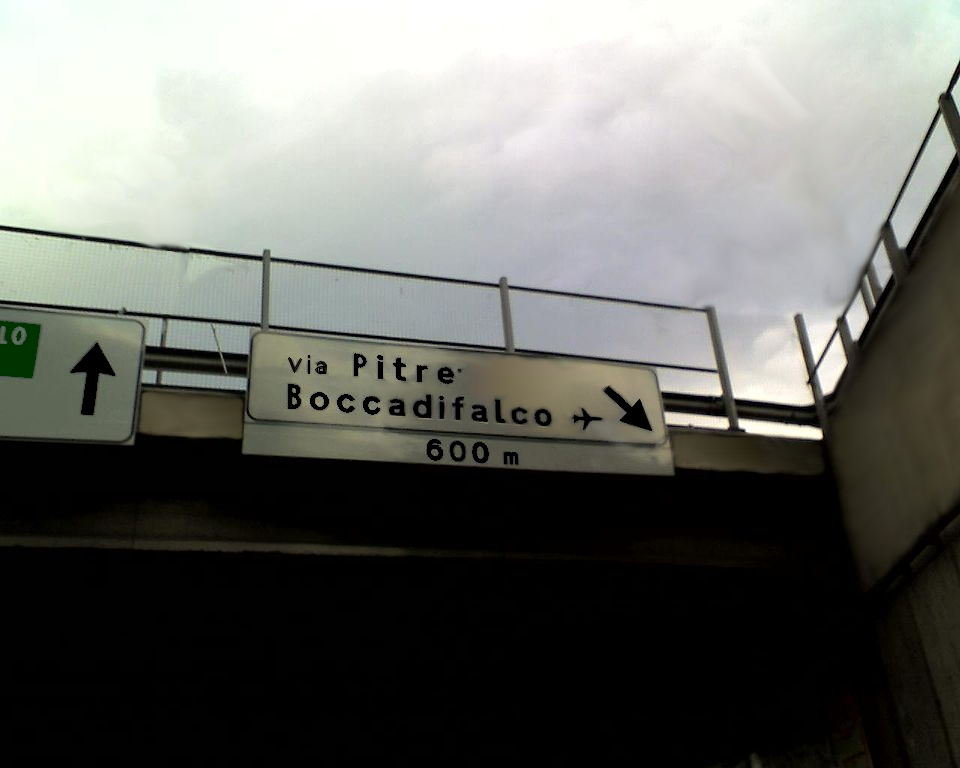
Road sign for the airport.

Some wreckage from the 2005 crash of Tuninter Flight 1153 was stored at the airport.

Today the airport is used by one of the local Aeroclub and for general aviation. As of 2011 no commercial flights are operated from the airport.

== Frequencies ==
- Boccadifalco (without flight control) 122.600 MHz
- Punta Raisi Monitor 119.050 MHz
- Palermo Radar 120.200 MHz

== See also ==
- Falcone–Borsellino Palermo International Airport
- Vincenzo Florio Trapani–Birgi Airport
