= Borizzo Airfield =

Abandoned military airfield in Italy

Borizzo Airfield
- Part of Twelfth Air Force

Site information
- Type: Military Airfield
- Controlled by: Italian Regia Aeronautica
- Condition: abandoned

Location
- Coordinates: 37°53′47.71″N 012°32′21.57″E
- Height: 58m

Site history
- Built: 1930s
- Built by: Italian Regia Aeronautica
- In use: till 1971
- Materials: tarmac (RWY 2/20, 1.600m)

Garrison information
- Occupants: United States Army Air Forces

Location of Borizzo Airfield, Italy

Borizzo Airfield (Trapani–Chinisia airport) is an abandoned World War II military airfield in Italy, which was located in the vicinity of Trapani on Sicily.

== History ==
It was built in the 1930s near the village of Borgo Rizzo and used by Axis forces as a base for the Italian Regia Aeronautica. During the Sicilian Campaign it was seized by elements of the United States Fifth Army. Once in Allied hands, it was used by the United States Army Air Force Twelfth Air Force 316th Troop Carrier Group, which flew C-47 Skytrains from the field between 18 October 1943 and 12 February 1944.

When the Americans left, the airfield was handed back to the Italians, who rebuilt the airport in 1949. The airport operated military and commercial flights until 1961 when the new Trapani–Birgi Airport was opened. It was finally abandoned in 1971 by the Italian Air Force and closed.

Today the only remains of the airport are the runway, the control tower and a few smaller buildings.

== The name ==
The Italians called the airport Trapani–Chinisia after the nearby river Chinisia but the allies used on their planes the name of the nearby village of Borgo Rizzo that was abbreviated on the documents as Borizzo. The official name of the airport was Aeroporto di Trapani-Chinisia and was also named in 1949 after the Italian aviator Livio Bassi.
