= Pantelleria Airport =

Italian airport

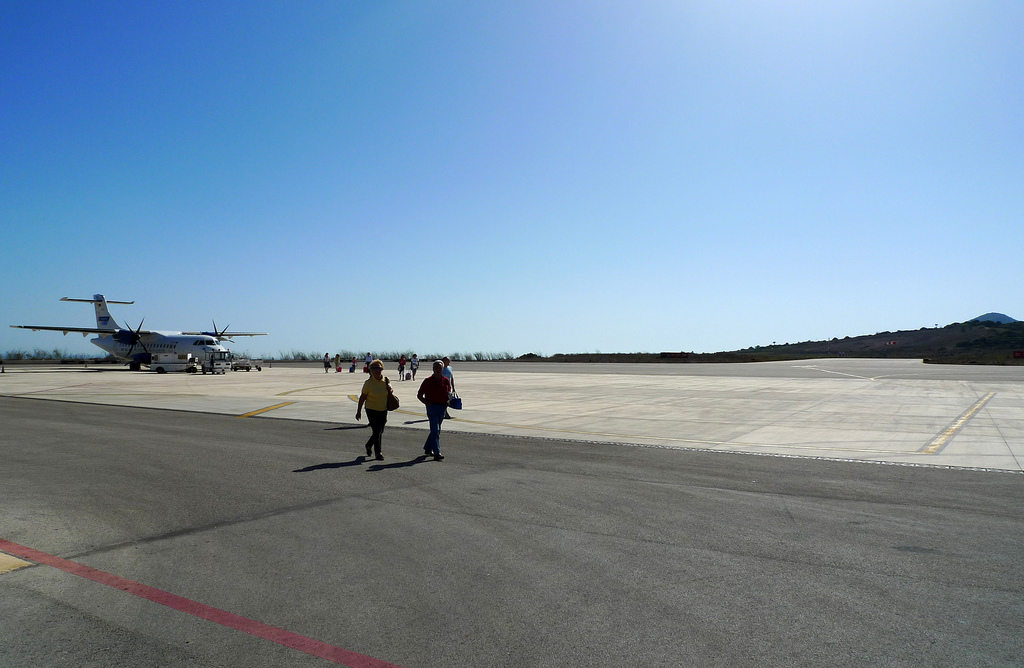
- IATA: PNL; ICAO: LICG

Summary
- Airport type: Public & military
- Location: Pantelleria
- Elevation AMSL: 635 ft (194 m)
- Coordinates: 36°48′59″N 11°58′7″E
- Website: aeroportodipantelleria.it

Map
- Location within Sicily Location within Italy

Runways
Direction	Length		Surface
Direction	ft	m	Surface
03/21	4,003	1,220	Asphalt
07/25	5,495	1,675	Asphalt

Pantelleria Airport (IATA: PNL, ICAO: LICG) is a regional airport on the Italian island of Pantelleria. It is located 5 kilometres (3.1 mi) from the town centre and features both regular and charter flights from and to Sicily and mainland Italy. It was a military airport until 2016, when it became a state owned civilian airport, although an Air Force detachment remained operational. There is an underground hangar, 340 m long and 26 m wide, which was completed in 1939 and called Nervi.

== Airlines and destinations ==
The following airlines operate from/to the airport:

Airlines	Destinations
DAT	Catania, Palermo, Trapani
HelloFly	Seasonal: Perugia
ITA Airways	Seasonal: Milan–Linate, Rome–Fiumicino
Volotea	Seasonal: Bologna, Bergamo, Milan–Linate, Venice, Verona

== In the media ==
The airport's terminal interior and apron can be seen in the 2016 movie A Bigger Splash starring Tilda Swinton.
