= Catania–Fontanarossa Airport =

Airport in Catania, Italy

Catania–Fontanarossa Airport Aeroporto di Catania-Fontanarossa

- IATA: CTA; ICAO: LICC

Summary
- Airport type: Public
- Operator: SAC
- Location: Catania
- Focus city for: Ryanair; Wizz Air
- Elevation AMSL: 39 ft (12 m)
- Coordinates: 37°28′00″N 15°03′50″E
- Website: aeroporto.catania.it

Map
- Location within Sicily CTA (Italy)

Runways
| Direction | Length | | Surface |
| Direction | m | ft | Surface |
|---|---|---|---|
| 08/26 | 2,560 | 7,989 | Asphalt |

Statistics (2024)
- Passengers: 12,346,530
- Passenger change 23-24: ▲15.0%
- Aircraft movements: 82,530
- Movements change 23-24: ▲12.8%
- Cargo (tons): 5,146
- Cargo change 23-24: ▼ -21.9%
- Source: Italian AIP at EUROCONTROL; Statistics from Assaeroporti

Catania–Fontanarossa Airport (IATA: CTA, ICAO: LICC), also known as Vincenzo Bellini Airport (Italian: Aeroporto Internazionale Vincenzo Bellini di Catania-Fontanarossa), is an international airport 2.3 NM (4.3 km; 2.6 mi) southwest of Catania, the second largest city on the Italian island of Sicily. It is named after the opera composer Vincenzo Bellini, who was born in Catania.

According to Assaeroporti, it is the busiest airport in Sicily and the fourth busiest in Italy in 2020. Major airlines such as ITA Airways, Lufthansa and KLM offer services here and connect numerous European destinations such as Rome, Munich, Amsterdam and Berlin, while low-cost airlines such as easyJet and Ryanair offer flights to popular European destinations such as London and Paris.

With nearly two million passengers carried in 2016, the Catania/Fontanarossa – Rome/Fiumicino route is Italy's busiest air route, and Europe's second busiest in 2021.

Sometimes, volcanic ash from volcanic eruptions from nearby Mount Etna lead to short-term closures of the airport (usually no more than one day).

== History ==
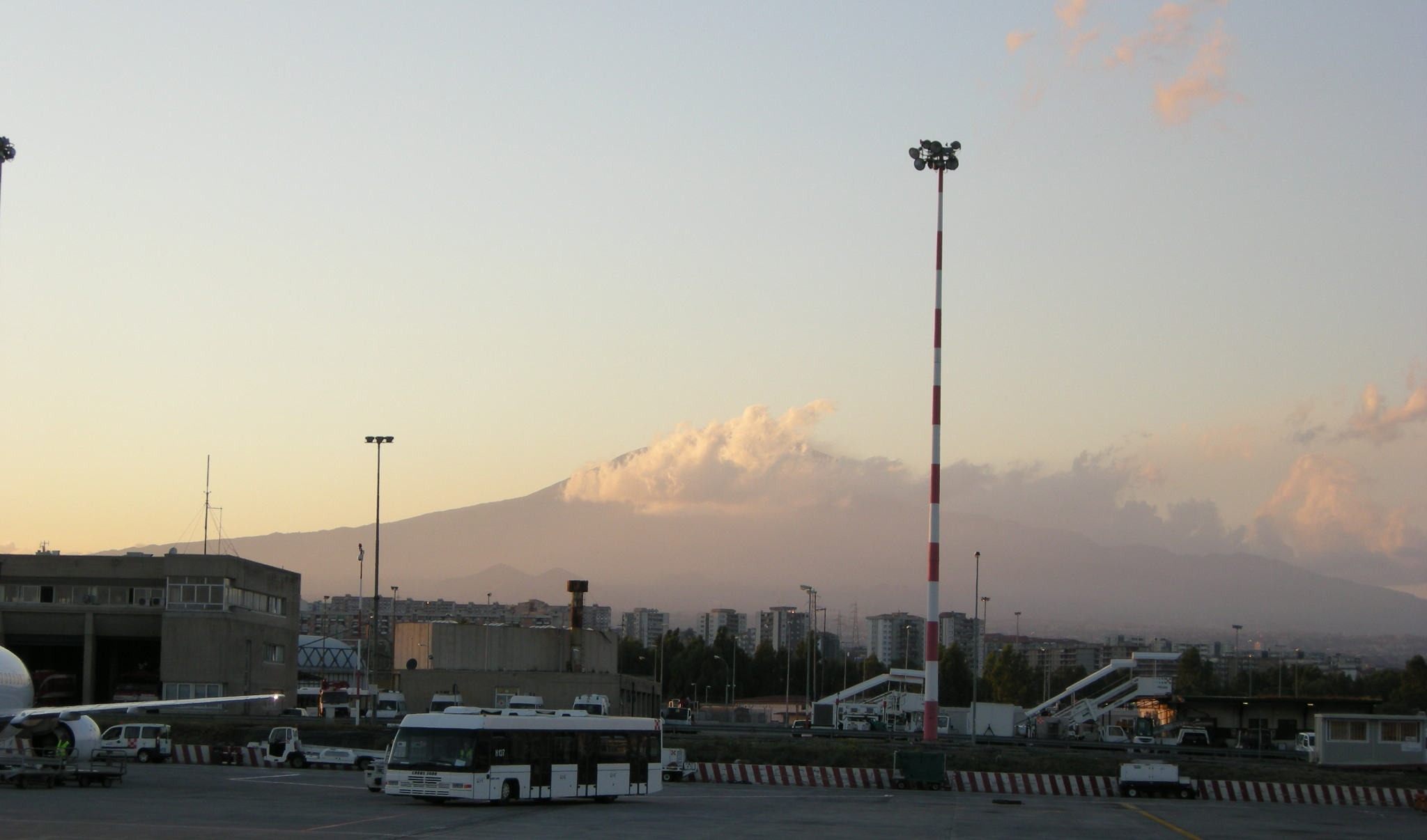
The airport's apron with the Etna volcano visible in the background

=== Early years ===
Catania Airport's history dates back to 1924, when it was the region's first airport. During World War II it was seized by the Allies during the Sicily Campaign and used by the United States Army Air Forces as a military airfield. Twelfth Air Force used the airport as a combat airfield, stationing the 340th Bombardment Group, which flew B-25 Mitchells from 27 August to 19 November 1943. In addition, the HQ, 51st Troop Carrier Wing used the airport from 29 September 1943 to 29 June 1944. Various transport units used the airport for the rest of the war. After the war, it was turned back over to civil authorities.

By the late 1940s, it was clear that the airport was fast running out of space and it was deemed necessary to relocate it. In 1950, the new bigger and improved Catania Airport opened for business.

After 20 years of unexpected growth and high passengers levels, in 1981 it was once again necessary to restructure the airport to cope with demand.

=== Developments since the 2000s ===
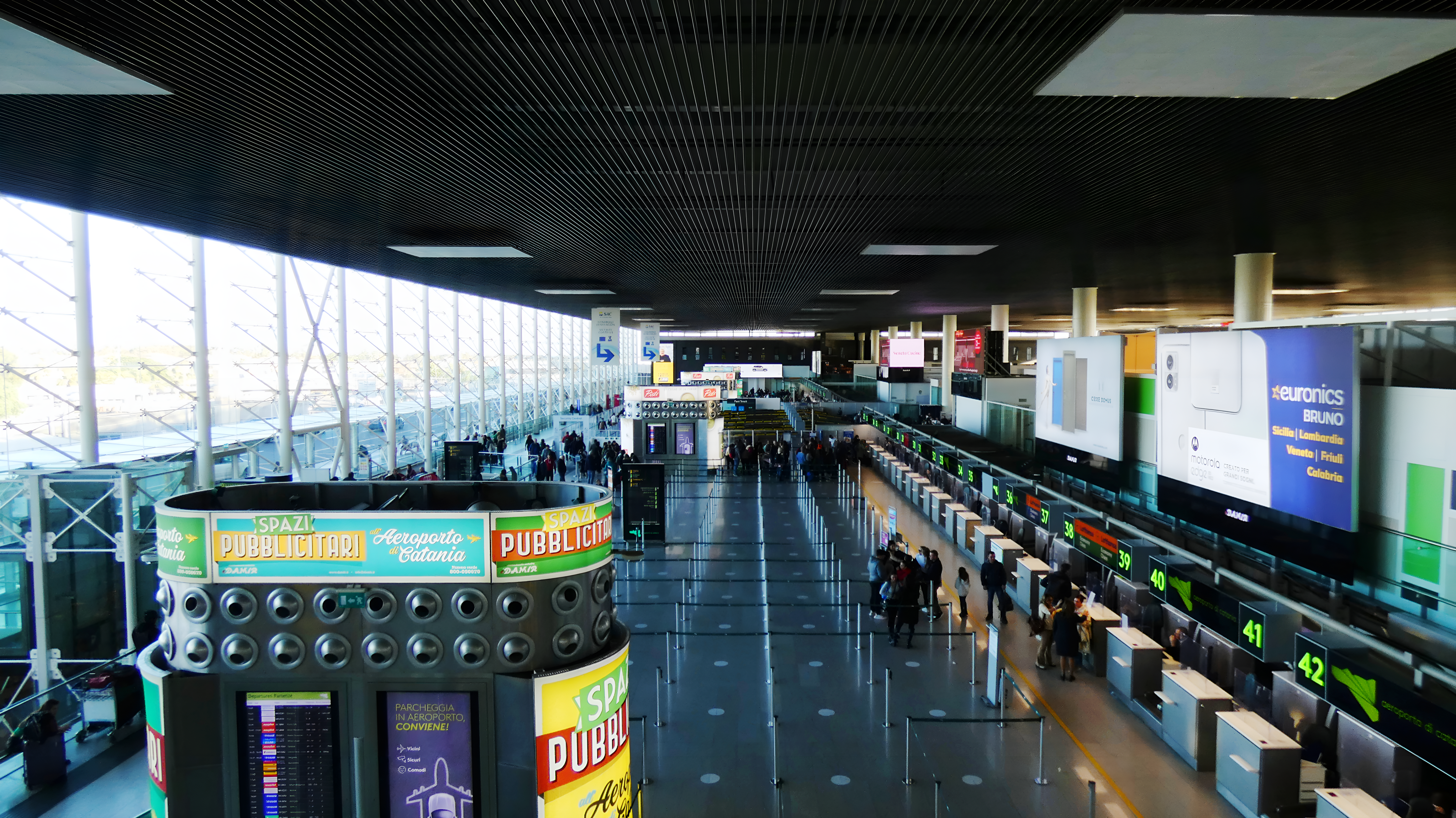
Check-in zone of Terminal A

In order to cope with the increasing passengers figures, a new terminal, equipped with 22 gates and six loading bridges, opened on 8 May 2007 replacing the old facilities. The current "investment programme" has ensured that Catania Fontanarossa Airport continues to look forward and plan for growth over the next ten years, implementing a whole new infrastructure and making many additions, including a panoramic restaurant, a new airside runway and further office space.

Ryanair started flying to Catania in 2013, initially announcing only one route to Catania while also starting operations to Comiso Airport, a new airport which opened in 2013 and is located approximately 100 km (60 mi) from Catania, near the city of Ragusa.

To cope with the fast passenger growth, two additional terminals were opened in 2018 (Terminal B and C). Terminal C is used exclusively by easyJet.

=== 2023 terminal fire and temporary disruption ===
On 16 July 2023, a part of the airport was burned in a fire of unclear origin. Flights to Catania on that day were redirected to Comiso, Palermo and Trapani, and other flight activity was almost entirely interrupted until the following 19 July. Flights over the following 3 week period continued to be disrupted until the normal operations were fully resumed on 5 August.

== Airlines and destinations ==
The following airlines operate regular scheduled and charter flights at Catania–Fontanarossa Airport:

| Airlines | Destinations |
|---|---|
| Aegean Airlines | Seasonal: Athens |
| Aer Lingus | Seasonal: Dublin |
| Aeroitalia | Rome–Fiumicino, Bergamo; Seasonal: Cagliari |
| Air Arabia | Casablanca |
| Air Cairo | Seasonal: El Alamein, Sharm El Sheikh |
| Air Canada | Seasonal: Montréal–Trudeau |
| Air France | Seasonal: Paris–Charles de Gaulle |
| Air Serbia | Seasonal: Belgrade |
| airBaltic | Seasonal: Riga |
| Austrian Airlines | Seasonal: Vienna |
| British Airways | Seasonal: London-Gatwick |
| Brussels Airlines | Seasonal: Brussels |
| DAT | Lampedusa, Pantelleria |
| Delta Air Lines | New York–JFK |
| easyJet | Basel/Mulhouse, Berlin, Geneva, London–Gatwick, Milan–Malpensa, Naples, Paris–Charles de Gaulle; Seasonal: Bordeaux, Bristol, Edinburgh, London–Luton, Lyon, Manchester, Nantes |
| Edelweiss Air | Seasonal: Zurich |
| Eurowings | Düsseldorf, Stuttgart; Seasonal: Cologne/Bonn, Hamburg |
| Finnair | Seasonal: Helsinki |
| flydubai | Dubai–International |
| FLYYO | Seasonal charter: Tel Aviv |
| Iberia | Seasonal: Madrid |
| Israir | Seasonal: Tel Aviv |
| ITA Airways | Milan–Linate, Rome–Fiumicino |
| Jet2.com | Seasonal: Birmingham, Edinburgh, Leeds/Bradford, London–Stansted, Manchester |
| KLM | Amsterdam |
| KM Malta Airlines | Seasonal: Malta |
| Lufthansa | Frankfurt, Munich |
| Lufthansa City Airlines | Munich |
| Luxair | Seasonal: Luxembourg |
| Neos | Seasonal: Bergamo, Milan–Malpensa, Rhodes, Zanzibar |
| Norwegian Air Shuttle | Seasonal: Copenhagen, Oslo, Stockholm–Arlanda |
| Royal Air Maroc | Casablanca |
| Ryanair | Alicante (begins 25 October 2026), Ancona, Bari, Beauvais, Berlin, Bologna, Bucharest–Otopeni, Budapest, Cagliari, Charleroi, Eindhoven, Frankfurt-Hahn, Gdańsk (begins 26 October 2026), Genoa, Katowice, Kraków, London–Stansted, Madrid, Malta, Memmingen (begins 26 October 2026), Milan-Bergamo, Milan–Malpensa, Naples, Perugia, Pescara, Pisa, Porto (begins 26 October 2026), Prague, Rimini, Rome–Fiumicino, Seville, Sofia, Tirana, Trieste, Turin, Valencia (begins 25 October 2026), Venice, Verona, Vienna, Warsaw–Chopin (begins 25 October 2026), Warsaw–Modlin; Seasonal: Alghero, Athens, Heraklion, London–Luton, Marseille, Rhodes |
| Scandinavian Airlines | Seasonal: Copenhagen, Oslo |
| SkyAlps | Seasonal: Bolzano |
| Smartwings | Seasonal: Prague; Seasonal charter: Warsaw–Chopin |
| Swiss International Air Lines | Seasonal: Geneva |
| Transavia | Seasonal: Amsterdam, Lyon, Rotterdam/The Hague |
| TUI fly Belgium | Seasonal: Brussels |
| Turkish Airlines | Istanbul |
| United Airlines | Seasonal: Newark (begins 29 May 2027) |
| Volotea | Ancona, Verona; Seasonal: Florence, Lourdes, Nantes, Salerno |
| Vueling | Barcelona, Florence |
| Wizz Air | Alicante (begins 15 December 2026), Bologna, Bucharest–Otopeni, Budapest, Gdańsk, Iași, Katowice, Kraków, Memmingen, Milan–Malpensa, Podgorica, Porto (begins 27 October 2026), Prague, Rome–Fiumicino (begins 14 December 2026), Tel Aviv, Tirana, Turin, Valencia (begins 14 December 2026), Venice, Verona, Vilnius, Warsaw–Chopin; Seasonal: Cluj-Napoca, London–Gatwick, Sharm El Sheikh, Wrocław |

== Ground transportation ==
=== Train ===
A new train station, Catania-Aeroporto Fontanarossa served by regional train lines such as the Messina-Syracuse railway, the Catania-Palermo railway, as well as the Catania-Caltagirone railway. Catania-Aeroporto Fontanarossa rail station is part of Catania's suburban railway line. The station is situated between Bicocca and Catania-Acquicella stations. A typical journey to and from Catania Central Station will take less than 10 minutes, and approximately one hour to and from Syracuse or Taormina train stations.

=== Car ===
The airport is located close to the A19 motorway, which links Catania with Palermo and central Sicily, while the European route E45 runs to Syracuse in the south.

=== Bus ===
A shuttle bus service provides transport into Catania city centre and the Central Train Station, while scheduled bus services to other parts of the island are also available direct from the airport. The main bus station is opposite the railway station and 10 minutes walk from the city centre.

== See also ==
Other airports in Sicily:

- Palermo Airport Falcone e Borsellino – also known as Punta Raisi Airport
- Trapani Birgi Airport Vincenzo Florio
- Comiso Airport Vincenzo Magliocco
