= Lampedusa Airport =

Airport in Sicily, Italy

Lampedusa Airport Aeroporto di Lampedusa
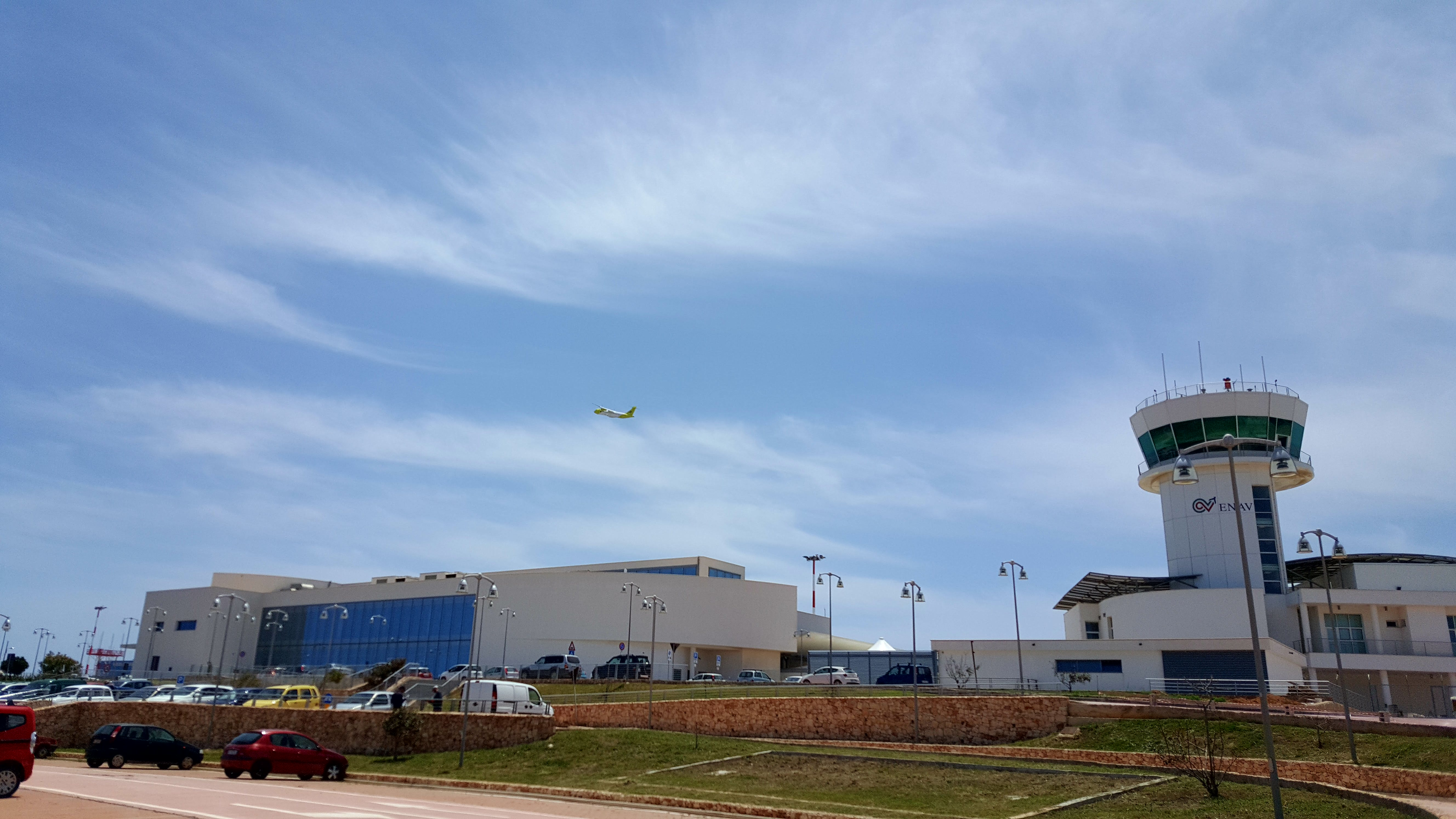
- IATA: LMP; ICAO: LICD

Summary
- Airport type: Public
- Operator: AST Aeroservizi S.p.A.
- Serves: Lampedusa, Linosa, Italy
- Location: Lampedusa
- Elevation AMSL: 69 ft (21 m)
- Coordinates: 35°29′52″N 12°37′5″E
- Website: aeroportodilampedusa.com

Map
- Location within Italy

Runways
Direction	Length		Surface
Direction	ft	m	Surface
08/26	5,889	1,795	Asphalt

Statistics (2024)
- Passengers: 349,449
- Passenger change 23-24: ▲3%
- Aircraft movements: 7,699
- Movements change 23-24: ▼ -3.9%
- Statistics from Assaeroporti

Lampedusa Airport is an airport on the Italian island of Lampedusa in the Province of Agrigento, Sicily (IATA: LMP, ICAO: LICD). It is located a few hundred metres from the city centre, and reaches its traffic peaks in the summer period, as several airlines run tourism-focused flights to this Mediterranean island.

== Airlines and destinations ==
The following airlines operate regular scheduled and charter flights at Lampedusa Airport:

Airlines	Destinations
Air Horizont	Seasonal charter: Milan–Malpensa
DAT	Catania, Palermo, Trapani
easyJet	Seasonal: Milan–Malpensa, Naples
HelloFly	Seasonal: Perugia
ITA Airways	Seasonal: Milan–Linate
Volotea	Seasonal: Naples, Venice, Verona
Wizz Air	Seasonal: Milan–Malpensa, Rome–Fiumicino
