= Trapani–Birgi Airport =

Trapani-Birgi Airport Aeroporto civile Vincenzo Florio Aeroporto militare Livio Bassi
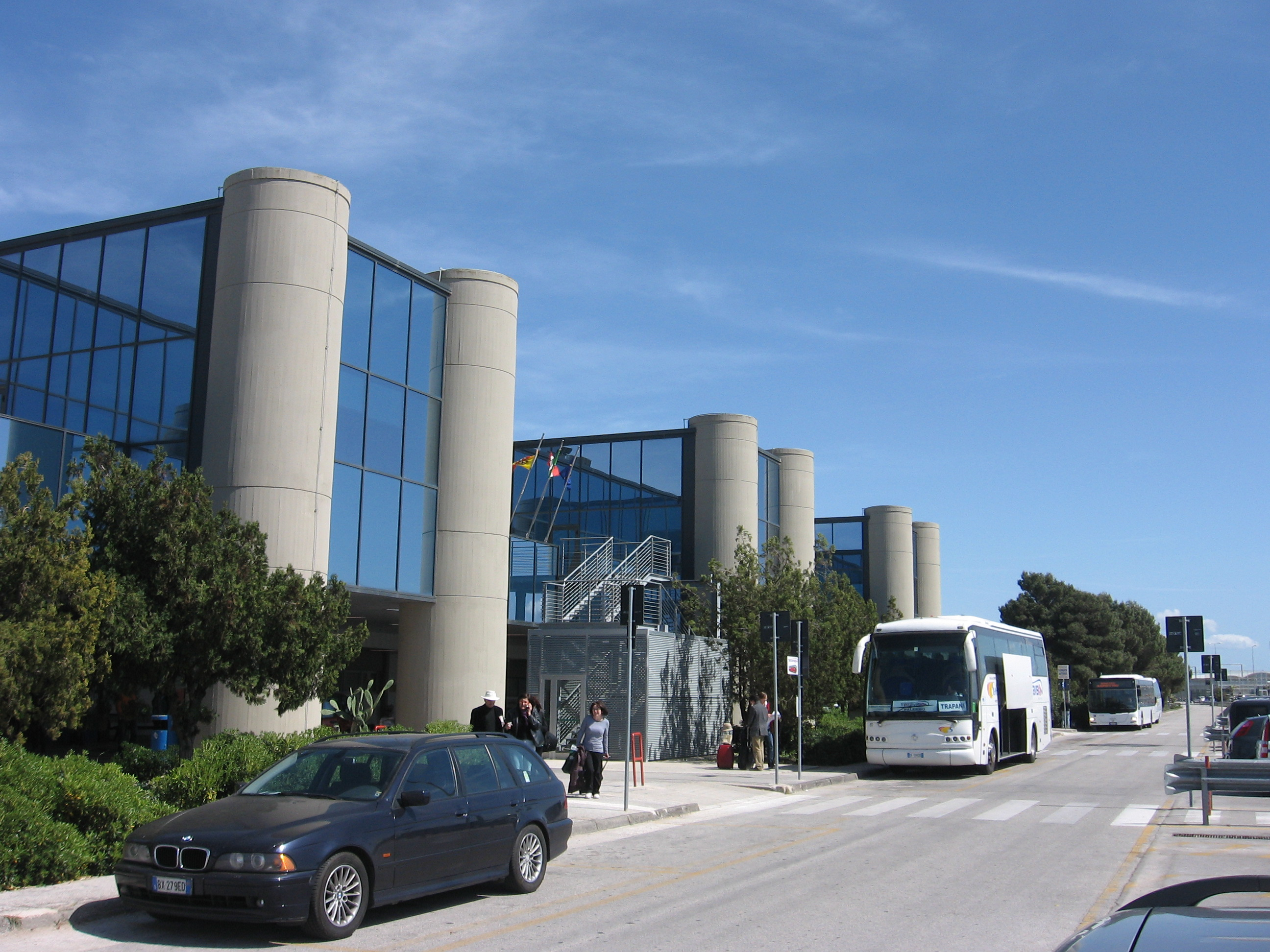
- IATA: TPS; ICAO: LICT

Summary
- Airport type: Military/public
- Serves: Province of Trapani, Italy
- Operating base for: Ryanair
- Elevation AMSL: 25 ft (7.6 m)
- Coordinates: 37°54′43″N 012°29′36″E
- Website: www.airgest.it

Map
- Location of the airport in Sicily TPS (Italy)

Runways
Direction	Length		Surface
Direction	m	ft	Surface
13R/31L	2,695	8,841	Bitumen
13L/31R	2,620	8,595	Bitumen

Statistics (2025)
- Passengers: 1,007,409
- Passenger change 24–25: ▼6.29%
- Statistics from Airgest.it

Trapani–Birgi Airport (IATA: TPS, ICAO: LICT), officially known as Vincenzo Florio Airport, is a dual-use civil and military airport in western Sicily, Italy. Civilian operations are managed by Airgest, while the airport also hosts Italian Air Force activities and serves as one of the forward operating bases used by NATO’s Airborne Early Warning and Control Force.

Situated between the cities of Trapani and Marsala, it is one of six passenger airports in Sicily and functions as a secondary international gateway, providing scheduled domestic and international passenger services, including subsidised routes to smaller island communities such as Pantelleria.

== History ==
Aviation activity in the Trapani area predates the opening of Trapani–Birgi Airport. After the Second World War, civilian air services were operated from Trapani–Chinisia Airport, which remained open to civil traffic between 1955 and 1961. Following the closure of Trapani–Chinisia, the role of the area’s civilian airport was transferred to Birgi.

Trapani–Birgi was developed in the early 1960s. Civil aviation activities began in 1964, with initial scheduled services linking Trapani to Palermo, Pantelleria and Tunis. From the same period, the airport also hosted military activities, establishing its role as a facility with both civilian and military functions.

From 1964 until the mid-1980s, scheduled civilian services were operated by Aero Trasporti Italiani on the Rome–Naples–Palermo–Trapani route, with connections to Lampedusa added from 1968. During the 1970s, an increase in military activity at Birgi contributed to the progressive definition of separate operational areas for civilian and military use within the airport.

In June 2003, agreements between the Italian Civil Aviation Authority and the Sicilian regional government led to the introduction of subsidised public service air routes. Around the same time, responsibility for civilian airport operations was assigned to Airgest, beginning a new phase of development for the airport’s civilian activities alongside its ongoing military use.

== Military use ==
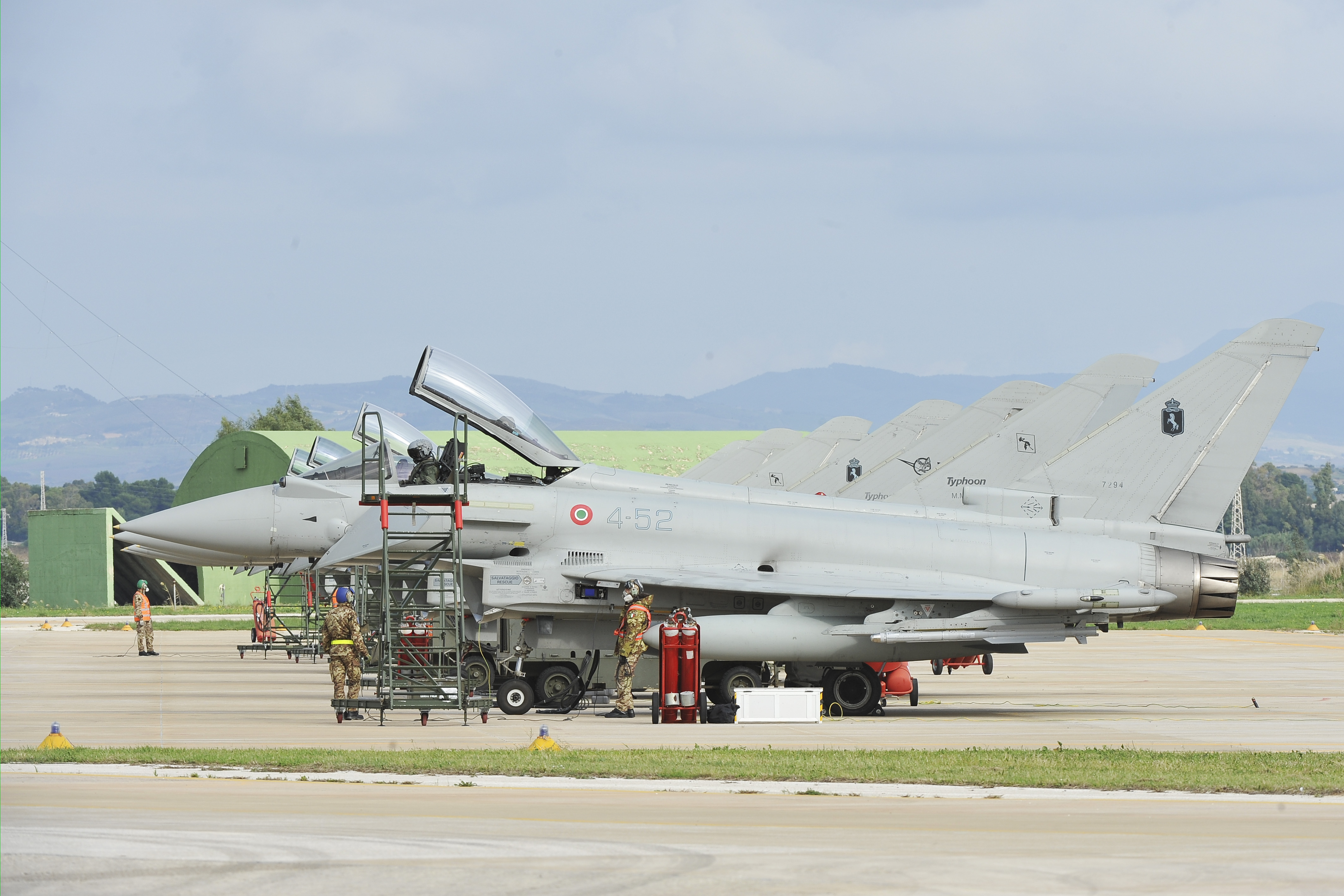
Eurofighter Typhoon of the Aeronautica Militare Italiana in Trapani

Trapani–Birgi is the base of the Italian Air Force’s 37° Stormo (37th Fighter Wing), which is responsible for the surveillance and defence of Italian airspace and operates from the airport year-round.

The Italian Air Force conducts regular air defence operations from Birgi, including quick-reaction alert missions involving Eurofighter Typhoon aircraft operating from the airfield. The airport is one of the forward operating bases (FOBs) used by the NATO Airborne Early Warning and Control Force based at NATO Air Base Geilenkirchen in Germany.

In September 2025 it was announced that Trapani–Birgi will become home to a global F-35 training base, conceived as the first pilot training centre for the Lockheed Martin F-35 Lightning II outside the United States. The facility is expected to include advanced training infrastructure, and initial training capability is anticipated by late 2028, with full operational status projected by mid-2029.

== Airlines and destinations ==
Trapani–Birgi Airport has scheduled passenger flights, with some routes operating only seasonally. Ryanair began operating routes from the airport in 2006, opened a base in 2009, and announced the opening of a new base in 2026, accompanied by several additional routes. Public service obligation services have also operated between Trapani and Pantelleria, including flights operated by DAT from 1 July 2018. AlbaStar has also operated services from the airport.

Airlines	Destinations
DAT	Pantelleria
Hello Fly	Lampedusa
ITA Airways	Seasonal: Rome–Fiumicino
Ryanair	Bologna, London–Stansted, Malta, Milan-Bergamo, Pisa, Rome–Fiumicino, Turin, Venice; Seasonal: Bari, Bratislava, Bournemouth, Brussels-Charleroi, Karlsruhe/Baden-Baden, Katowice, Manchester, Milan–Malpensa, Pescara, Porto, Saarbrücken, Seville, Stockholm–Arlanda, Verona, Lublin, Weeze

== Air traffic statistics ==
Passenger figures are annual totals as reported by Airgest.

Year	Domestic passengers	International passengers	Total passengers	Var % prev. year
2025	758,542	246,003	1,007,409	▼6.29
2024	760,797	310,191	1,074,939	▼19.32
2023	924,174	400,964	1,332,368	▲49.42
2022	637,212	252,980	891,670	▲108.4
2021	366,841	56,894	427,893	▲131.9
2020	169,165	12,343	185,581	▼54.9
2019	322,218	80,732	411,437	▼14.4
2018	366,801	103,324	480,524	▼62.8
2017	923,284	366,801	1,292,957	▼13.4
2016	1,151,515	339,385	1,493,519	▼5.9
2015	1,195,377	389,966	1,586,992	▼0.7
2014	1,159,837	436,705	1,598,571	▼14.9
2013	1,279,972	596,828	1,878,557	▲19.0
2012	1,110,532	465,937	1,578,753	▲7.36
2011	918,027	550,769	1,470,508	▼12.6
2010	1,024,755	656,573	1,682,991	▲57.4
2009	757,555	301,308	1,069,528	▲100.5
2008	342,025	186,774	533,310	▲5.2
2007	432,943	72,946	507,185	▲62.3
2006	305,895	4,802	312,459	▼19.8
2005	385,612	2,194	389,735	▼5.2
2004	382,867	19,071	410,898	▲66.7

Source: Airgest (official Trapani–Birgi Airport operator).

== Ground transport ==
=== Bus ===
Trapani–Birgi Airport is connected by regular bus and shuttle services to the city of Trapani and to major destinations in western Sicily, including Marsala, Palermo and Agrigento. According to the airport operator Airgest, these services are provided primarily by Autoservizi Salemi (serving Trapani, Marsala and Palermo), Autolinee Lumia (serving Agrigento), and Azienda Siciliana Trasporti (serving Trapani), with additional onward connections available from these hubs to other towns in the region.

=== Train ===
The airport is equidistant from both Trapani and Marsala railway stations. As of May 2026 a project is underway to construct a new railway station serving the airport.

Rete Ferroviaria Italiana launched a tender for the construction of the new train station, officially named "Vincenzo Florio", in December 2023. FS Group stated in August 2025 that construction had begun, with completion slated for July 2026.
