= 44th Expeditionary Air Refueling Squadron =

US Air Force unit

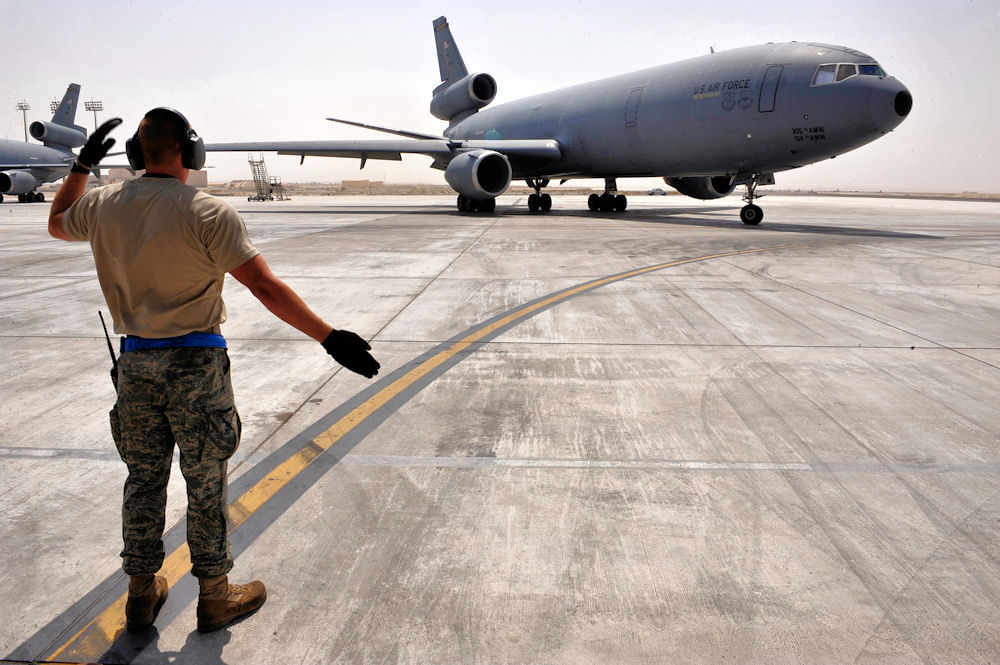
- KC-10 Extender deployed to Southwest Asia
- Active: 1942–1946; 1953–1964; after 2002
- Country: United States
- Branch: United States Air Force
- Role: Aerial refueling
- Mottos: Versatility and Dependability
- Engagements: European Theater of Operations; Mediterranean Theater of Operations
- Decorations: Distinguished Unit Citation

Insignia
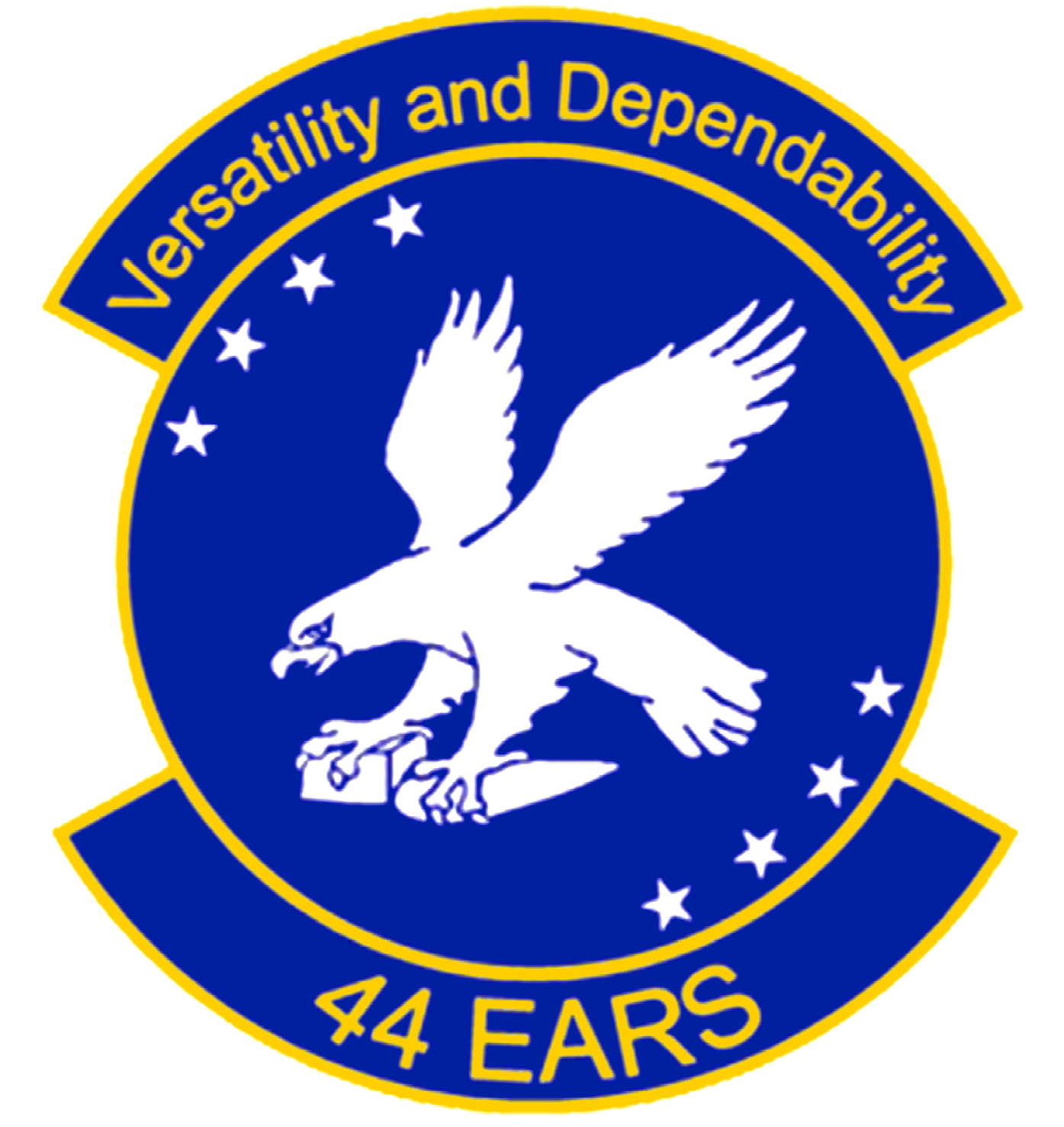
- 44th Expeditionary Air Refueling Squadron emblem

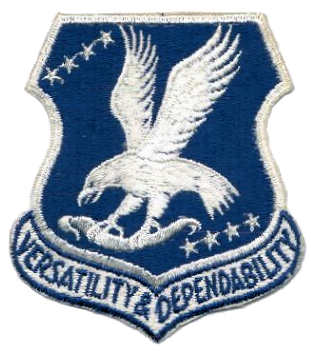
- 44th Air Refueling Squadron emblem (Note: Approved 27 July 1956.)

The 44th Expeditionary Air Refueling Squadron is a provisional United States Air Force unit that was assigned to the 379th Air Expeditionary Wing. It was last known to be stationed at Al-Udeid Air Base, Qatar, where it engaged in air refueling operations in support of United States Air Forces Central.

The earliest predecessor of the squadron was the 44th Troop Carrier Squadron, which served in the European and Mediterranean Theaters of Operations during World War II, where it earned three Distinguished Unit Citations. After the war, it served briefly as an airlift unit in the United States and Hawaii.

The 44th Air Refueling Squadron served with Strategic Air Command from 1953 to 1964 with Boeing KC-97 Stratofreighters at Chennault Air Force Base, Louisiana and Selfridge Air Force Base, Michigan. The two squadrons were consolidated into a single unit in 1985. The consolidated unit was converted to provisional status in 2002.

== History ==
=== World War II ===
The 44th Transport Squadron was activated in June 1942 under I Troop Carrier Command at Patterson Field, Ohio. It trained at various stations in the southeast and Texas with Douglas C-47 Skytrain transports. The squadron, by now the 44th Troop Carrier Squadron, deployed to Egypt in November 1942 as part of President Roosevelt's decision to aid the Western Desert Air Force of the Royal Air Force. There it became part of the newly established Ninth Air Force, headquartered in Cairo.

The 44th transported supplies and evacuated casualties in support of the British Eighth Army, operating from desert airfields in Egypt and Libya. It was reassigned in May 1943 to the Twelfth Air Force in Algeria, where it supported United States Fifth Army forces in the Tunisian Campaign. The squadron began training for the invasion of Sicily. It dropped paratroops over the assault area of the island on the night of 9 July. It carried reinforcements to Sicily on 11 July and received a Distinguished Unit Citation (DUC) for carrying out that mission although severely attacked by ground and naval forces. It dropped paratroops over the beachhead south of the Sele River on the night of 14 September 1943. The squadron remained in the Mediterranean Theater of Operations until February 1944, when it again joined Ninth Air Force in England. It became part of IX Troop Carrier Command, participating in the buildup of forces prior to the Allied landings in France.

The Squadron engaged in combat operations by dropping paratroops into Normandy near Ste-Mere-Eglise on D-Day (6 June 1944) and releasing gliders with reinforcements on the following day. The unit received a third DUC and a French citation for these missions.

After the Normandy invasion the squadron ferried supplies in the United Kingdom. The squadron also hauled food, clothing, medicine, gasoline, ordnance equipment, and other supplies to the front lines and evacuated patients to rear zone hospitals. It dropped paratroops near Nijmegen and towed gliders carrying reinforcements during Operation Market Garden, the airborne attack on the Netherlands. In December it participated in the Battle of the Bulge by releasing gliders with supplies for the 101st Airborne Division near Bastogne.

The squadron returned to the United States in May 1945, becoming a domestic airlift squadron for Continental Air Forces. It was reassigned to VI Air Service Area Command in Hawaii in September 1945, where it operated until being inactivated in early 1946.

=== Cold War ===
The 44th Air Refueling Squadron was established as a Strategic Air Command (SAC) Boeing KC-97 Stratofreighter squadron, providing aerial refueling for Boeing B-47 Stratojets of the 44th Bombardment Wing. With the retirement of the B-47 at Chennault Air Force Base, Louisiana in 1960, the squadron moved to Selfridge Air Force Base, Michigan as part of SAC's 4045th Air Refueling Wing. It was inactivated in 1964.

=== Modern Era ===
The squadron was converted to provisional status and reactivated as the 44th Expeditionary Air Refueling Squadron, an Air Combat Command McDonnell Douglas KC-10 Extender air refueling squadron in 2002 as part of the global war on terrorism.

== Lineage ==
44th Troop Carrier Squadron

- Constituted as the 44th Transport Squadron on 30 May 1942

Activated on 15 June 1942
Redesignated 44th Troop Carrier Squadron on 4 July 1942
Inactivated on 25 March 1946

- Consolidated with the 44th Air Refueling Squadron, Medium on 19 September 1985 as the 44th Air Refueling Squadron, Heavy (remained inactive)

44th Air Refueling Squadron

Constituted as the 44th Air Refueling Squadron, Medium on 13 February 1953
Activated on 20 April 1953
Discontinued and inactivated on 15 December 1964

- Consolidated with the 44th Troop Carrier Squadron on 19 September 1985 as the 44th Air Refueling Squadron, Heavy (remained inactive)
- Redesignated 44th Air Refueling Squadron on 9 September 1994 (Remained inactive)
- Redesignated 44th Expeditionary Air Refueling Squadron, and converted to provisional status, on 25 January 2002.

=== Assignments ===
- 316 Transport Group (later, 316 Troop Carrier Group), 15 June 1942
- I Troop Carrier Command, May 1945
- VII Air Service Area Command, attached 3 August 1945 – 25 March 1946
- 44th Bombardment Wing, 20 April 1953
- 4045th Air Refueling Wing, 1 June 1960
- 500th Air Refueling Wing, 1 January 1963 – 15 December 1964
- Air Combat Command to activate or inactivate at any time after 25 January 2002.

379th Air Expeditionary Wing, 25 January 2002 – unknown

=== Stations ===
- Patterson Field, Ohio, 15 June 1942
- Bowman Field, Kentucky, 16 June 1942
- Lawson Field, Georgia, 9 August 1942
- Del Valle Army Air Base, Texas, 29 September 1942 – 10 November 1942
- RAF Deversoir, Egypt, 23 November 1942
- RAF El Adem, Egypt, 10 December 1942
- RAF Fayid, Egypt, January 1943
- Nouvion Airfield, Algeria, 10 May 1943
- Guercif Airfield, French Morocco, 28 May 1943
- Enfidaville Airfield, Tunisia, 24 June 1943
- Mazzara Airfield, Sicily, 1 September 1943
- Borizzo Airfield, Sicily, 18 October 1943 – 16 February 1944
- RAF Cottesmore (AAF-489), England, February 1944 – May 1945
- Pope Field, North Carolina, May 1945
- Baer Field, Indiana, 20 June 1945 – 15 July 1945
- Bellows Field, Hawaii Territory, 3 August 1945
- Wheeler Field, Hawaii Territory, 29 September 1945 – 25 March 1946
- Lake Charles (later Chennault) AFB, Louisiana, 20 April 1953 (deployed to Sidi Slimane Air Base, French Morocco, 12 April 1954 – 22 June 1954 and to Goose AB, Labrador, 21 February – 7 April and 28 October – 28 December 1955 and 28 June – 29 August 1956)
- Selfridge AFB, Michigan, 1 June 1960 – 15 December 1964
- Al-Udeid Air Base, Qatar, 2002 – Undetermined

=== Aircraft ===
- Douglas C-47 Skytrain, 1942–1945
- Curtiss C-46 Commando, 1945–1946
- Boeing KC-97 Stratofreighter, 1953–1964
- McDonnell Douglas KC-10 Extender, 2002-undetermined

=== Operations and decorations ===
- Combat Operations. Included airborne assaults on Sicily, Normandy, Holland, and Germany; aerial transportation of personnel (including casualties), supplies, and equipment in the Mediterranean Theater of Operations (MTO) and European Theater of Operations (ETO), Nov 1942 – Apr 1945.
- Campaigns. World War II: Egypt-Libya; Tunisia; Sicily; Naples-Foggia; Rome-Arno; Normandy; Northern France; Rhineland; Central Europe.
- Decorations. Distinguished Unit Citations: Egypt, Libya, Tunisia, Sicily, 25 November 1942 – 25 August 1943; Sicily, 11 July 1943; France, [6–7] Jun 1944.
