= 37th Airlift Squadron =

37th Airlift Squadron

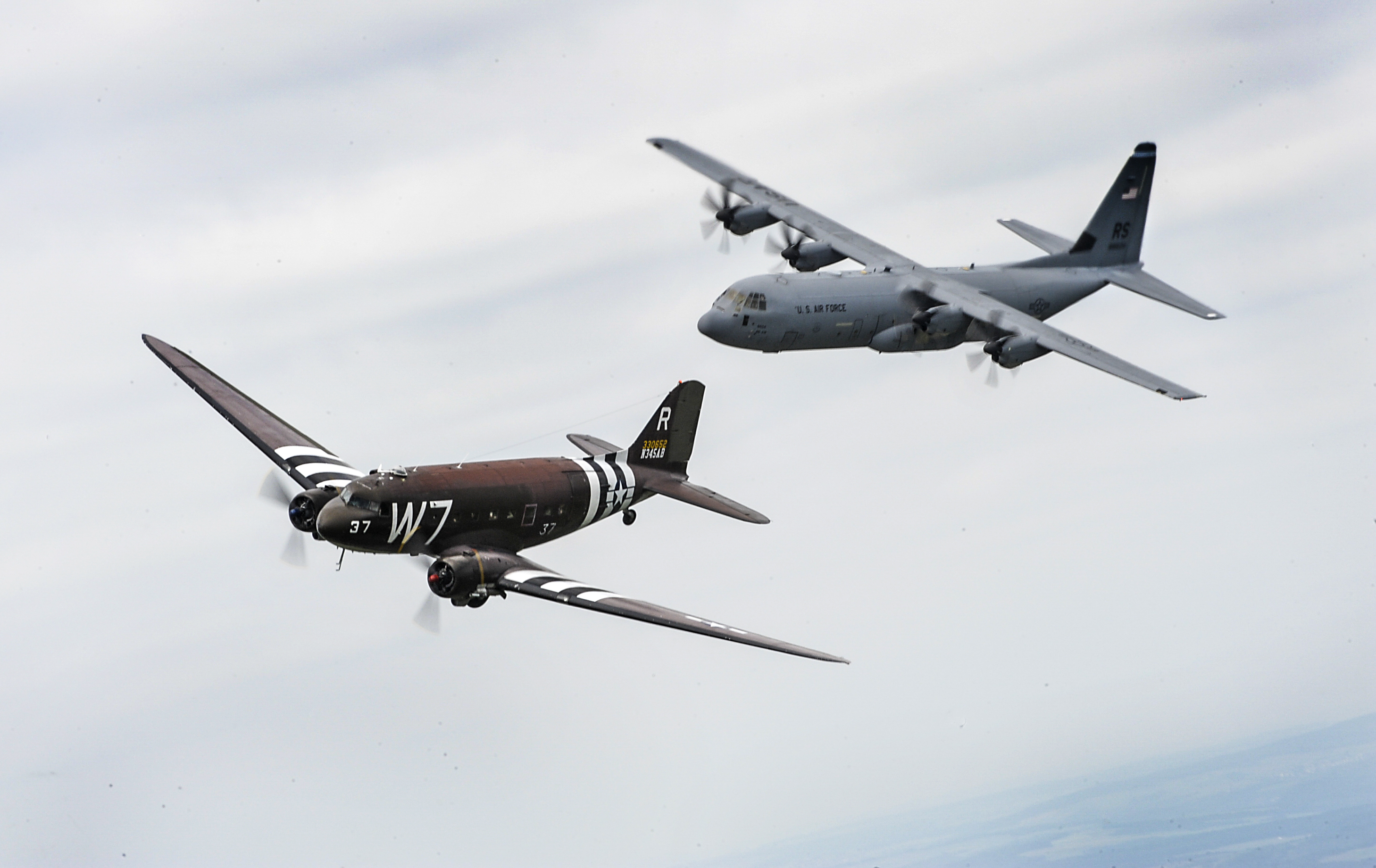
- 37th Airlift Squadron C-130J Super Hercules & legacy C-47 'W7' Skytrain conduct 70th anniversary Sainte-Mère-Église Normandy D-Day formation flight
- Active: 1942–1952; 1952–1957; 1966–present
- Country: United States
- Branch: United States Air Force
- Role: Airlift
- Part of: United States Air Forces in Europe – Air Forces Africa: Third Air Force; 86th Airlift Wing; 86th Operations Group
- Garrison/HQ: Ramstein Air Base, Germany
- Nickname: Blue Tail Flies
- Engagements: Operation Overlord; Operation Market Garden; Korean War; Battle of Pakchon; Operation Tomahawk; Persian Gulf War; Operation Provide Comfort; Operation Provide Promise; Operation Joint Endeavor; Kosovo War; Operation Joint Guard; Operation Joint Forge; Operation Iraqi Freedom
- Decorations: Distinguished Unit Citation; Air Force Outstanding Unit Award; Republic of Korea Presidential Unit Citation; Republic of Vietnam Gallantry Cross with Palm

Insignia
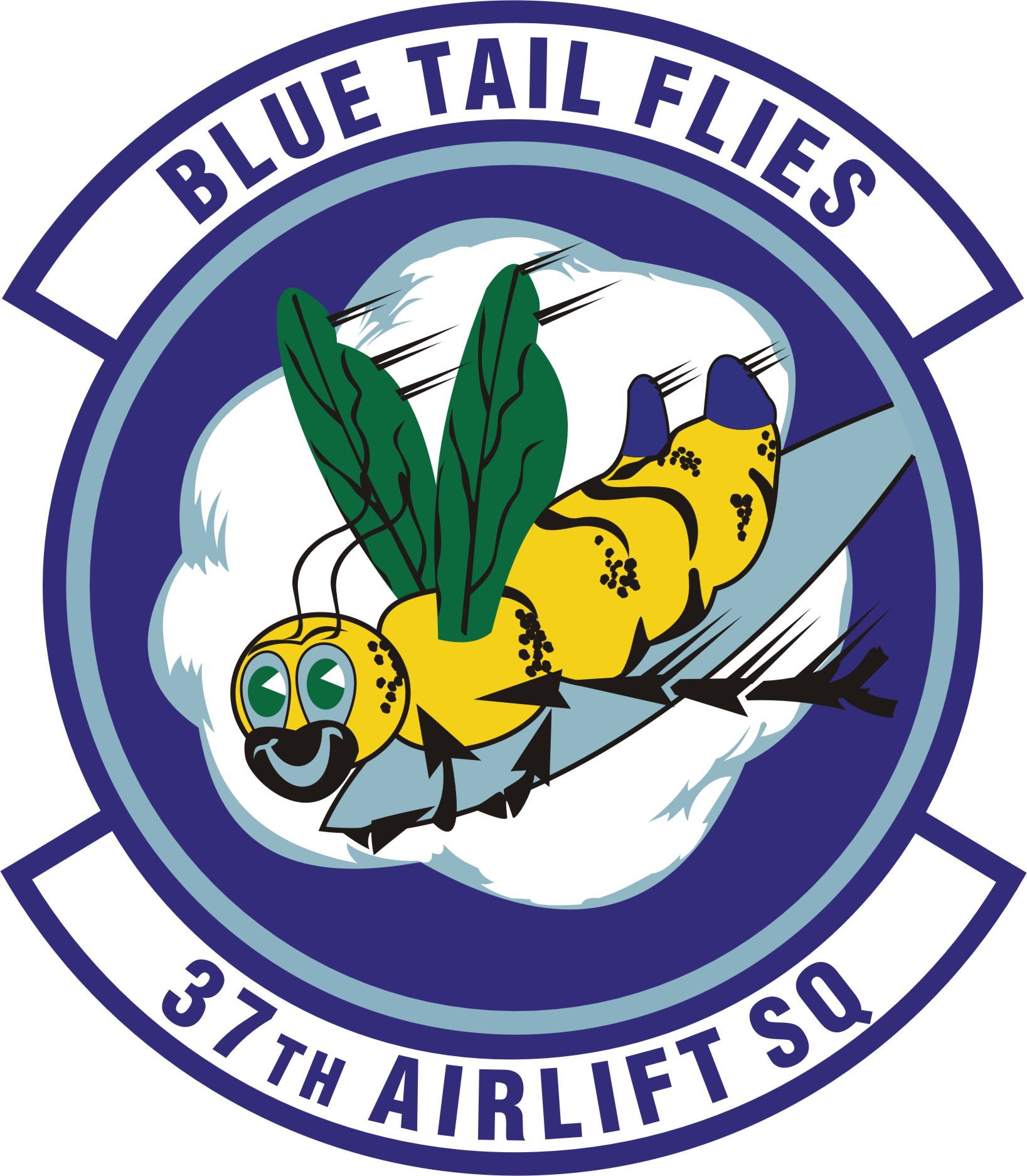
- 37th Airlift Squadron emblem (Approved, 14 Jun 2007)

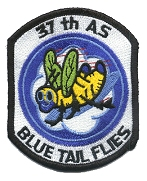
- 37th Airlift Squadron emblem (Ramstein AB 1994)

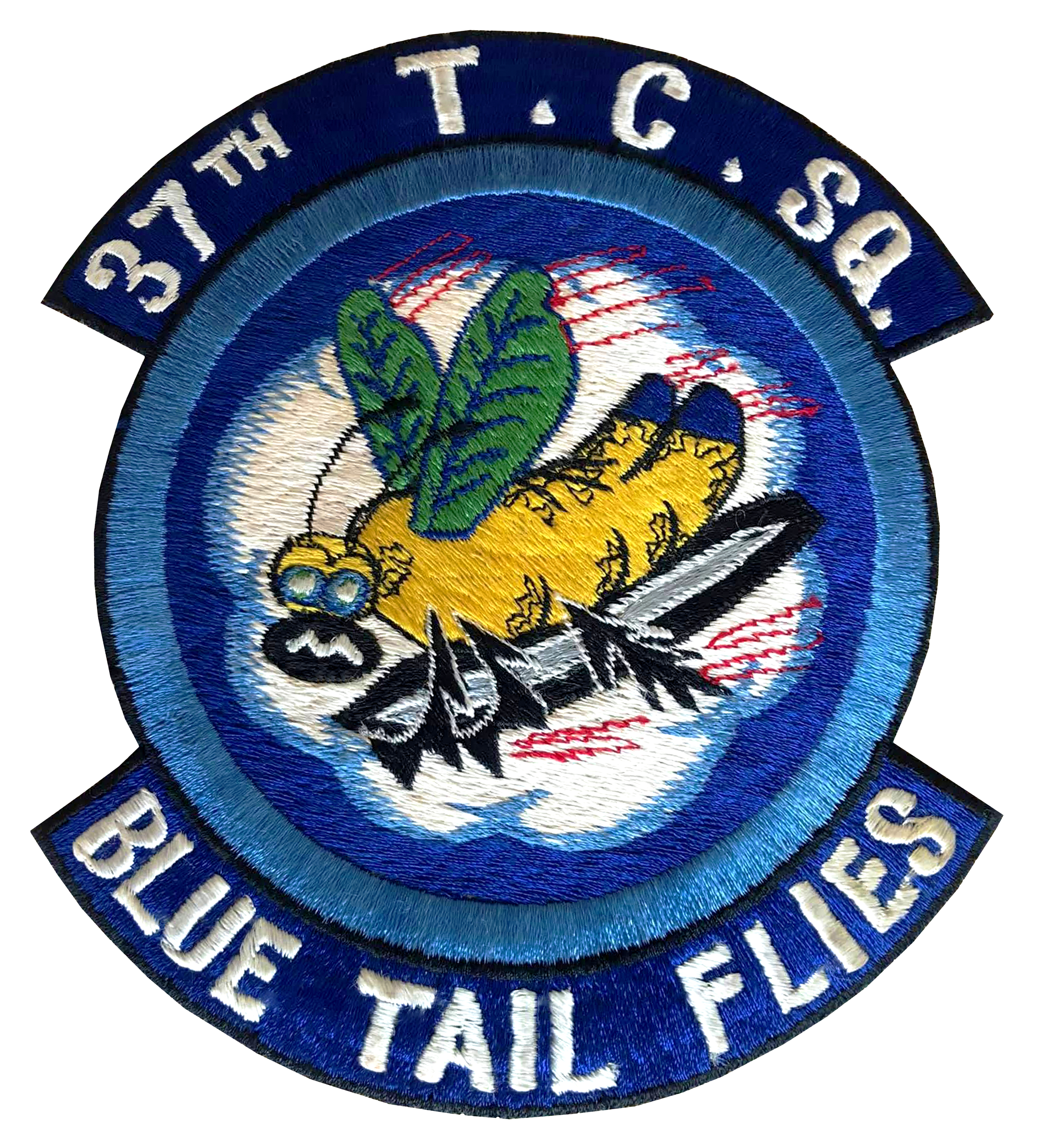
- 37th Troop Carrier Squadron, Medium emblem (Approved, 6 Jul 1951)

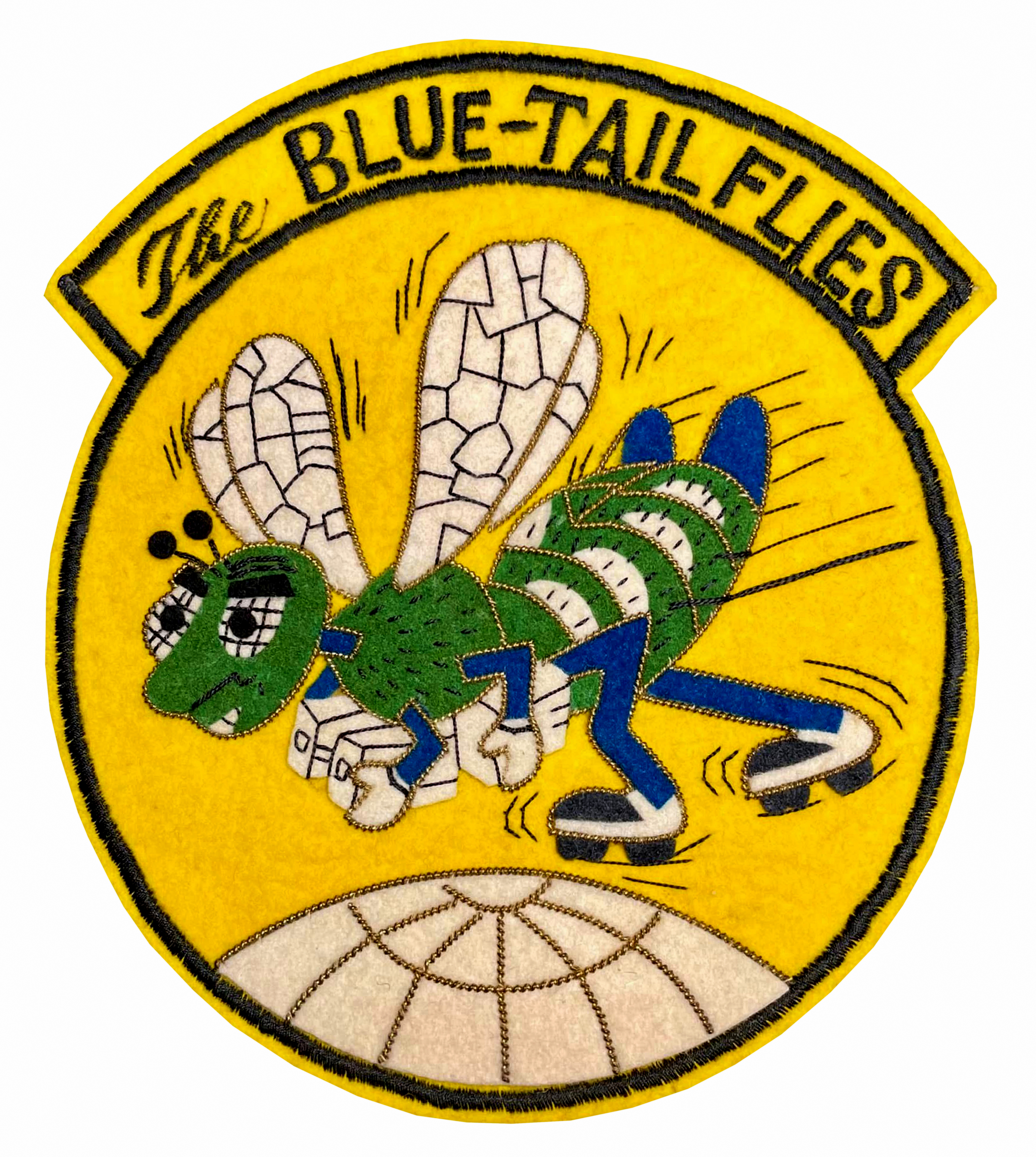
- 37th Troop Carrier Squadron, Medium emblem (Ashiya AB 1950)

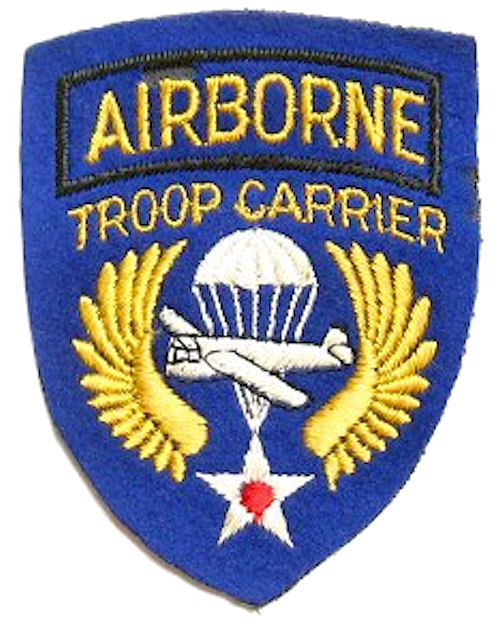
- 37th Troop Carrier Squadron emblem (D-Day WWII)

The 37th Airlift Squadron is a United States Air Force unit assigned to the 86th Airlift Wing at Ramstein Air Base, Germany. It operates Lockheed C-130J Super Hercules aircraft providing European intra-theater airlift.

== Mission ==
Conducts C-130J Super Hercules tactical airlift, airdrop and aeromedical evacuation operations primarily in Europe and Africa.

== History ==
=== World War II ===
Activated in June 1942 under I Troop Carrier Command at Patterson Field, Ohio. Trained at various stationed in the southeast and Texas with Douglas C-47 Skytrain transports. Deployed to Egypt in November 1942 as part of President Roosevelt's decision to aid the Royal Air Force Western Desert Air Force, assigned to the newly established Ninth Air Force, headquartered in Cairo.

Transported supplies and evacuated casualties in support of the British Eighth Army, operating from desert airfields in Egypt and Libya. Reassigned in May 1943 to the USAAF Twelfth Air Force in Algeria, supporting Fifth Army forces in the Tunisian Campaign. Began training for the invasion of Sicily; dropped paratroops over the assault area on the night of 9 July. Carried reinforcements to Sicily on 11 July and received a DUC for carrying out that mission although severely attacked by ground and naval forces; dropped paratroops over the beachhead south of the Sele River on the night of 14 September 1943. Remained in the Mediterranean Theater of Operations until February 1944 until being reassigned back to Ninth Air Force in England, IX Troop Carrier Command to participate in the buildup of forces prior to the Allied landings in France during D-Day in June 1944.

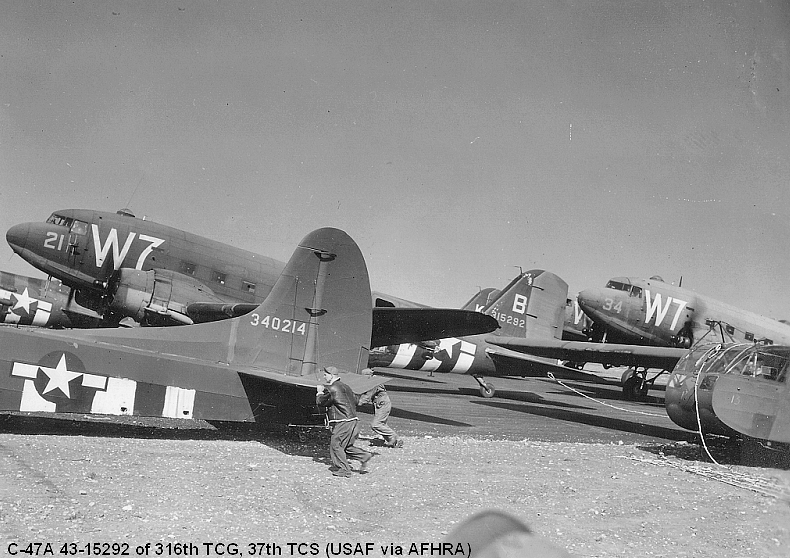
37th TCS C-47A's June 1944

Engaged in combat operations by dropping paratroops into Normandy near Sainte-Mère-Église on D-Day (6 June 1944) and releasing gliders with reinforcements on the following day. 37th TCS assigned C-47's during the D-Day operations utilized the W7 fuselage code. The unit received a third Distinguished Unit Citation and a French citation for these missions.

After the Normandy invasion the squadron ferried supplies in the United Kingdom. The squadron also hauled food, clothing, medicine, gasoline, ordnance equipment, and other supplies to the front lines and evacuated patients to rear zone hospitals. It dropped paratroops near Nijmegen and towed gliders carrying reinforcements during the airborne attack on the Netherlands.

=== Korean War ===
Returned to the United States in May 1945, becoming a domestic troop carrier squadron for Continental Air Forces flying the C-46 Commando and C-82 Packet.

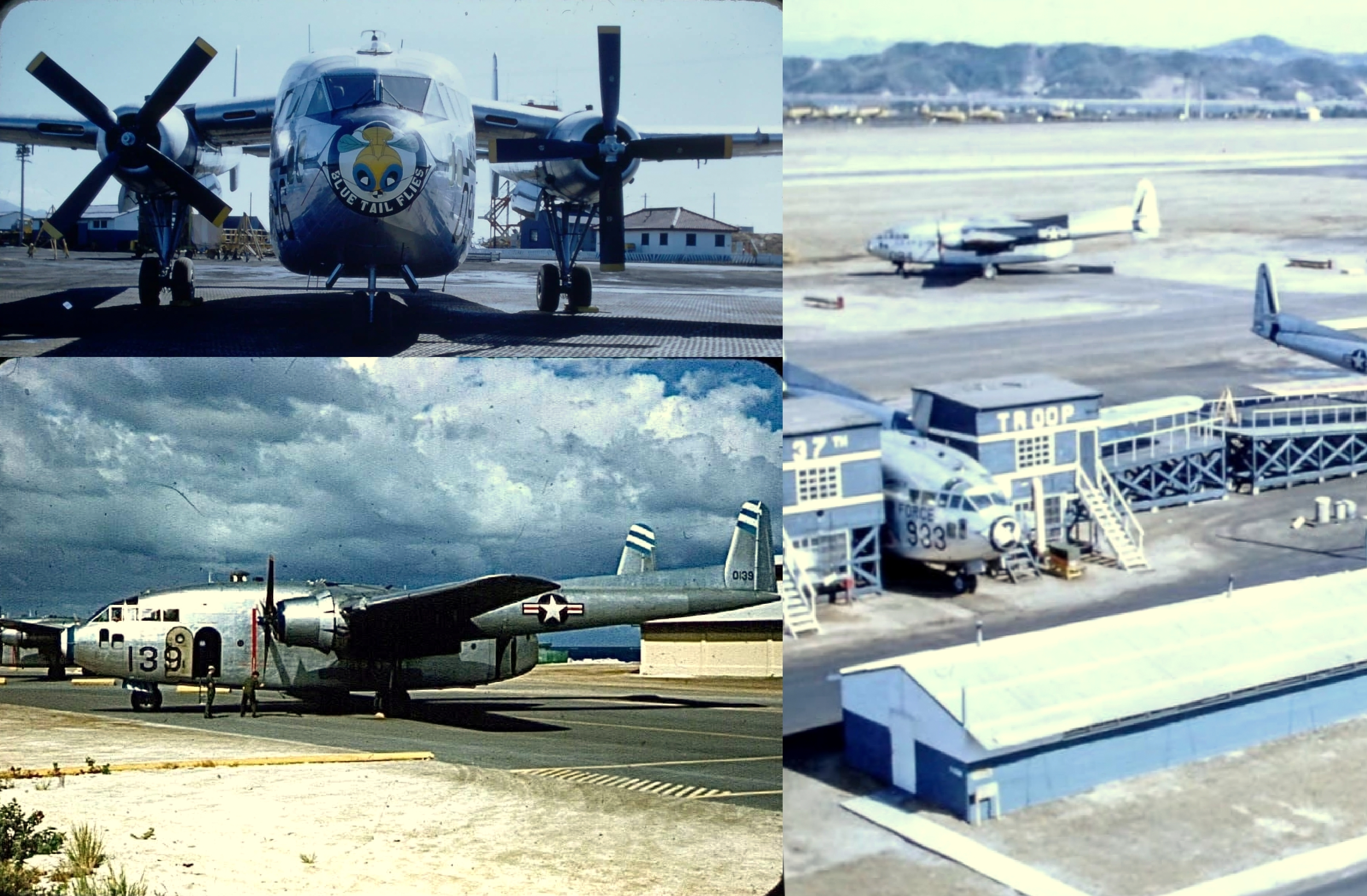
37th Troop Carrier Squadron C-119's Ashiya AB, Japan 1955

During and after the Korean War, the unit was based at Ashiya Air Base, Japan and equipped with the C-119 Flying Boxcar providing aerial transportation between Japan and Korea. During the height of the Korean War, the 37th TCS flew airborne assaults at Sukchon and Munsan-ni. The squadron was later inactivated in 1957.

=== Reactivation / Europe / Vietnam ===
The squadron was reactivated in October 1966 at Langley Air Force Base, Virginia and equipped with Lockheed C-130 Hercules tactical transports.

During the late 1960's, the 37th deployed repeatedly to RAF Mildenhall, England and Rhein-Main Air Base, Germany supporting ongoing European and Africa airlift requirements. Later, the squadron deployed to Ching Chuan Kang Air Base, Taiwan in 1972. Crews of the 37th flew to Hanoi on 17 February 1973 in support of Operation Homecoming, the repatriation of American prisoners of war to Clark Air Base, Philippines, on 5 March 1973. Unit formally reassigned to United States Air Forces in Europe and relocated to Rhein-Main Air Base Germany in October 1977. It conducted airlift operations during Operation Desert Shield in Southwest Asia, 14 August 1990 – 29 March 1991.

=== Kosovo / Bosnia-Herzegovina ===
Lead USAFE tactical squadron to airdrop humanitarian supplies supporting Operation Provide Comfort for the relief of fleeing Kurdish refugees in northern Iraq, April–May 1991. As primary EUCOM tactical airlift, the 37th AS led sustained Adverse Weather Aerial Delivery System (AWADS) airlift & airdrop missions to Bosnia and Herzegovina for Operation Provide Promise from July 1992 – January 1996. Continued primary airlift support with IFOR, SFOR, Kosovo Force (KFOR), Operations Joint Endeavor/Guard/Forge, 1996–2000. Airlifted troops & equipment throughout ETO, 1999 – present.

In November 2009, the 37th retired its last legacy C-130E and now solely operates the Lockheed C-130J Super Hercules model.

=== Campaigns and decorations ===
- Campaigns. World War II: Egypt-Libya; Tunisia; Naples-Foggia; Rome-Arno; Normandy; Northern France; Rhineland; Central Europe. Korea: UN Offensive with Arrowhead; CCF Intervention; First UN Counteroffensive with Arrowhead; CCF Spring Offensive; UN Summer-Fall Offensive; Second Korean Winter. Southwest Asia: Defense of Saudi Arabia; Liberation and Defense of Kuwait. Kosovo: Air Campaign.
- Decorations. Distinguished Unit Citations: Middle East, 25 November 1942 – 25 August 1943; France, [6–7] Jun 1944; Korea, 28 November-10 Dec 1950. Air Force Outstanding Unit Award with Combat "V" Device: 15 January 2004 – 31 October 2005. Air Force Outstanding Unit Awards: 1 May 1967 – 30 April 1969; 1 May 1970 – 30 April 1972; 1 May 1972 – 30 April 1974; 15 September 1975 – 30 April 1977; 1 July 1978 – 30 June 1980; 1 July 1981 – 30 June 1983; 1 July 1983 – 30 June 1985; 1 July 1985 – 30 June 1987; 1 July 1987 – 30 June 1989; 1 July 1989 – 30 June 1991; 1 July 1991 – 31 March 1992; 1 July 1993–[30 September 1994]; [1 October 1994]-30 June 1995; 1 July 1996 – 30 June 1997; 24 March-10 Jun 1999; 1 January 2000 – 31 December 2001; 1 January-31 Dec 2002; 1 November 2005 – 31 December 2006; 1 January-31 Dec 2007. Republic of Korea Presidential Unit Citation, 1 July 1951–[8 May 1952]. Republic of Vietnam Gallantry Cross with Palm: 1 October 1967 – 28 January 1973.

== Lineage ==
- Constituted as the 37th Transport Squadron on 2 February 1942

Activated on 14 February 1942
Redesignated 37th Troop Carrier Squadron on 4 July 1942
Redesignated 37th Troop Carrier Squadron, Medium on 23 June 1948
Redesignated 37th Troop Carrier Squadron, Heavy on 8 October 1949
Redesignated 37th Troop Carrier Squadron, Medium on 28 January 1950
Inactivated on 8 May 1952

- Activated on 8 May 1952

Inactivated on 18 June 1957

- Redesignated 37th Troop Carrier Squadron and activated on 17 May 1966 (not organized)

Organized on 1 October 1966
Redesignated 37th Tactical Airlift Squadron on 1 May 1967
Redesignated 37th Airlift Squadron on 1 April 1992

=== Assignments ===
- 316th Transport Group (later 316th Troop Carrier Group), 14 February 1942 – 8 May 1952 (attached to 314th Troop Carrier Group after 21 August 1950)
- 316th Troop Carrier Group, 8 May 1952 – 18 June 1957
- Tactical Air Command, 17 May 1966 (not organized)
- 316th Troop Carrier Wing (later 316th Tactical Airlift Wing), 1 October 1966
- 317th Tactical Airlift Wing, 15 September 1975
- 435th Tactical Airlift Wing, 1 October 1977
- 435th Tactical Airlift Group, 15 December 1978
- 435th Tactical Airlift Wing, 1 June 1980
- 435th Operations Group, 1 April 1992
- 86th Operations Group, 1 October 1994 – present

=== Stations ===
- Patterson Field, Ohio, 15 June 1942
- Bowman Field, Kentucky, 16 June 1942
- Lawson Field, Georgia, 9 August 1942
- Del Valle Army Air Base, Texas, 29 September-10 Nov 1942
- RAF Deversoir, Egypt, 23 November 1942
- RAF El Adem, Egypt, 10 December 1942
- RAF Fayid, Egypt, Jan 1943
- Nouvion Airfield, Algeria, 10 May 1943
- Guercif Airfield, French Morocco, 28 May 1943
- Enfidaville Airfield, Tunisia, 24 June 1943
- Mazzara Airfield, Sicily, Italy, 1 September 1943
- Borizzo Airfield, Sicily, Italy, 18 October 1943 – 16 February 1944
- RAF Cottesmore (AAF-489), England, 18 February 1944 – 10 May 1945
- Pope Field, North Carolina, c. 10 June 1945
- Greenville Army Air Base (later Greenville Air Force Base), South Carolina, 30 July 1946
- Smyrna Air Force Base (later Sewart Air Force Base), Tennessee, 4 November 1949 – 4 September 1950
- Ashiya Air Base, Japan, c. 11 September 1950

- Komaki Air Base, Japan, 29 November 1950 (operated from Ashiya Air Base, Japan)
- Ashiya Air Base, Japan, 11 February-8 May 1952
- Sewart Air Force Base, Tennessee, 8 May 1952 – 15 November 1954
- Ashiya Air Base, Japan, 15 November 1954 – 18 June 1957
- Langley Air Force Base, Virginia, 1 October 1966 – 30 September 1977

Deployed to RAF Mildenhall, England, 24 November 1968 – 26 February 1969; Rhein-Main Air Base, Germany, 13 July-26 September 1969; RAF Mildenhall, England, 24 February-11 May 1970; Rhein-Main Air Base, Germany, 7 February-13 Apr 1971; RAF Mildenhall, England, 13 January-14 March 1972; Ching Chuan Kang Air Base, Taiwan, 6 December 1972 – 15 March 1973; RAF Mildenhall, England, 31 August-c. 1 October 1973; Rhein-Main Air Base, Germany, 5 April-15 June 1975

- Rhein-Main Air Base, Germany, 1 October 1977
- Ramstein Air Base, Germany, 1 October 1994 – present

=== Aircraft ===
- Douglas C-47 Skytrain (1942–1947)
- Consolidated C-109 Liberator Express (1944–1945)
- Curtiss C-46 Commando (1946–1947)
- Fairchild C-82 Packet (1947–1950)

- Fairchild C-119 Flying Boxcar (1950–1957)
- Lockheed C-130E Hercules (1966–2010)
- Lockheed C-130J Super Hercules (2009–present)
