= 45th Airlift Squadron =

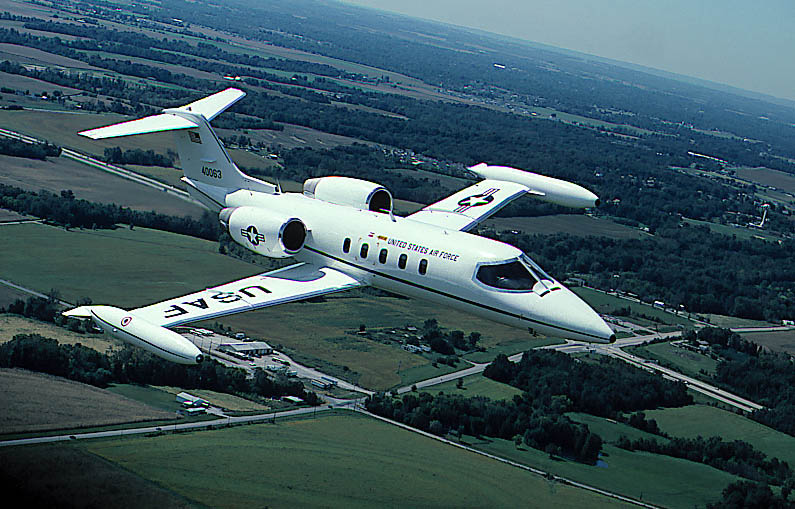
- Learjet C-21 as flown by the squadron
- Active: 1942–1945; 1993–1993; 1994–2011
- Country: United States
- Branch: United States Air Force
- Role: Airlift
- Part of: Air Education and Training Command
- Garrison/HQ: Keesler Air Force Base
- Engagements: Mediterranean Theater of Operations; European Theater of Operations
- Decorations: Distinguished Unit Citation; Air Force Outstanding Unit Award

Insignia
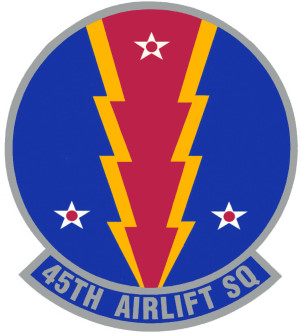
- 45th Airlift Squadron emblem (approved 5 June 1995)

The 45th Airlift Squadron is an inactive unit of the 314th Airlift Wing and served as a Geographically Separate Unit garrisoned at Keesler Air Force Base, Mississippi. It operated the Learjet C-21 aircraft training pilots for executive airlift.

== History ==
=== World War II ===
Activated in June 1942 under Air Transport Command, it was formed at Patterson Field, Ohio. It trained at various stations in the southeast and Texas with Douglas C-47 Skytrain transports. It was deployed to Egypt in November 1942 as part of President Roosevelt's decision to aid the Royal Air Force Western Desert Air Force, and was assigned to the newly established Ninth Air Force, headquartered in Cairo.

Transported supplies and evacuated casualties in support of the British Eighth Army, operating from desert airfields in Egypt and Libya. Reassigned in May 1943 to Twelfth Air Force in Algeria, supporting Fifth Army forces in the Tunisian Campaign. Began training for the invasion of Sicily; dropped paratroops over the assault area on the night of 9 July 1943. Carried reinforcements to Sicily on 11 July and received a Distinguished Unit Citation for carrying out that mission although severely attacked by ground and naval forces; dropped paratroops over the beachhead south of the Sele River on the night of 14 September 1943. Remained in the Mediterranean Theater of Operations until February 1944 until becoming part of IX Troop Carrier Command in England to participate in the buildup of forces prior to the Allied landings in France during D-Day in June 1944.

Engaged in combat operations by dropping paratroops into Normandy near Ste-Mere-Eglise on D-Day, 6 June 1944, and releasing gliders with reinforcements on the following day. The unit received a third Distinguished Unit Citation and a French citation for these missions.

After the Normandy invasion the squadron ferried supplies in the United Kingdom. The squadron also hauled food, clothing, medicine, gasoline, ordnance equipment, and other supplies to the front lines and evacuated patients to rear zone hospitals. It dropped paratroops near Nijmegen and towed gliders carrying reinforcements during the Operation Market Garden, the airborne attack on the Netherlands. In December, it participated in the Battle of the Bulge by releasing gliders with supplies for the 101st Airborne Division near Bastogne.

Returned to the United States in May 1945, becoming a domestic troop carrier squadron for Continental Air Forces. Reassigned to Seventh Air Force in Hawaii in September 1945, operating until being inactivated at the end of the year.

=== Operational support airlift ===
Reactivating briefly in 1993, and again in 1994 under AETC it has trained pilots in operational support airlift missions for VIP personnel using Lear C-21 executive aircraft.

On July 14, 2011, the 45th AS was inactivated.

=== Campaigns and decorations ===
- Campaigns. World War II: Egypt-Libya; Tunisia; Sicily; Naples-Foggia; Rome-Arno; Normandy; Northern France; Rhineland; Central Europe.
- Decorations. Distinguished Unit Citations: Egypt, Libya, Tunisia, Sicily, 25 Nov 1942 – 25 Aug 1943; Sicily, 11 July 1943; France, [6–7] Jun 1944. Air Force Outstanding Unit Awards: 1 Jul 1996 – 30 Jun 1998; 1 Jul 1999 – 30 Jun 2001; 1 Jul 2001 – 30 Jun 2003; 1 Jul 2003 – 30 Jun 2004; 1 Jul 2005 – 30 Jun 2006; 1 Jul 2006 – 30 Jun 2007; 1 Jul 2008 – 30 Jun 2009.

== Lineage ==
- Constituted as the 45th Transport Squadron on 30 May 1942

Activated on 15 June 1942
Redesignated 45th Troop Carrier Squadron on 4 July 1942
Inactivated on 26 December 1945

- Redesignated 45th Airlift Flight on 1 April 1993

Activated on 1 May 1993
Inactivated on 1 October 1993

- Redesignated 45th Airlift Squadron on 21 March 1994

Activated on 1 July 1994

- Redesignated 45th Airlift Flight on 1 October 1999
- Redesignated 45th Airlift Squadron on 9 July 2001

Inactivated on 14 July 2011

=== Assignments ===
- 316th Transport Group (later 316th Troop Carrier Group), 15 June 1942
- I Troop Carrier Command, May–26 December 1945 (attached to VI Air Service Area Command, 9 September–c. 20 December 1945)
- 2d Operations Group, 1 May–1 October 1993
- 81st Training Group, 1 July 1994
- 314th Operations Group, 1 October 1999 – present

=== Stations ===
- Patterson Field, Ohio, 15 June 1942
- Bowman Field, Kentucky, 20 June 1942
- Lawson Field, Georgia, 9 August 1942
- Del Valle Army Air Base, Texas, 29 September–10 November 1942
- RAF Deversoir, Egypt, 23 November 1942
- RAF El Adem, Egypt, 10 December 1942
- RAF Fayid, Egypt, January 1943
- Nouvion Airfield, Algeria, 24 May 1943
- Guercif Airfield, French Morocco, 28 May 1943
- Enfidaville Airfield, Tunisia, 21 June 1943
- Mazzara Airfield, Sicily, Italy, 1 September 1943
- Borizzo Airfield, Sicily, Italy, 18 October 1943 – 12 February 1944
- RAF Cottesmore (AAF-489), England, 15 February 1944 – May 1945
- Pope Field, North Carolina, May 1945
- Baer Field, Indiana, 20 June–15 August 1945
- Kipapa Airfield, Hawaii, 9 September 1945
- Wheeler Field, Hawaii, 29 September–20 December 1945
- Camp Anza, California, 26 December 1945
- Barksdale Air Force Base, Louisiana, 1 May–1 October 1993
- Keesler Air Force Base, Mississippi, 1 July 1994 – 14 July 2011

=== Aircraft ===
- Douglas C-47 Skytrain (1942–1945)
- Curtiss C-46 Commando (1945)
- Beechcraft C-12 Huron (1994–1999)
- Learjet C-21 (1994 – 2011)
