= 36th Airlift Squadron =

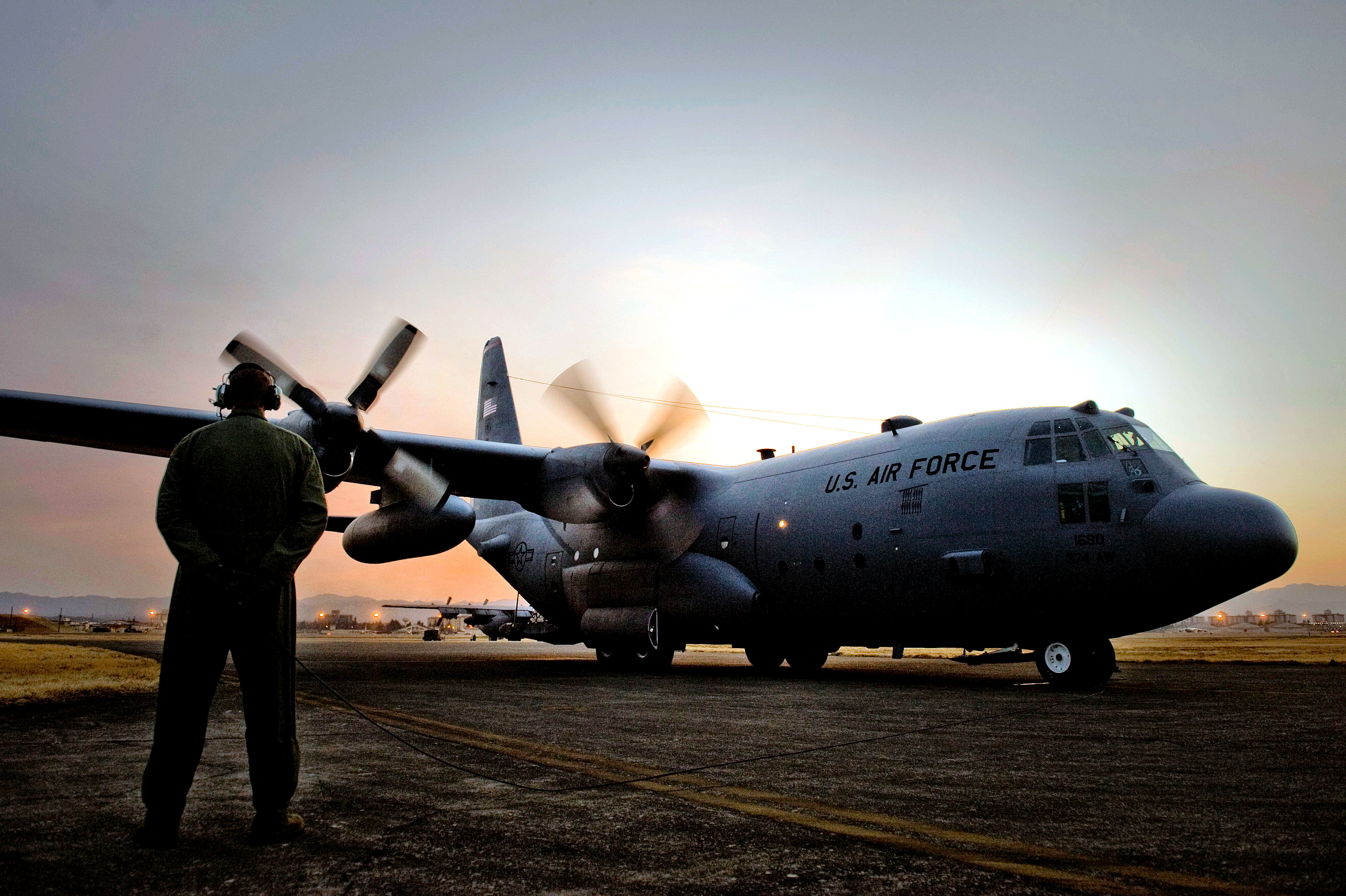
- A Lockheed C-130 Hercules of the 36th Airlift Squadron at engine start up
- Active: 1942–1957; 1966–1968; 1968–present
- Country: United States
- Branch: United States Air Force
- Role: Airlift
- Part of: Pacific Air Forces
- Garrison/HQ: Yokota Air Base
- Nickname: Eagle Airlifters
- Engagements: Mediterranean Theater of Operations
- Decorations: Distinguished Unit Citation; Air Force Outstanding Unit Award; Republic of Vietnam Gallantry Cross with Palm; Philippine Presidential Unit Citation

Commanders
- Notable commanders: Norton A. Schwartz

Insignia
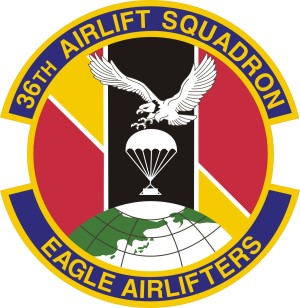
- 36th Airlift Squadron Emblem (approved 24 August 1995)

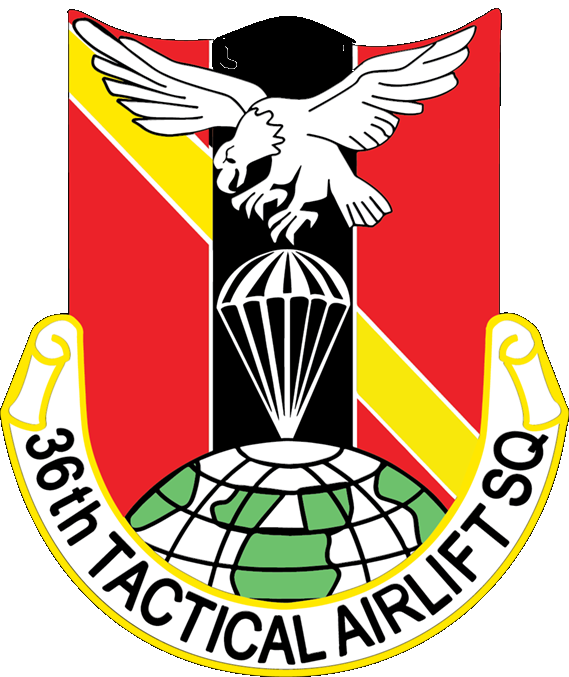
- 36th Troop Carrier Squadron emblem (approved 18 July 1952)

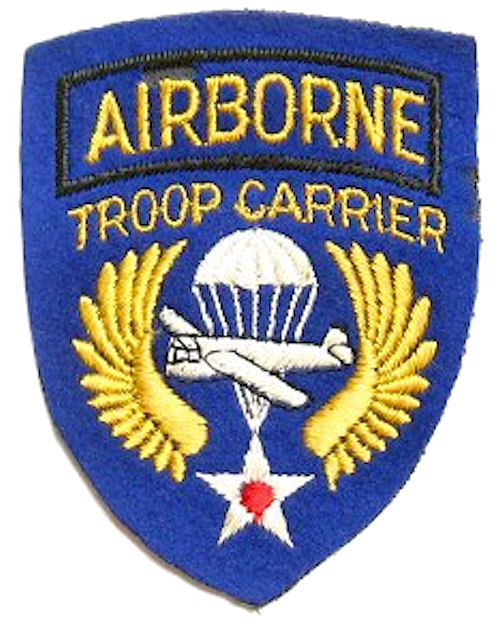
- 36th Troop Carrier Squadron emblem (D-Day WWII)

The 36th Airlift Squadron is an airlift squadron of the United States Air Force. It is part of the 374th Operations Group (374th Airlift Wing) at Yokota Air Base, Japan.

It is the only forward-based tactical airlift squadron in the United States Indo-Pacific Command Area of Responsibility. Formerly an Air Mobility Command unit, and a Military Airlift Command and Tactical Air Command unit before that, the squadron is now part of Pacific Air Forces. It provides responsive movement of personnel and equipment through aerial delivery and assault airland operations. It maintains Lockheed C-130J Super Hercules mission-ready aircrew and aircraft to conduct theater airlift, special operations, aeromedical evacuation, search and rescue, repatriation and humanitarian relief missions.

== History ==
=== World War II ===
Activated in February 1942 at Patterson Field, Ohio as the 36th Transport Squadron and redesignated 36th Troop Carrier Squadron five months later. Trained at various stations in the southeast and Texas with Douglas C-47 Skytrain transports. Deployed to Egypt in November 1942 as part of President Roosevelt's decision to aid the Royal Air Force Western Desert Air Force, assigned to the newly established Ninth Air Force, headquartered in Cairo.

Transported supplies and evacuated casualties in support of the British Eighth Army, operating from desert airfields in Egypt and Libya. Reassigned in May 1943 to Twelfth Air Force in Algeria, supporting Fifth Army forces in the Tunisian Campaign. Began training for the invasion of Sicily; dropped paratroops over the assault area on the night of 9 July. Carried reinforcements to Sicily on 11 July and received a Distinguished Unit Citation for carrying out that mission although severely attacked by ground and naval forces; dropped paratroops over the beachhead south of the Sele River on the night of 14 September 1943. Remained in the Mediterranean Theater of Operations until February 1944 until being reassigned back to IX Troop Carrier Command to participate in the buildup of forces prior to the Allied landings in France during D-Day in June 1944.

Engaged in combat operations by dropping paratroops into Normandy near Ste-Mere-Eglise on D-Day (6 June 1944) and releasing gliders with reinforcements on the following day. 36th TCS assigned C-47's during the D-Day operations utilized the 6E fuselage code. The unit received a third Distinguished Unit Citation for these missions.

After the Normandy invasion the squadron ferried supplies in the United Kingdom. The squadron also hauled food, clothing, medicine, gasoline, ordnance equipment, and other supplies to the front lines and evacuated patients to rear zone hospitals. It dropped paratroops near Nijmegen and towed gliders carrying reinforcements during the Operation Market Garden, the |airborne attack on the Netherlands. In December, it participated in the Battle of the Bulge by releasing gliders with supplies for the 101st Airborne Division near Bastogne.

=== Korean War ===
Returned to the United States in May 1945, becoming a domestic troop carrier squadron for Continental Air Forces. In the Korean War the squadron flew airborne assaults at Sukchon and Munsan-ni and aerial transportation between Japan and Korea. Returned to the United States in 1952, however redeployed back to Japan in 1954 and performed theater airlift missions. Inactivated in 1957 as part of the draw down of occupation forces in Japan.

=== Airlift from the United States ===
Reactivated in 1966 at Langley Air Force Base, Virginia as a Tactical Air Command troop carrier squadron under the 316th Troop Carrier Wing with Lockheed C-130E Hercules aircraft. Redesignated as the 36th Tactical Airlift Squadron in 1967 concurrent with parent wing's redesignation as the 316th Tactical Airlift Wing. Deployed frequently to NATO and U.S. Air Forces in Europe, sending aircraft to both England and West Germany.

In early 1975, the unit transferred from Tactical Air Command to Military Airlift Command (MAC). When Langley became the first operational mcDonnell Douglas F-15 Eagle base in the Air Force for the 1st Fighter Wing in 1975, the 316th Tactical Airlift Wing and two of its three airlift squadrons were inactivated. As the sole surviving airlift squadron, the 36th, moved to McChord Air Force Base, Washington where it operated C-130Es under MAC's 62d Military Airlift Wing (62 MAW), both within the United States and during rotational deployment of aircraft and crews to Howard Air Force Base, Panama in support Operation Coronet Oak, providing airlift support for United States Southern Command throughout Central and South America. It also participated and supported the ground troops during Operation Urgent Fury in Grenada from October to November 1983, and Operation Just Cause in Panama from December 1989 to January 1990.

=== Pacific Operations ===
In 1989, the squadron transitioned from the C-130E to the Lockheed C-141B Starlifter, flying that aircraft until 1993. In 1993, the squadron transitioned back to the C-130, this time the C-130H, and moved from McChord back to Japan, this time to Yokota Air Base, where it continues to perform its current theater airlift mission.

The squadron took part in Operation Tomodachi, the response by the USAF to the 2011 Tōhoku earthquake and tsunami, flying relief supplies to Sendai Airport, and in 2013 deployed aircraft to the Philippines for relief missions following Typhoon Haiyan. It began re-equipping with the Lockheed Martin C-130J Super Hercules late in 2016. It will receive 14 C-130Js in all. The final C-130H departed Yokota for the last time on 16 October 2017.

The squadron made its C-130J debut at Operation Christmas Drop 2017 continuing through Red Flag – Alaska in June 2018.

=== Decorations and Campaigns ===
- Campaigns. World War II: Egypt-Libya; Tunisia; Sicily; Naples-Foggia; Rome-Arno; Normandy; Northern France; Rhineland; Central Europe.
- Decorations. Distinguished Unit Citations: Egypt, Libya, Tunisia, Sicily, 25 November 1942 – 25 August 1943; Sicily, 11 July 1943; France, [6–7] Jun 1944. Air Force Outstanding Unit Awards: 1 March-2 Jul 1967; 3 July 1967-25 March 1968 and 5 July 1968 – 30 April 1969; 1 May 1970 – 30 April 1972; 20–29 September 1970; 1 May 1972 – 30 April 1974; 10 October 1975 – 9 October 1977; 1 July 1981 – 30 June 1983; 1 July 1983 – 30 June 1985; 14 June-3 Jul 1991; 1 October 1993 – 1 October 1994; 1 October 2000 – 30 September 2002; 1 October 2003 – 30 September 2005. Republic of Vietnam Gallantry Cross with Palm: 1 October 1967 – 30 August 1972. Philippine Republic Presidential Unit Citation: 21 July-15 Aug 1972.

== Lineage ==
- Constituted as the 36th Transport Squadron on 2 February 1942

Activated on 14 February 1942
Redesignated 36th Troop Carrier Squadron on 4 July 1942
Redesignated 36th Troop Carrier Squadron, Medium on 23 June 1948
Redesignated 36th Troop Carrier Squadron, Heavy on 8 October 1949
Redesignated 36th Troop Carrier Squadron, Medium on 28 January 1950
Inactivated on 18 June 1957

- Redesignated 36th Troop Carrier Squadron, and activated on 15 November 1965 (not organized)

Organized on 1 April 1966
Redesignated 36th Tactical Airlift Squadron on 1 May 1967
Discontinued and inactivated, on 25 March 1968

- Activated on 1 July 1968 (not organized)

Organized on 5 July 1968
Redesignated 36th Military Airlift Squadron on 1 October 1989
Redesignated 36th Airlift Squadron on 1 December 1991

=== Assignments ===
- 316th Transport Group (later 316th Troop Carrier Group), 14 February 1942 – 18 June 1957
- Tactical Air Command, 15 November 1965 (not organized)
- 316th Troop Carrier Wing (later 316th Tactical Airlift Wing), 1 April 1966 – 25 March 1968 (attached to 513th Tactical Airlift Wing, 21 March 1967 – 29 June 1967; 439th Military Airlift Group, 17 August 1967 – 17 September 1967)
- Tactical Air Command, 1 July 1968 (not organized)
- 316th Tactical Airlift Wing, 5 July 1968 (attached to 513th Tactical Airlift Wing, 24 February – 19 June 1969; 7310th Tactical Airlift Wing, 24 November 1969 – 31 December 1969; 322d Tactical Airlift Wing, 1 January 1970 – 7 February 1970 and 13 August 1970 – 21 October 1970; 513th Tactical Airlift Wing, 2 July 1971 – 16 September 1971; United States Air Forces in Europe, 28 September 1971 – 31 October 1971; 374th Tactical Airlift Wing, 14 May 1972 – c. 7 September 1972; 513th Tactical Airlift Wing, 5 March 1973 – 18 May 1973 and 15 January 1974 – 16 March 1974; 322d Tactical Airlift Wing, 1 July 1974 – 16 October 1974)
- 62d Military Airlift Wing, 1 July 1975
- 62d Operations Group, 1 December 1991
- 374th Operations Group, 1 October 1993 – present

=== Stations ===
- Patterson Field, Ohio, 15 June 1942
- Bowman Field, Kentucky, 16 June 1942
- Lawson Field, Georgia, 9 August 1942
- Del Valle Army Air Base, Texas, 29 September 1942 – 10 November 1942
- RAF Deversoir, Egypt, 23 November 1942
- RAF El Adem, Egypt, 10 December 1942
- RAF Fayid, Egypt, January 1943
- Nouvion Airfield, Algeria, 10 May 1943
- Guercif Airfield, French Morocco, 28 May 1943
- Enfidaville Airfield, Tunisia, 24 June 1943
- Mazzara Airfield, Sicily, Italy, 1 September 1943
- Borizzo Airfield, Sicily, Italy 18 October 1943 – 16 February 1944
- RAF Cottesmore (AAF-489), England, Feb 1944 – May 1945
- Pope Field, North Carolina, May 1945
- Greenville Army Air Base (later Greenville Air Force Base), South Carolina, 30 July 1946
- Smyrna Air Force Base (later Sewart Air Force Base), Tennessee, 4 November 1949 – 4 September 1950
- Ashiya Air Base, Japan, c. 11 September 1950
- Komaki Air Base, Japan (operated from Ashiya Air Base after 29 November 1950)
- Ashiya Air Base, Japan, 11 February 1952
- Sewart Air Force Base, Tennessee, 8 May 1952
- Ashiya Air Base, Japan, 15 November 1954 – 18 June 1957
- Langley Air Force Base, Virginia, 1 April 1966 – 25 March 1968

Deployed at RAF Mildenhall, England, 21 March-29 Jun 1967
Deployed at Rhein-Main Air Base, West Germany, 17 August-17 Sep 1967

- Langley AFB, Virginia, 5 July 1968

Deployed at RAF Mildenhall, England, 24 February 1969 – 19 June 1969
Deployed at Rhein-Main Air Base, West Germany, 24 November 1969 – 7 February 1970 and 13 August 1970 – 21 October 1970
Deployed at RAF Mildenhall, England, 2 July 1971 – 16 September 1971
Deployed at Wiesbaden Air Base, West Germany, 28 September 1971 – 31 October 1971
Deployed at Ching Chuan Kang Air Base, Taiwan, 14 May 1972 – c. 7 September 1972
Deployed at RAF Mildenhall, England, 5 March 1973 – 18 May 1973 and 15 January 1974 – 16 March 1974
Deployed at Rhein-Main Air Base, West Germany, 1 July 1974 – 16 October 1974

- McChord Air Force Base, Washington, 1 July 1975 – 1 October 1993
- Yokota Air Base, Japan, 1 October 1993 – present

=== Aircraft ===
- Douglas C-47 Skytrain (1942–1946)
- Fairchild C-82 Packet (1946–1950)
- Fairchild C-119 Flying Boxcar (1950–1957)
- Lockheed C-130E Hercules (1966–1989)
- Lockheed C-141B Starlifter (1989–1993)
- Lockheed C-130H Hercules (1993–2017)
- Lockheed C-130J Super Hercules (2017–present)
