= Tri-National Tornado Training Establishment =

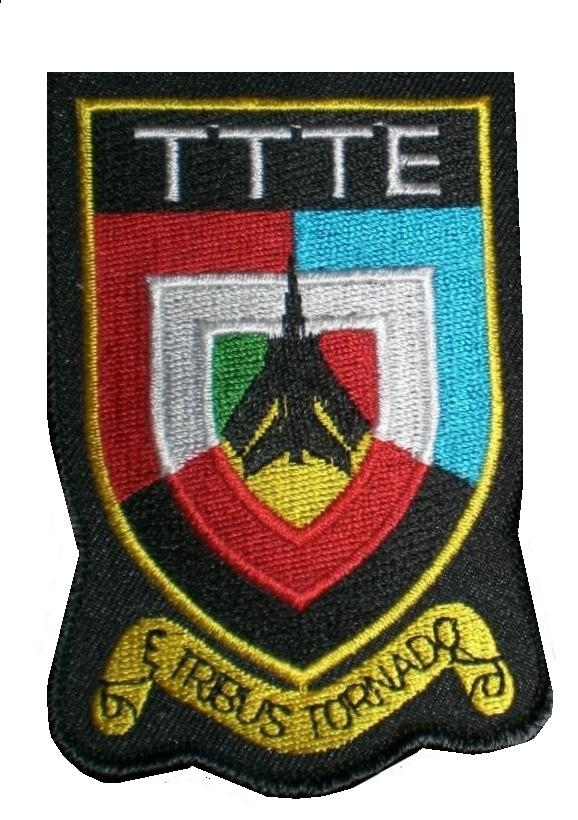
- Badge of TTTE
- Founded: 29 January 1981; 45 years ago
- Disbanded: 31 March 1999
- Countries: United Kingdom; Germany; Italy
- Branch: Royal Air Force; German Air Force; German Navy; Italian Air Force
- Type: Multinational flying training school
- Role: Panavia Tornado aircrew training
- Size: 48 aircraft 1,600 military and 130 civilian personnel
- Home station: RAF Cottesmore, Rutland, England
- Nickname: 'Triple T E'
- Mottos: E Tribus Tornado (Latin for 'Out of the tribe of the tornado')
- Aircraft: Panavia Tornado IDS

The Tri-National Tornado Training Establishment (TTTE) was a multinational air unit based at RAF Cottesmore in Rutland, England, from 1981 to 1999. It performed training on the Panavia Tornado for the Royal Air Force (RAF), Luftwaffe, Marineflieger and Italian Air Force. Initially, pilots received four weeks of training on the ground, followed by nine weeks in the air.

== History ==
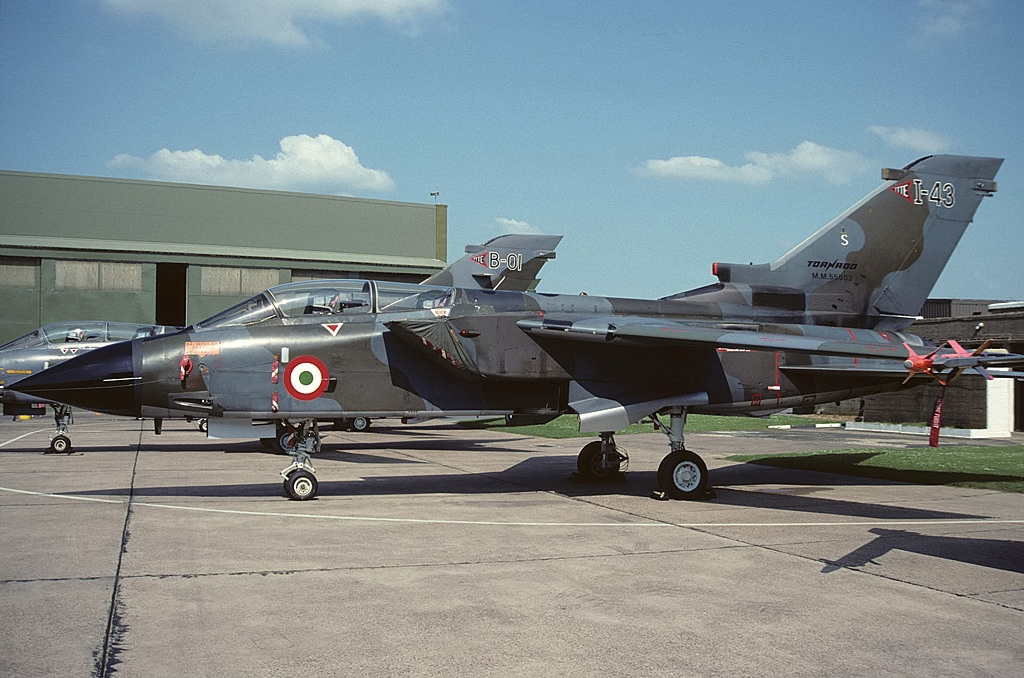
An Italian Air Force Tornado IDS belonging to the TTTE

The Tornado was first shown to the British public on 14 August 1978 at RAF Boscombe Down. The RAF planned to buy 220 of them, and 165 of the ADV variant. 809 for all three countries had been ordered, with 212 for the German Air Force, 112 for the German Navy and 100 for the Italian Air Force. Cost at that time was £7.8 million (equivalent to £42,627,000 in 2025) for the GR1, and £9.4 million (equivalent to £51,371,000 in 2025) for the ADV. As a historical comparison, a Tornado could carry twice the bomb load of an Avro Lancaster. It was chosen above contemporary American aircraft at that time because the General Dynamics F-16 Fighting Falcon lacked all-weather capability, the McDonnell Douglas F-15 Eagle had inferior radar and electronic countermeasures and the Grumman F-14 Tomcat was too expensive. The Tornado was the first RAF aircraft with an active scanning Terrain Following Radar (TFR). The Marineflieger was the first to receive their aircraft. When the TTTE was established, the RAF was concerned it may not have enough trained pilots to fly the aircraft, due to poor recruitment and perceived low pay.

=== Formation ===
The memorandum of understanding establishing the unit was signed in 1979 by the United Kingdom, Germany and Italy and the unit came into existence on 29 January 1981 with Sir Michael Beetham in attendance. The first RAF Tornados arrived at the base on 1 July 1980; Luftwaffe Tornados arrived on 2 September 1980; and Italian Tornados arrived much later on 5 April 1982.

== Structure ==
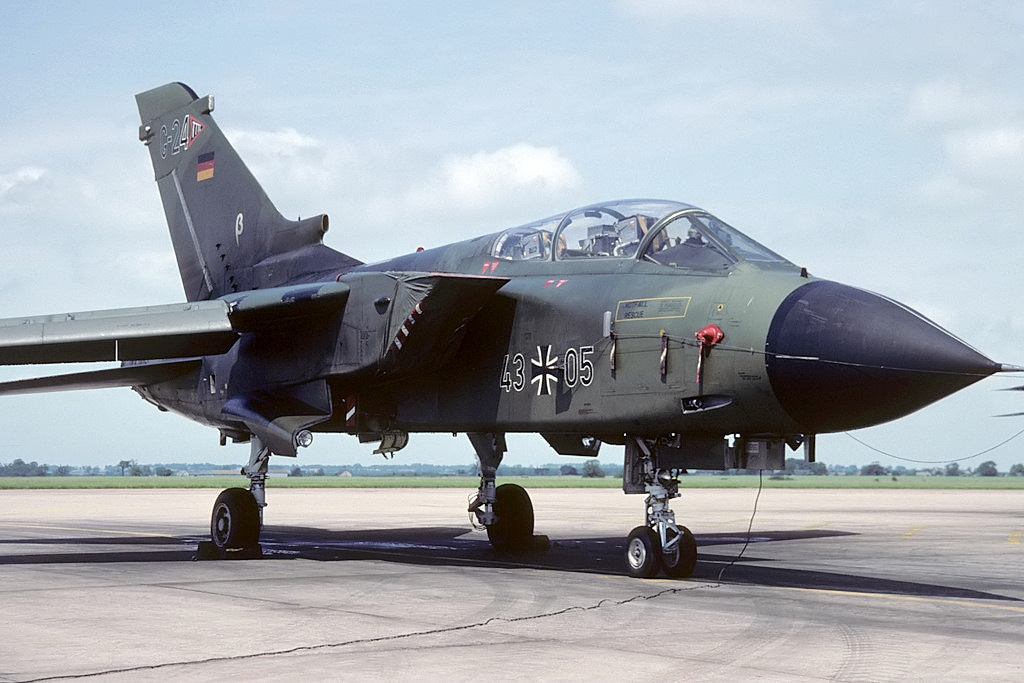
A German Tornado IDS belonging to the TTTE

Allocation of aircraft was Germany: 23, UK: 19, and Italy: 6. Flying training began on 5 January 1981. It was manned by personnel of all three participating nations, trained 300 crews a year when at its height and consisted of three squadrons of Tornados.

TTTE was a unit of approximately 1,600 military and 130 civilian employees. The Royal Air Force provided technicians and logistics personnel, the staff and the three training squadrons were manned by the three nations. The post of the Wing Commander varied between the three nations.

=== Units ===
Staff and students of the three squadrons (Tornado Operational Conversion Unit – TOCU) were tri-nationally mixed. A-Squadron was headed by a German, B-Squadron by a British and C-Squadron by an Italian squadron commander.

Standardization Squadron (S-Squadron) was responsible for follow-on training, training of instructor pilots and conducting check flights. Theory lessons and simulator training was conducted by Ground School.

=== Funding ===
Cost sharing followed the ratio of flown sorties: 40:40:20 (Germany/Great Britain/Italy).

== Incidents ==
=== 1988 crash ===
On Tuesday 9 August 1988, at 9.30pm, two Panavia Tornado aircraft collided at Blencarn, from RAF Cottesmore TTTE and 617 Sqn at RAF Marham. All were killed.

The Cottesmore aircraft 'ZA329' had pilot Flt Lt John Watts, aged 32, from Castle Bytham in Lincolnshire, but originally from Surrey, an instructor who was married, with a German trainee navigator Lt Ulrich Sayer, aged 23. In 1987 16 RAF pilots were killed.

=== 1999 crash ===
At Mattersey in north Nottinghamshire on 21 January 1999 at 11.35pm, a Cottesmore Tornado 'ZA330' had a mid air collision with a light aircraft Cessna 152 'G-BPZX'

In the Tornado was Flt Lt Greg Hurst, aged 35, and Second Lt Matteo di Carlo, an Italian, who had been with the RAF since 4 December 1998, from Rieti, and he had his 25th birthday on 16 January 1999. The Tornado had left Cottesmore ten minutes earlier. The Tornado was found next to the A631 at Everton, Nottinghamshire.

== Closure ==
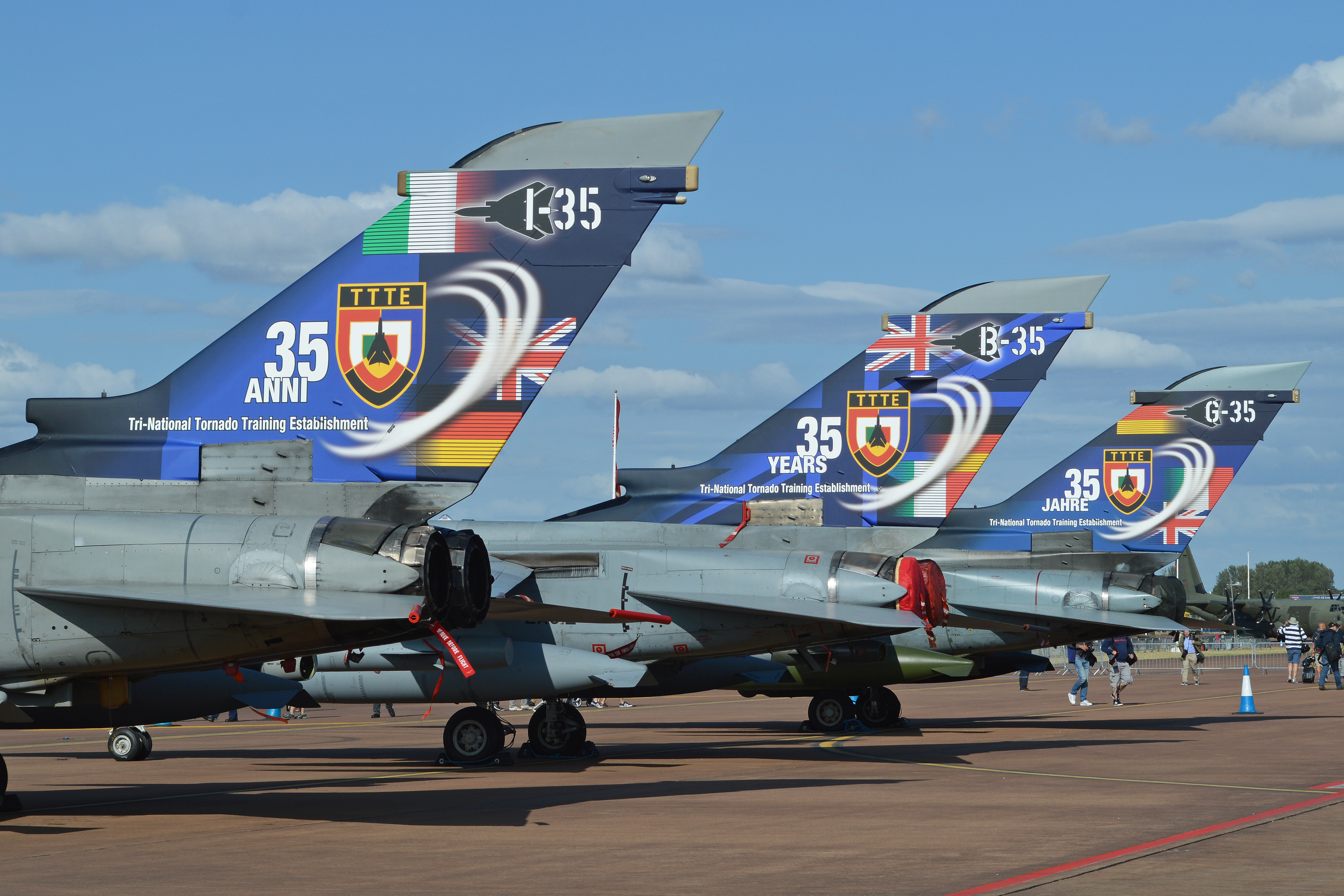
Three Panavia Tornados displaying special markings during 2015 to celebrate the 35th anniversary of the formation of the TTTE

In the post-Cold War era and the growing differences in the aircraft variants, the three nations decided that they would be better served performing their own type training. There was also a need to find space for British aircraft returning to the UK from Royal Air Force Germany bases, such as RAF Bruggen, that were closing. Consequently, the unit disbanded on 24 February 1999, with Tornado flying ending on 31 March 1999.

After TTTE, Cottesmore became the base for Joint Force Harrier. The station housed all the operational Harrier GR9 squadrons in the Royal Air Force, and No. 122 Expeditionary Air Wing. In April 2012 RAF Cottesmore was transferred to the British Army and renamed Kendrew Barracks.

=== Precedent for other training establishments ===
While the Eurofighter project has followed the example of the Tornado programme in many ways, the TTTE model was not adopted. Rather the Eurofighter partners (Germany, Italy, Spain and United Kingdom) have chosen to run national training schemes.

== See also ==
- List of Royal Air Force units & establishments
