= 316th Operations Group =

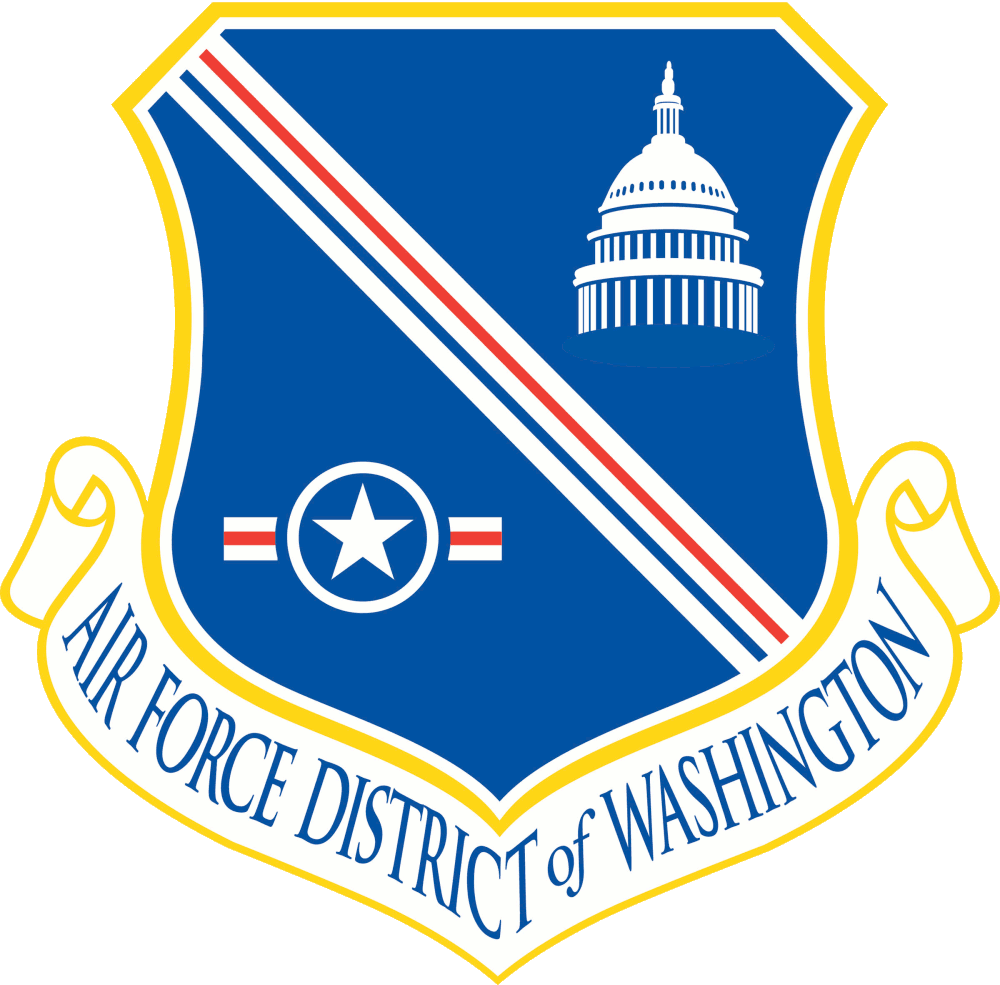
316th Operations Group

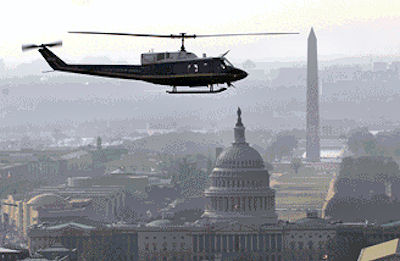
- Group UH-1N Huey flying near the United States Capitol
- Active: 1942–1957; 1978–1989; 1992–1994; 2006–2010; 2020–present
- Country: United States
- Branch: United States Air Force
- Role: Support for Air Force units in the Capital Area
- Part of: Air Force District of Washington
- Garrison/HQ: Joint Base Andrews
- Motto: Valor Without Arms (1951-1994) Nobilis est Ira Leonis (Latin for 'The Lion's Wrath is Righteous') (1944-1951)
- Engagements: Mediterranean Theater of Operations; European Theater of Operations
- Decorations: Distinguished Unit Citation; Air Force Outstanding Unit Award

Insignia
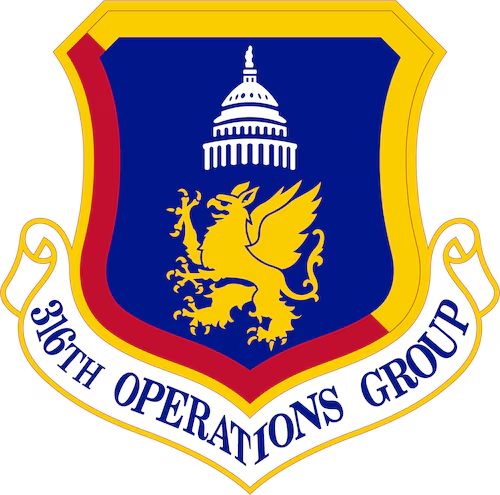
- 316th Operations Group emblem (Note: While assigned to the 316th Wing, the group uses the wing emblem with the group designation on the scroll. AF Instruction 84-105, Organizational Lineage, Honors and History, 27 April 2017, paragraph 3.3.3. This rendering was approved on 8 March 2023.)

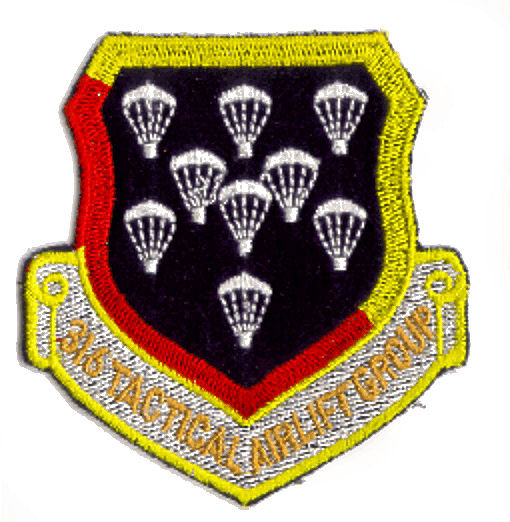
- Patch with 316th Troop Carrier Group emblem. (Note: Approved 17 August 1951. Description: Azure, nine parachutes argent, three, two and one, all within a bordure per bend or and gules.)

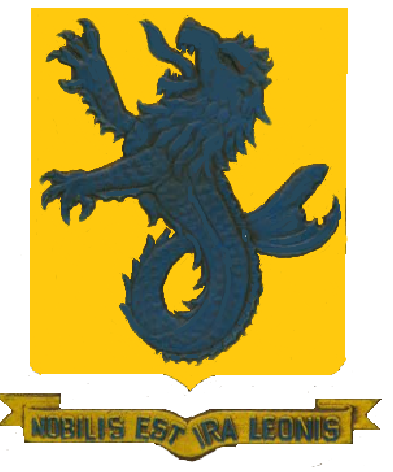
- 316th Troop Carrier Group emblem (World War II)

The 316th Operations Group is the flying component of the Air Force District of Washington's 316th Wing, stationed at Joint Base Andrews, Maryland. It provides rotary-wing contingency response support capability to the United States National Capital Region while also supporting regional and global customers with critical airfield infrastructure and aviation services. The group consists of two squadrons of aircrew and support personnel.

As the 316th Troop Carrier Group, it was a decorated Douglas C-47 Skytrain unit that served with Ninth and Twelfth Air Force in the European and the Mediterranean theaters. As part of Operation Avalanche, the Allied invasion of Italy, the 316th dropped paratroops over the beachhead south of the Sele River on the night of 14 September 1943. Later during Operation Overlord, the Allied invasion of France, the group dropped paratroops near Ste-Mere-Eglise a few hours before the main landings on 6 June 1944. It also dropped paratroops and released gliders carrying reinforcements during the airborne invasion of the Netherlands, Operation Market-Garden in September 1944. By the end of the war, the 316th Troop Carrier Group was awarded three Distinguished Unit Citations.

== Mission ==
The group oversees the operations of the 1st Helicopter Squadron and the 316th Operations Support Squadron.

The 1st Helicopter Squadron supports Washington D.C. capital area airlift for the Executive Branch, high-ranking dignitaries, high-ranking military leaders and other VIPs. It operates Bell UH-1N Hueys.

The 316th Operations Support Squadron provides the necessary aviation related support infrastructure and services for the Group and the 25 other tenant flying units on Andrews AFB.

== History ==
=== World War II ===
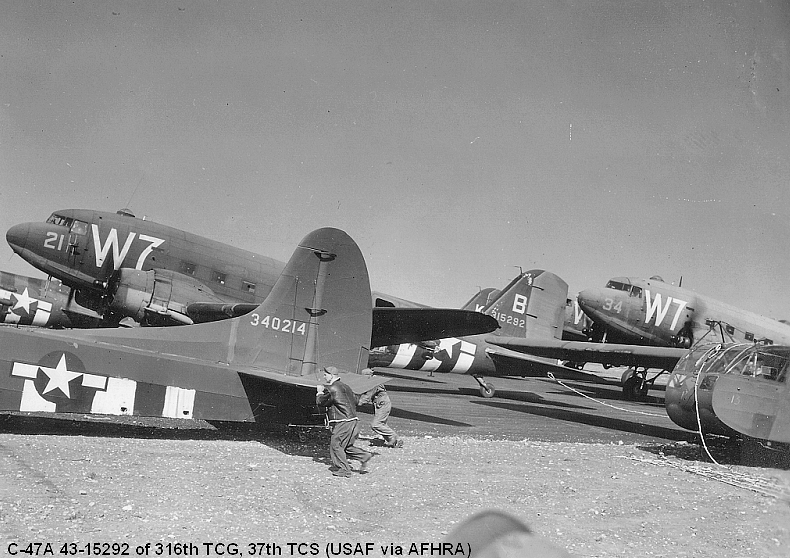
Douglas C-47A of the 37th Troop Carrier Squadron before Operation Market (Note: Aircraft is Douglas C-47A-80-DL 43-15292, September 1944, note that the invasion stripes added for the invasion of France have been partially removed. Ford CG-4A-FO 43-40214 Waco Glider in front being moved by ground personnel.)

Trained with I Troop Carrier Command with Douglas C-47 Skytrain and Douglas C-53 Skytrooper aircraft. Moved to the Mediterranean theater, assigned to Ninth Air Force, and began operations in November 1942. Flew combat missions in North Africa Egypt/Libya campaign. Transported supplies and evacuated casualties in support of the Allied drive across North Africa.

In February 1943 the 316th became a part of the 52nd Troop Carrier Wing of the Northwest African Troop Carrier Command in the Allied air force organization in the Mediterranean Theater of Operations (MTO). In May 1943, the group began training for the invasion of Sicily where they dropped paratroopers over the assault area on the night of 9 July, and carried reinforcements on 11 July, receiving DUC for carrying out that mission although severely attacked by ground and naval forces. They received another DUC for supporting aerial and ground operations in Egypt, Libya, Tunisia, and Sicily, 25 November 1942 – 25 August 1943, by transporting reinforcements and supplies. During this period, the group was under the command of Colonel Jerome McCauley.

The 316th was assigned to Twelfth Air Force and moved to Sicily to take part in the invasion of Italy, where it dropped paratroops over the beachhead south of the Sele River on the night of 14 September 1943. They transported cargo in the theater until February 1944, then joined Ninth Air Force in England and prepared for the invasion of France.

The unit dropped paratroops near Ste-Mere-Eglise on D—Day 1944 and flew a reinforcement mission on 7 June, receiving a third Distinguished Unit Citation for these operations. During Operation Market Garden, they dropped paratroops and released gliders carrying reinforcements. Again they dropped paratroops near Wesel on 24 March 1945 when the Allies made the airborne assault across the Rhine River. They also provided transport services in Europe while not engaged in airborne operations, hauling supplies such as ammunition, gasoline, water, and rations; along with evacuating wounded personnel to rear-zone hospitals.

=== Cold War ===
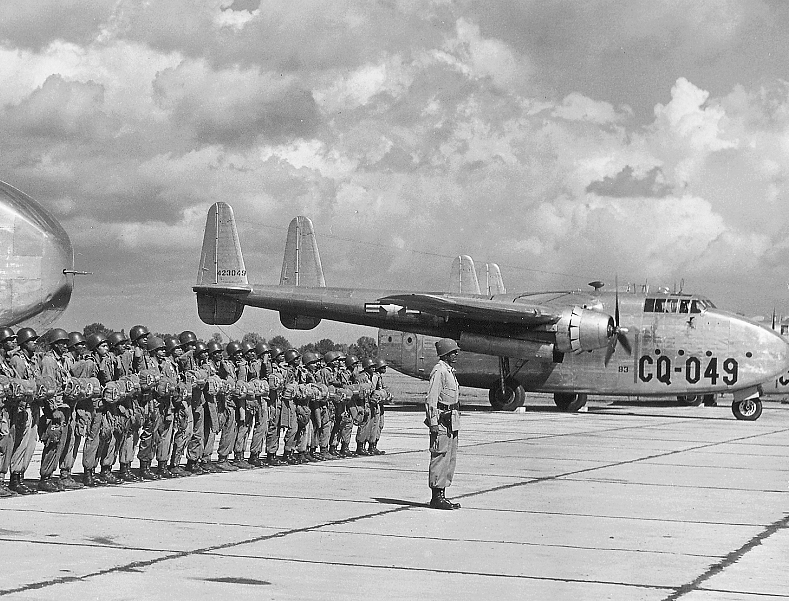
316th Troop Carrier Group C-82 about to airlift paratroops in an exercise. (Note: Aircraft is Fairchild C-82A-30-FA Packet serial 44-23049.)

Returned to the US in May 1945. Trained with C-47 Fairchild C-82 Packet and later Fairchild C-119 Flying Boxcar aircraft as part of Tactical Air Command.

Transferred, without personnel and equipment, to Japan on 15 November 1954. Assigned to Far East Air Forces, manned, and equipped with C-119s and performed theater airlift missions primarily to Japan, Okinawa, Philippines and South Korea. Inactivated in 1957.

=== Twenty-first century ===
Activated in 2006 to be operational flying component of AFDW 316th Wing in Washington D.C. area., inactivated in 2010, reactivated in 2020.

== Lineage ==
- Constituted as the 316th Transport Group on 2 February 1942

Activated on 14 February 1942
Redesignated 316th Troop Carrier Group on 1 July 1942
Redesignated 316th Troop Carrier Group, Medium on 23 August 1948
Redesignated 316th Troop Carrier Group, Heavy on 8 October 1949
Redesignated 316th Troop Carrier Group, on 28 January 1950
Inactivated on 18 June 1957

- Redesignated 316th Tactical Airlift Group on 23 August 1978

Activated on 1 October 1978
Inactivated on 1 October 1989

- Redesignated 316th Airlift Support Group and activated on 1 April 1992

Inactivated on 1 July 1994

- Redesignated 316th Operations Group on 21 June 2006

Activated on 22 June 2006
Inactivated on 1 October 2010
Activated on 25 June 2020

=== Assignments ===
- Air Service Command, 14 February 1942
- 50th Transport Wing, 31 March 1942
- 52d Transport Wing (later 52d Troop Carrier Wing), 20 June 1942
- 53rd Troop Carrier Wing, 12 October 1942
- 50th Troop Carrier Wing, 3 November 1942
- Ninth Air Force, c. 23 November 1942
- IX Air Service Command, 4 February 1943
- 52d Troop Carrier Wing, 26 August 1943
- 60th Troop Carrier Wing, 10 June 1945
- 50th Troop Carrier Wing, 9 October 1945
- Third Air Force, 31 July 1946
- Ninth Air Force, 1 November 1946
- 316th Troop Carrier Wing, 15 August 1947
- 314th Troop Carrier Wing, 4 November 1949
- 483d Troop Carrier Wing, 18 March 1955 – 18 June 1957
- 374th Tactical Airlift Wing, 1 October 1978 – 1 October 1989
- Twenty-Second Air Force, 1 April 1992 - 30 June 1994
- Fifteenth Air Force, 1 July 1993 – 1 July 1994
- 316th Wing, 22 June 2006 – 1 October 2010
- 316th Wing, 25 June 2020 – present

=== Components ===
- 1st Helicopter Squadron: 22 June 2006 – 1 October 2010, 25 June 2020 – present
- 5th Helicopter Squadron: 27 August 2026 – present
- 13th Airlift Squadron: 1 April – 1 June 1992
- 16th Troop Carrier Squadron: 5 October 1950 – 15 November 1954
- 19th Airlift Squadron: 1 April 1992 – 1 June 1992
- 36th Transport Squadron (later 36th Troop Carrier Squadron): 14 February 1942 – 18 June 1957
- 37th Transport Squadron (later 37th Troop Carrier Squadron): 14 February 1942 – 8 May 1952 (attached to 314th Troop Carrier Group after 21 August 1950) 8 May 1952 – 18 June 1957
- 38th Transport Squadron: 14 February – 18 May 1942
- 44th Transport Squadron (later 44th Troop Carrier Squadron): 14 February 1942 – May 1945
- 45th Transport Squadron (later 45th Troop Carrier Squadron): 15 June 1942 – May 1945
- 75th Troop Carrier Squadron: 11 December 1945 – 22 November 1949, 20 December 1952 – 18 June 1957
- 77th Troop Carrier Squadron: 11 December 1945 – 10 June 1946
- 316th Operations Support Squadron: 22 June 2006 – 1 October 2010, 25 June 2020 – present
- 345th Tactical Airlift Squadron: 1 October 1978 – 1 October 1989
- 1403d Military Airlift Squadron: 1 August 1984 – 1 Oct 1989

=== Stations ===
- Patterson Field, Ohio, 14 February 1942
- Bowman Field, Kentucky, 17 June 1942
- Lawson Field, Georgia, 9 August 1942
- Del Valle Army Air Base, Texas, 29 September – 12 November 1942
- RAF Deversoir, Egypt, 23 November 1942
- RAF El Adem, Egypt, 10 December 1942
- RAF Fayid, Egypt, January 1943
- Nouvion Airfield, Algeria, 9 May 1943
- Guercif Airfield, French Morocco, 29 May 1943
- Enfidaville Airfield, Tunisia, 21 June 1943
- Mazzara Airfield, Sicily, Italy, 3 September 1943
- Borizzo Airfield, Sicily, Italy, 18 October 1943 – 12 February 1944
- RAF Cottesmore (AAF-489), England, 15 February 1944 – 10 May 1945
- Pope Field, North Carolina, 25 May 1945
- Greenville Army Air Base (later Greenvillle Air Force Base), South Carolina, 25 August 1947
- Smyrna Air Force Base (later Sewart Air Force Base), Tennessee, 4 November 1949
- Ashiya Air Base, Japan, 15 November 1954 – 18 June 1957
- Yokota Air Base, Japan, 1 October 1978 – 1 October 1989
- Yokota Air Base, 1 April 1992 - 30 June 1994
- Andrews Air Force Base (later Joint Base Andrews–NAF Washington), Maryland, 22 June 2006 – 1 October 2010
- Joint Base Andrews–NAF Washington, Maryland, 25 June 2020 – present

=== Aircraft ===
- Douglas C-47 Skytrain, 1942–1950
- Dougas C-53 Skytrooper, 1942–1943
- Fairchild C-82 Packet, 1945–1954
- Fairchild C-119 Flying Boxcar, 1949–1954; 1954–1957
- UH-1N Huey, 2006–2010, 2020–present
- HH-60W Jolly Green II, 2026-present
