= RAF Cottesmore =

Former Royal Air Force station in Rutland, England

RAF Cottesmore
- Cottesmore, Rutland in England
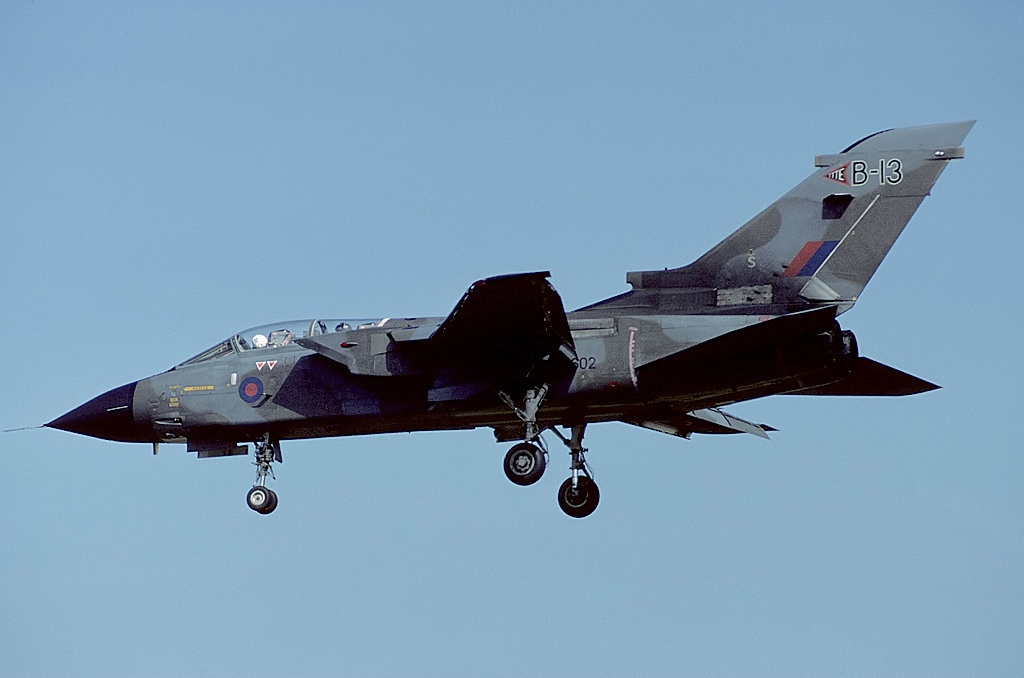
- A Panavia Tornado GR1 of the Tri-National Tornado Training Establishment.

- We Rise to Our Obstacles

Site information
- Type: Royal Air Force station
- Code: CT
- Owner: Ministry of Defence
- Operator: Royal Air Force (1938–1942 and 1945–2012); United States Army Air Forces (1943–1945)
- Controlled by: RAF Bomber Command * No. 5 Group RAF * No. 6 (T) Group RAF * No. 92 (OTU) Group RAF
- Condition: Closed

Location
- Location within Rutland RAF Cottesmore (the United Kingdom)
- Coordinates: 52°43′46″N 000°39′05″W
- Grid reference: SK905155
- Area: 379 hectares

Site history
- Built: 1936
- Built by: George Wimpey & Co Ltd
- In use: 1938–2012
- Fate: Transferred to the British Army and became Kendrew Barracks.
- Battles/wars: European theatre of World War II; Cold War

Airfield information
- Identifiers: IATA: OKH, ICAO: EGXJ, WMO: 03453
- Elevation: 140 metres (459 ft) AMSL
Runways
Direction	Length and surface
04/22	2,744 metres (9,003 ft) Asphalt
00/00 (WW2)	Concrete
00/00 (WW2)	Concrete
00/00 (WW2)	Concrete

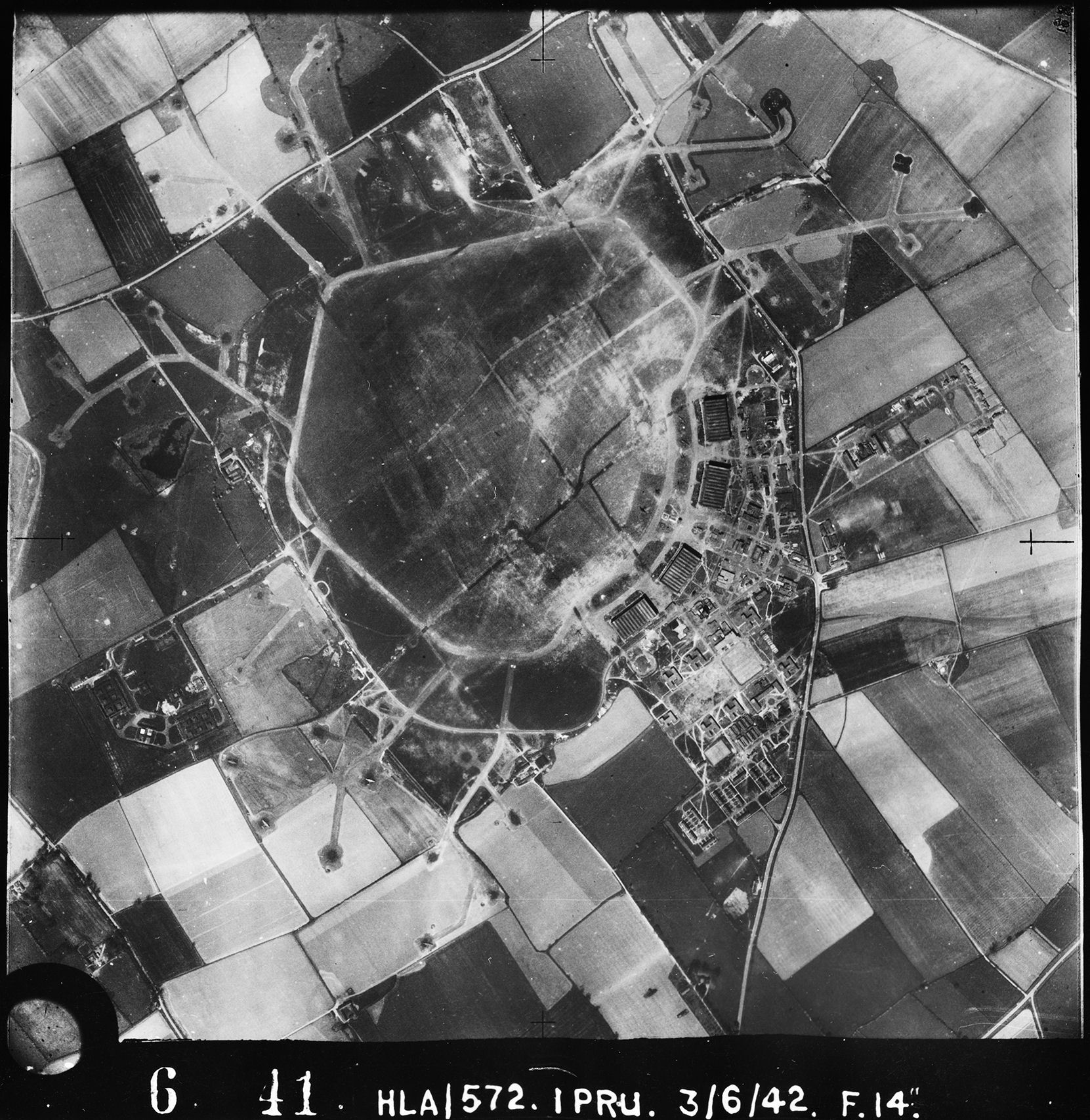
Aerial photograph of RAF Cottesmore looking north east, the technical site with four C-Type hangars is on the right, 3 Jun 1942.

Royal Air Force Cottesmore or more simply RAF Cottesmore is a former Royal Air Force station in Rutland, England, situated between Cottesmore and Market Overton. On 15 December 2009, Defence Secretary Bob Ainsworth announced that the station would close in 2013 as part of defence spending cuts, along with the retirement of the Harrier GR9 and the disbandment of Joint Force Harrier. The formal closing ceremony took place on 31 March 2011, and the airfield became a satellite of RAF Wittering until March 2012.

In July 2011 Defence Secretary Liam Fox announced plans for it to be the airfield for one of five of the Army's Multi-Role Brigades. In April 2012 it was renamed Kendrew Barracks after Major General Sir Douglas Kendrew.

== Station badge ==
The badge of RAF Cottesmore consisted of a hunting horn, a five-pointed star and a horseshoe. The description is "in front of a horseshoe a mullet overall a hunting horn in bend". The hunting horn symbolises the location in foxhunting country and the link with the Cottesmore Hunt; the American Star recalls the time the Station was a United States Army Air Force base; the inverted horseshoe is a traditional emblem of Oakham and the County of Rutland.

The motto "We rise to our obstacles" is both a reference to the Cottesmore Hunt and was intended to convey the spirit with which the Royal Air Force confronts difficulties. The badge was granted in 1948.

The badge appears on the nameplate of the LNER Peppercorn Class A1 60163 Tornado steam locomotive that was named by the Prince of Wales and the Duchess of Cornwall on 19 February 2009.

== History ==
=== Royal Air Force ===
RAF Cottesmore opened on 11 March 1938. The station was used mainly for training, and the first squadrons were equipped with Vickers Wellesley aircraft, but soon converted to Fairey Battles. Later RAF Bomber Command took over the airfield, again as a training station, flying Handley Page Hampdens.

These units remained in residence until a few days before the outbreak of the Second World War in 1939 when they were sent to RAF Cranfield to serve as a pool providing replacements for combat losses. Their place at Cottesmore was taken by Nos. 106 and 185 Squadrons, moving in from RAF Thornaby with Hampdens.

However, with the outbreak of war, the aircraft and crews were sent to locations in the north and west, as enemy air attacks were expected over the southern half of England. As these never materialised, the Hampdens returned in the spring of 1940 and No. 185 Squadron became the Hampden operational training unit, No. 14 Operational Training Unit RAF.

Cottesmore's Hampdens' first entry into hostile airspace was a leaflet dropping operation over northern France. In October 1940, 106 Squadron moved to RAF Finningley while No. 14 OTU remained training crews for Bomber Command, its Hampdens and Handley Page Herefords being replaced by Vickers Wellingtons in 1942. Training continued for three years and three months until August 1943 when No. 14 OTU moved to RAF Market Harborough.

In May 1943, No. 34 Heavy Glider Maintenance Section arrived, and was present until March 1944.

=== United States Army Air Forces ===
On 8 September 1943 the United States Army Air Forces took the facilities over, under the designation USAAF Station 489, flying troop transport aircraft. In anticipation of the station's future use by airborne forces, 32 Airspeed Horsa gliders were delivered for storage in July 1943.

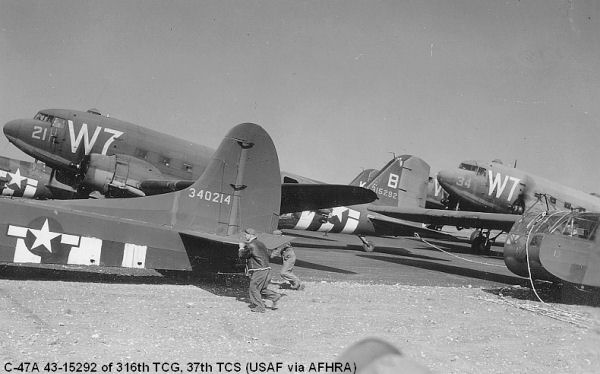
Douglas C-47A-80-DL Serial 43-15292 of the 36th TCS with Ford-Built CG-4A-FO "Waco" Glider 43–42014 at Cottesmore just prior to the D-Day parachute assault.

The 316th Troop Carrier Group began to arrive at Cottesmore on 15 February 1944 when 52 Douglas C-47 Skytrain and Douglas C-53 Skytrooper transports began flying in from Borizzo Airfield, Sicily. Flying squadrons and fuselage codes of the group were:

- 36th Troop Carrier Squadron (4C)
- 37th Troop Carrier Squadron (W7)
- 44th Troop Carrier Squadron (6E)
- 45th Troop Carrier Squadron (T3)

The 316th TCG was part of the 52d Troop Carrier Wing.

=== Post-war ===
Cottesmore was officially handed back to the RAF on 1 July 1945. It became a training station, hosting No. 7 Flying Training School RAF with Percival Prentice basic training aircraft and the North American Harvard trainer for advanced training – later replaced by the Boulton Paul Balliol which had a Rolls-Royce Merlin engine. No. 16 Operational Training Unit RAF was present between 1 March 1946 and 15 March 1947.

In 1954 English Electric Canberras were moved in (No. 44 Squadron RAF and No. 57 Squadron RAF), the first time front-line combat aircraft had been based there, but all had left by the end of 1955.

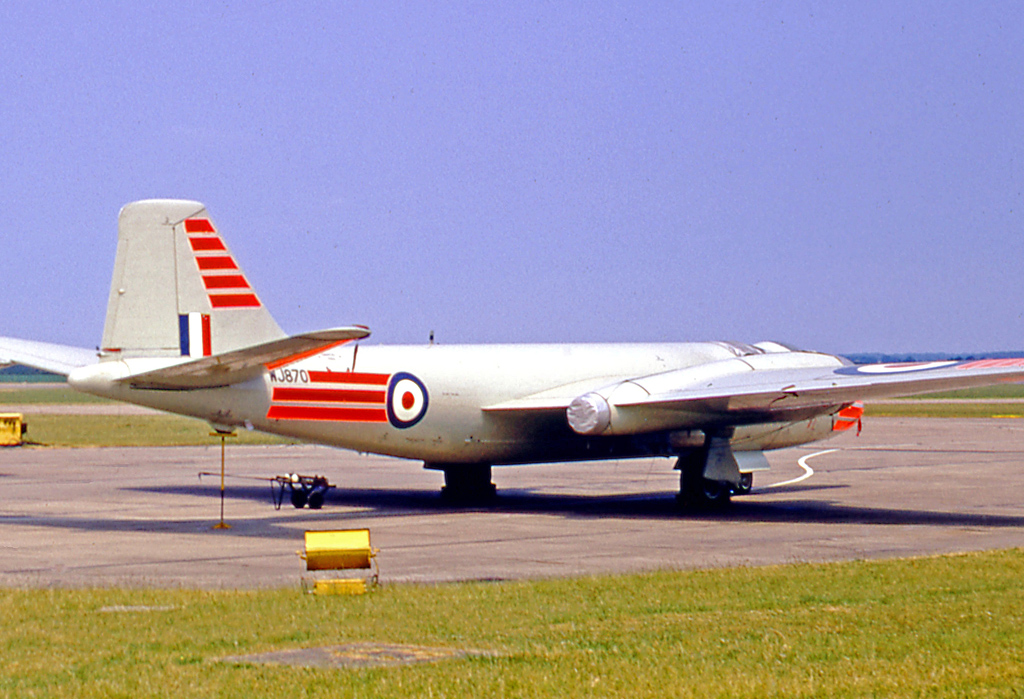
Canberra T.4 trainer of No.231 OCU at RAF Cottesmore in 1970.

In 1957, Cottesmore became home to aircraft of the V bombers, the UK's strategic nuclear strike force. No. 10 Squadron RAF reformed at Cottesmore on 15 April 1958 flying the Handley Page Victor B.1 until disbandment on 1 March 1964. The squadrons carried out Quick Reaction Alert duties using Handley Page Victor and later Avro Vulcan bombers until 1969.

"C" Flight, No. 232 Operational Conversion Unit RAF, was present from 1 November 1961 to 1 April 1962, at which point the Victor Training Flight stayed until 31 March 1964.

After the V-Bombers left, the base was used by 90 Signals Group. Flight Checking, Trials and Evaluation Flight (FCTEF) used 98 Squadron (Canberras) and 115 Squadron (Vickers Varsity and Armstrong Whitworth AW.660 Argosy) to provide ILS and radar trials and checking services to RAF airfields around the world. No. 231 Operational Conversion Unit moved into Cottesmore on 19 May 1969 equipped with Canberras, staying until 12 February 1976 when it moved to RAF Marham. No. 360 Squadron, an electronic countermeasures squadron flying Canberras, moved to RAF Cottesmore in April 1969. 360 Squadron moved in September 1975 to RAF Wyton.

In July 1980, Cottesmore became home to Tri-National Tornado Training Establishment (TTTE). Officially opened on 29 January 1981, the centre undertook training of new Panavia Tornado aircrews from the RAF, German Air Force, Marineflieger (German Navy air arm) and Italian Air Force.

The TTTE closed in 1999, and after a period of refurbishment was replaced by the British Aerospace Harrier IIs of Nos 3 and 4 squadrons; these were later joined by 800 and 801 Naval Air Squadrons to form Joint Force Harrier (JFH).

With the introduction of the Eurofighter Typhoon into RAF service, No. 3 Sqn moved to RAF Coningsby and No 1 Sqn moved from RAF Wittering. No. 122 Expeditionary Air Wing was also established at the station (2006–2011).

The following units were here at some point:

- No. 1 Bomber Defence Training Flight RAF as part of No. 1668 Heavy Conversion Unit RAF (September 1945 – ?)
- No. 9 Squadron RAF
- No. 12 Squadron RAF
- No. XV Squadron RAF
- No. 35 Squadron RAF
- No. 44 Gliding School RAF (July 1951 – July 1955)
- No. 98 Squadron RAF
- No. 115 Squadron RAF
- No. 149 Squadron RAF
- No. 204 Advanced Flying School RAF (March 1947 – March 1948)
- Detachment of No. 1507 (Beam Approach Training) Flight RAF (September – October 1942)
- No. 1668 Heavy Conversion Unit RAF (September 1945 – March 1946)
- Tornado Command Engineering and Investigation Development Team (July 1980 - August 1988)

== Closure ==
In early December 2009, the then Defence Secretary Bob Ainsworth announced the station would close due to funding cut-backs, in part to help pay for additional helicopters for British operations in Afghanistan.

In 2010, No. 4 Squadron RAF disbanded, with No. 20 Squadron RAF re-badging as No 4 (Reserve) Squadron.

The station became a satellite to RAF Wittering on 31 March 2011 with a civic parade and flypast to mark the disbandment of No 1 Sqn RAF, 800 NAS, 801 NAS and JFH. In July 2011, Defence Secretary Liam Fox announced that Cottesmore would house the Army's East of England Multi-Role Brigade.

== Station commanders ==
- AVM James Johnson CB CBE 1957–1960
- Air Cdre Robert Weighill CBE DFC 1961–1964
- Group Captain Jack Garden 1965–1967
- Gp Capt L. G. Bastard 1969–1971
- AVM Kenneth Kingshott CBE DFC 1971
- Air Cdre Alan Jenkins 1973
- Gp Capt Brian Gubbins 1975
- Air Mshl Sir Michael Simmons KCB, AFC 1980–1982
- Air Commodore Terry Carlton, 1982–1984
- AVM Peter Goddard, CB 1984–1986
- Air Chf Mshl Sir Peter Squire DFC 1986–1988
- AVM Ronald Elder CBE 1988–1990
- AVM Thomas Rimmer CB OBE 1990–1992
- Air Marshall Philip Sturley CB MBE 1992–1994
- Group Captain Malcolm Ball AFC 1994 -1996
- AVM Andrew White CB 1996–1999
- Group Captain David Walker 1999–2001
- Group Captain Michael Harwood 2001–2003
- Group Captain Andrew Golledge 2003–2005
- Group Captain Sean Bell 2005–2007
- Group Captain Ken McCann 2007–2009
- Group Captain Gary Waterfall 2009 – Station closure in 2011

== Kendrew Barracks ==
The Army officially took over the site in April 2012. It is now home to the 2nd Battalion Royal Anglian Regiment, who moved from Dhekelia Garrison in Cyprus. A second regiment, 7 Regiment Royal Logistic Corps, moved to the base in 2013.

Kendrew Barracks was officially opened in October 2012 by the Duke of Gloucester.

== See also ==
- List of former Royal Air Force stations
- 82nd Airborne Division
