= Guercif Airfield =

Abandoned Moroccan military base

Guercif Airfield
- Part of Twelfth Air Force

Site information
- Type: Military airfield
- Controlled by: United States Army Air Forces

Location
- Coordinates: 34°15′15.40″N 003°19′40.44″W

Site history
- Built: Early 1943
- In use: April–June 1943
- Battles/wars: North African Campaign

Location of Guercif Airfield, French Morocco

Guercif Airfield is an abandoned military airfield in Morocco, located about 4 km northeast of Guercif (Taza-Al Hoceima-Taounate); 400 km east-northeast of Casablanca, near the Algerian border.

== History ==
During World War II the airfield's primary use was for tactical photographic reconnaissance and C-47 Skytrain troop carrier and logistics operations by the Twelfth Air Force. The airfield was constructed as a temporary facility, with a hard earth or pierced steel planking (PSP) runway and parking apron. with few or no permanent structures, Tents were used for ground support operations and personnel billeting.

The first operations from the airfield began at the beginning of April 1943, soon after its construction by Army Engineers when the 111th Observation Squadron (Medium) of the 68th Observation Group began flying A-20 Havoc reconnaissance and photographic observation missions. The squadron remained at the airfield until it moved to Nouvion Airfield, Algeria at the end of May.

A few days later, elements of the 316th Troop Carrier Group, the 36th, and 45th Squadrons began arriving on the airfield at the end of May. Group HQ moved in a few days later from Nouvion, Algeria. The group flew operational missions as part of the North African Campaign from the airfield until the end of June when the unit moved up to Enfidaville Airfield, Tunisia to better support the advancing Allied forces. After the 316th moved east, the airfield was dismantled and the land returned to civil authorities.

Today the airfield is an open, undeveloped area seen on aerial photography northeast of the town.
