= Mazzara Airfield =

World War II military airfield in Italy

Mazara Airfield
- Part of Twelfth Air Force

Site information
- Type: Military airfield
- Controlled by: United States Army Air Forces

Location
- Coordinates: 37°41′34″N 012°36′35″E

Site history
- Built: 1943
- In use: 1943
- Battles/wars: Operation Avalanche (invasion of Salerno, Italy)

Garrison information
- Garrison: 316th Troop Carrier Group

Location of Mazzara Airfield, Italy

Mazara Airfield is an abandoned World War II military airfield in Italy which was located about 3 km north-northeast of Mazara del Vallo on Sicily.

It was built before 1943 and used by Axis forces before being seized by elements of the United States Fifth Army during the Sicilian Campaign. Once in Allied hands, it was used by the United States Army Air Force Twelfth Air Force 316th Troop Carrier Group between 1 September and 18 October 1943. The unit had three squadrons of C-47 Skytrain transport aircraft, used for carrying cargo, personnel and for paratrooper combat drops. The first components were the 45th and 46th Troop Carrier Squadrons, arriving from Enfidaville Airfield, Tunisia on 1 September; Group headquarters and the 35th Troop Carrier Squadron arrived on 3 September

The airfield was not used during Operation Husky (invasion of Sicily). It appears to have been a staging airfield for Operation Avalanche (invasion of Salerno, Italy). Since there were no airborne parachute landings during the Salerno invasion, it likely ferried supplies and personnel. Once Allied ground forces were on mainland Italy, the American use of the airfield appears to have ended; the 316th moved on to another airfield at Borizzo Airfield, Sicily.

When the Americans pulled out the airfield was abandoned. Today the outline of what may have been the main runway can be seen in aerial imagery.
