= Abu Sultan Air Base =

Active base of the Egyptian Air Force

Abu Sultan Air Base RAF Deversoir LG-209
- Abu Sultan, Ismailia Governorate, Egypt
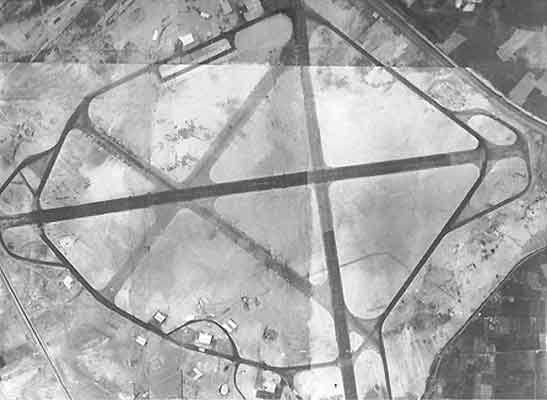
- RAF Deversoir – Airfield about 1945 mosaic

Site information
- Owner: Egyptian Armed Forces
- Operator: Egyptian Air Force (1956–Present); Royal Air Force (1935–1956); United States Army Air Forces (1942–45)
- Controlled by: Egyptian Air Force; Middle East Air Force; Ninth Air Force

Location
- Location in Egypt
- Coordinates: 30°25′22″N 032°20′07″E

Site history
- Battles/wars: Mediterranean and Middle East theatre of World War II: Western Desert campaign; Yom Kippur War: Operation Abirey-Halev

Airfield information
- Elevation: 8.8 metres (29 ft) AMSL
Runways
Direction	Length and surface
09/27	430 metres (1,411 ft) Asphalt
18/36	590 metres (1,936 ft) Asphalt

Abu Sultan Air Base (LG-209) is an airbase of the Egyptian Air Force located approximately 19 km south-southeast of Ismailia (Al Isma`iliyah); 116 km northeast of Cairo, Egypt. It was formerly a major Royal Air Force station known as RAF Deversoir built before the Second World War.

The remaining RAF units vacated Deversoir following the coup that saw Gamal Abdel Nasser seize power in June 1956.

The base is home to both 30 and 56 Squadrons which fly the Aérospatiale SA-342L Gazelle.

== History ==
Deversoir was a Royal Air Force (RAF) military airfield built in the 1930s. It was built part of the defences of the Suez Canal, being constructed at the northwest shore of the Great Bitter Lake. During the Second World War, it was used as a military airfield by the RAF and the United States Army Air Forces during the North African campaign against Axis forces.

The airfield received United States President Franklin D. Roosevelt on 12 February 1945 as he flew from the Yalta Conference to rejoin the USS Quincy, which was anchored in the Great Bitter Lake and would host the President's meetings with King Farouk of Egypt, King Abdulaziz of Saudi Arabia, and Emperor Haile Selassie of Ethiopia before transporting him back to the United States.

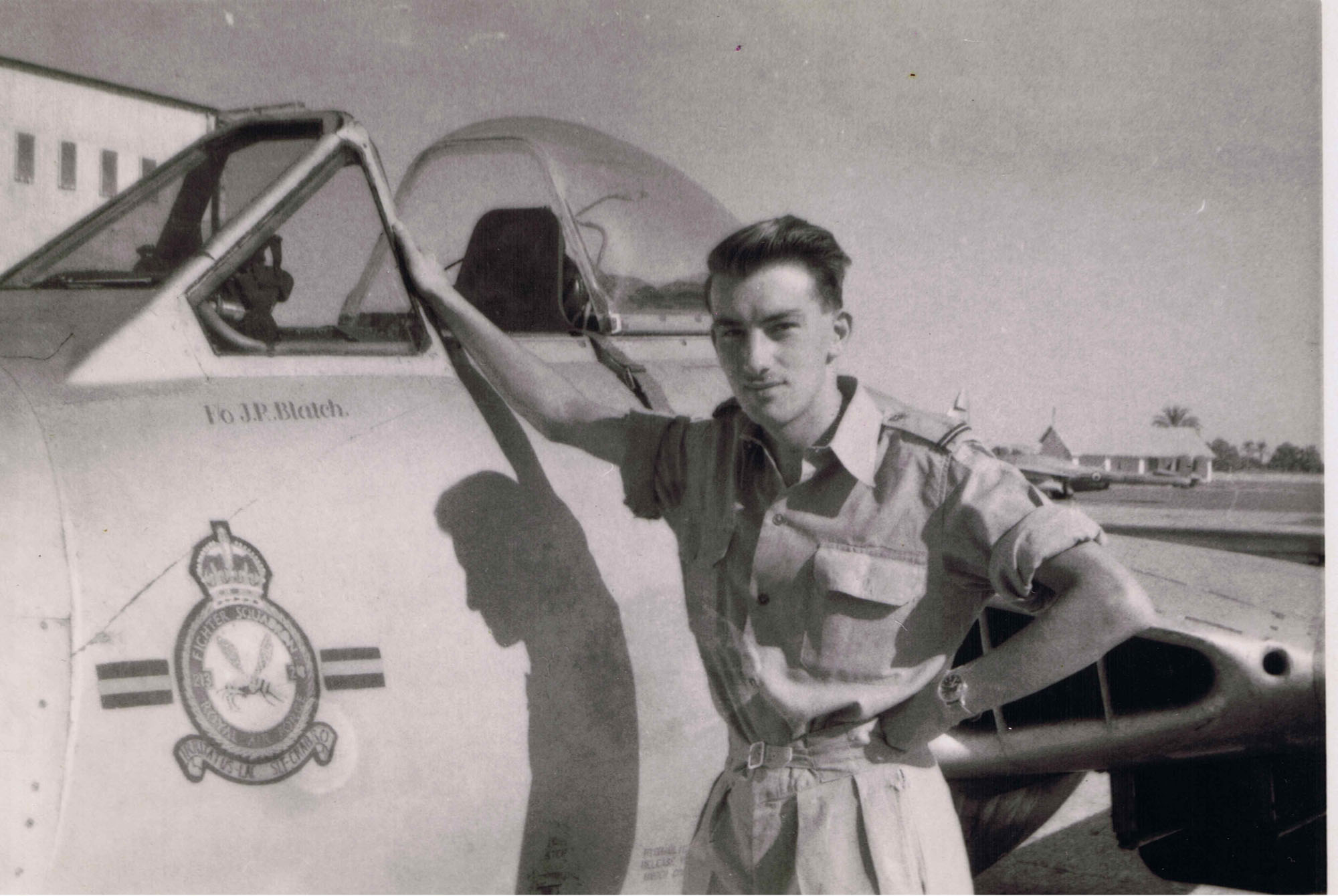
An RAF pilot from 213 (Fighter) Squadron beside a Vampire FB.9 at RAF Deversoir in summer 1954.

Deversoir was used by the RAF after the war until March 1955 when it was handed over to the Egyptian Air Force. Modern hardened aircraft shelters were built on wartime-era dispersal pads, and recent runway markings are evident in aerial photography. The airbase is being used to accommodate a helicopter unit flying Aérospatiale SA-342L Gazelle, armed helicopters.

RAF Deversoir was operative as No. 324 Fighter Wing from 24 August 1948 when it was the home of three squadrons of de Havilland Vampire aircraft plus three Gloster Meteors, one to each squadron. The squadrons were numbers 213 and 249. Some time near the end of WW2 the station had been used to house Italian prisoners of war and this was evidenced by a painting done by one of them which was present in 1950 – 1952 in one of the cookhouse dining room for other ranks.

During the mid-1950s Canal Zone patrols were carried out by RAF jets from the station. A rotation of standby aircraft from the station's Vampire squadrons was put in place, with RAF jets frequently scrambled to intercept Egyptian air force aircraft. This included Meteors and Constellations.

Relations between the United Kingdom and Egypt continued to deteriorate in the wake of the 1952 revolution.

213 (Fighter) Squadron, the last RAF flying squadron based there, disbanded at Deversoir on 30 September 1954, with the pilots and ground crew dispersed to other RAF stations outside Egypt. In 1958, Deversoir was utilised by the Egyptian Air Force for the Gloster Meteor and de Havilland Vampire aircraft. It was reported to be in poor condition, and stored approximately 96,000 gallons of fuel. It had 62 permanent personnel accommodations and 852 temporary personnel accommodations.

== Major units assigned ==
Royal Air Force
Second World War

- No. 33 Air Stores Park (4 – 17 Jul 1942, 2 Sep – 15 Oct 1943)
- No. 63 Repair & Salvage Unit (7 Jul – Aug 1943)
- No. 26 Anti-Aircraft Co-operation Unit (6 Mar 1945 – 1 Jan 1946)
- No. 417 Squadron RAF
  - 18 July 1942 and 5 September 1942 with the Supermarine Spitfire VB
- No. 680 Squadron RAF
  - 25 February 1945 and 9 July 1946 with the Spitfire XI, Mosquito XVI & XXXIV, Martin Baltimore V & Fairchild Argus

Post War

- HQ, No. 324 Wing (28 Aug 1948 – Feb 1951)
- No. 6 Squadron RAF
  - 1 September 1948 until 7 January 1950 with the Hawker Tempest F.6 & Vampire FB.5
  - 9 February until 1 June 1950 with the Vampire FB.5
  - 29 June until 22 November 1950
  - 21 December 1950 until 5 April 1951
  - 22 May 1951 until 18 June 1951
- No. 8 Squadron RAF
  - 14 August until 23 September 1953 with the Vampire FB.9
  - 1 October 1953 until 23 November 1953
- No. 32 Squadron RAF
  - 27 January 1952 until 15 September 1954 with the Vampire FB.9
- No. 73 Squadron RAF
  - 17 July 1953 until 20 July 1953 with the Vampire FB.9
- No. 213 (Ceylon) Squadron RAF
  - 21 October 1948 until 12 August 1953 with the Tempest F.6, Vampire FB.5 & FB.9
  - 29 October 1953 until 30 September 1954 with the Vampire FB.9
- No. 249 (Gold Coast) Squadron RAF
  - 29 March 1949 until 28 June 1949 with the Tempest F.6 & Vampire FB.5
  - 8 August 1949 and 24 June 1950
  - 10 August 1950 until 1 April 1951 – det at RAF Negombo
  - 27 April 1951 until 14 July 1951
  - 24 October 1951 until 16 April 1952
  - 9 May 1952 until 8 June 1954
- No. 256 Squadron RAF
  - 16 December 1945 until 13 July 1946 with the de Havilland Mosquito XIX & XVI

United States Army Air Forces (Ninth Air Force)

- 57th Bombardment Wing 5 June-28 August 1943
- 12th Bombardment Group, 31 July–October 1942, North American B-25 Mitchell
- 316th Troop Carrier Group, 23 November–December 1942. Douglas C-47 Skytrain
- 19th Photographic Mapping Squadron, 30 January 1944 – 31 January 1945 (B-24/F-7 Liberator)

== Current use ==
The base is home to both 30 and 56 Squadrons which fly the Aérospatiale SA-342L Gazelle.

== See also ==
- List of former Royal Air Force stations
- List of North African airfields during World War II
