= Nouvion Airfield =

Airfield in Algeria

Nouvion Airfield
- Part of Twelfth Air Force

Site information
- Type: Military airfield
- Controlled by: United States Army Air Forces

Location
- Coordinates: 35°40′35.21″N 000°10′53.43″E

Site history
- Built: 1942
- In use: 1942-1944

Location of Oran Tafaraoui Airport, Algeria

Nouvion Airfield was a pre-war airport and World War II military airfield in Algeria, located about 5 km west of Camp Militaire d' El Ghomri in Mascara province; about 76 km east of Oran.

== History ==
The facility was built in the 1930s as a civil airport. In the immediate aftermath of the Allied Operation Torch landings in Algeria on 8 November 1942, the airport was taken over by the United States Army Air Force Twelfth Air Force as a military airfield.

When taken over by the USAAF, Nouvion consisted of basically one long building and a rough airstrip. The Army Corps of Engineers moved in to upgrade the facility to minimum military requirements. The airport's runway was improved and a pierced steel planking (PSP) parking apron was constructed, utilizing the few permanent existing structures. Tents were used for ground support operations and personnel billeting.

After several weeks, the 1st Fighter Group arrived at the field from Oran Tafaraoui Airport on 20 November, operating P-38 Lightnings.

During its entire tenure at the airfield, the 1st flew combat operations while ongoing construction continued. It moved east on 14 December to Biskra. Other units that were assigned to Nouvion were:

- HQ, 87th Fighter Wing, 11 January-9 February 1944
- 27th Bombardment Group, January–April 1943, A-20 Havoc
- 62d Troop Carrier Group, 24 December 1942 – 16 May 1943, C-47 Skytrain
- 316th Troop Carrier Group, 9–29 May 1943, C-47 Skytrain

Active operations at the airfield ended by the end of May 1943, as the front moved east into Tunisia. The Americans dismantled their facilities by the end of July and returned the former airport to French authorities. Today, the airfield is part of the Algerian Military Camp Militaire d' El Ghomri.
