= Enfidaville Airfield =

World War II military airfield in Tunisia

Enfidaville Airfield
- Part of Twelfth Air Force

Site information
- Type: Military airfield
- Controlled by: United States Army Air Forces

Location
- Coordinates: 36°08′04.42″N 010°25′51.19″E

Site history
- Built: 1943
- In use: 1943

Location of Enfidaville Airfield, Tunisia

Enfidaville Airfield is an abandoned World War II military airfield in Tunisia, located approximately 13 km north-northwest of Harqalah; approximately 90 km southwest of Tunis. It was used by the United States Army Air Force Twelfth Air Force during the North African Campaign as a B-24 heavy bomber and troop carrier base. The units known to be assigned to the base were:

- 316th Troop Carrier Group, 21 June - 3 September 1943, C-47 Skytrain
- 376th Bombardment Group, 26 September - 17 November 1943, B-24 Liberator

The 376th Bomber Group was composed of B-24 Liberator heavy bombers. Aircrew and support personnel began arriving in late August, 1943. The first mission carried out by the 376th was on 1 October 1943 against the aircraft factory at Wiener Neustadt in Austria.

When the Americans moved to Italy, the airfield was dismantled and abandoned. For many years the airfield had almost completely returned to its natural state, with only the outlines of the main runway and what appeared to be taxiways faintly visible in aerial photography. Today it is the location of the Enfidha–Hammamet International Airport that was built in its place and opened in 2009.
