= List of defunct airlines of Italy =

This is a list of defunct airlines of Italy.

Airline	Image	IATA	ICAO	Callsign	Commenced operations	Ceased operations	Notes
24Airways					2017		Not launched
A
Action Air			ORS	AVIATION SERVICE			
Aeral		HS		SKYTRUCK	1958	1980	
Aeralpi					1962	1968	
Aerfly					2009		Not launched
Aermarche			MMC	AERMARCHE			
Aermediterranea		BQ	BQI	MEDITERRANEA	1981	1985	Merged into Aero Trasporti Italiani
Aero Espresso Italiana (AEI)					1926	1934	Merged into Società Aerea Mediterranea
Aero Trasporti Italiani-ATI		BM	ATI	ATI	1964	1994	Alitalia-Linee Aeree Italiane subsidiary Merged back into them
Aernord			AED	AERNSPA			
Aeropa		VZ	AAU		1973	1975	Formed out of SAV-Società Aerea Veneziana assets Operated Boeing 707
Aerotaxi Sud					1989	1990	Renamed Sagittair
Aeroveneta			EVT	AEROVENETA			
Aertirrena					1966	1974	Operated Britten Norman BN.2 Islander, Yakovlev Yak-40
Air 70					1967	1975	
Air Besit					1998	2001	Besit Servizi Aerei passenger scheduled operations brand Operated Swearingen Metroliner
Air Blu					1995	1995	Operated with third party AOC
Air Capitol		CK		AIRCAP	1978	1993	Aero-taxi with Falcon Mystere jets
Air Columbia					1984	2003	Renamed TAI – Transporti Aerei Italiani
Air Day							Not launched
Air Emilia		PQ			2003	2004	Operated ATR 42 and Beechcraft 1900 leased from Rossair
Air Europe		PE	AEL	AIR EUROPE	1989	2008	Operations coordinated with Volare from 2000
Air Freedom							Not launched
Air Halica					2002	2004	
Air Industria		7Y	IDU		2002	2003	
Air Italica		3B			2003	2003	Operated leased ATR 72
1st Air Italy (2001–2002)		NN	AJR	AIR ITALY	2001	2002	Operated leased MD.83 and Saab 2000
Air Italy (2005–2013)		I9	AEY	AIR ITALY	2005	2013	Merged operations into Meridiana
Air Italy (2018–2020)		IG	ISS	AIR ITALY	2018	2020	Previously Meridiana
Air Mach			KAM	ICO-AIR			
Air One		AP	ADH	HERON	1995	2014	Previously Aliadriatica
Air One CityLiner		CT	CYL	CITYLINER	2006	2011	Merged operations into Alitalia C.A.I in 2009 and rebranded Alitalia CityLiner in 2011
Air Sal-Linee Aeree Campane		9B			2005	2005	Operated with third party AOC
Air Sardinia		VV	ASZ		1986	1994	
Air Service Plus			AXY		2003	2008	
Air Sicilia		BM	SIC	AIR SICILIA	1991	2002	
Air Umbria			UMB	AIR UMBRIA	1993	2014	Operated Douglas DC-3
Air Vallée		VK	RVL	AIR VALLEE	1988	2018	
AirSud					2016	2016	
Ala Littoria					1934	1943	Formed through merger of SAM-Società Aerea Mediterranea, SANA, and SISA. Flag carrier of Italy in fascist years. Integrated into the air force after the start of WWII.
A.L.I.-Flotte Riunite					1949	1952	Formed by the merger of Airone, Avio Linee Italiane;, S.I.S.A, and Transadriatica
Aliadriatica		AP	ADH	HERON	1983	1995	Renamed Air One
Aliblu Airways		KR	KRO	ALIBLU	1987	1989	Operated two Jetstream 31
Alieurope					2000	2002	Operated Eurocopter AS332 Super Puma
Aligiulia		RW	RWA	ALIGIULIA	1980	1986	Operated Nord 262 and leased Dart Herald
Alinord		DN	DNO		1986	1990	Previously CADABO Operated YAK-40, Fokker F28
Alisarda		IG	ISS	Alisarda	1964	1991	Renamed Meridiana
AlisCargo Airlines		CP	LSI	ALIS	2021	2022	Renamed MSC Air Cargo
Alistar					1990		Previously Milair Never operational
Alisud (Compagnia Aerea Meridionale)					1963	1964	Operated leased Carvair
Alitalia-Aerolinee Italiane Internazionali		AZ	AZA		1947	1957	Merged with LAI-Linee Aeree Italiane to form Alitalia-Linee Aeree Italiane
Alitalia-Linee Aeree Italiane		AZ	AZA	ALITALIA	1957	2008	Formed by the merger of LAI-Linee Aeree Italiane and Alitalia-Aerolinee Italiane Internazionali. Merged operations into Alitalia - Compagnia Aerea Italiana
Alitalia - Compagnia Aerea Italiana		AZ	AZA	ALITALIA	2009	2014	Merged operations into Alitalia - Società Aerea Italiana
Alitalia - Società Aerea Italiana		AZ	AZA	ALITALIA	2015	2021	Assets partly merged into ITA Airways
Alitalia Cargo		AZ	AZA	ALITALIA	1947	2009	
Alitalia CityLiner		CT	CYL	CITYLINER	2011	2024	Previously Air One CityLiner Merged operations into Alitalia - Compagnia Aerea Italiana
Alitalia Express		XM	SMX	ALIEXPRESS	1997	2015	Merged operations into Alitalia CityLiner
Alitalia TEAM		RD	NOV	ALITALIA TEAM	1996	2002	Merged operations into Alitalia-Linee Aeree Italiane
Aliway Airlines					2000	2000	Operated a leased Jetstream 31
Alpi Eagles		E8	ELG	ALPI EAGLES	1996	2008	
Altair		SM	SMI	SIERRA MIKE	1981	1986	Operated Sud Aviation Caravelle
Antares Airlines						1987	Never operational Transformed into Unifly Express
Assofly Airlines					1999	1999	
Avianova		RD	NOV	AVIANOVA	1987	1996	Merged operations into Alitalia Team
Avio Linee Italiane-A.L.I.		AV		AVIOLINEE	1926	1949	Re-established after WWII. Merged to form A.L.I.-Flotte Riunite
Avioligure		TF			1976	1980	Took over Aertirrena assets Operated YAK-40
Avion Express Italia					2011	2011	Short-lived Lithuanian Avion Express affiliate
Aviosarda		DF	ADZ	AVIOSARDA	1994	2000	Operated a single leased ATR 42
Azzurra Air		ZS	AZI	AZZURRA	1996	2004	
B
Belle Air Europe		L9	BAL	BELLEAIR EUROPE	2010	2013	
Benair International Freight			BEI		1998	1999	
Besit-Air Besit					1989	2001	Merged into Air Columbia
Blue Panorama Airlines		BV	BPA	BLUE PANORAMA	1998	2021	
C
Cadabo		KB		CADABO	1983	1986	Renamed Alinord Operated YAK-40
Cargoitalia		2G	CRG	CARGOITALIA	2006	2011	
Ciao Fly			CIO		2002	2002	Operated leased BAe.146
CityFly			CII	CITYFLY	1999	1999	Previously Umbria Fly
Club Air		6P	ISG	ITALCARGO	2002	2008	
C.I.E.-Compagnia Italiana Elicotteri					1956	1969	Operated Agusta-Bell 47 Summer scheduled services Rimini-San Marino 1959-1969
Columbia					1883	1986	Operated Dart Herald
D
Dolphin Air Express					2004	2004	
E
Eagles Airlines		E3	EGS	EAGLES	2010	2011	Renamed PRiMA Aero Trasporti Italiani
Easy Islands					2002	2004	Operated leased aircraft
EGO Airways		E3	EGW	EGOL	2020	2021	
ELI-Linee Italiane					1956	1959	Renamed Elivie
Elipadana-Società Alta Italia Trasporto Elicotteri					1959	1961	Operated Sikorsky S-58 leased from Sabena
Elivie-Società Italiana Esercizio Elicotteri		EV		EIVIE	1959	1971	Previously ELI-Linee Italiane
Ernest Airlines		EG	ERN	ERNEST	2017	2020	
EuReCa		F4			1983	2001	
Eurofly		GJ	EEZ	E-FLY	1990	2010	Merged operations into Meridiana with Meridiana fly brand
Eurojet Italia			ERJ	JET ITALIA	1987	2007	Renamed Air4
Evolavia					2002	2007	
Executive Aviation Services			GDM		1993	2005	Operated Canadair CL-600, Hawker 700, Learjet 35
Executive Blue					2009	2014	Blue Panorama Airlines brand Operated Piaggio P.180 Avanti
F
Far Airlines					1994	1998	Requested regional routes never authorized
Federico II Airways		2D	FDE		1998	2001	
Fly Ernest					2015	2017	Renamed Ernest Airlines
Fly Marche					2017	2017	Flight operated by Van Air Europe with Let Turbolet
Fly Wex		IM	IAD	FLYWEX	2004	2007	Previously SixCargo
FlyOristano					2010	2011	
Fortune Aviation			FOR		1979	1993	Airline-type operations transferrd to Noman subsidiary
Foxair			FXR	WILDFOX	1995	2009	Merged into K-Air
FreeAir Helicopters			FRH	FREEAIR COPTER	1996	2001	Aerial work and public transport
G
Gandalf Airlines		G7	GNF	GANDALF	1999	2004	
Gitanair		VG	GTA	GITANAIR	1989	1990	
Goldwing Airlines		EE	GDW		2000	2002	Operated with third party AOC
H
Helisirio			HSL	HELISIRIO			
Helitalia			HIT	HELITALIA			
I
Idrolines					2009	2011	Seaplane services
INAER Aviation Italia					1978	2016	Rebranded Babcock MCS Italia
International Flying Services (IFS)		F4	IFS	EURECA	1989	1998	Previously Flying Services Renamed EuReCa
Interstate Airlines		I4			2005		Operated with third party AOC
Italair		B8	DRG	ITALAIR	1997	2000	
ItAli Airlines		FS	ACL	ITALI	2004	2011	Previously TAI-Trasporti Aerei Italiani
Italjet		QJ	ITJ	ITALJET	1990	1992	
Italy First		IF	IFS	RIVIERA	1999	2006	
Itavia-Società di Navigazione Aerea Itavia		IH	IHS	ITAVIA	1958	1980	
J
K
K-Air			FXR		2009	2018	Previously Foxair
L
LAI-Linee Aeree Italiane					1947	1957	Merged with Aerolinee Italiane Internazionali to form Alitalia-Linee Aeree Italiane
LAS-Linee Aeree Siciliane					1989		Virtual airline operating with Unifly Express aircraft
LATI					1939	1941	Flights discontinued in 1941, but company existed until 1956
Lauda Air Italy		L4	LDI	LAUDA ITALY	1993	2005	Transferred operations and fleet to Livingston Energy Flight
Livingston Compagnia Aerea-New Livingston SpA		JN	NLV	SEAGULL	2012	2014	New Livingston brand
Livingston Energy Flight-Livingston SpA		LM	LVG	LIVINGSTON	2003	2010	
Lufthansa Italia		LU	LIT	LUFTHANSA	2009	2011	
M
Med Airlines		M8	MDS	MIZAR	1997	2001	
Mediteravia-Mediterranea SpA					1959	1961	Operated a single Vickers Viking
1st Meridiana (1991–2010)		IG	ISS	MERIDIANA	1991	2018	Previously Alisarda Renamed 1st Air Italy
2nd Meridiana (2013–2018)		IG	ISS		2013	2018	Rebranded Air Italy (2018–2020)
Meridiana Fly		IG	ISS		2010	2018	Trading name of Meridiana (1991–2010) and Eurofly Merged with Air Italy (2005–2018) to form 2nd Meridiana (2013–2018)
Milair		2Q			1990	1992	Operated Yakovlev Yak-40, Yakovlev Yak-42. Renamed Alistar
Minerva Airlines		N4	MTC	AIR MINERVA	1996	2003	
MiniLiner			MNL	MINILINER	1982	2015	
Mistral Air		M4	MSA	AIRMERCI	1984	2019	Renamed Poste Air Cargo
MyAir-My Way Airlines		8I	MYW	FRANKY	2004	2009	
MyJet					2015	2016	Bought by Blink
N
National Jet Italia					2000	2001	Operated B.737 and BAe.146 leased from British Airways
Noman		U4	NOM	NOMAN	1994	1997	Fortune Aviation subsidiary Operations transferred to AirOne
O
Ocean Airlines		VC	VCX	OCEAN CARGO	2004	2007	
P
Panair		P2	PIT	PANAIRFLY	2001	2003	Previously Panair International
Posta Aerea Transadriatica					1918	1919	
PRiMA Aero Trasporti Italiani		E3	EGS	EAGLES	2011	2011	Previously Eagles Airlines
S
Sagittair		SG	SGT		1990	1991	Previously Aerotaxi Sud
Salpanavi-Società di Navigazione Aerea					1947	1948	Merged operations into Aerea Teseo
1st SAM-Società Aerea Mediterranea			MQ		1928	1939	Merged to form Ala Littoria
2nd SAM-Società Aerea Mediterranea			MQ		1961	1977	Alitalia charter subsidiary
Samanta			CDF	SAMANTA			
SANA-Società Anonima Navigazione Aerea					1926	1934	Merged to form Ala Littoria
Sardairline			SAP	SARDAIR	1994	2000	
SATT-Società Avio Trasporti Torino					1962	1968	Charters, mainly cargo
SAV-Società Aerea Veneziana					1969	1972	Not operational Assets sold to Aeropa
Serib Wings		IF	ISW	SERIB	1988	1996	Operated Swearingen Metroliner
Si Fly		S6	KWY	SIFLY	1999	2001	
1st SISA-Società Italiana Servizi Aerei					1923	1934	Merged to form Ala Littoria
2nd SISA-Società Italiana Servizi Aerei					1947	1948	Merger operations into Avio Linee Italiane and later into A.L.I.-Flotte Riunite
SixCargo		6P	ISG		2001	2004	Renamed Fly Wex
SkyBridge Airops			KYB		2005	2014	Operated Embraer Brasilia
SmartLynx Italia		6Y	ART		2009	2010	SmartLynx Airlines subsidiary
Sunline					1993	1994	
T
TAI-Transporti Aerei Italiani					2003	2004	Previously Air Columbia Renamed ItAli Airlines
TAS Airways		TJ	TTS		1987	1994	Trading name of Trasporti Aerei Speciali airline-type operations
TEA Italia					1990	1995	Associated with TEA Trans European Airways
1st Transadriatica-Società Anonima di Navigazione Aerea Transadriatica					1926	1931	Merged into Società Aerea Mediterranea
2nd Transadriatica-Società Transadriatica di Navigazione Aerea p.A.					1947	1949	Merged to form A.L.I.-Flotte Riunite
Transavia					1961	1962	Specialised in the transport of newspapers in Italy
Transavio		TD	TVO	TRANS-BALLERIO	1981	1995	Mainly scheduled passenger summer service to Elba Island
Turavia Linee Aeree Turistiche					1971	1971	Briefly operated Fokker F28
U
Unifly (Unifly Express)					1976	1987	Operated Fokker F28 on charter flights
Unifly Express		IP	BJA	UNIFLY	1988	1990	Previously Antares Airlines
V
Victoria Airlines					1998	1998	Operated Airbus A320 with third party AOC
VIP-Air			VIT	VIPAIR	1967	1990	Aero-taxi company Operated a regional route 1981-1982
Volare and Volareweb.com		VA	VLE	REVOLA	1998	2015	Reformed in 2006 as Volare SpA In 2009 merged operations into Alitalia - Compagnia Aerea Italiana In 2015 merged operations into Alitalia - Società Aerea Italiana
VoliRegionali					2005	2005	
W
Wind Jet		IV	JET	GHIBLI	2003	2012	
Y
Yes Air					2005	2005	Briefly operated a leased ATR 42

== Further informations ==
In 1997 the Italian aviation monthly JP4 also listed these companies (years 1972–2007):

1 - project or proposal only: 4Air, Adria, Aer Tuscia (or Air Tuscia), Agent Air, Air Corse Italy, Air Freedom, Air Piemont, Ali Adria (renamed SAT-Società Aerea Triveneta), Ali del Sole, Ali Liguria, Alisicilia, Assofly, Aviosud, Brixia, Cargo Airways, CAT-Compagnia Aerea Triveneta, EAS Italia, Emilia Romagna, Fly Connection, G7, Galileo Airways, Italianwings, LTI, Mediterranea, Meridiana Express, Milair, Partnair, Ocean Airlines (1998), Phoenix, Puglia Air, Solair, Southwest Express, Transeuropa,Urbe Airlines, Wing

2 - established but never operational (dates): Air Blu (2002–2006), Alicalabria (2002), Antares (1976), ArtAir (2000), Avialpi (1972), Blue Line (2001–2002), Par Avion (1994), SATEL (1980–1982), SAV-Società Aerea Veneta (1972, Aeropa from 1973), Sicilian Airways (1980), 1st Sunline (1988), TAER (1977)

3 - operated with third party AOC: Allway Airlines (2000), Blue Air (2003–2004), Free Airways (2002), LAS-Linee Aeree Siciliane (1987–1989), Uniroyal International (1998–1999)

== See also ==
- List of airlines of Italy
