= EuReCa =

Italian airline

IATA	ICAO	Call sign
F4	—	—
- Founded: 1983
- Ceased operations: 2001
- Hubs: Bergamo
- Key people: Cesare Musumeci founder
- Website: www.eureca.it

European Regional Carrier SpA (doing business as EuReCa) was an airline based in Italy. Active in the transport of goods and charter flights, for a certain period it also operated regular domestic connections.

== History ==
The company's origins date back to Flying Services, established in 1983 to provide air taxi and small-scale charter services. It also began transporting mall and medium-sized cargo. In 1989, it changed its name to International Flying Services. Among its clients to be serviced within Italy were major couriers such as DHL, UPS, SDA, and Airborne Express. In 1991, the first passenger charters were carried out with a 19-seater Swearingen Metroliner towards Eastern Europe, Cyprus, and Tunisia. The air taxi unit was equipped with a Beechcraft King Air 200 and a Beechjet 400. In March 1993, it obtained its AOC certificate from ENAC (Italian civil aviation authority). The following May, it began scheduled flights to the island of Elba with a 19-seater German-built Dornier 228, but these were discontinued at the end of the summer. Despite the support of some municipal administrations and some tourist associations, traffic overall proved to be lower than expected.

Since 1996, maintenance of various aircraft types, including the Dornier 328, both standard and jet-powered versions, was carried out at the technical base at Bergamo's Orio al Serio airport (customers included fellow airlines Air Vallée and Gandalf Airlines). During these years, only charter flights were carried out, many for third parties, until the end of December 1997, when all flight operations were suspended. However, the hiatus was brief, as in January 1998 the airline changed its name to EuReCa-European Regional Carrier, a declaration of its intentions. The airline's home base remained at Bergamo's Orio al Serio airport. Building on its accumulated experience and the results achieved (34,000 passengers in 1997), the airline resumed flights to the island of Elba, again with the robust and versatile Do.228. The growth in traffic and the positive outlook prompted the company to equip itself with an even larger aircraft, the Fokker F27, also suitable for short-haul charter flights. This twin-engine aircraft opened routes from Pescara to Milan and Turin, and from Turin to Alghero. In 2000 the Dutch turboprop was replaced by a leased ATR 42.

Meanwhile, the already well-established cargo business was taking on new dimensions: through collaboration agreements, EuReCa was able to provide increasingly larger aircraft for charter transport. For example, with the all-cargo Antonov 74, the Tupolev 154M (also in a passenger version), and the even more imposing Ilyushin 76. Partners in Eastern Europe included the Russian airlines Gazpromavia, Kras Air, and Krylo. The air taxi business continued, while ancillary activities such as ad hoc rentals, in-flight and ground handling services, and the representation of foreign entities were also developed. EuReCa had also joined a collaboration program with Médecins Sans Frontières, a well-known international humanitarian organization.

However, this oscillation between passenger and cargo flights prevented the airline from establishing a clear identity. The financial results, in the end, were always negative, and the company experienced a sudden and unexpected decline. After operating scheduled flights again in the summer of 2000, all operations were gradually closed between 2001 and 2002.

== Destinations ==
IFS and later EuReCa connected these following cities/airports at different times and different frequencies:

Italy

- Milan (Linate)
- Turin (Caselle)
- Alghero (Fertilia)
- Pescara (Abruzzo)
- Bergamo (Orio al Serio)
- Rimini (Miramare)
- Olbia (Costa Smeralda) seasonal
- Elba Island (Marina di Campo)

== See also ==
- List of defunct airlines of Italy
