= Marghera =

Comune of Venice, Italy

Coordinates: 45°27′41″N 12°13′22″E

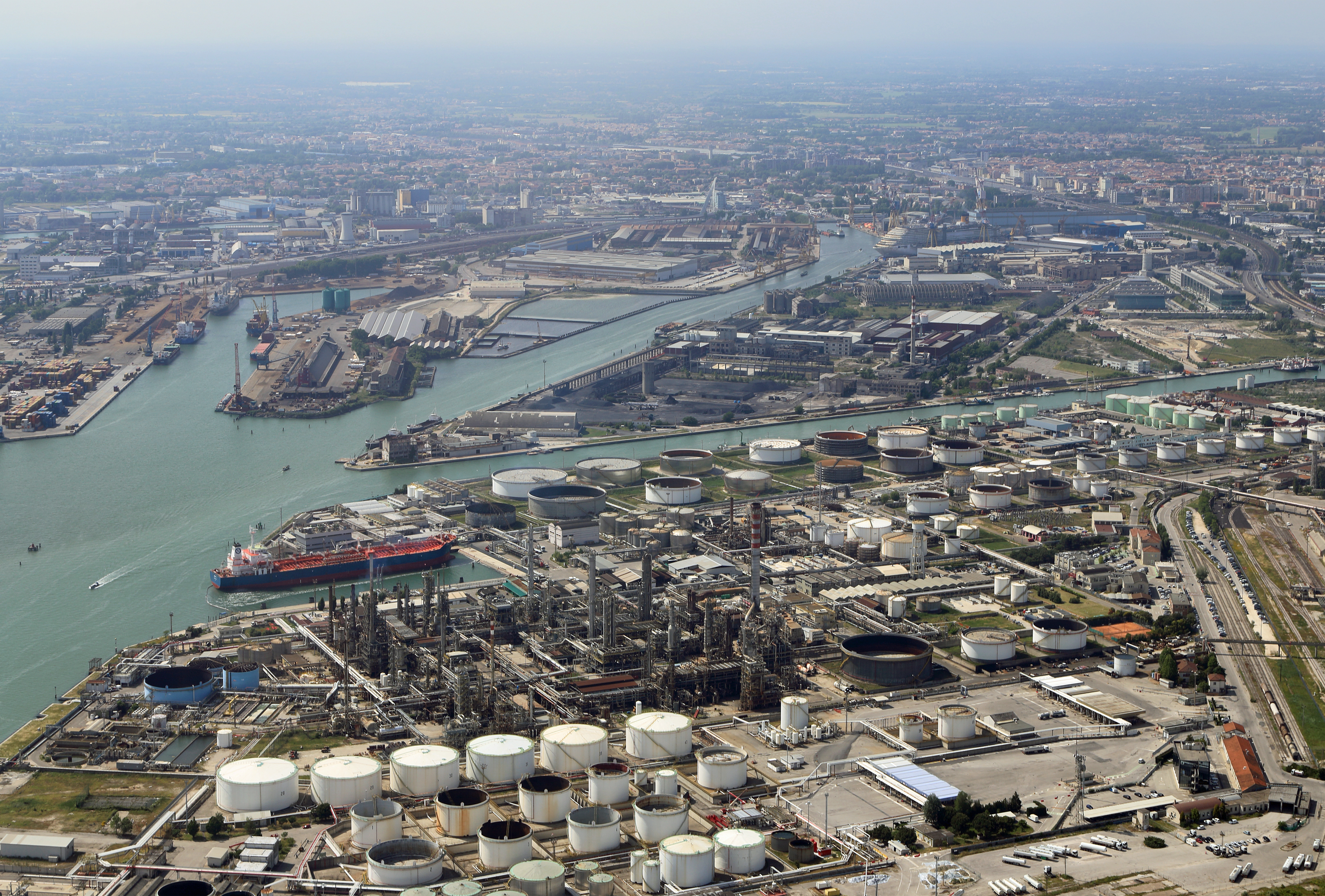
Porto Marghera

Marghera is a municipalità (borough) of the comune of Venice, Italy. It includes the industrial area known as Porto Marghera (English: Marghera Port) or Venezia Porto Marghera.

== Etymology ==
The name Marghera is said in popular myth to come from Venetian dialectal "Mar gh' era," meaning "There was the sea"; the original form, however, was Mergaria, whose origin is unclear.

== History ==
Before the construction of the port and the residential district, the area was mostly marshy, known as Bottenighi. Its only streets were Via Catene, which continued from Via del Parroco to Chirignago, and Via Bottenigo, which from Via Catene disappeared into the salt marsh. Where Via Fratelli Bandiera is today, there was a large drainage canal (of which the current road was the embankment) that reached the Malcontenta; it was part of the hydraulic complex consisting of the large levee, built in the 14th century, which collected the waters of the Brenta Vecchia and other waterways south of the Canal Salso and diverted them away from Venice, through the mouth of the Brenta Resta d'Aio (near Fusina).

The toponym "Marghera" (formerly "Malghera") instead referred to a small village located on the banks of the Canal Salso, in today's San Giuliano di Mestre. It consisted of a few houses, a church, and several warehouses intended to serve as a customs post along the aforementioned canal for goods bound for and from Venice. In 1805, the Habsburg Empire decided to build a large defensive complex on the site of the village, razing it to the ground but keeping its name. Forte Marghera, which still exists today, was the inspiration for the choice of name for the new residential neighborhood and adjacent industrial area in the 1920s.

At the beginning of the 20th century Venice's existing port at Bacino San Marco was incapable of servicing large modern ships. A new port was constructed at the western end of Venice at Stazione Marittima, but it became clear that if industry was developed in its immediate vicinity it would negatively impact on the historical city and tourism. As a result, by 1917 – during the First World War – the Italian government decided to develop an industrial zone and state-of-the-art port at Marghera on the mainland, opposite Venice and near the town of Mestre. A major backer of the scheme was Count Giuseppe Volpi.

Development commenced in 1920, and for 10 years shipping channels were dredged, excavations and land reclamation took place. A residential area was constructed for the zone's workers. In 1923, the first chemical factory commenced production. The number of workers employed in the zone rose to 6000 by 1930, 16,000 by 1950 and 35,000 by 1970.

In 1926 Marghera and Mestre were made a frazione under the control of the municipal government of Venice. By 1940, more than 60 factories were established at Marghera, and as a result during World War II Allied bombers targeted Porto Marghera.

On May 15, 2020, a fire in a chemical plant producing cosmetics, including nail varnish remover, forced Venetians to stay indoors.

== Population ==
The Municipalità di Marghera, one of the six boroughs of Venice's comune, includes 30,000 inhabitants, with Marghera alone including 17,000 inhabitants.

== Economy ==
The Enichem fertilizer company operates in Marghera.

Eagles Airlines had its head office in Marghera.

3V Sigma, part of the multinational Sigma corporation, has a chemical plant producing cosmetics in Porto Maghera; it had a chemical fire in May 2020.

== Bibliography ==
- Madden, Thomas F (2012). Venice : A New History (Hardback). New York: Viking. ISBN 978-0-670-02542-8.
