= Blue Panorama Airlines =

Airline based in Fiumicino, Italy

Blue Panorama Airlines Luke Air
IATA	ICAO	Call sign
BV	BPA	BLUE PANORAMA
- Founded: September 1998
- Commenced operations: 26 December 1998
- Ceased operations: 27 October 2021
- Operating bases: Rome Fiumicino airport; Milan Malpensa airport
- Focus cities: Rome Fiumicino airport; Milan Malpensa airport; Bergamo
- Alliance: Ukraine International Airlines
- Parent company: Gruppo UVET
- Headquarters: Fiumicino, Rome, Italy
- Key people: Franco Pecci President 1998-2017 Luca Patanè President from 2017
- Net income: €2.7 Million (2018)
- Employees: 624 (in 2020)
- Website: www.blue-panorama.com

Blue Panorama Airlines was an Italian scheduled and charter airline founded in Rome in 1998. Its main bases were Rome-Fiumicino and Milan-Malpensa airports. It operated charter flights, primarily in conjunction with trips organized by the tour operator Settemari. Under the Blu-express brand, it also operated medium- and short-haul low-cost flights. Business flights uwere operated under Executive Blue brand. Due to financial constraints, it ceased operations on October 27, 2021.

== History ==
=== The beginning ===
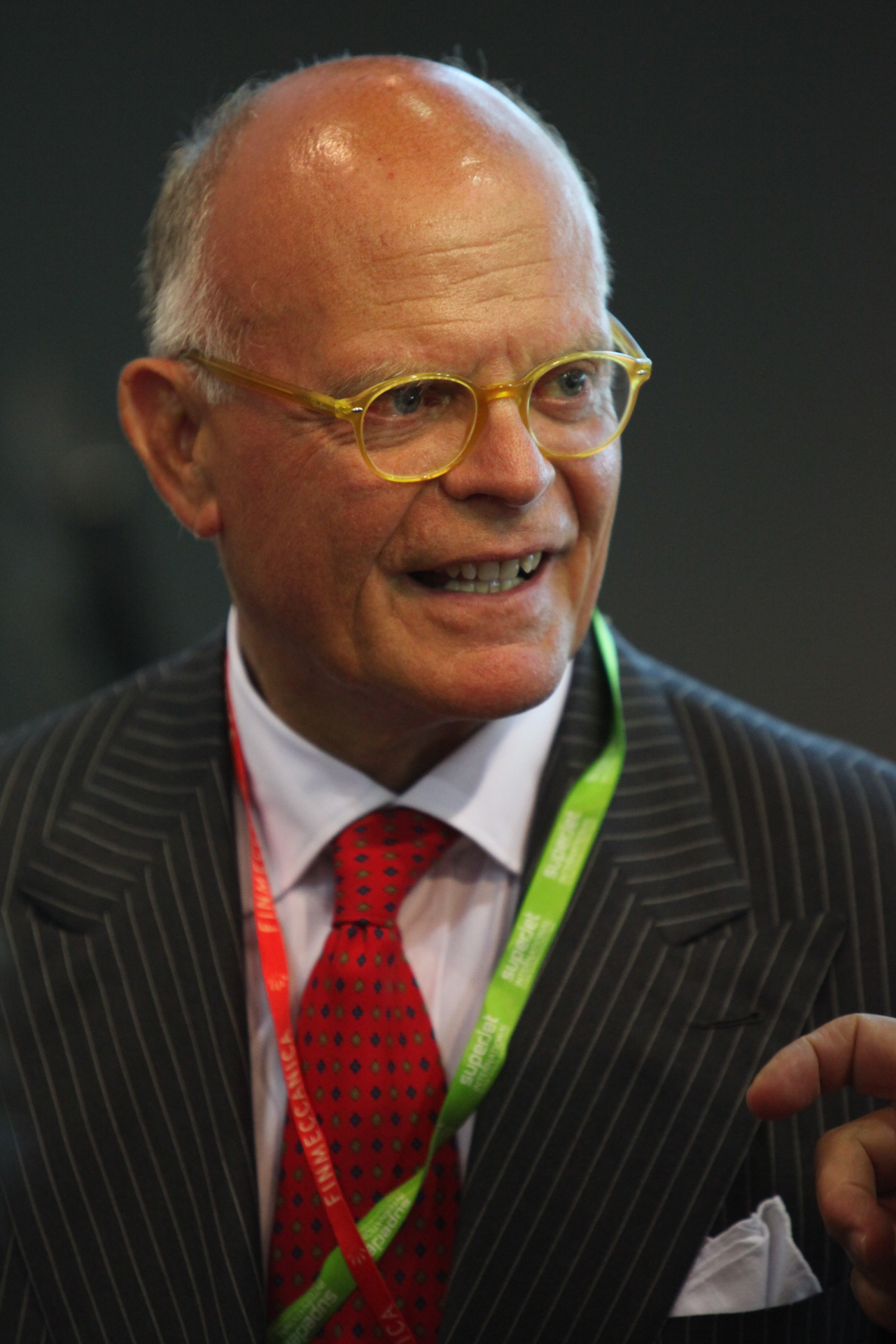
Franco Pecci in 2011

Blue Panorama Airlines S.p.A. was a privately owned airline. It was founded in Rome in September 1998 by Franco Pecci, Sandro Giulianelli, and Antonio De Ponti. At first it operated in cooperation with Astra Travel, a Rome-based tour operator. The company's purpose was to fly intercontinental, international, and domestic charter flights for tour operators, companies, and private customers.

Blue Panorama established operating bases at Rome-Fiumicino "Leonardo da Vinci" Airport and Milan-Malpensa Airport airports. Flights began at the end of December with two Boeing 737s. Charters related to religious pilgrimages, such as those carried out for Pastoraltour, were also of a certain importance. Scheduled flights began in September 2000, with a first one, a biweekly to Ukrainian capital Kiev and, immediately after, to Barcelona. The airline was admitted to IATA membership in 2002. The first Boeing 767-300ERs were delivered in 2002. In that same year, the air carrier ownership passed to the Distal & ITR Group (66.6%), owned by Franco Pecci family.

=== Low-cost subsidiary ===
Since November 2005, some Boeing 737s operated under the low-cost brand Blu-Express from Rome and Milan, both domestically and internationally, to around twenty destinations, some of which were seasonal.

Between 2011 and 2012, Blue Panorama attracted interest from Alitalia. The proposed acquisition raised concerns from ENAC (Italian civil aviation authority) due to the alleged risk of a dominant position. In April 2012, the failure to reach an integration agreement was announced. On 25 November 2013, Blu-express started flights from Italy to Tirana International Airport Nënë Tereza after Belle Air ceased operations.

Partly due to this unexpected situation, the company ran into difficulties in 2012 and, after a period of bankruptcy proceedings, was placed under extraordinary administration by the Rome Court in 2014. The management of the airline was left to the company's founder Franco Pecci. After a couple of unsuccessful sales attempts, at the end of 2017 Blue Panorama was acquired by UVET Group, which had previously acquired Settemari. In 2019, UVET announced that it would purchase several Airbus A330-200s for the subsidiary to replace its Boeing 767-300ERs. In October of the same year, Blue Panorama announced that it would change its identity, taking on the name Luke Air by the end of the year. A new livery was painted on the first Airbus A330-200, received in March 2020, while a second aircraft arrived in November. In October, the UVET Group received a €uros 45 million government compensation fund.

=== The name change leads to nothing ===
In January 2021, it was announced that the rebrand would go ahead. As of September, the airline's official website had its content changed to Luke Air operated by Blue Panorama Airlines. However, the general situation had reached a point of uncontrollability. On October 27, 2021, Blue Panorama suspended all flight operations stating financial difficulties in the wake of the COVID-19 pandemic. The Milan Court admitted the airline to a composition with creditors procedure. The carrier was given until February 28, 2022, to find a solution. In June 2022, it was reported that the grounded airline had retired both of their Airbus A330-200s. In September, ENAC extended the suspension of its Air Operator's Certificate (AOC) until March 2023, but on December 15, the Milan Court issued a decree of "inadmissibility to the composition with creditors procedure", effectively ending the company's history. It was announced that the airline would be liquidated and not resume operations.

== Destinations ==
At the beginning of 2021, Blue Panorama Airlines operated to 41 destinations from both its main hub, Rome-Fiumicino "Leonardo da Vinci" Airport, and other Italian airports:

- Africa: Cape Verde, Kenya, Madagascar, Senegal, Tanzania.
- Caribbeans: Bahamas, Cuba (Avana, Cayo Largo, Holguin, Santa Clara, Santiago), Dominican Republic (La Romana), Jamaica (Montego Bay), Mexico (Cancun).
- Middle East: Egypt.
- Europe: Albania, Greece (Corfu, Crete, Kefalonia, Kos, Mykonos, Preveza, Rhodes, Santorini, Skiathos, Zakyntos), Russia (Moscow), Spain (Ibiza, Minorca, Palma de Mallorca), Turkey (Bodrum).

Blu-express operated a network of Italian domestic destinations: Bari, Catania, Lampadusa Island, Milan, Palermo, Pantelleria Island, Reggio di Calabria, Rome, Turin.

=== Codeshare agreements ===
Blue Panorama Airlines maintained Codeshare agreements with the following airlines:

- Albawings
- Cubana de Aviación

== Fleet ==
As of November 2022, the fleet included no aircraft. The following types have been operated in previous years:

Aircraft	Total	Image	Introduced	Retired	Remarks
Airbus A330-200	2		2019	2022	in the proposed Luke Air livery
ATR 72-200	1		2015	2015	leased from Avanti Air
Boeing 737-300	2		2000	2000	leased from Sterling European Airlines
Boeing 737-300	2		2002	2003	leased from Ukraine International Airlines
Boeing 737-300	1		2015	2020	Operated with bluexpress titles
Boeing 737-400	16		1999	2020	some leased from Air Horizont and Hapag-Lloyd Flug 2 operated with bluexpress titles
Boeing 737-500	1		2013	2016	
Boeing 737-800	10		2000	2022	
Boeing 757-200	2		2005	2012	
Boeing 767-300ER	10		2002	2020	
Piaggio P.180 Avanti	3		2009	2014	Operated under the "Executive Blue" brand.

== Accidents and incidents ==
- On 16 July 2004, a Boeing 767-300ER operating as Flight 1504 experienced an uncontained engine failure on takeoff from Rome-Fiumicino Airport. The plane returned and conducted a successful emergency landing. Investigation revealed that a high-pressure fuel hose leaked approximately 700 kilograms (1,500 lb) of fuel into the engine's nacelle during taxi, which ignited upon takeoff.
- On 22 September 2018, a Blue Panorama Spanish pilot, Emilio Leone, was arrested by Albanian police as his colleagues reported him for trying to fly the aircraft intoxicated.

== In popular culture ==
- A Blue Panorama Boeing 757-200 and Boeing 767-300ER appeared in John Legend's music video for "Show Me".

== See also ==
- List of defunct airlines of Italy
