= Ernest Airlines =

Italian airline

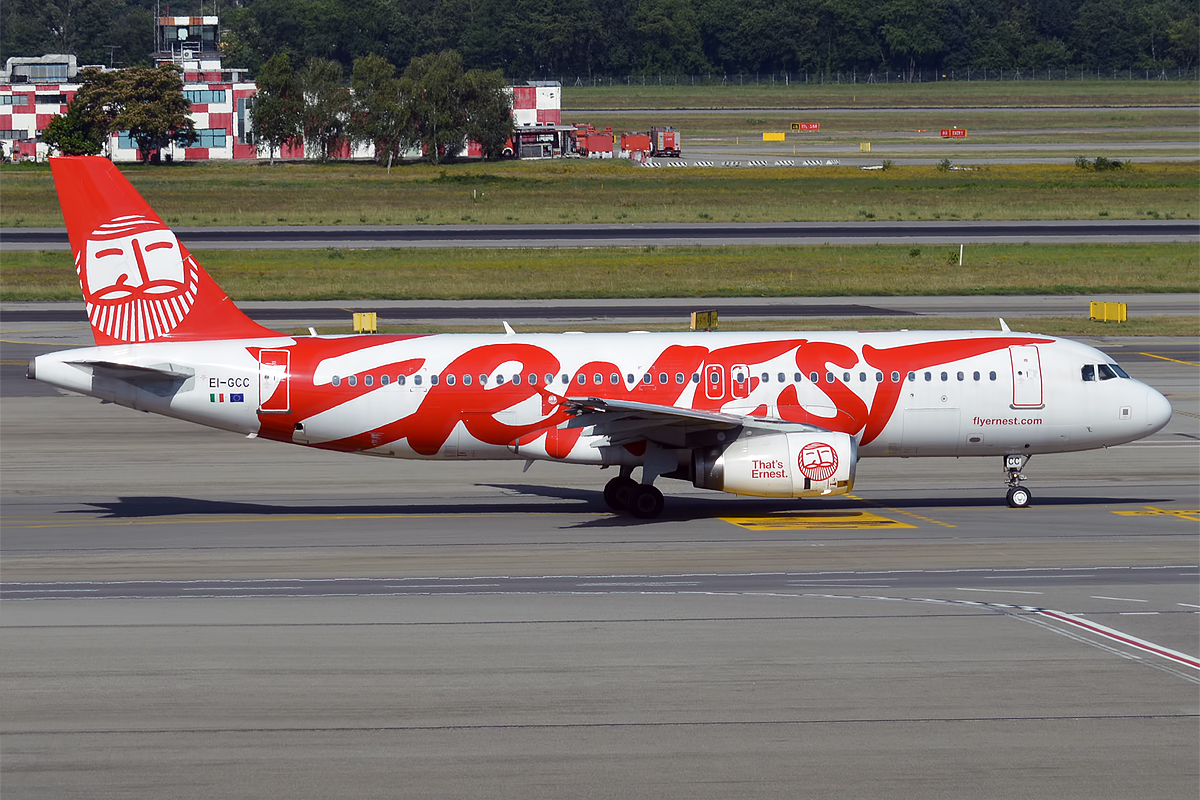
- Airbus A320-200
IATA	ICAO	Call sign
EG	ERN	ERNEST
- Founded: 16 October 2015
- Commenced operations: 1 July 2016
- Ceased operations: 10 January 2020
- Hubs: Milan Malpensa Airport
- Headquarters: Milan, Italy
- Key people: Chady El Tannir
- Website: flyernest.com

Ernest Airlines (registered as Ernest S.p.A.) was an Italian low-cost carrier, headquartered in Milan. The airline briefly operated a fleet of Airbus A320 family aircraft to over 20 destinations, mainly from its main base at Milan Malpensa Airport. Operations commenced in July 2016, and ceased in January 2020.

== History ==
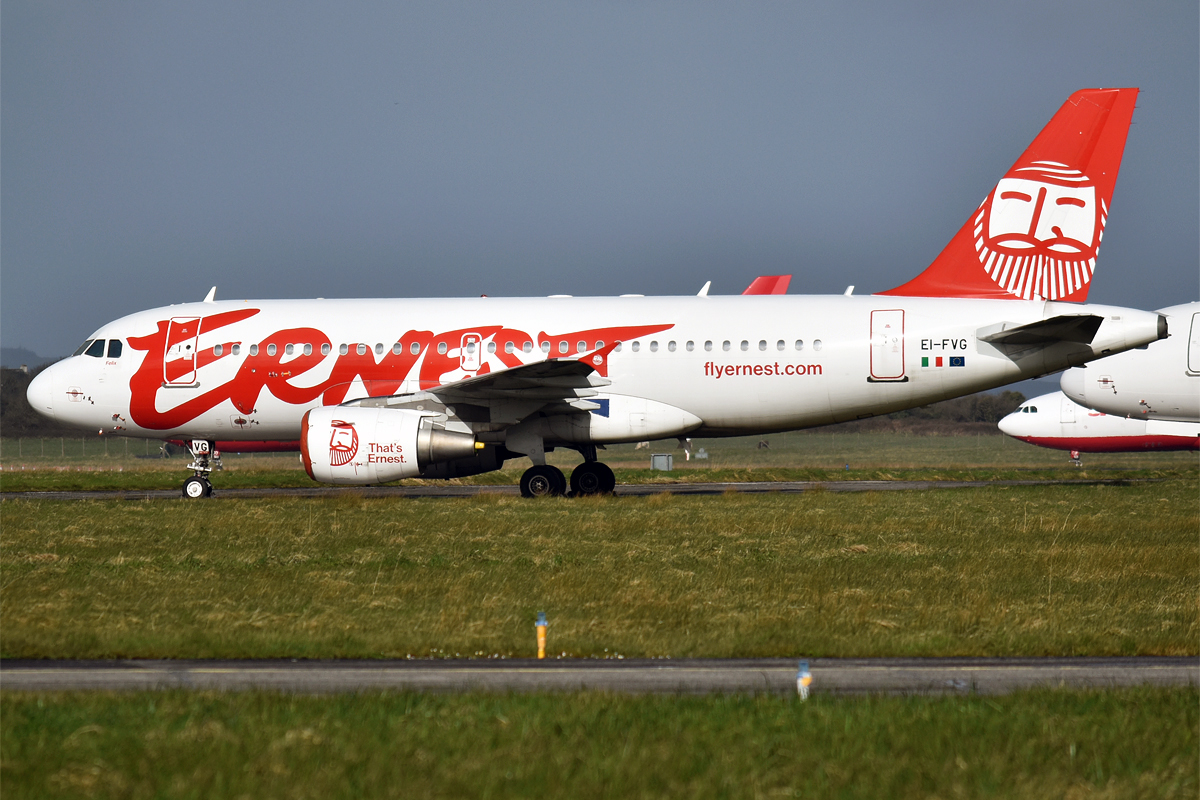
Airbus A319-100

Founded on 16 October 2015, Ernest Airlines was granted an AOC and an Operating License as an Italian Air Carrier on 11 April 2017. The company commenced operations as Fly Ernest serving the Italian-Albanian market, and entered the Ukrainian market on 20 October 2017. It has since also added destinations to Romania and Spain from Italy to its schedule. In 2017 the airline rebranded from Fly Ernest to Ernest Airlines. The company slogan was Fly with style in great company.

On 29 December 2019, the Italian Civil Aviation Authority announced that it would be suspending the airline's AOC on 13 January 2020 due to a lack of required guarantees. On 11 January, the airline fully suspended their operations. As of 11 August, the carrier announced plans to restart operations as a regional carrier pending governmental agreement; the plans included converting their fleet from an all-Airbus A320 family to ATR72-600s, to fly to over 70 destinations. The future resumption of services was due for consideration in the Milan Court in September 2020, but no services were resumed.

== Destinations ==
Ernest Airlines operated to over 20 destinations in 5 countries. The airline operated most of their flights out of their main hub at Milan–Malpensa Airport.

== Fleet ==
Ernest operated the following aircraft at the time of closure:

Ernest Airlines fleet
Aircraft	In service	Orders	Passengers	Notes
Airbus A319-100	1	—	141	
Airbus A320-200	3	3	180	
Total	4	4		

== See also ==
- List of defunct airlines of Italy
