= Alinord =

Italian airline

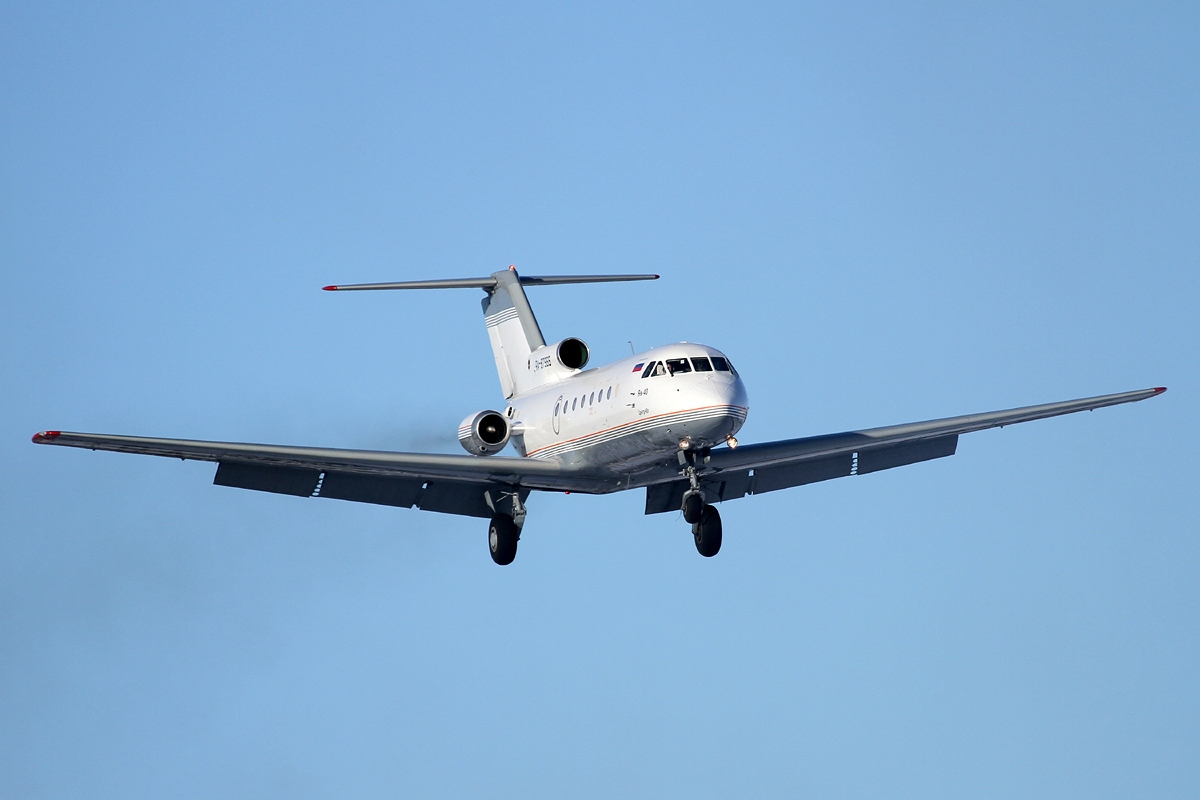
- Yak-40
- Founded: 1980 (as CADABO)
- Commenced operations: 1980 (as CADABO), 1986 as Alinord
- Ceased operations: June 1990
- Hubs: Rome, Milan
- Fleet size: 3
- Parent company: Unifly Express from January 1990
- Headquarters: Milan

Alinord is a small domestic charter airline based in Italy which also operated some scheduled routes for a short time before closing in 1990.

== History ==
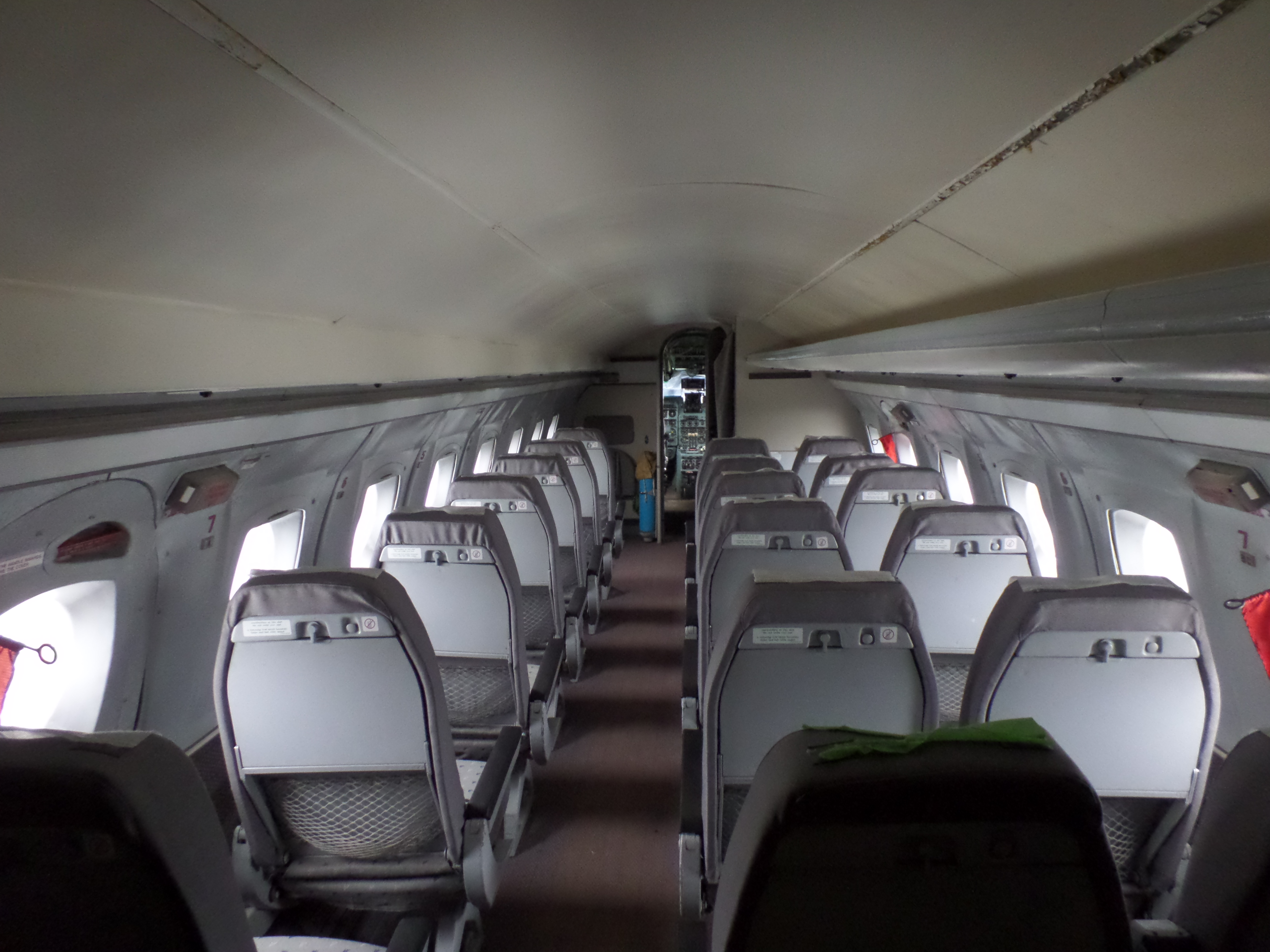
Yak-40 cabin

Previously known as CADABO, an acronym of the surnames of the founding pilots who took over a Yak 40 formerly owned by Avioligure and founded the company in Milan in 1980. After operating only charter flights, in July 1983 it managed to inaugurate the Bergamo-Rome Ciampino route and then the Perugia-Parma route. In 1985, it received a 300 million lire contribution from the Bastogi-Acqua Pia Marcia Group.

In 1986, it changed its name to the more appropriate Alinord and established operational bases at Milan Linate and Rome Ciampino airports. In 1989, the scheduled Milan-Perugia and Taranto Bergamo-Rome Ciampino-Taranto routes were established, but overall traffic performance was below expectations. Charter flights and third-party flights continued. In January 1990, the company was sold to Unifly Express, which had the intention of entrusting operation of secondary routes. However, all flight activities ceased in June 1990.

== Fleet ==
Cadabo and Alinord fleets consisted of the following aircraft:

- 2 x Fokker F28 leased by Alinord
- 2 x Yak-40 both transferred to Alinord for a short while
