= AXY =

AXY may refer to:

- Air Service Plus (ICAO: AXY), an Italian low cost airline
- AirX Charter (ICAO: AXY), a Maltese charter airline
- New Axis Airways (ICAO: AXY), a French airline
