= Club Air =

Italian airline

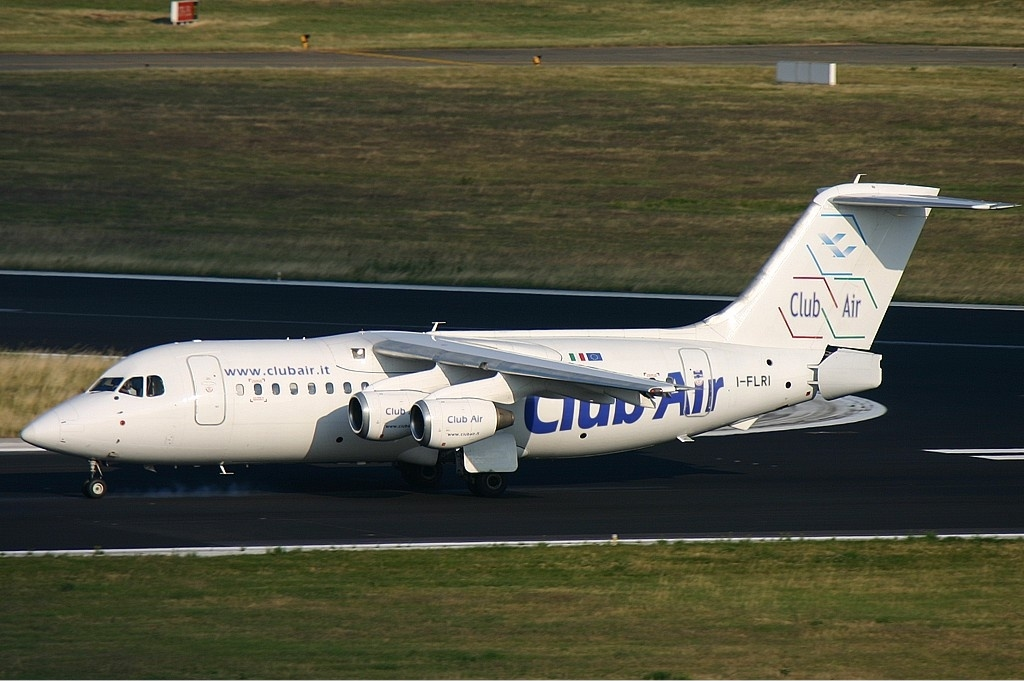
- Avro RJ85
IATA	ICAO	Call sign
6P	ISG	Italcargo
- Founded: 2002
- Ceased operations: 2008
- Hubs: Venice
- Alliance: SixCargo
- Headquarters: Verona, Italy

Club Air was an airline headquartered in Milan and based in Verona, Italy, operating domestic flights within Italy and international flights to Albania, France, Moldova, Kosovo, Romania and Ukraine. It had a hub at Verona Airport.

== History ==
The airline was originally established in October 2002 by Valsole Viaggi e Turismo tour operating company with its first flights the next month. The Italian civil aviation authority, ENAC, withdrew the airlines operating certificate on 12 December 2006. Services resumed under new owners and new management on May 2, 2007. This new venture was unsuccessful with operations ceasing on May 28, 2008.

== Destinations ==
The airline offered a combination of domestic services and services to Eastern Europe, trying to take advantage of migrant workers travelling to and from their countries of origin. Routes included those from Verona to Bucharest, Timișoara Bacău, Cluj-Napoca (Romania), Chişinău (Moldova), Pristina (Kosovo) Lviv (Ukraine) .

== Fleet ==
Club Air fleet
Aircraft	Total	Introduced	Retired	Remark
Avro RJ70	1	2007	2008	I-FASI
Avro RJ85	2	2005	2009	
BAe 146-200	5	2004	2007	
McDonnell Douglas MD-82	2	2007	2008	LZ-LDC, LZ-LDF operated by Bulgarian Air Charter

== See also ==
- List of defunct airlines of Italy
