= ItAli Airlines =

Italian airline based in Rome

IATA	ICAO	Call sign
FS	ACL	ITALI
- Founded: 1984 as Air Columbia renamed TAI-Trasporti Aerei Italiani rebranded ItAli Airlines in 2004
- Ceased operations: 11 March 2011
- Hubs: Leonardo da Vinci-Fiumicino International Airport
- Frequent-flyer program: ItAli Sky Pass
- Fleet size: 11
- Destinations: 5 (scheduled)
- Parent company: Aeroservices Group
- Headquarters: Rome, Italy
- Key people: Giuseppe Spadaccini
- Website: www.italiweb.it

ItAli Airlines S.p.A. was an airline based in Rome. It operated regional scheduled, charter and cargo services, as well as air taxi flights. Its main base was Leonardo da Vinci-Fiumicino International Airport, Rome.

== History ==
The air carrier had its origins in Air Columbia, established in 1984 in the city of Pescara, on the coast of the Adriatic Sea. Only air taxi activities were carried out by this company. It was wholly owned by Giuseppe Spadaccini, an Abruzzo businessman active in various sectors of aviation which he controlled through the financial company Aeroservices. After this entity acquired Air Besit in 2001, it decided to deploy its two Swearingen SA-227 Metroliners in a closer geographic area (Pescara) and begin scheduled flights to Rome and other Italian cities. In 2000, the entrepreneur felt the time had come for a broader transformation.

In 2003 TAI-Trasporti Aerei Italiani was born but it was a temporary solution. Between the end of 2003 and 2004 the new name ItAli Airlines was adopted. From October 2003 the air carrier linked Pescara Abruzzo Airport with important cities, connecting there with domestic and international flights. In particular, the daily flight to Milan-Linate Airport was operated by a Fairchild Swearingen Metroliner. Other flights were operated by a Dornier 328Jet regional airliner. Charter operations were flown with McDonnell Douglas MD-82s, primarily from Rome-Leonardo Da Vinci International Airport and Milan Malpensa Airport. The main destinations in the summer of 2010 were Samos, Lourdes, Lampedusa, Rhodes, and, above all, Tirana, with multiple weekly flights. On 16 December of the same year, the airline began RomeLeonardo Da Vinci International Airport-Genoa and Genoa-Paris-Charles de Gaulle Airport flights.

In early summer 2009 the airline's air taxi arm was established, with a hub at Rome Ciampino Airport and a secondary base at Milan-Linate Airport. Executive flights were operated under MustFly brand, whose aircraft were well placed under ItAli Airlines AOC. The fleet included two Dornier 328JETs, those previously used on scheduled flights, specially reconfigured with 19 seats accommodation.

On 21 October 2010, following investigations conducted by the Pescara tax police unit of the Guardia di Finanza ("Operation Flying Money"), Giuseppe Spadaccini was arrested along with 12 other people for a massive international tax evasion scheme involving €uros 90 million. He was allegedly the mastermind and organizer of a network of companies involved in tax evasion between Italy and the island of Madeira. On 11 March 2011, ENAC (Italian civil aviation authority) suspended the AOC due to the persistence of some air carrier critical issues.

== Destinations ==
During winter season 2010, ItAli Airlines operated from the following hubs:

Italy

- Genoa - Genoa Airport
- Milan - Linate Airport
- Reggio Calabria - Reggio Calabria Airport
- Rome - Leonardo Da Vinci International Airport

France

- Paris - Charles de Gaulle Airport

== Fleet ==
The ItAli Airlines fleet consisted of the following aircraft types:

Aircraft	Image	Total	Introduced	Retired	Remarks
Airbus A320-200		1	2006	2007	Leased
Cessna Citation Mustang		3	2009	2011	Previously operated by Air Columbia
Fairchild Dornier 328JET		2	2004	2011	
McDonnell Douglas MD-82		5	2005	2011	
Fairchild Swearingen Metroliner SA-227		2	2003	2011	Previously operated by Air Columbia

ItAli Airlines had placed an order for 10 Sukhoi Superjet 100-95 aircraft which were expected to be in service around mid-2010, plus 10 options. However, in January 2011, the contract had been dropped from the order book list.

== See also ==
- List of defunct airlines of Italy
