= Air Vallée =

Italian charter and regional airline

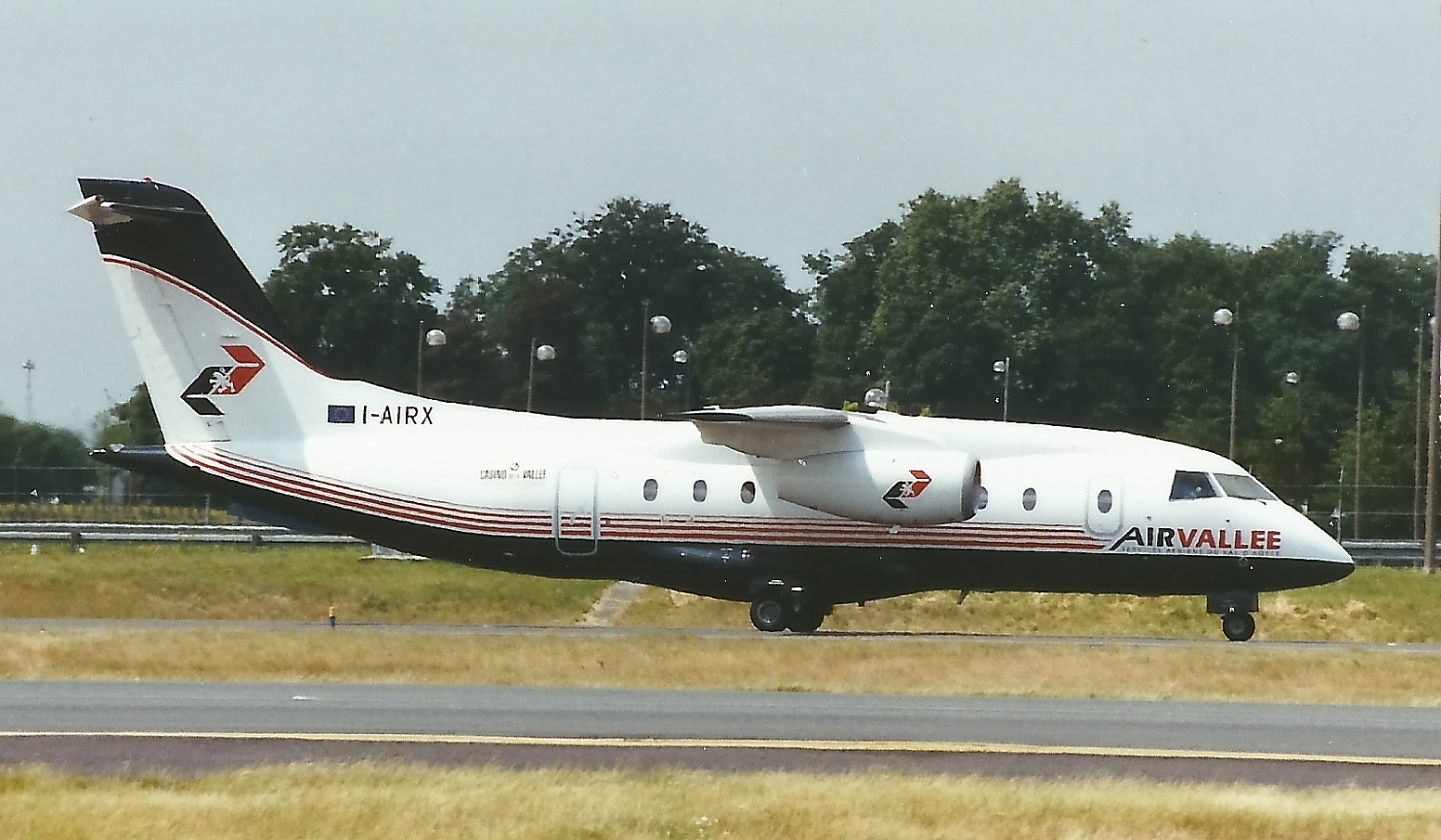
- Dornier 328JET
IATA	ICAO	Call sign
VK	RVL	AIR VALLEE
- Founded: June 1987
- Ceased operations: June 2016
- Operating bases: Federico Fellini International Airport
- Fleet size: 0
- Headquarters: Rimini, Italy
- Website: airvallee.it

Air Vallée S.p.A. began as a regional airline in the north-west of Italy and ended with charter operations in Rimini, on the coast of the Adriatic Sea. In June 2016 it ceased all operations after spending five years in rather erratic activities.

== History ==
Air Vallée was founded in June 1987 to promote the commercial development of Aosta Saint-Christophe airport. In June 1988, a twice weekly air link with Rome was started with a Beechcraft King Air C90. In October of the following year this aircraft was replaced by a Cessna Citation I and another twin jet was bought. Both were replaced by a Learjet 31 acquired in January 1992 and a Beechcraft King Air 200 was acquired in August 1993. All these operations were still categorized as charter flights.

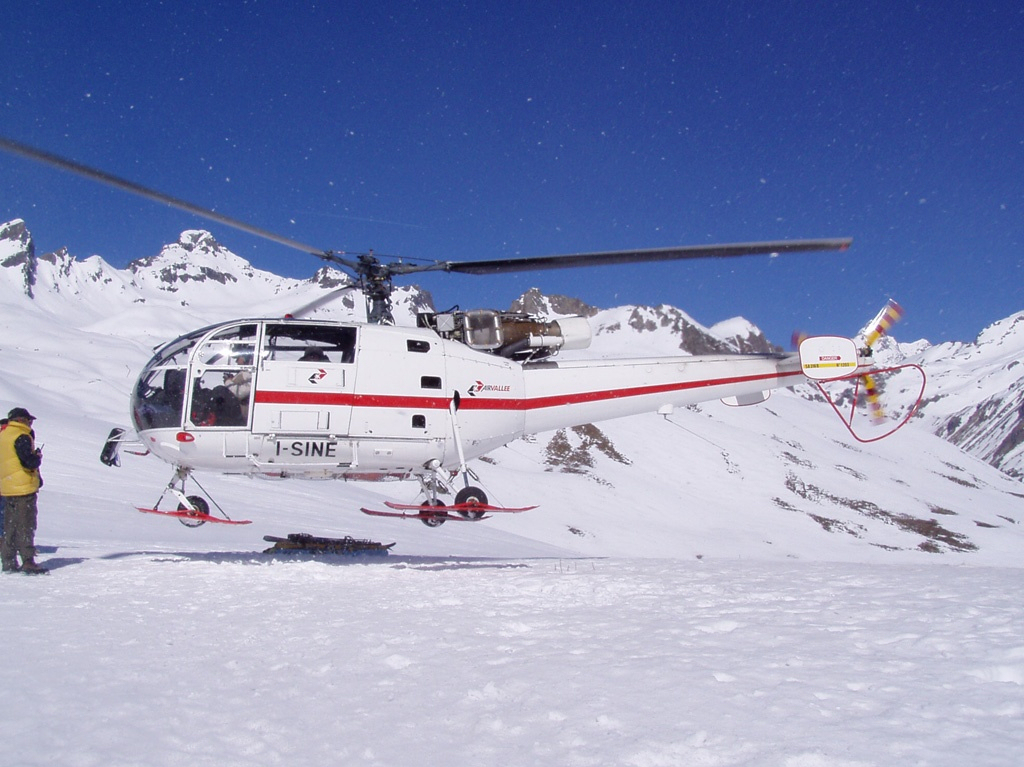
SE-3160 Alouette III Helicopter operations were a side business.

On May 2, 2000, scheduled flights to Turin Caselle Airport and Rome Leonardo da Vinci Airport began, using a Dornier 328JET regional jetliner. Later on it also operated scheduled services linking two destinations in Sardinia and six on mainland Italy, as well as charter services.

In 2009, due to financial and operational problems, Air Vallée was stripped of its air operator's certificate (AOC) by ENAC (civil aviation authority). On 15 January of the following year, after examining the restructuration plan, ENAC issued a new provisional licence. On 25 June, Air Vallée's operational base was moved to Rimini, and it resumed operations with the opening of a route to Naples. Over the course of the summer, the air carrier started flights from Perugia to Olbia (Sardinia). The Dornier 328JET flew all these routes. At the end of the year, the airline resumed service from Aosta, but with just one route to Angers, in France. However, starting with the 2011 summer schedule, the airline definitely left the airport due to passenger shortages.

At the end of 2011, Air Vallée moved its headquarters again from Rimini airport to Parma airport, while between January and September 2012 it operated a route to Catania, in Sicily. Following various cancellations and delays in flight operations, ENAC called a meeting with the company's top management (which had found itself with no aircraft at hand), in which it urged to clearly and publicly define the flight operations pattern. On 24 April 2013, ENAC suspended the company's AOC and on 8 January 2014 all employees were made redundant. In May, Air Vallée resumed operations, while on July 15, ENAC reactivated the operating license. As of September 2014, the airline only operated charter flights.

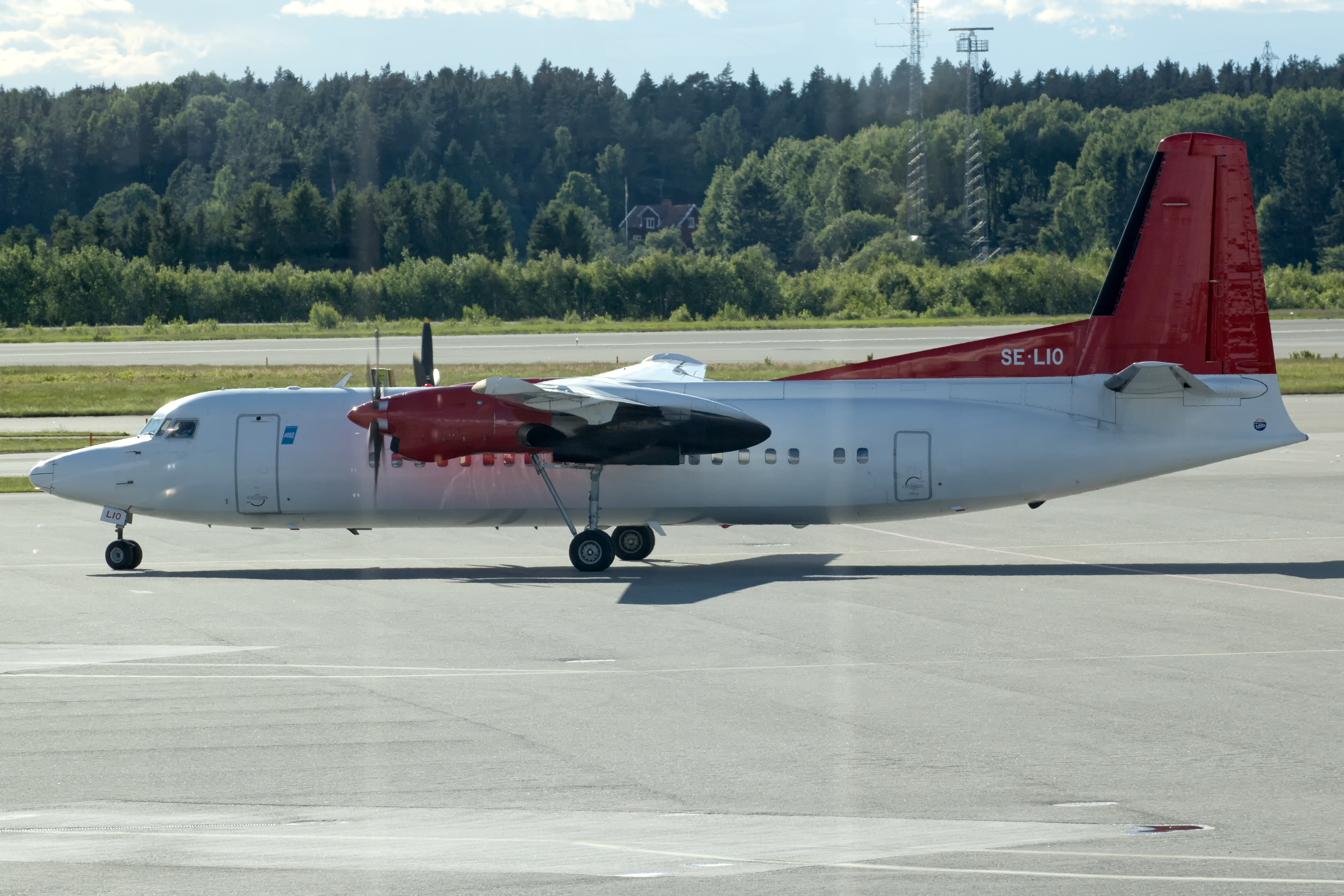
The Fokker 50 leased for the last months of operating life.

In 2015, the airline resumed operations with regular flights from Rimini, Pescara, Bari, Brindisi, Catania, and Tirana. On 30 April 2016, the only aircraft in the fleet, a leased Fokker F50, made an emergency landing at Catania airport due to the failure of the front landing gear to extend. According to an interim report, the cause was attributable to an incorrect maintenance procedure.

Starting from the aeraly smummer, two new routes were planned, but on 1st June the air carrier announced the suspension of flights until 30 November due to "technical difficulties". At the same time, ENAC suspended the AOC again. In the following December ENAC cancelled Air Vallée from the list of Italian companies holding an air transport licence. In November 2017, the company announced a resumption of flights. However on 11 September 2018, Air Vallée was declared bankrupt by the Rimini court.

== Destinations ==
As of October 2015, Air Vallée served the following destinations:

Albania

- Tirana - Tirana International Airport Nënë Tereza

Greece

- Corfu - Corfu International Airport seasonal charter

Italy

- Bari - Bari Karol Wojtyła Airport charter
- Brindisi - Brindisi – Salento Airport focus city
- Catania - Catania-Fontanarossa Airport
- Pescara - Abruzzo Airport charter
- Rimini - Federico Fellini International Airport

== Fleet ==
As of January 2016, the Air Vallée fleet consisted of the following aircraft:

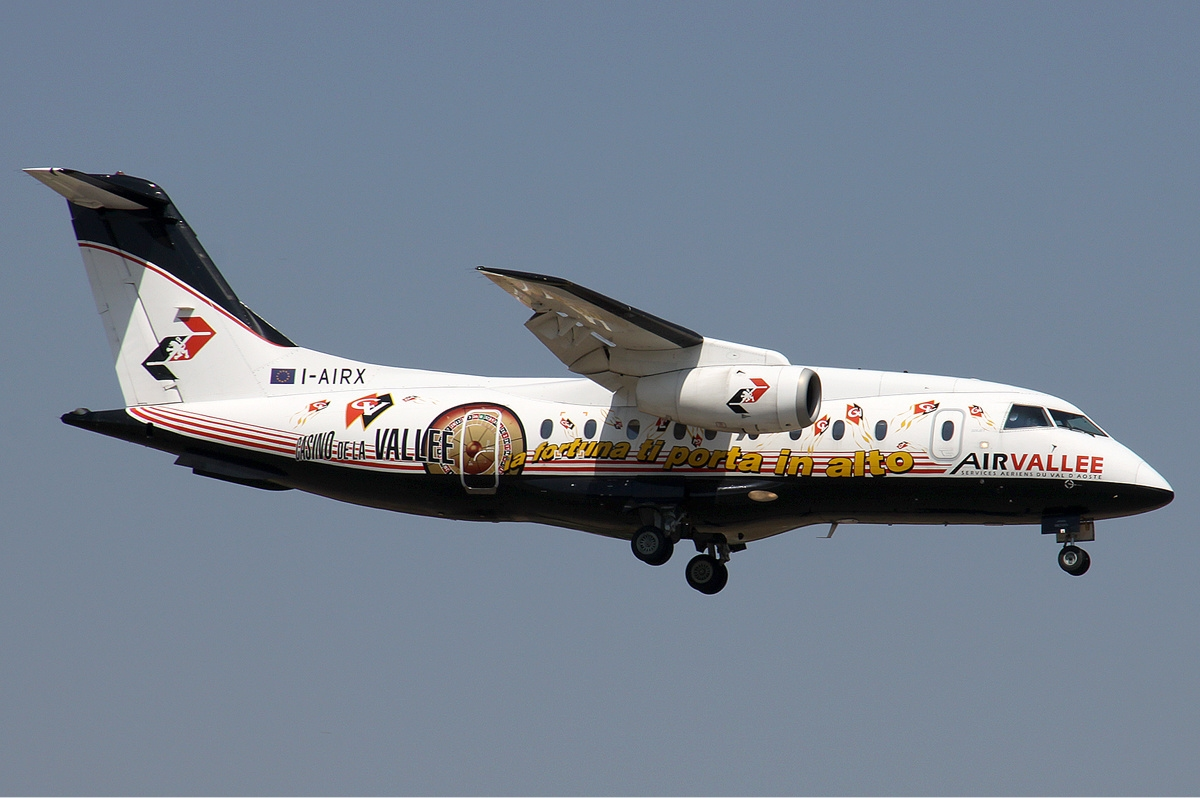
A Fairchild Dornier 328JET

Air Vallée historical fleet
Aircraft	Total	Introduced	Retired	Remark
Airbus A320	2	2008	2009	LZ-BHC leased from BH Air; PH-AAX leased from Amsterdam Airlines
Dornier 328JET	2	2000	2014	I-AIRJ leased from MHS Aviation; I-AIRX leased from Dornier
Fokker 50	1	2014	2016	SE-LEZ operated by Amapola Flyg
Learjet 31	1	1991	2016	I-AIRW
McDonnell Douglas MD-83	1	2011	2012	YR-HBE operated by Medallion Air

== See also ==
- List of defunct airlines of Italy
