= Fly Wex =

IATA	ICAO	Call sign
6P	IAD	FLYWEX
- Founded: 2001 as SixCargo
- Ceased operations: 2007
- Hubs: Brescia Airport
- Secondary hubs: Venice
- Alliance: Club Air
- Fleet size: 1
- Headquarters: Brescia, Italy
- Key people: Alberto Leali, Chief Executive

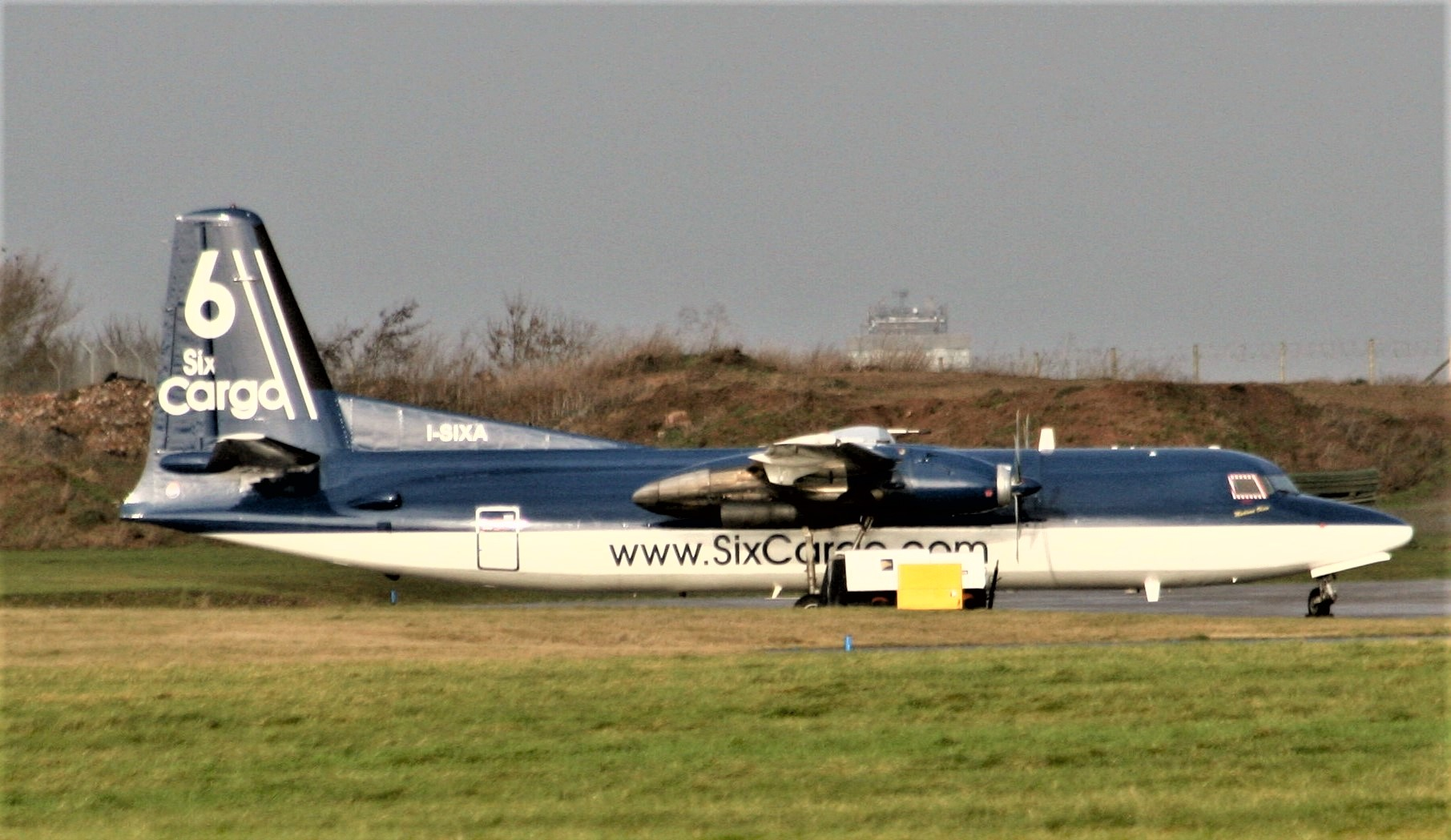
Six Cargo Fokker F27-500RF

Fly Wex was a cargo airline based in Montichiari-Brescia Airport, Italy. It was established as SixCargo in April 2000 by the Leali family, steel industrialists and original founders of Air Dolomiti regional airline. Flight operations were launched on 27 July 2001, mainly domestic cargo services and international services in Europe. On 30 August 2004 it assumed a new corporate name. Operations, which did not have the hoped-for success, were halted in 2007.

== Fleet ==
Fly Wex operated the following aircraft (at March 2007):

- 1 Fokker F27-500RF

== See also ==
- List of defunct airlines of Italy
