= Airumbria =

| IATA | ICAO | Call sign |
|---|---|---|
| — | UMB | AIR UMBRIA |
- Founded: 1992
- Ceased operations: 2014
- Operating bases: Perugia San Francesco d'Assisi – Umbria International Airport
- Headquarters: Umbria, Italy
- Website: www.airumbria.aero

Airumbria S.r.l. was an Italian airline. It was founded in 1992 and operated business air taxi services. In 2014 or 2015, a new company, Prime Service Italia S.r.l., was launched as its successor.

== See also ==
- List of defunct airlines of Italy
