= Air Sicilia =

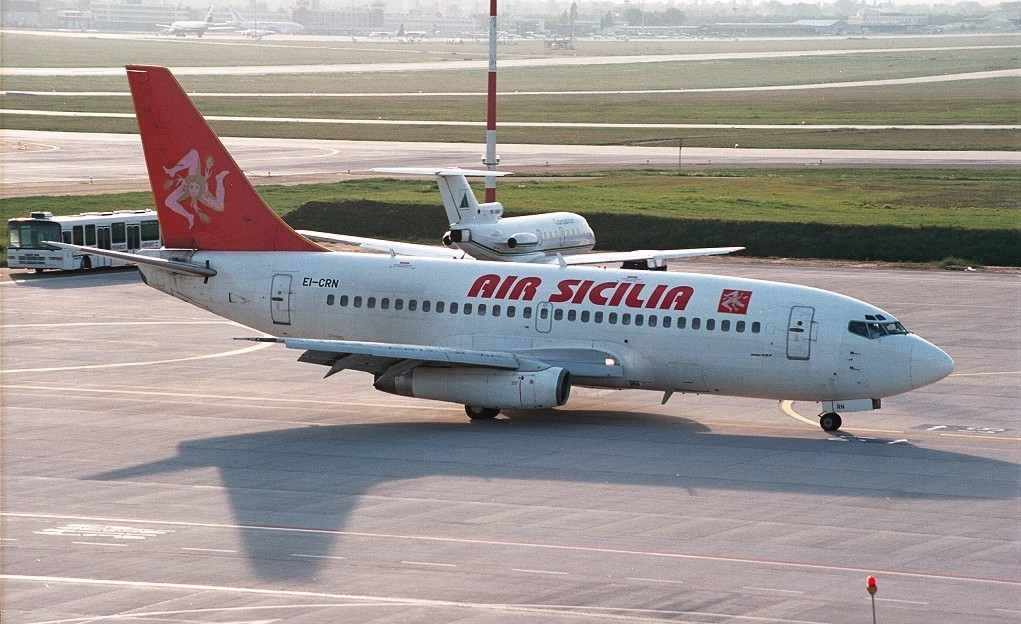
IATA	ICAO	Call sign
BM	SIC	AIR SICILY
- Founded: 1991
- Commenced operations: 1994
- Ceased operations: 2002
- Fleet size: 9 (total)
- Destinations: 7
- Founder: Luigi Crispino

Air Sicilia was an Italian airline founded in 1991 and remained in business until 2002; it was declared bankrupt in January 2003.

== History ==
Air Sicilia was founded in 1991 by Luigi Crispino in Caltagirone to attempt to break Alitalia's domestic market monopoly and commenced operations in 1994 from Milan and Rome to the small island of Lampedusa, located in the middle of the Mediterranean Sea. The first aircraft in the fleet was an overhauled ATR 42 used from 1994 on flights from Palermo to Rome. Air Sicilia later gained the monthly flight record with turboprop aircraft, a total of 398 hours. Later a second ATR 42 named Peter Pan. Between 1994 and 2001 Air Sicilia had its AOC suspended twice. On June 6, 1996, A leased Fokker F28 named Mary Poppins was added to the fleet in 1996. The real turning point in quality came in 1998, with the arrival of the first of three Boeing 737-200 which allowed the airline to record traffic of over 200,000 passengers. At that time, Air Sicilia served all five Sicilian airports suitable for regular traffic: Catania, Lampedusa, Palermo, Pantelleria, and Trapani. After the cessation of operations Luigi Crispino was trialed for bankruptcy fraud but never was charged after the evidence against him was weak.

== Fleet ==
Aircraft type	In fleet	In service	Retired	Remarks
ATR 42	4	1994	2003	2 leased
Boeing 737-200	3	1998	2001	2 more leased in 2001
Fokker F28	2	1996	1998	both leased
McDonnell Douglas MD-87	1	2001	2001	leased

== Destinations ==
- Palermo
- Rome
- Milan
- Pantelleria
- Lampedusa
- Bergamo
- Florence

== See also ==
List of defunct airlines of Italy
