= Ocean Airlines =

Cargo airline based in Brescia, Italy

| IATA | ICAO | Call sign |
|---|---|---|
| VC | VCX | OCEANCARGO |
- Founded: 2003
- Ceased operations: 2008
- Hubs: Brescia Airport
- Fleet size: 4
- Destinations: HKG, PVG, ALA, VBS
- Headquarters: Brescia, Italy
- Website: http://www.oceanairlines.com/ (Apparently website not working anymore)

Ocean Airlines S.p.A. was a cargo airline based in Brescia, Italy. It operated cargo services to Asia. Its main base was Brescia Airport.

== History ==
The airline was established in September 2003 and started operations in November 2004. It was owned by Finrep (40%), Ined Holdings (40%), and ITAL Aviation (20%). It had 100 employees as of March 2007.

It stopped flying in late October 2007 and was grounded in January 2008 by the Italian Civil Aviation Authority. The airline was declared bankrupt and receivers called in late April 2008.

== Former destinations ==
Ocean Airlines served the following at closure in 2007:

Angola

- Luanda - Quatro de Fevereiro Airport

China

- Shanghai - Pudong International Airport

Hong Kong

- Hong Kong International Airport

Italy

- Brescia - Brescia Airport Hub

Japan

- Nagoya - Chubu Centrair International Airport

Kazakhstan

- Almaty - Almaty International Airport

Kyrgyzstan

- Bishkek - Manas International Airport

Pakistan

- Lahore - Allama Iqbal International Airport

Turkey

- Istanbul - Atatürk International Airport

United Arab Emirates

- Abu Dhabi - Abu Dhabi International Airport

== Fleet ==
The Ocean Airlines fleet consisted of the following aircraft (as of November 2007):

Ocean Airlines Historical Fleet
| Aircraft | Image | Total | Introduced | Retired | Remark |
|---|---|---|---|---|---|
| Boeing 747-200F | | 4 | 2004 | 2007 | I-OCEA, I-OCEU; F-GCBF, F-GCBH |
