= Aeral =

Cargo airline (Defunct)

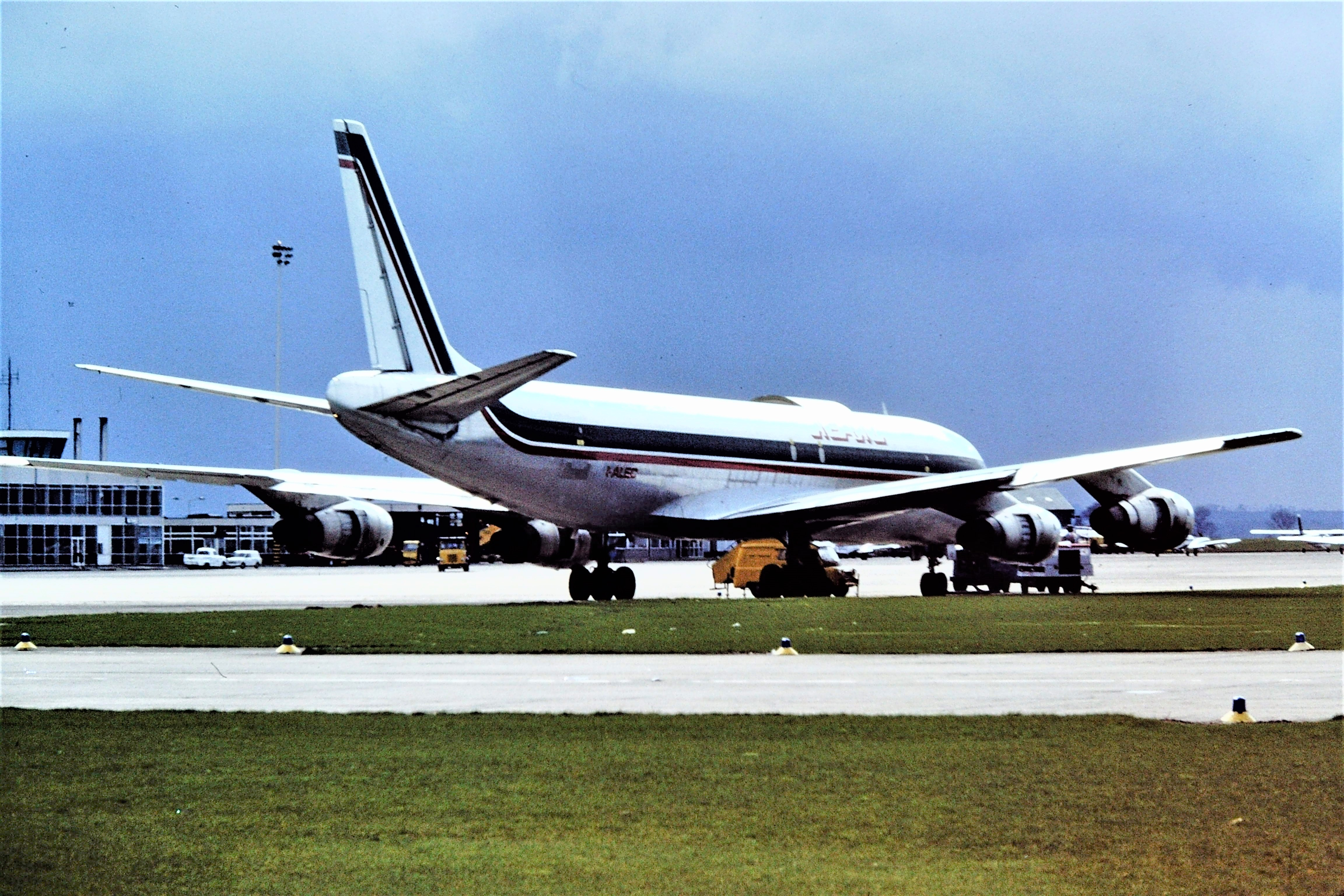
- Douglas DC-8-50
IATA	ICAO	Call sign
HS	-	Skytruck
- Founded: 1958
- Ceased operations: 1980
- Focus cities: Milan Malpensa, Rome Fiumicino
- Fleet size: 5
- Headquarters: Roma via Cardinal Ginnasi, 12

Aeral is a defunct private Italian airline, which used ex-Alitalia Douglas DC-8s.

== History ==
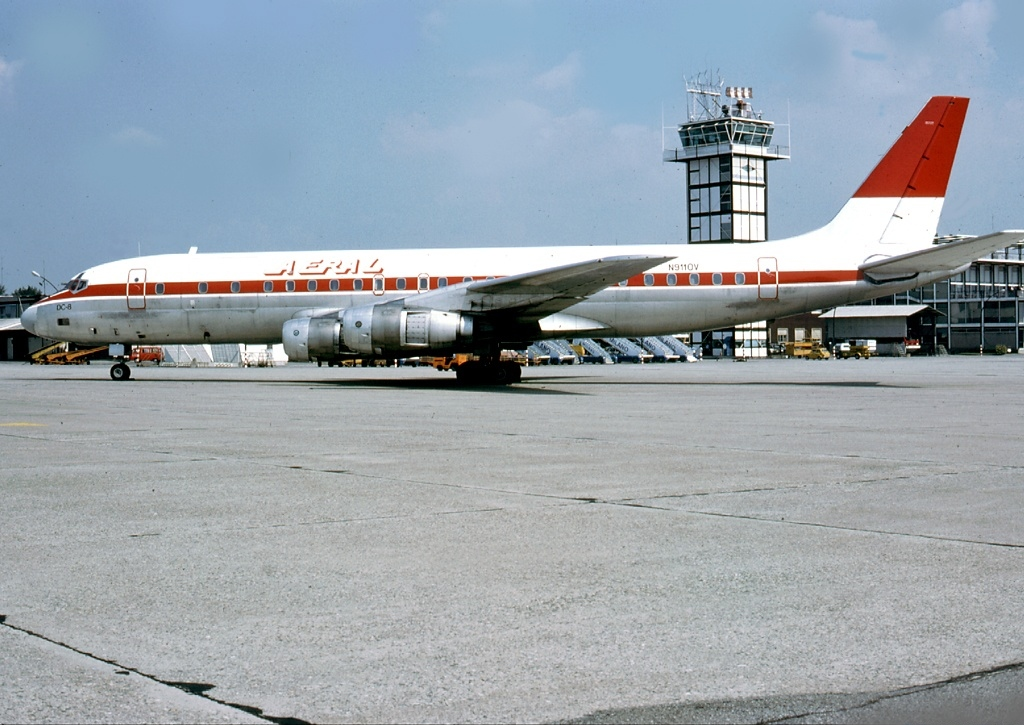
Douglas DC-855CF still in pre-delivery colors

It was founded in March 1958 at Alessandria in southern Piedmont region with the registered name of Aerotrasporti Alessandria. Original shareholders included Aeronautica Macchi (50%). Shortly after, panoramic flights and some air taxis began with light Aermacchi AL.60 aircraft and then Cessna 421. In that same year it changed its corporate name to AerAl (contraction of AERonautica ALessandrina). A de Havilland DH.104 was also part of the initial fleet. In 1977 the company was purchased by Mrs. Maria Luisa Bottanelli and her life partner Jean Michel Baroche who were convinced by a group of aviation enthusiasts from Turin to change strategy.

In 1978, marking the twentieth anniversary of its founding, the company completely changed its operations. It relocated the operational base to Milan Malpensa airport and purchased its first Douglas DC 8 series 54 (ex-Alitalia) already converted into an all-cargo version, and began scheduled cargo flights as a full-fledged airline on February 17, 1979. The fleet continued to maintain an AL.60 and the Cessna 421. A second DC 8 leased from Overseas National Airways was introduced in December 1979 for passenger operations as well. An unusual collaboration was established with Alitalia because two pilots of the flag airline were seconded to facilitate the use of the Douglas four-jet aircraft that flew mostly for Alitalia itself.

Despite the expansion into long-haul air services, Aeral faced financial difficulties. The move of the management to Ostia (Rome province) was of no help, while the operational bases remained at the airports of Milan-Malpensa and Turin-Caselle. The economic challenges ultimately compelled the carrier to discontinue all flight operations, even the charter ones, a cessation which became final on 31 August 1980. The company was declared bankrupt the following year.

== See also ==
- List of defunct airlines of Italy
