= Evolavia =

Italian airline

IATA	ICAO	Call sign
7B	—	—
- Hubs: Ancona
- Headquarters: Italy

Evolavia (styled as eVOLAvia) was a low-cost airline based in Ancona, Italy. Its name in Italian (e vola via) means and fly away. It operated out of Ancona Airport since the middle of 2002 sub-contracting all flights other airlines. Operations were halted in 2007.

== Destinations ==
Evolavia operated low cost flights from Ancona Airport to Paris (Charles de Gaulle Airport), Barcelona, and Palermo.

== Fleet ==
Barcelona services were operated by Spanair with MD-83 and Paris ones by Europe Airpost with Boeing 737-300.

== See also ==
- List of defunct airlines of Italy
