= EGO Airways =

Italian airline

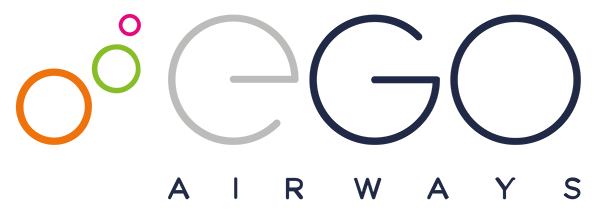
IATA	ICAO	Call sign
E3	EGW	EGOL
- Founded: June 29, 2019
- Commenced operations: March 28, 2021
- Ceased operations: 4 January 2022
- Focus cities: Parma Airport
- Fleet size: 1
- Headquarters: Milan, Lombardy
- Key people: Matteo Bonecchi (CEO); Marco Busca (Accountable Manager)
- Employees: 50
- Website: egoairways.com

EGO Airways S.p.A. was a privately owned Italian airline start-up headquartered in Milan, Lombardy. The airline operated from its base at Parma Airport. EGO Airways suspended all activities after the lessor of their fleet decide to terminate the contract with the company after contractual disputes. In late 2022, the liquidation of the airline was announced.

== History ==
EGO currently planned to fly to domestic destinations with a base at Milan Malpensa Airport. On 19 November 2020, EGO received the air operator's certificate (AOC) by the Italian CAA (ENAC) and operated its first commercial flight on 2 December 2020, with a charter flight from Naples to Amsterdam. After obtaining the AOC, schedule operations were due to start in the summer season 2021.

Since December 2020, the airline had been focused on charter flights. It signed a contract with SSC Napoli football club in order to transport the team in away matches with the aircraft being based at Naples International Airport.

In December 2021 the company had to return its fleet to German Airways due to conflicts between the two companies about the leasing contract, this resulted in a suspension of all flights operated by EGO Airways due to a lack of aircraft. Shortly after, EGO Airways’ operating permit was suspended by the ENAC on 4 January 2022. In December 2022, it has been announced that the airline will be liquidated.

== Destinations ==
EGO Airways planned on flying to 11 destinations when they were supposed to launch scheduled services in early 2021. However, this did not materialize.

== Fleet ==
As of 30 December 2021, prior to the suspension of operations, EGO Airways' fleet included the following aircraft:

Aircraft	Active	Orders	Passengers	Notes
Embraer 190	1	1	100	Leased from and returned to German Airways.
Total	1	1	—	
