= Amsterdam Airlines =

Dutch charter airline

Amsterdam Air
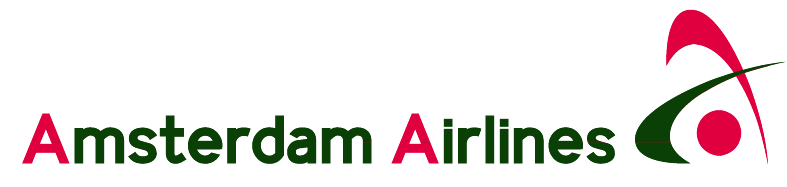
IATA	ICAO	Call sign
WD	AAN	AMSTEL
- Founded: 2007
- Ceased operations: 31 October 2011
- Hubs: Amsterdam Schiphol Airport Maastricht Aachen Airport
- Fleet size: 3
- Destinations: Charter operations
- Headquarters: Amsterdam Airport Schiphol; Haarlemmermeer, Netherlands
- Key people: Ayhan Kara (CEO), Jaap Horsten (managing director)
- Website: http://www.amsterdam-airlines.com/

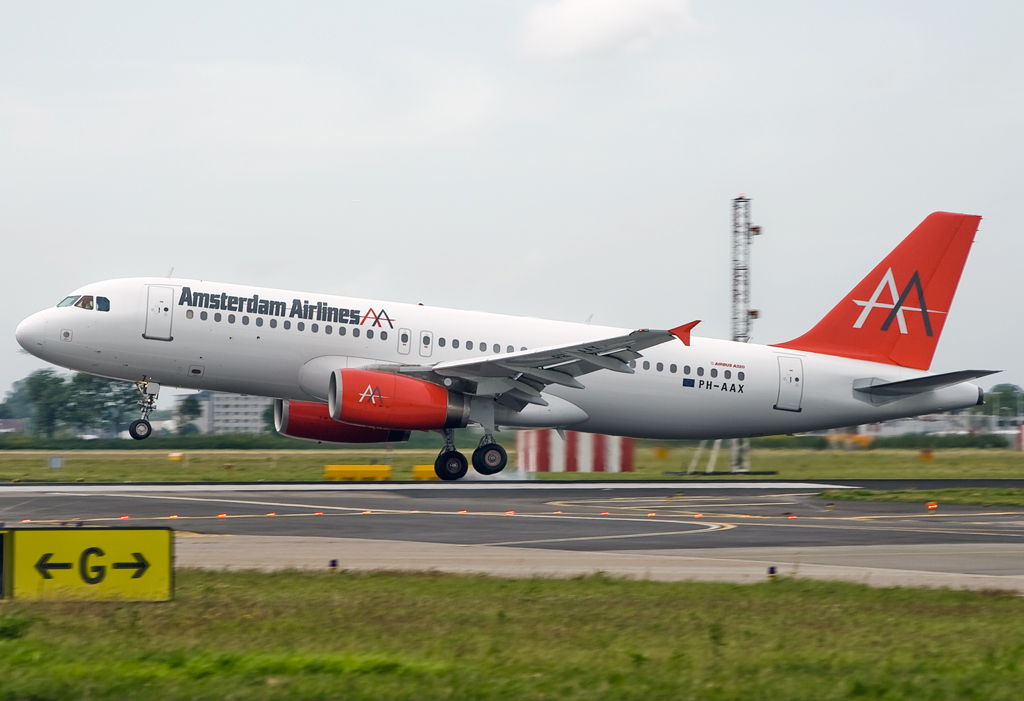
Amsterdam Airlines' first A320 touching down in Amsterdam after its ferry flight

Amsterdam Airlines was a Dutch charter airline with its head office in Schiphol-Rijk on the grounds of Amsterdam Airport Schiphol in Haarlemmermeer, Netherlands. Founded in 2007, Amsterdam Airlines used to provide both charter and wet lease services. It ceased its operation on 31 October 2011 and went bankrupt on 22 November that year.

== Fleet ==
At the time of closure, Amsterdam Airlines' fleet consisted of three aircraft:

Amsterdam Airlines fleet
Aircraft	On order	Total	Passengers
Airbus A320-231	0	3	180

Amsterdam Airlines' first aircraft, an Airbus A320, arrived at Schiphol on 18 June 2008 from Mexico City via Gander, Canada. The aircraft (MSN 430) was on lease from ILFC, and is registered PH-AAX. Their second aircraft, registration PH-AAY (MSN 527), entered service mid-2009 and a third aircraft, registration PH-AAZ (MSN 299) was delivered on 18 April 2011. Two aircraft have been returned to their lessors. The flights are taken over by ML Tours Strategic Airlines but at the moment Corendon Nederland Airlines NLD operates these flights.
