= Unifly Express =

Italian airline

Unifly and Unifly Express
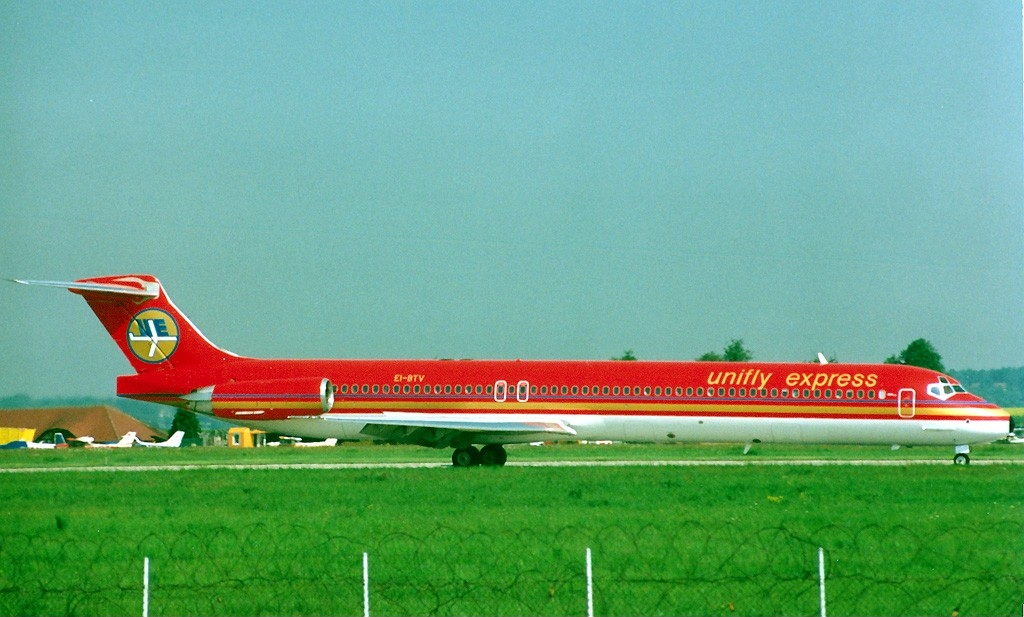
- McDonnell Douglas MD-83
IATA	ICAO	Call sign
IP	UNU	Unifly
- Founded: 1976 as Unifly; 1987 as Unifly Express
- Commenced operations: 1980 as Unifly; 1988 as Unifly Express
- Ceased operations: 1987 as Unifly; 1990 as Unifly Express
- Operating bases: various
- Hubs: various
- Secondary hubs: various
- Focus cities: Rome
- Frequent-flyer program: n.a.
- Subsidiaries: Alinord
- Destinations: several
- Key people: Ennio Pompei Unifly Express President

The name Unifly is common to two airlines, related to each other, but with completely different activities, locations and times.

== Unifly s.r.l. ==
Unifly srl was founded in 1976 to provide air taxis, private flights, and a pilot training school. Until 1984, it was controlled by the Previdenza Group, but the real driving force was pilot Giulio La Starza. The company was headquartered at Rome-Urbe Airport, which was also the first operational base. The fleet included Cessna Citation I twin-engine executive aircraft seating 6-8 people, with the option of on-board bar service or meals. Later, a Dassault Falcon 20, a twin-engine Piper "Cheyenne," and an Aérospatiale "Gazelle" helicopter were added.

The operating base was later moved to Rome-Ciampino airport, and representative offices were opened in Milan, Naples, and Bari. Four Fokker F28s, seating 65 in a single-class, originally owned by Itavia, were acquired. These aircraft were supported by a technical facility located inside a hangar (also formerly owned by Itavia). Unifly became a fully-fledged airline on April 1, 1984, with the commencement of charter operations. Regular destinations were reached in Europe (Greece in particular) and the Mediterranean (Tunisia, Morocco). One of these first flights was from Florence, in September 1985, to transport fans following the city's football team. Management announced its intention to launch scheduled flights in 1987, and for this purpose, three ATR 42s were ordered (which were later canceled). In 1985 it signed an agreement with Alitalia and operated flights on its behalf.

Overall, the plans proved ambitious, and operations languished until the company entered receivership in November 1985. Two years later, operations ceased completely. It was placed into liquidation with approximately 8 billion lire in debt.

=== Unifly fleet ===
Aircraft	Total	Introduced	Retired	Registration
Fokker F28-1000	4	1984	1987	I-TIDI, I-TIBB, I-TIDB, I-TIAP

== Unifly Express ==
Unifly Express was created in January 1987 by transforming the inactive Antares Airlines - controlled by SEMA Eurofinance - into a new airline, also acquiring some assets of Unifly srl. The financier was Aurelio Paolinelli, who had made a considerable fortune through television sales. Ennio Pompei, a Christian Democrat politician and former Alitalia executive, was appointed president. The initial projects were charter flights and fast freight transport, the latter through contracts with DHL and Federal Express for groupage cargo regular flights from Rome to Bergamo and onward to Brussels. Initially, two Dassault Falcon 20s and a Cessna Citation I were used, all adapted for parcel transport. Subsequently, two McDonnell Douglas DC-9-15RCs were acquired, both in all-freight versions.

For passenger charter flights, the Boeing 737 was rejected and three McDonnell Douglas MD-83s were chosen, each with 165 seats in a single-class accommodation and capable to operate medium-haul flights with full payload. overall a total of five MD-82s and one MD-83 were operated. These operations began on May 7, 1988, with a flight from Naples to Düsseldorf. By that time, 6,000 flight hours had already been sold to various tour operators. The most frequently reached destinations were the Canary Islands and then also Africa (Senegal, Kenya, Maldives). The project of Linee Aeree Siciliane affiliate, established on October 7, 1987, specifically to operate charter flights to and from Sicily, did not take off.

Scheduled flights began in January 1990, but were discontinued in May. This was due to the bankruptcy of SEMA Eurofinance. The acquisition of Alinord in 1990 also did not help, as it suffered the same fate as its parent company, which ceased operations a few months later. The MD-80s were returned to the lessors and part of the fleet was subsequently acquired by Noman (led by the aforementioned pilot Giulio La Starza).

== Fleet details ==
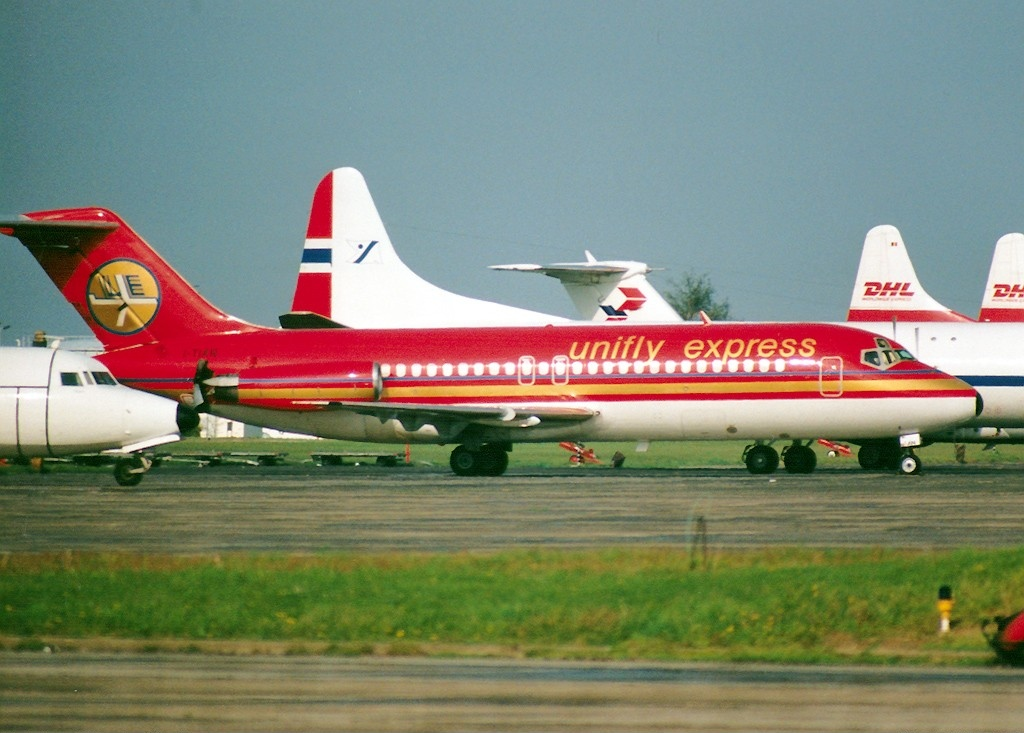
Douglas DC-9-15RC

Unifly Express fleet
Aircraft	Total	Introduced	Retired	Registration
Fokker F28-1000	4	1987	1990	I-TIDI, I-TIBB, I-TIDB, I-TIAP
McDonnell Douglas DC-9-15RC	2	1988	1991	I-TIAN, I-TIAR
McDonnell Douglas MD-82	3	1989	1991	EI-BTX, EI-BTY, N6202S
McDonnell Douglas MD-83	3	1988	1990	EI-BTU, EI-BTV, N6202D

== See also ==
- List of defunct airlines of Italy
