= Sagittair =

Italian charter airline

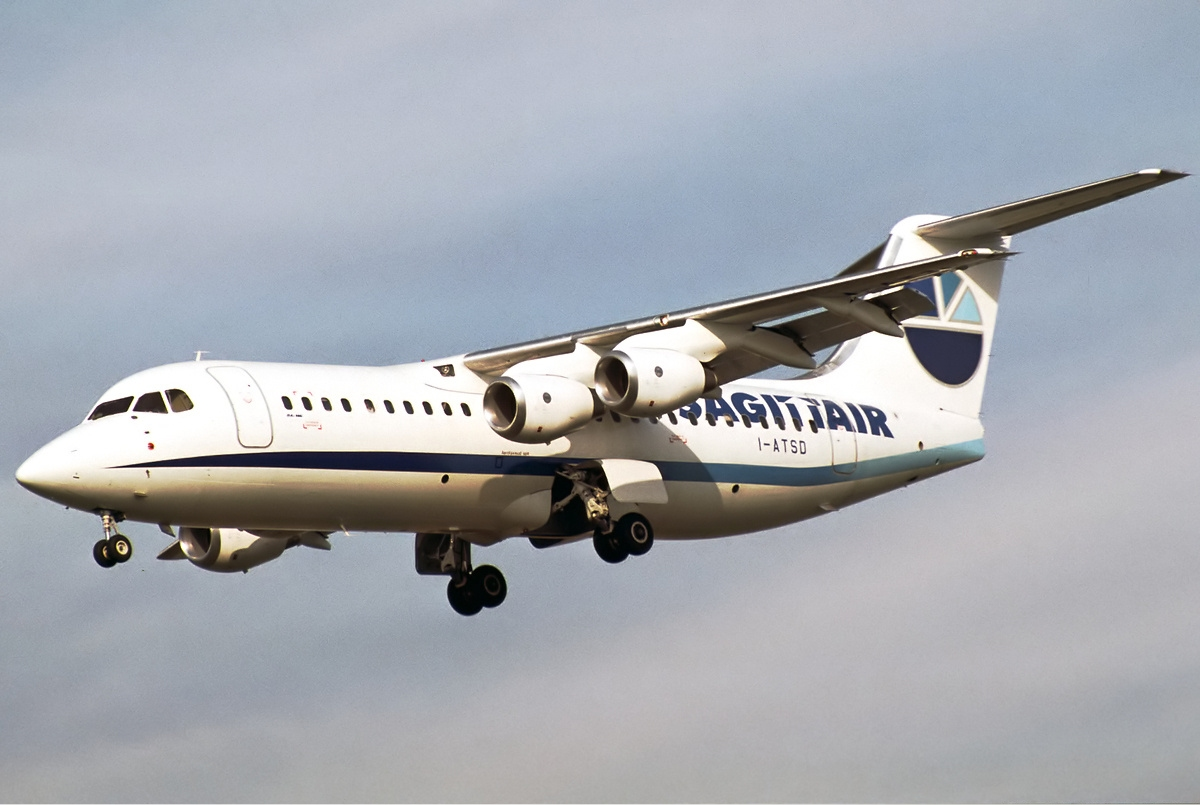
- BAe 146-300
IATA	ICAO	Call sign
SG	SGT	—
- Founded: 1990
- Commenced operations: August 1990
- Ceased operations: September 1991
- Hubs: Rome
- Fleet size: 2
- Parent company: So.Co.F.Imm Partecipazioni
- Headquarters: Naples
- Key people: Enrico Villani CEO

Sagittair was a charter airline base in Italy that operated for a short time, between 1990 and 1991.

== History ==
Aerotaxi Sud SpA was founded in Naples in 1986 but began operations only three years later with Cessna Citation twin-jet business aircraft. In early 1990, it changed its name to Sagittair. The investment at the time was 155 billion Liras, provided by So.Co.F.Imm Partecipazioni, a leasing and financial services company, which controlled four travel agencies and had stakes in several tourist resorts in Sardinia. Two banks later joined. The aim was to operate charter and IT flights from Milan, Naples, and Rome to destinations throughout the Mediterranean basin (particularly Greece, Spain, and Tunisia), a sector in which estimates confirmed a potential traffic of 4.6 million passengers. It also wanted to maintain its air taxi business. Authorization had also been requested for scheduled flights to begin in 1993.

Operations as a fully-fledged airline began in August with two BAe 146-300s series 300 from Rome Ciampino airport because permission was denied to establish an operational base at Naples' Capodichino airport. Technical problems soon arose regarding the maintenance of the BAe.146s and, especially, the already delivered but not operational McDonnell Douglas MD-83ss, but flight authorizations for these twin-engined jetliners never arrived. The BAe 146s were serviced by Mistral Air (which already flew the type), while no authorization was issued by the RAI (Italian airworthness authority) for the MD.83s. Therefore, the medium-range charter "packages" were partly entrusted to airlines from the then Federal Republic of Yugoslavia (Aviogenex, JAT).

By the summer of 1991, losses of 16 billion Liras had already been recorded, and So.Co.F.Imm sought further financing because the expected total debt was approaching 100 billion. The end was close: operations ceased completely in September, and all the aircraft were returned to their owners in November. The Court of Naples moved swiftly and declared So.Co.F.Imm and all its subsidiaries bankrupt. The company's management was subsequently charged with fraudulent bankruptcy.

== Fleet ==
Sagittair fleet consisted of the following aircraft as of September 1991:

Aircraft	Total	Remarks
BAe 146-300	2	Registered I-ATSC/ATSD
McDonnell Douglas MD-83	2	Registered EI-CBR/CBS
