= Air Service Plus =

Italian low cost airline

IATA	ICAO	Call sign
—	AXY	—
- Commenced operations: 2003
- Ceased operations: 2008
- Operating bases: Abruzzo International Airport
- Focus cities: Charles de Gaulle International Airport; Brussels South Charleroi Airport
- Headquarters: Pescara, Abruzzo, Italy

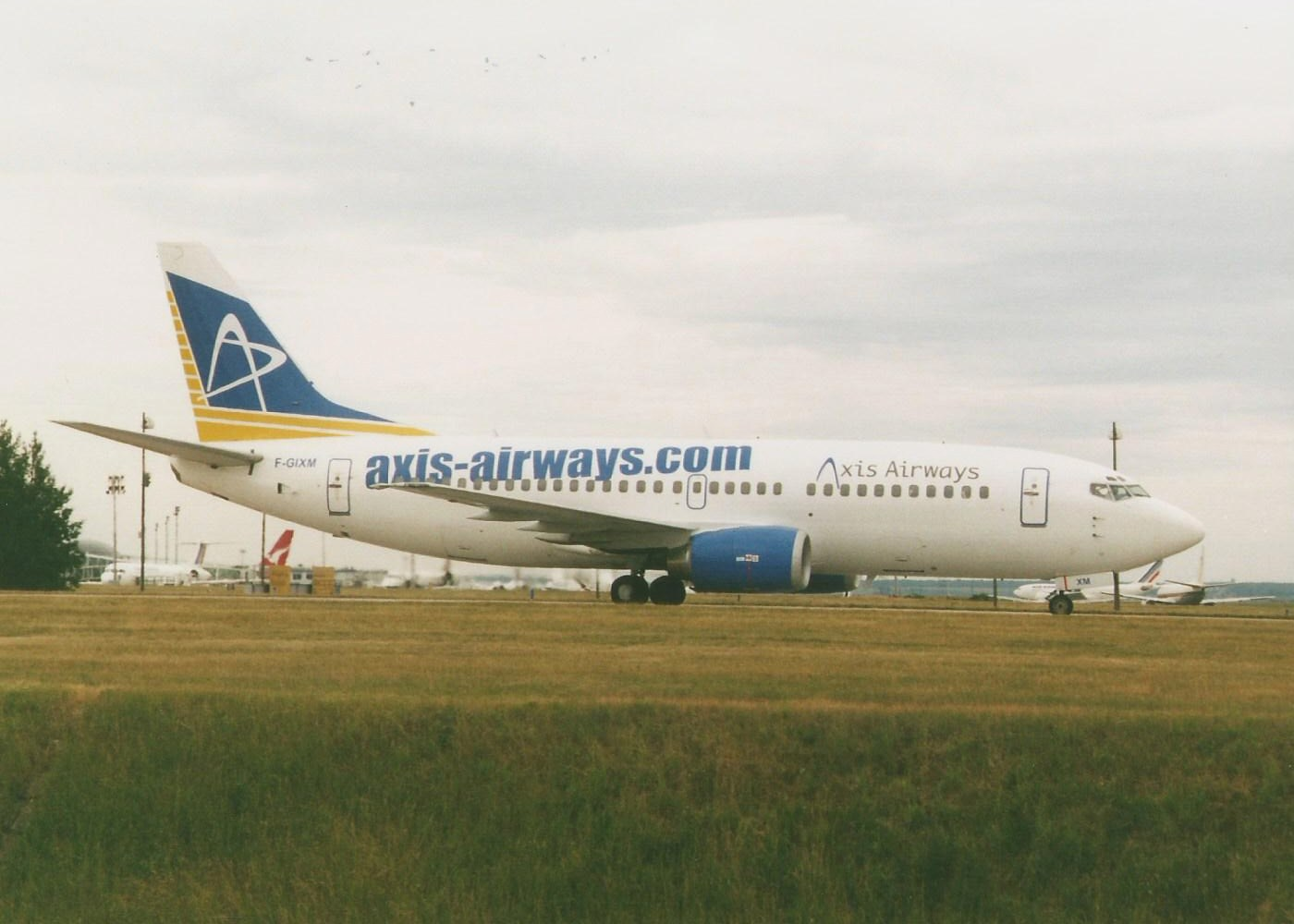
Boeing 737-300

Air Service Plus was a low cost airline based in Pescara, Abruzzo, Italy. It operated services to destinations in Europe. Flights were operated by Axis Airways, a French airline. Its main base was Abruzzo International Airport, Pescara.

== History ==
The airline began operating low-fare flights connecting Pescara to Paris (Charles de Gaulle International Airport) in 2003, then to Brussels (Brussels South Charleroi Airport) in 2004. During 2005, Air Service Plus started new routes from Pescara to Zürich and from Perugia to Paris. As of 2005, the airline had carried more than 65,000 passengers, making Pescara and the Abruzzo Region well known amongst French and Belgian tourists. Operations continued until 2008.

== See also ==
- List of defunct airlines of Italy
