= PRiMA Aero Trasporti Italiani =

Italian airline

IATA	ICAO	Call sign
E3	EGS	EAGLES
- Founded: 2010
- Ceased operations: 2011
- Hubs: Bologna
- Fleet size: 3
- Destinations: 7
- Headquarters: Venice
- Website: http://www.primair.it/

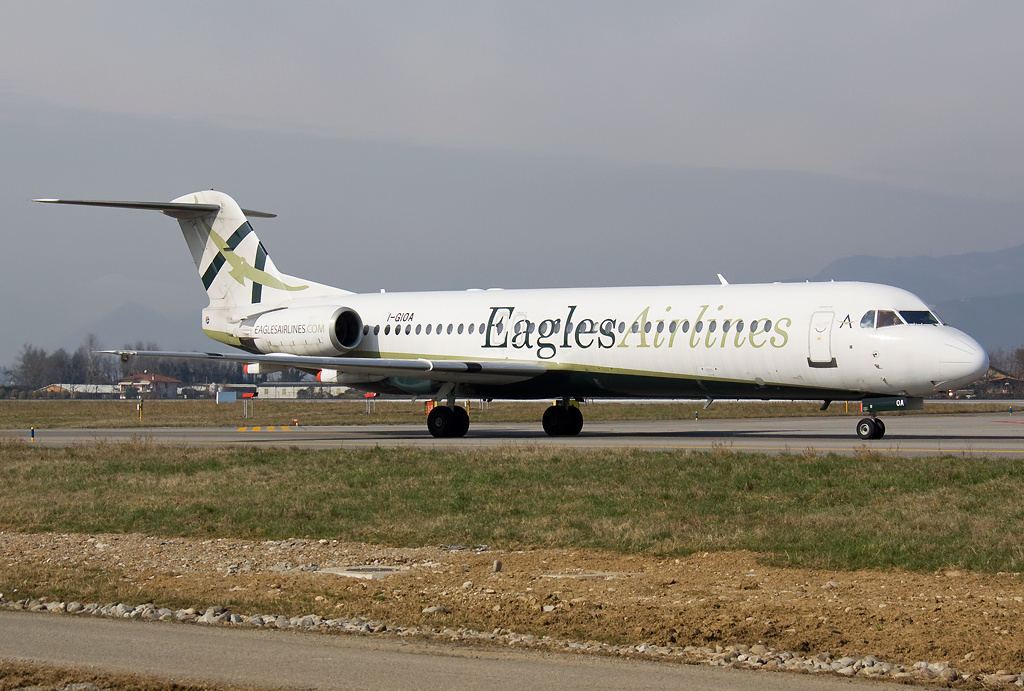
Fokker 100 I-GIDA still in Eagles Airline livery

Eagles Airlines was an Italian airline founded in 2010 and headquartered in Marghera, the Venice industrial suburb, and backed by a Sicilian investment company. The hub was Venice Marco Polo Airport (VCE). The airline made its first flight on 24 August 2010 on the Venice-Lamezia Terme route, and subsequently also launched flights to Catania, Reggio Calabria and Rome Fiumicino. The fleet was made up by a couple of Fokker 100s which sporadically operated short-medium haul charter flights as well.

On 23 May 2011 a lawsuit against the air carrier use of the Eagles name was decided in favour of Alpi Eagles (which had been declared bankrupt two years earlier), as a result of which the airline changed its name to PRiMA Aero Trasporti Italiani effective 27 May. Discouraged by this decision and faced with modest passenger traffic PRiMA halted operations on 4 November 2011.

== Destinations ==
- Italy
  - Bergamo
  - Bologna - Guglielmo Marconi Airport
  - Catania - Fontanarossa Airport
  - Crotone
  - Forlì
  - Lamezia Terme
  - Naples
  - Rome (both Ciampino and Fiumicino airports)
  - Venice

Europe

- France: Nîmes, Paris-Charles de Gaulle
- Germany: Berlin-Tegel
- Greece: Athens
- Macedonia: Skopje
- Romania: Bucharest

== Fleet ==
The PRiMA Aero Trasporti Italiani fleet included the following aircraft:

PRiMA Aero Trasporti Italiani Historical Fleet
Aircraft	Total	Introduced	Retired	Remark
Fokker 100	2	2011	2011	I-GIDA, I-GIDI

== See also ==
- List of defunct airlines of Italy
