= Gandalf Airlines =

Italian airline (1998–2004)

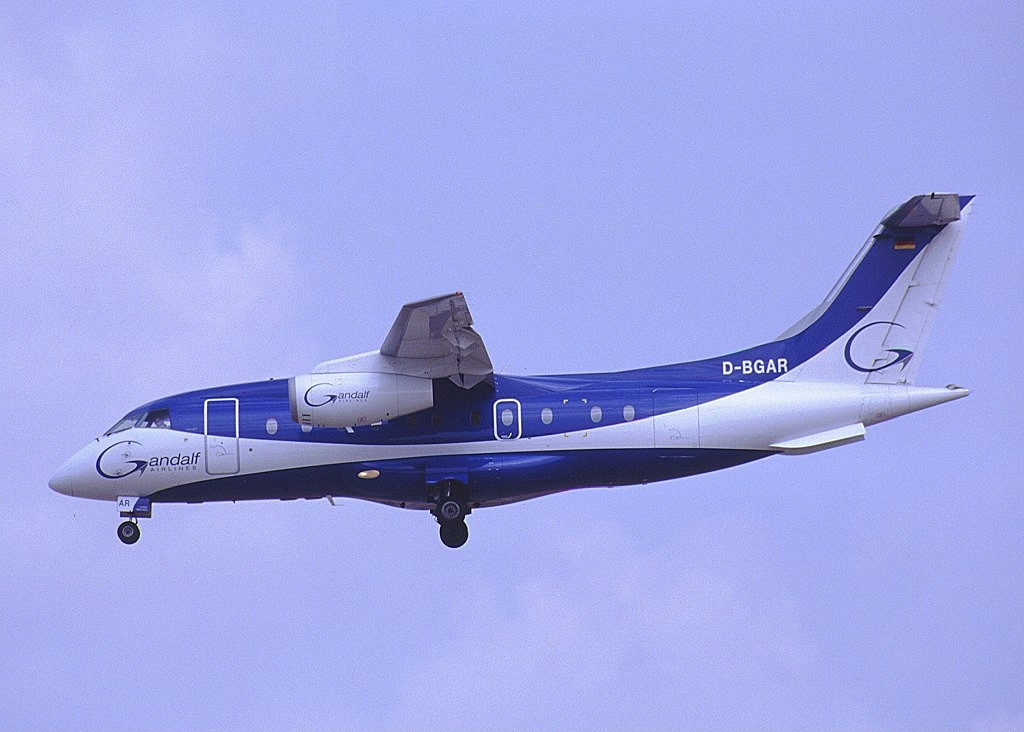
- Dornier 328JET-300
IATA	ICAO	Call sign
G7	GNF	Gandalf
- Founded: 1998
- Ceased operations: 2004
- Hubs: Orio al Serio
- Fleet size: 15
- Headquarters: Italy
- Key people: Luciano Di Fazio Chief Executive Domiziano Boschi Director Luigi Gozzini Marketing & Strategy

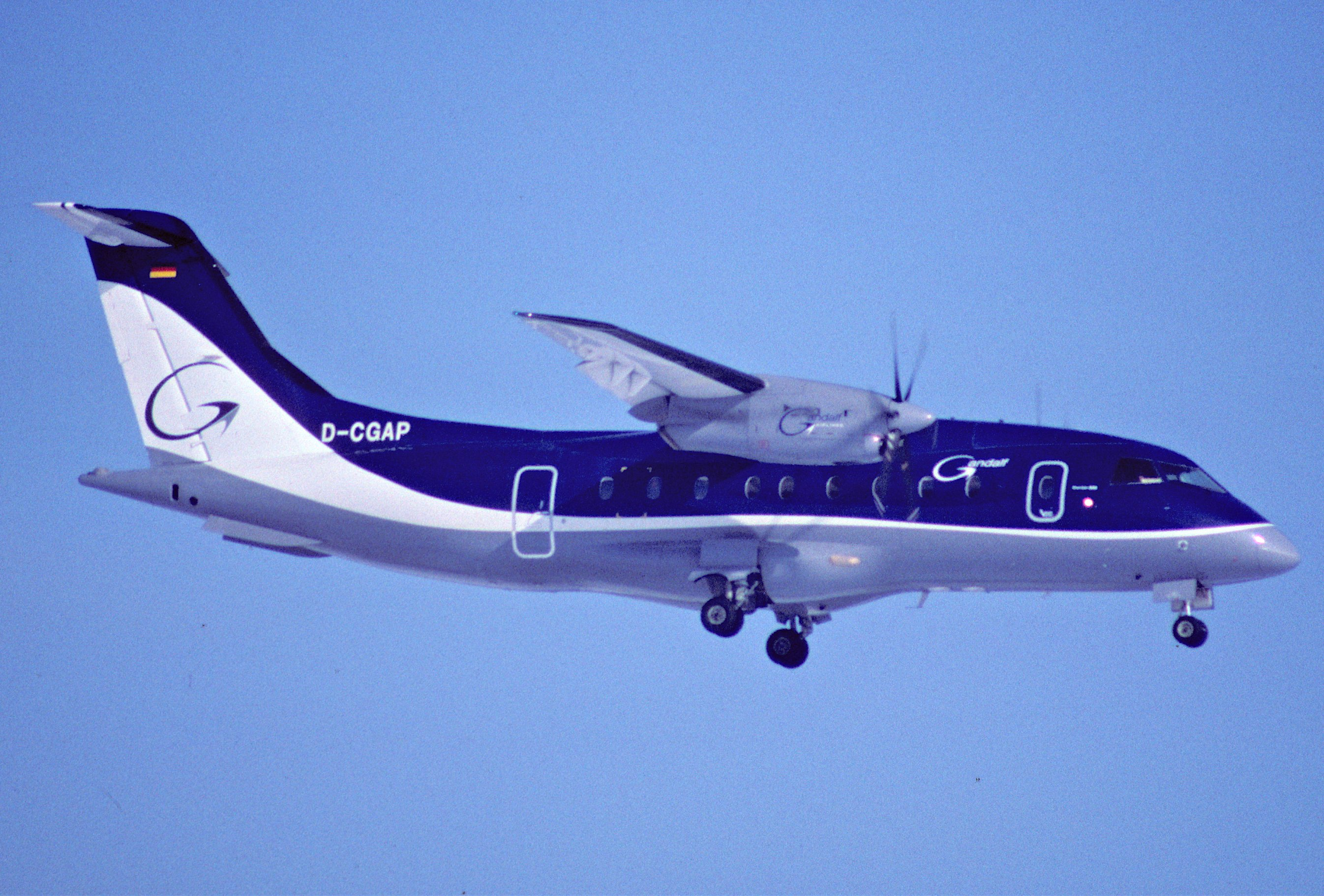
Dornier 328-110

Gandalf Airlines was a regional airline based at Orio al Serio Airport near Milan, Italy, which was operational from March 28, 1998 to 2004. The idea behind the airline, when it was launched on the market, was that there was a niche of customers willing to pay a premium for quality service.

The airline operated a fleet of Dornier 328 aircraft in both jet and turboprop versions to a number of European destinations: Barcelona, Bari, Brescia, Brussels, Catania, Florence, Madrid, Milan, Paris (Charles de Gaulle), Paris (Orly), Pisa, Rome, Stuttgart, Trieste and Verona. Gandalf also had an agreement with Air France to feed the French carrier's international flights at Paris (Charles de Gaulle airport). The company experienced a good expansion phase in the late 1990s, but the crisis of 11 September 2001 and the subsequent global economic situation caused a sudden reduction in travellers. Gandalf then attempted to convert into a traditional airline, but without success.The initial difficulties were also reflected in the change of management: Carlo Peretti Chairman, Carlo Cattaneo President, Bruno azzalini Managing Director. By November 2003, Gandalf Airlines had cut most of its routes due to financial difficulties. Flight operations were halted on February 19, 2004. Bankruptcy was declared on the 29th by the Parma court, while on February 14, 2011, a request was made for the indictment of 16 people.

== Fleet ==
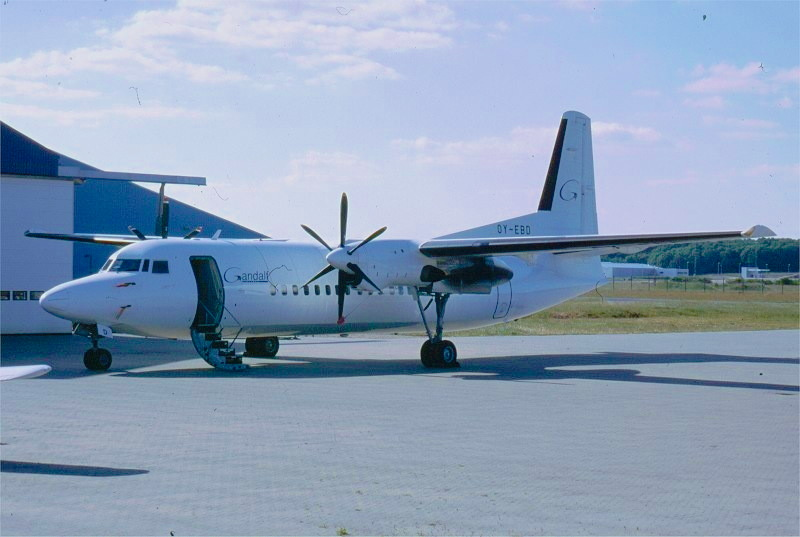
A Fokker 50 which was readied but never flew with the airline

Fleet
Aircraft	Total	Introduced	Retired	Notes
ATR 42–300	1	1999	1999	TS-LBA leased from Tuninter
Dornier 328-110	5	1999	2004	all with German (D-) registration
Dornier 328JET-300	9	1999	2004	all with German (D-) registration

== See also ==
- List of defunct airlines of Italy
