= Aerea Teseo =

Teseo
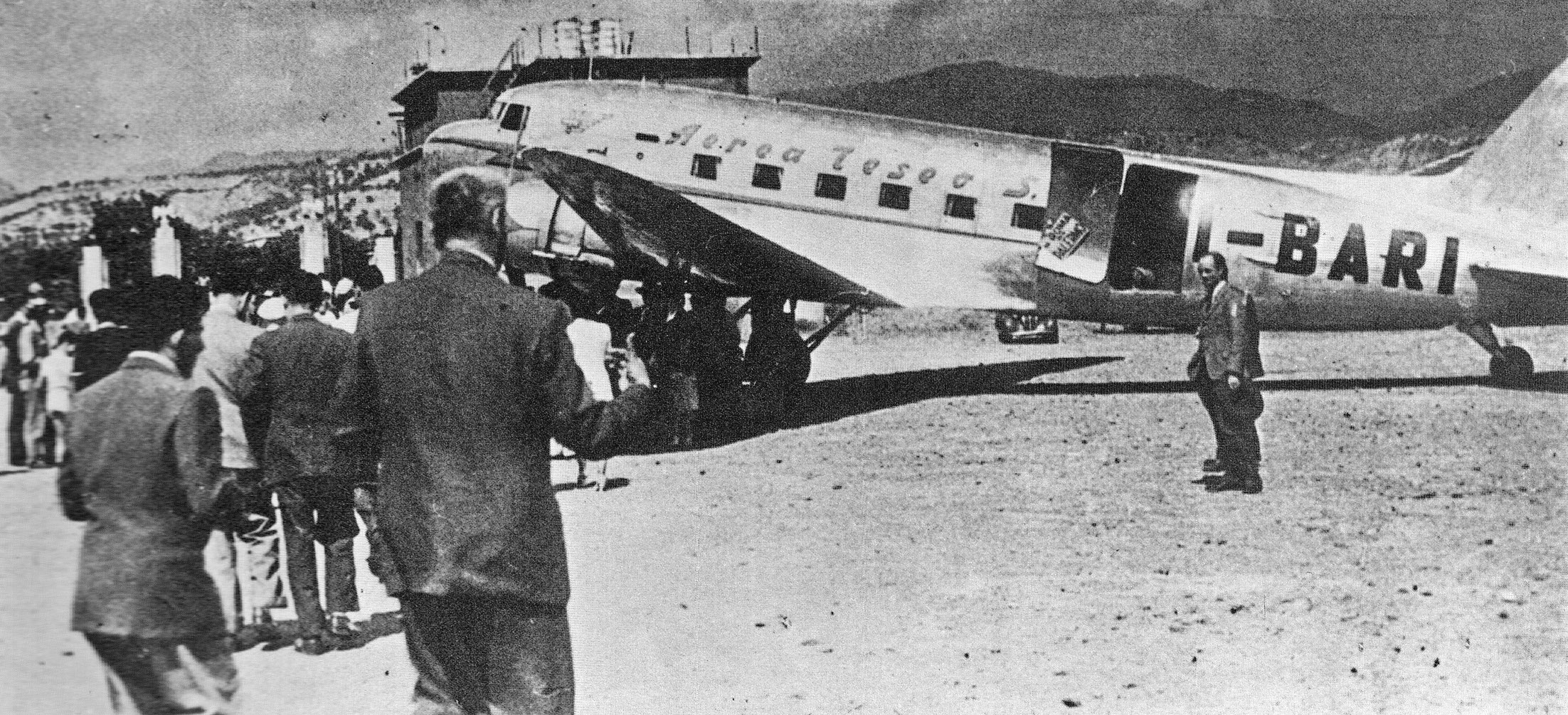
- Founded: 1946
- Commenced operations: 1947
- Ceased operations: 1948
- Hubs: Florence (Firenze)
- Fleet size: 8
- Headquarters: Firenze
- Key people: Attorney Adone Zoli, President; Eng. Giovanni Caproni, Vice President; Attilio Morrocchi, General Manager

Aerea Teseo (also known as Teseo) is a defunct airline based in Italy. It was a privately held air carrier founded in Florence in the years immediately following the Second World War. It went bankrupt in July 1948 due to the financial difficulties it had encountered since its inception, aggravated by an accident at the beginning of the same year.

== Early history ==
Aerea Teseo S.A. was founded in September 1945 by a group of Florentine entrepreneurs. Among the investors were Giovanni Caproni and Angelo Ambrosini, both prominent figures in the aircraft manufacturing industry. The first aircraft, a Douglas C-47 already converted to carry passengers, was transferred on September 6, 1946, from Naples to Florence with a false registration. Several months passed while waiting for authorization to begin scheduled flights. Meanwhile, the fleet had grown to include eight Douglas DC3s, derived from Douglas C-47s and converted to carry 22 passengers. These twin-engine aircraft had been used by the United States Army during World War II, and were later abandoned in still acceptable condition at Naples-Capodichino airport..

Flight operations began on 15 April 1947 with a series of routes extending from Northern Italy (Milan) to Sicily (Palermo), with intermediate stopovers in Bologna, Florence, Rome and Reggio Calabria. On 17 September, international flights were commenced, first with Florence-Rome-Barcelona, later followed by one to Brindisi-Istanbul-Ankara.

== Accident ==
On February 20, 1948, the Douglas DC-3, registered I-REGI, crashed near a village in the province of Livorno. The impact killed the three crew members and almost all the passengers. The flight was originally a direct Florence-Rome one. However, it made an intermediate stop at Pisa airport to pick up some passengers who had been stranded the previous day. It seems that the pilot (who was flying towards Rome) had opted for a low-altitude flight, below the cloud base. Due to worsening weather conditions, the cloud base was actually at the same altitude as the aircraft, which, entering the clouds and losing track of its position, deviated from its planned route, impacting a hill.

== Closure ==
The accident negatively affected the company's image, which suspended flights and declared bankruptcy on April 25. The fleet resumed operations exactly a month later, but financial difficulties were clearly evident. Despite substantial financing from a Florence bank, the last flights were performed in June 1948. General Manager Morrocchi himself urged the company to file for bankruptcy.
