= Avioligure =

Short-lived Italian regional airline

IATA	ICAO	Call sign
TF	—	—
- Founded: 1975
- Commenced operations: 1976
- Ceased operations: 1979
- Hubs: Florence
- Fleet size: 2
- Key people: Ennio Frignani (chairman) Adelio Pompei (managing director) Luciano Nustrini (chief pilot)

Avioligure is an defunct regional airline based in Italy. It tried to restore essential scheduled flights to and from Florence.

== History ==
The strong pressure and competition by ATI in the regional routes and financial problems had forced Aertirrena to succumb in 1975. In the aftermath of the company bankruptcy the assets were taken over by Avioligure. In February 1975, the newly established company bought all that was left of value of Aertirrena. Florence was confirmed as the headquarter but Genoa became the operating base. Both former Aertirrena Yak-40s were in excellent condition and had flown approximately 1,000 hours each, considering their useful operational life was 30,000, but bureaucratic delays delayed the start of flight operations.

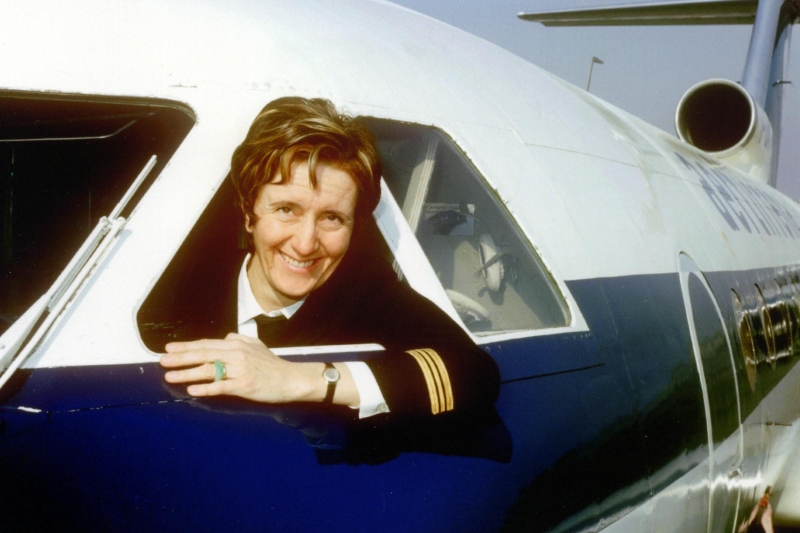
Fiorenza de Bernardi, first female commercial pilot from Italy, in the cockpit of a Yakovlev Yak-40

On 8 April 1976, flight schedules were opened from Florence-Peretola airport to Rome and Milan; later Turin was also reached. The first international route – Florence to Zurich – was inaugurated on 26 May 1978. In 1979, the company leased a Fokker F27, but was never authorized to operate it. Scheduled flights were discontinued in the autumn of 1979. In March 1980, Avioligure went bankrupt.

== Fleet ==
Avioligure consisted of the following aircraft:

Aircraft type	Total	In service	Struck off	Remarks
Yak-40	2	1975	1980	
Fokker F27	1	1979	1980	never operated
