= Italian Civil Aviation Authority =

- Italian: Ente Nazionale per l'Aviazione Civile
- Emblem of the Italian Republic

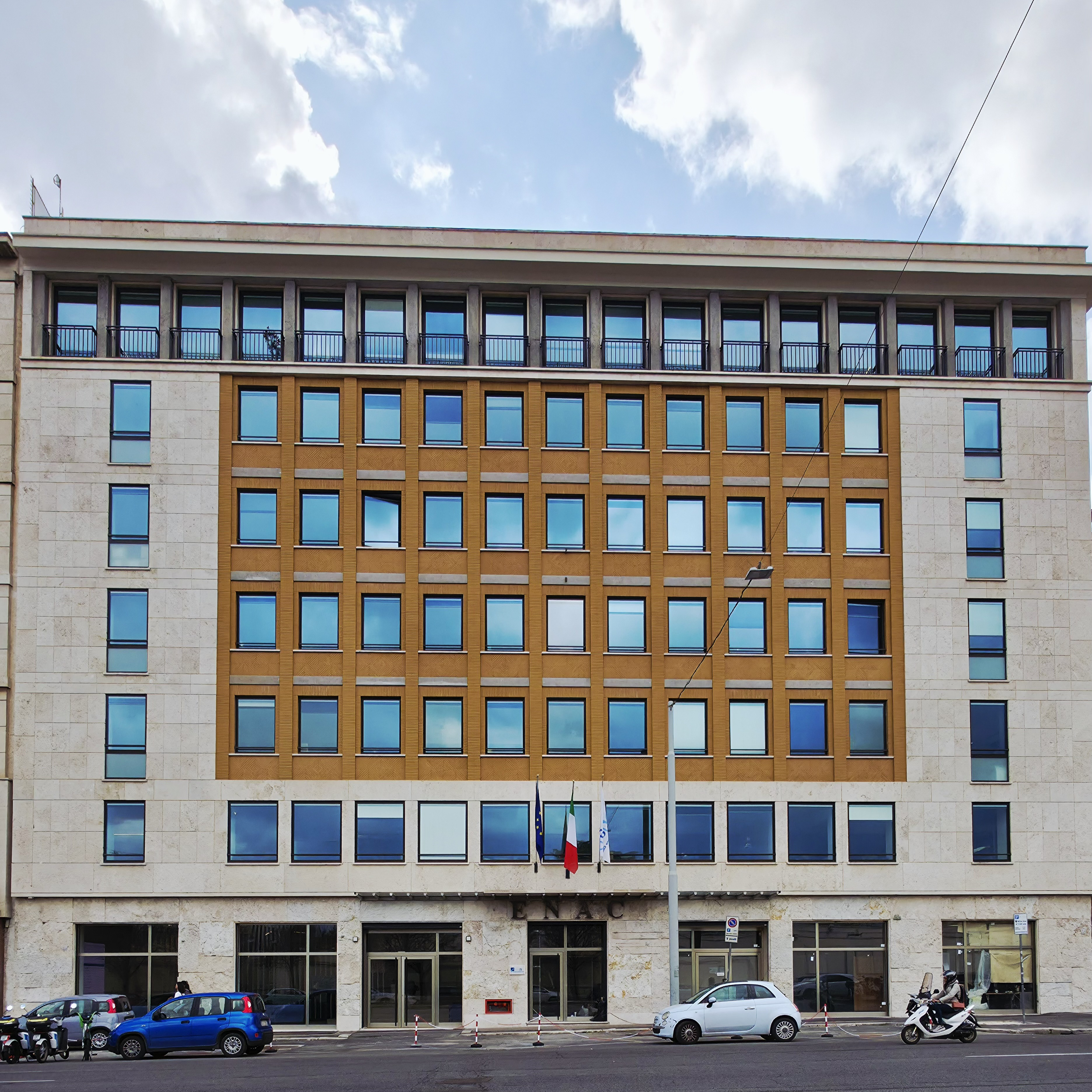

Agency overview
- Formed: July 25, 1997; 29 years ago
- Jurisdiction: Government of Italy
- Headquarters: Viale Castro Pretorio, 118, 00185 Roma RM, Italy; 41°54′24.4″N 12°30′18″E
- Agency executives: Pierluigi Di Palma, President; Alexander D’Orsogna, General Director
- Parent department: Ministry of Infrastructure and Transport
- Website: http://www.enac.gov.it/

The Ente Nazionale per l'Aviazione Civile (ENAC), English: Italian Civil Aviation Authority, is the civil aviation authority of Italy. Its headquarters are located in Rome. Legislative Decree no.250/97 established the existence of ENAC on 25 July 1997.

== History ==
The Ente Nazionale per l'Aviazione Civile was created by a Legislation on 25 July 1997.

In 2020 ENAC was responsible to oversee airlines' compliance with Italian COVID-19 regulations.

== Major functions ==
Article 2 of the founding decree 250/1997 established that ENAC:

- technical regulation and inspection, sanctioning, certification, authorization, coordination and control activities, as well as keeping of registers and registers in the matters of competence;
- rationalization and modification of the procedures relating to airport services, in accordance with current legislation and in relation to the guarantee, guidance and planning tasks exercised;
- coordination activities with the National Flight Assistance Body and with the Air Force, within the scope of their respective competences for flight assistance activities;
- relations with national and international bodies, companies and organizations operating in the civil aviation sector and representation at international organizations, also with delegation from the Minister of Transport and Navigation;
- investigation of the acts concerning tariffs, taxes and airport charges for the adoption of the consequent provisions of the Minister of Transport and Navigation;
- definition and control of the quality parameters of airport and air transport services within the limits set by the regulation referred to in article 10, paragraph 13, of law no. 537;
- regulation, examination and evaluation of airport regulatory plans, intervention programs and airport investment plans, as well as possible participation in the management of airports of pre-eminent tourist and social or strategic-economic interest

Article 687 of the Navigation Code reads:

"The National Civil Aviation Authority (ENAC), in compliance with the guiding powers of the Minister of Infrastructure and Transport, as well as without prejudice to the specific competences of the other aeronautical bodies, acts as the sole technical regulatory, certification and supervisory authority in the civil aviation sector, through its central and peripheral structures, and ensures the presence and application of aeronautical quality systems that comply with Community regulations "

The body represents Italy in the major international civil aviation organizations, such as the International Civil Aviation Organization, European Civil Aviation Conference, European Aviation Safety Agency, and Eurocontrol, with which it has continuous dialogue and collaboration and in which he also holds leadership positions.
