= Abruzzo Airport =

Airport in Pescara, Italy

Abruzzo Airport Aeroporto internazionale d'Abruzzo "Pasquale Liberi"

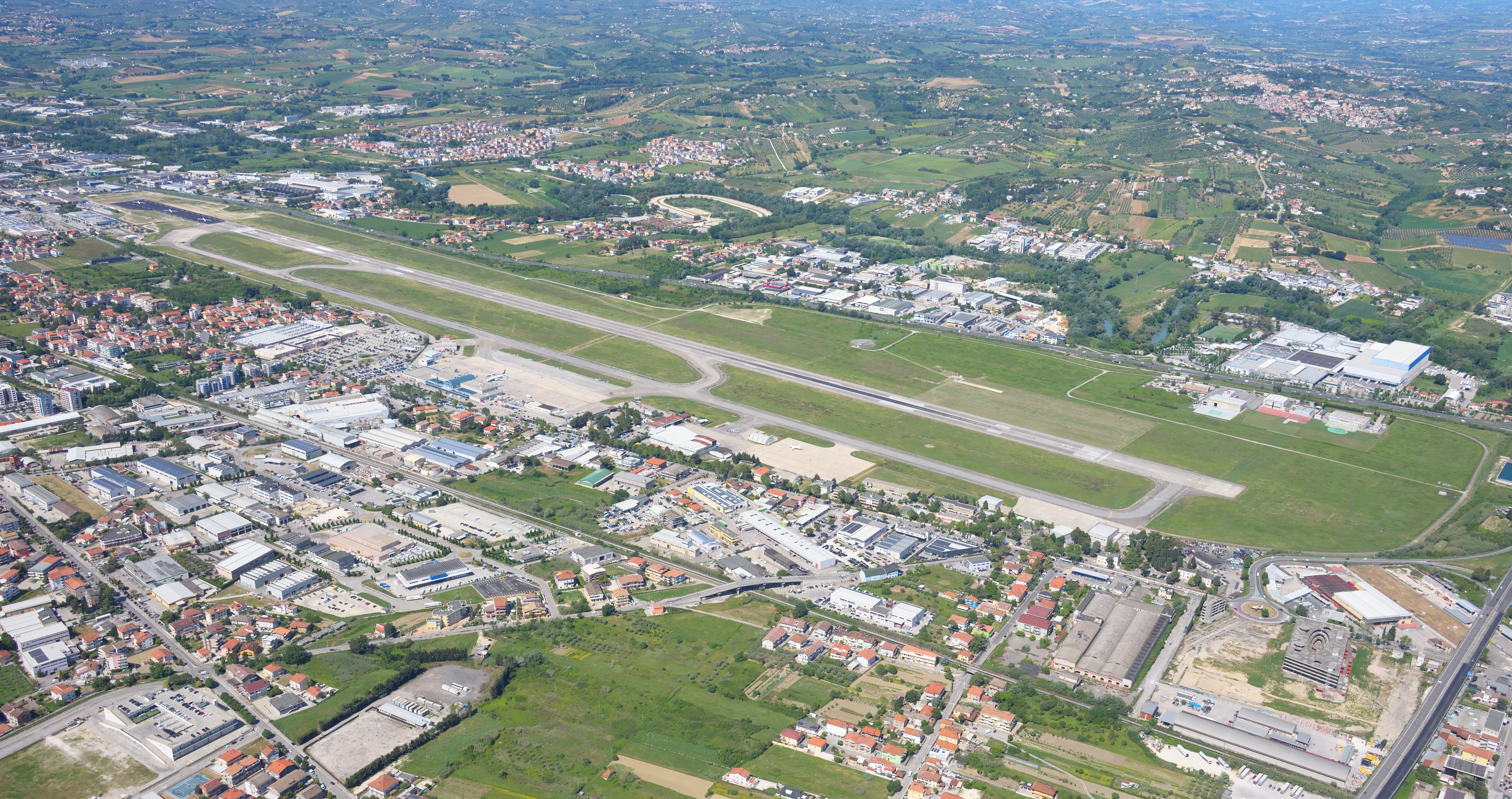
- IATA: PSR; ICAO: LIBP

Summary
- Airport type: Public
- Operator: SAGA S.p.A.
- Serves: Pescara
- Elevation AMSL: 48 ft (15 m)
- Coordinates: 42°26′14″N 014°11′14″E
- Website: abruzzoairport.com

Map
- Location within Abruzzo Location within Italy

Runways
Direction	Length		Surface
Direction	m	ft	Surface
04/22	2,419	7,936	Asphalt

Statistics (2024)
- Passengers: 847.512
- Passenger change 22–23: ▼ -2.9
- Aircraft movements: 13.756
- Movements change 22–23: ▼12.5
- Source: Italian AIP at EUROCONTROL; Statistics from Assaeroporti

Abruzzo Airport (IATA: PSR, ICAO: LIBP) is an international airport serving Pescara, Italy. It is located approximately 4 kilometres (2.5 mi) from the centre of Pescara, about 180 km (110 mi) from Rome, a 2-hour drive by car on a motorway across the Apennine Mountains. The airport is located on the state road 5 Via Tiburtina Valeria and is connected to important roads (Autostrada A25, Autostrada A14, SS714 Tangenziale di Pescara) and railway connections (Rome–Sulmona–Pescara railway, Adriatic railway).

Being the only international airport in the Abruzzo region, it plays a fundamental role for the transportation and aerial connection of the area and for that of neighbouring regions; catering also for people from Molise, Marche and the Gargano area. The airport has seen a steady increase in the number of transit passengers over the years, mainly due to a growth in low-cost airlines and flights. The terminal built in 1996 has been extended in 2011 and recently restructured in 2018.

== History ==
=== Early years ===
The history of the airport starts in 1917 when, after the bombing of Pescara by bombers of the k.u.k. Luftfahrtruppen, the aerial component of the Austro-Hungarian Army, along the Via Tiburtina Valeria road a military airfield is built by the Regio Esercito, which arrived on 26 October 1917 with two Farman 14. On 31 July 1918 the 302° Squadron is formed, equipped with biplanes Ansaldo SVA, among the best fighter-bombers of the time. From 1921, the airport has been named after Pasquale Liberi, an aviator friend of the famous poet Gabriele d'Annunzio. In 1927 the airport was extended to 50 hectares and modernized.

In the 1930s, with the start of commercial aviation, the airline Società Aerea Mediterranea (SAM) started in 1933 a triweekly service from Pescara to Rome Urbe Airport, with an intermediate stop at the airfield of Piana di Bagno near L'Aquila.

After WWII, the first airline to restart commercial service was Società anonima di navigazione aerea transadriatica (Transadriatica), which inaugurated the service Pescara-Roma-Urbe on 5 May 1947 using a Douglas DC-3. At the same time, Transadriatica started another interesting route: Venezia-Ancona-Pescara-Brindisi-Catania. Furthermore, the airline Avio Linee Italiane decided to start a route connecting North to South Italy for the first time: Milan-Pescara-Foggia-Bari-Brindisi.

=== 1960s ===
Itavia, constituted in 1958 to operate between secondary airports not served by Alitalia, opened its first route Pescara-Roma-Urbe on 15 July 1959 with a 8-seats de Havilland Dove. With the development of Itavia also the number of routes increased between the end of 1960s and beginning of 1970s, including Roma, Milano, Ancona, Crotone, Forlì, Lecce, Bergamo, Bologna, Treviso-Venezia, Catania and Palermo.

=== 1970s ===
In 1973, the English historian Bruce Barrymore Halpenny, then living in Abruzzo, organised a British Caledonian BAC 111 to take off from Genoa Airport to Pescara to test the feasibility of the approach and landing at Pescara of a large commercial aircraft. With the British Caledonian chief pilot being an ex-RAF pilot and Halpenny (also Ex-RAF) on board this maneuver was successfully accomplished, opening up the airport and the region for tourism. Halpenny then arranged for a British Caledonian BAC 111 to take off from Gatwick Airport, land in Pescara and return to Gatwick, demonstrating the feasibility of commercial flights to the airport.

As of 1 February 1979, Itavia was forced to suspend its flights to Pescara due to the revision of the minimum landing requirements on some Italian airports implemented by ANPAC, the National Association of Civil Aviation Pilots. The raise of the requirements in question (distance to the runway and altitude at which the pilot must decide whether to continue the landing) were dependent on proper radio support (such as ILS, Instrument Landing System) and a clear view to allow the landing of aircraft in conditions of poor visibility. Such instruments were not installed at the time at the airport. Itavia itself was never going to be back at the airport, as it ceased operations in June 1980, after the Ustica disaster.

=== 1980s ===
After the dark period during which the airport did not have any connection, the situation improved with the reopening of a route to Milano through Ancona, operated by Aermediterranea, a company belonging to Istituto per la Ricostruzione Industriale (IRI) and controlled by Alitalia, which was operated between 1981 and 1983. From 1984, the flight to Milan Linate Airport was managed by another company of the Alitalia group: Aero Trasporti Italiani (ATI), based in Naples. In 1988, it was the turn of Alitalia itself to operate the much-sought direct connection to Milan, using the modern McDonnell Douglas MD-80 jetliners until 1994.

=== 1990s ===
Air One was founded as Aliadriatica in 1983 as a flight school and air taxi company for services in Abruzzo. From 1994, it was this company who took operation of the route to Milan. In 1996, the current terminal opened and the old building was converted for technical and logistical support. The project enabled the airport to offer more comfort and efficiency of service.

=== Developments since the 2000s ===
In 2010, Canadian airline Air Transat began flying a seasonal nonstop flight to Toronto operated with an Airbus A310. This service was discontinued in 2012

The development of the airport, which has seen an increment of passengers from 114,000 in 2000 to over 600,000 in 2015, is mainly due to the low-cost phenomenon that has affected all of Europe and most small Italian airports, benefiting Pescara. Today the airport has a catchment area of over 600,000 passengers annually and connects the city of Pescara and the entire region with many Italian and European destinations, in particular with the services offered by the airlines Ryanair and Volotea.

== Redevelopment and expansion plans ==
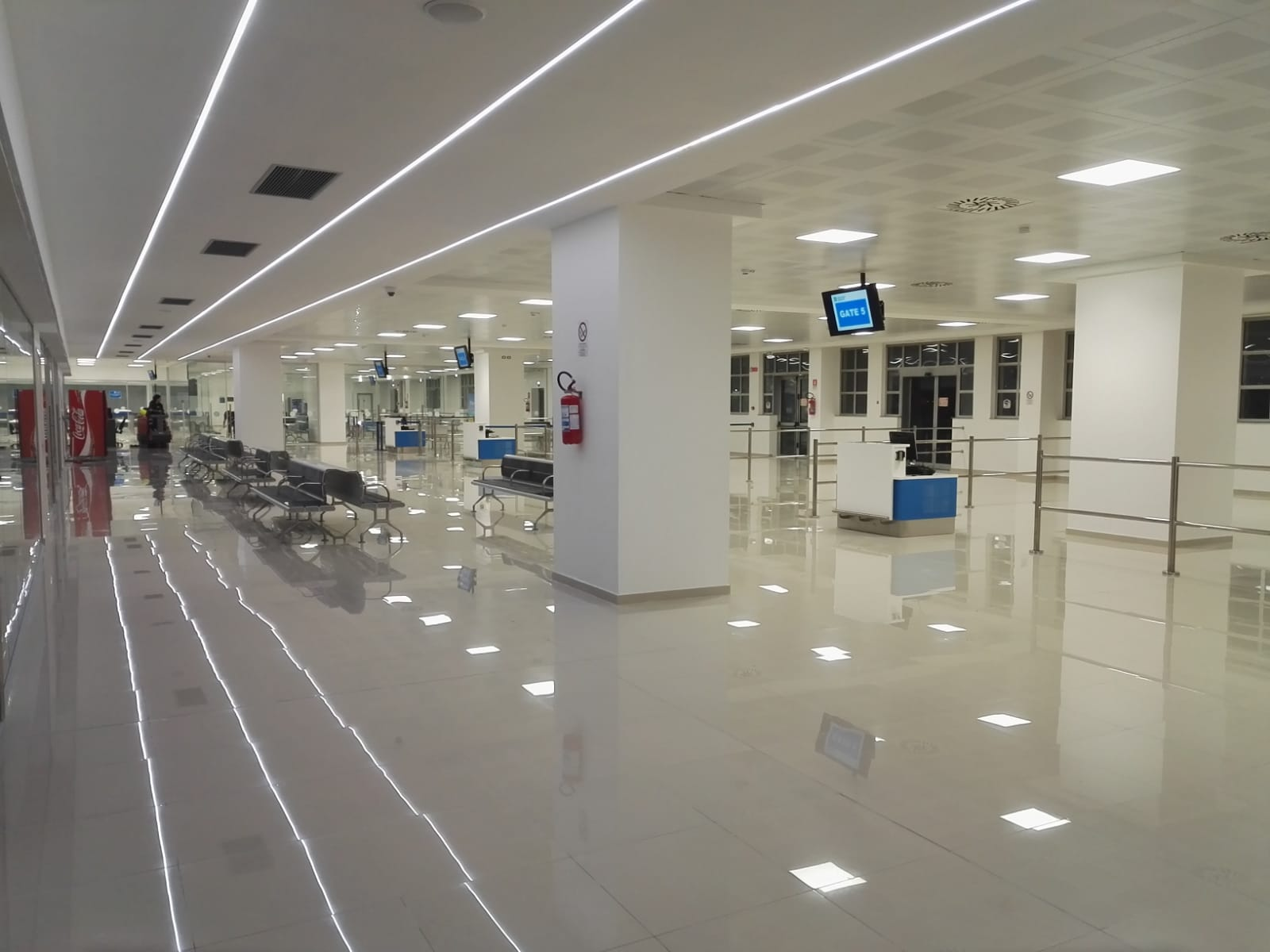
New departures hall

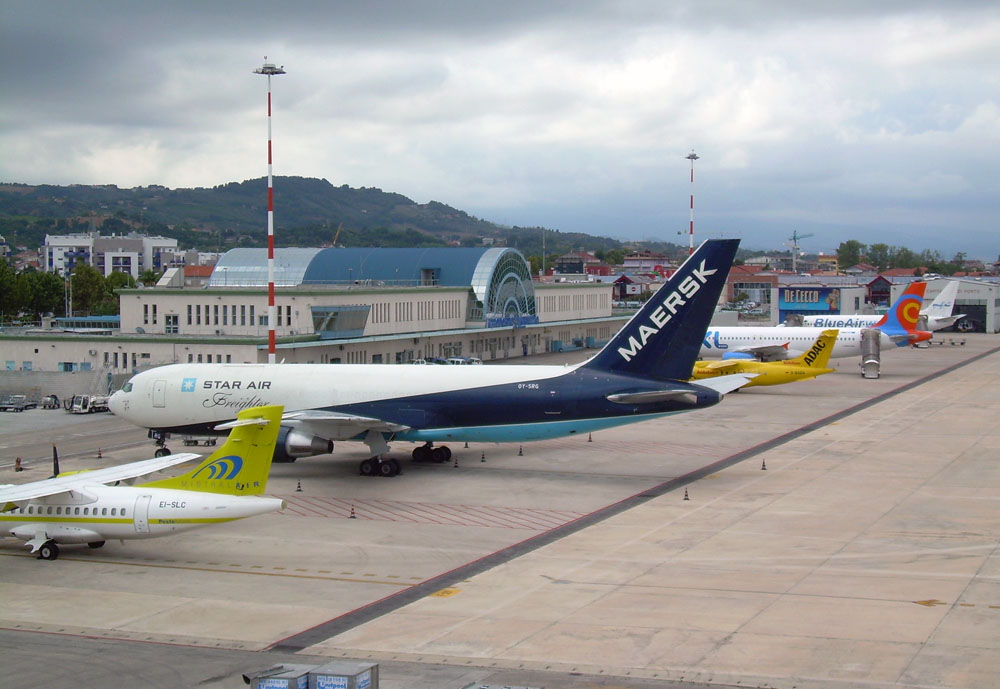
Apron view

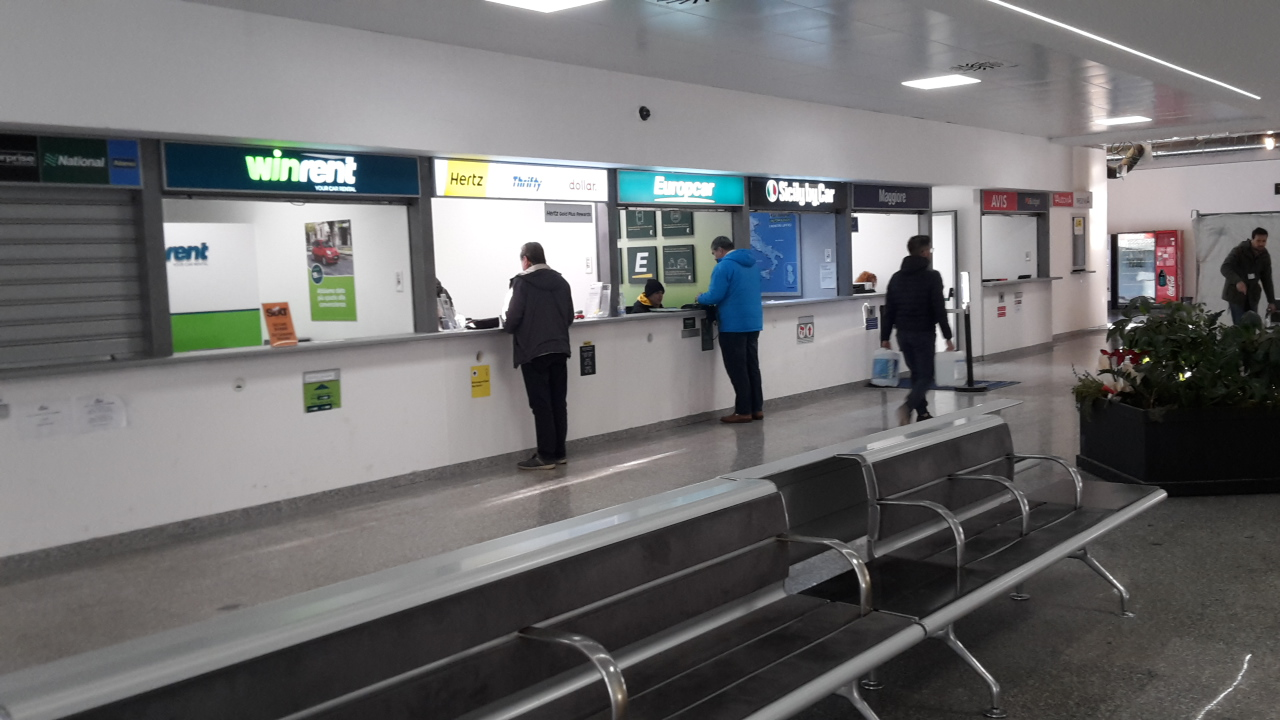
Rent a car in arrivals area

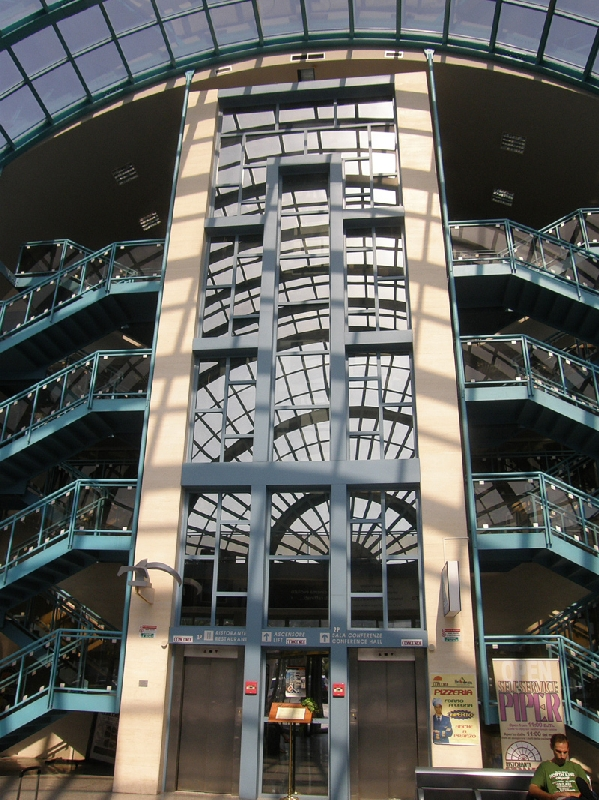
Interior terminal

A series of development works have been carried out between 2008 and 2018 at the airport. Those completed at July 2019 include:

- Building of a new arrival hall (completed in September 2018);
- Building of a new departures hall with new gates, bar and toilettes (completed in November 2018);
- Redesign and expansion of the duty-free area (bar, shops, rent a car) to 7,800 m^{2} (84,000 ft^{2}) (from the former 6,300 m^{2} [68,000 ft^{2}]) and placed in the arrival hall (completed in July 2019);
- Retrofitting and regulation works (completed in late 2008);
- Expansion of the apron 2 (completed in January 2009);
- Expansion of the airport to the west (completed in 2011);
- Building of offices and accommodation for the Flight Police Department (completed in May 2014);
- Resurfacing of the runway (completed in March 2017);
- Modernization and redesign of the parking areas (completed in November 2017);
- Building of a Business room (completed in November 2018);
- Renovation of the toilets of departures and domestic arrivals areas;
- The union of domestic and international arrivals halls;
- Modernization of the baggage belts;
- New trim and fittings in the redeveloped areas
- Expansion of the airport security and video surveillance systems;

The master plan of development and modernization of the airport includes further upgrading works of both the airside and landside areas, for an overall cost of 33 Euro million. The works include:

=== Landside area ===
- Construction of a plant for the treatment of water;
- The installation of a photovoltaic system on the roof;
- Replacement of the computer infrastructure;
- Renovation of the air conditioning system.

=== Airside area ===
- Removal of ex-military structures previously sold to privates, to increase the number of parking spaces for aircraft;
- Construction of two new hangars and a cargo area;
- Construction of new helipads for the law enforcement helicopters and a new small square for the Coast Guard;
- Lengthening of the runway and construction of a new multi-storey garage for cars;
- Rail link.

Currently the building of the old passenger terminal has been converted to a warehouse; it was employed by the airline cargo TNT Airlines up to December 2008 and by Maersk Air until October 2010.

== Airlines and destinations ==
The following airlines operate regular scheduled and charter flights at Pescara Abruzzo Airport:

Airlines	Destinations
Luxair	Luxembourg
Ryanair	Bergamo, Bucharest–Otopeni, Cagliari, Catania, Charleroi, Hahn, Kaunas, Kraków, London–Stansted, Milan–Malpensa, Tirana, Trapani, Turin, Valencia, Wroclaw; Seasonal: Alghero, Girona, Malta, Memmingen, Prague, Weeze
Wizz Air	Tirana

== Statistics ==
Abruzzo Airport movements
Year	Passengers	%	Movements	%	Cargo (tons)	%
1996	71,908		4,052		152	
1997	72,962 ▲	2,86	4,618 ▲	13,9	195 ▲	28,3
1998	104,000 ▲	42,54	6,390 ▲	38,4	56 ▼	-71,3
1999	105,500 ▲	1,44	6,310 ▼	1,25	476 ▲	750
2000	114,024 ▲	8,08	9,940 ▲	57,5	2,851 ▲	499
2001	153,227 ▲	34,4	6,775 ▼	-31,8	3,115 ▲	9,3
2002	295,875 ▲	93,1	11,559 ▲	70,6	1,913 ▼	-38,6
2003	301,773 ▲	2,0	10,932 ▼	-5,4	1,795 ▼	-6,2
2004	334,998 ▲	10,9	10,075 ▼	-7,8	2,151 ▲	19,8
2005	350,447 ▲	4,7	10,339 ▲	2,6	2,390 ▲	11,1
2006	340,699 ▼	-2,8	12,139 ▲	17,4	2,849 ▲	19,2
2007	371,247 ▲	9,0	12,085 ▼	-0,4	3,291 ▲	15,5
2008	402,845 ▲	8,5	11,128 ▼	-7,9	3,339 ▲	1,5
2009	409,045 ▲	1,5	9,773 ▼	-12,2	2,431 ▼	-27,2
2010	461,086 ▲	12,7	7,971 ▼	-18,4	2,116 ▼	-13,0
2011	550,062 ▲	19,3	7,827 ▼	-1,8	1,472 ▼	-43,7
2012	563,187 ▲	2,4	8,284 ▲	5,8	1,221 ▲	1,8
2013	548,217 ▼	-2,7	8,017 ▼	-3,2	721.1 ▼	-40,9
2014	556,679 ▲	1,5	6,738 ▼	-15,95	44 ▼	-93,9
2015	613,427 ▲	10,2	10,469 ▲	55,4	42 ▼	-4,2
2016	572,217 ▼	-6,6	8,850 ▼	-14,3	69.5 ▲	65,5
2017	667,831 ▲	+16,7	15,331 ▲	+73,2	52 ▼	-25,2
2018	666,691 ▼	-0,2	13,456 ▼	-12,2	72 ▲	38,5
2019	703,386 ▲	5,5	12,880 ▼	-4,3	276 ▲	283,3
2020	173,156 ▼	-75,4	10,397 ▼	-19,3	44 ▼	-84,1
2021	381,241 ▲	120,2	11,827 ▲	13,8	21 ▼	-52,3
2022	715,690 ▲					
2023	872,701 ▲					

== Ground transportation ==
The airport is connected to the center of Pescara with the TUA (regional public transportation company) bus lines 8 and 38, with which it is possible to reach Piazza della Repubblica, the Bus Terminal serving domestic and international destinations. The bus lines 8 and 38 pass also near the main railway station in the city, Pescara railway station. The airport is connected to the center of Pescara and Chieti with the TUA Chieti-Pescara line, with which it is possible to reach the university campus "G. D'Annunzio" in Chieti Scalo. The TUA stop is opposite to the pedestrian exit of the airport park on Via Tiburtina Valeria.

== See also ==
- List of airports in Italy
