= BQI =

BQI or bqi may refer to:

- BQI, the ICAO code for Aermediterranea, a defunct Italian airline
- bqi, the ISO 639-3 code for Bakhtiari dialect, Iran
