= Flight 12 =

Flight 12 may refer to:

- Aeroflot Flight 012, crashed on 13 July 1963
- Continental Airlines Flight 12, crashed on 1 July 1965
- Aero Trasporti Italiani Flight 12, crashed on 14 September 1979
- China Airlines Flight 012, crashed on 7 December 1992
- Starship flight test 12, a test flight of SpaceX Starship in May 2026
