= Itavia Flight 703 =

1963 aviation accident

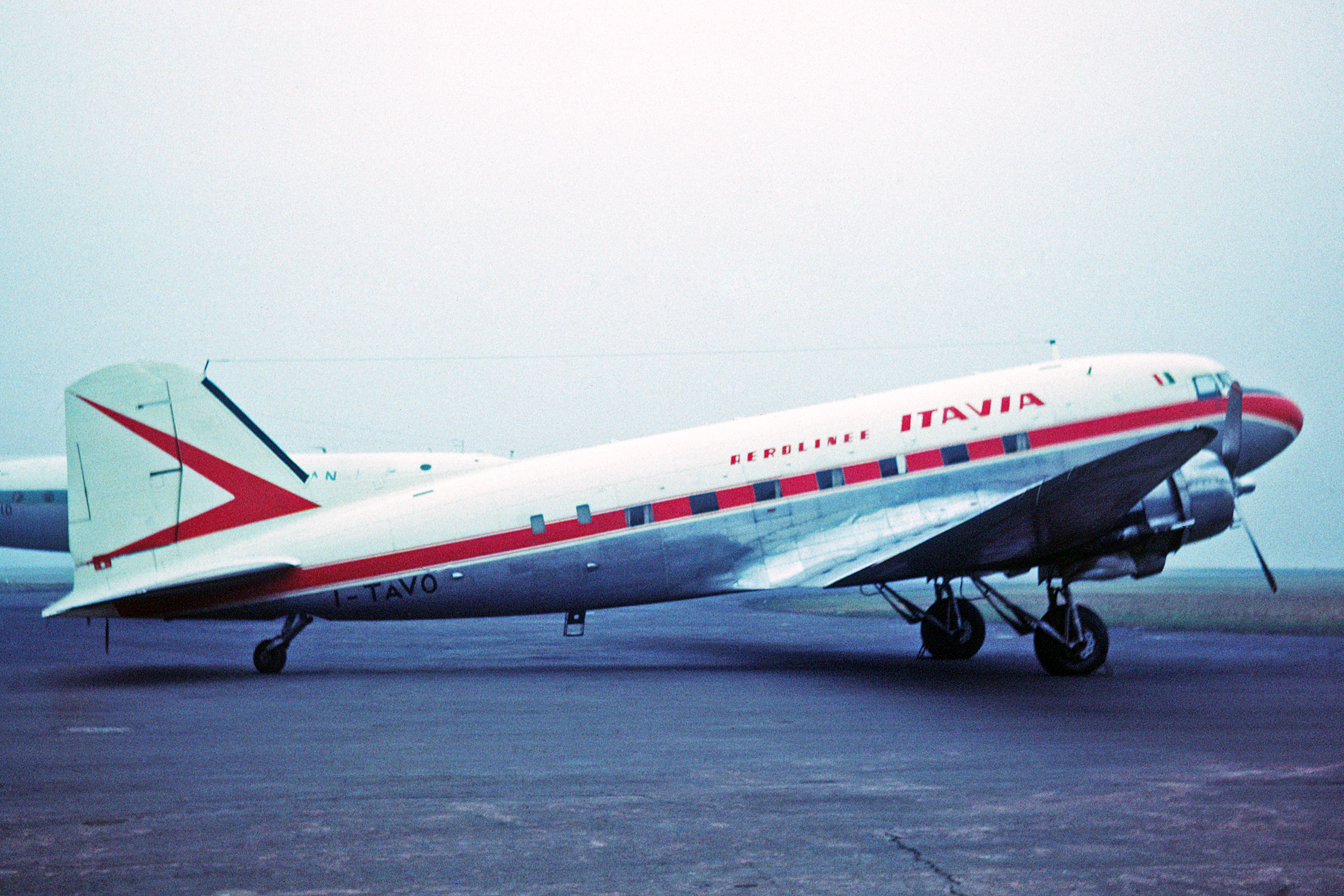
- Similar aircraft to the one involved

Accident
- Date: 30 March 1963
- Summary: Controlled flight into terrain
- Site: 6.5 km northwest of Sora, Lazio, Italy

Aircraft
- Aircraft type: Douglas C-47 Skytrain
- Operator: Itavia
- Registration: I-TAVI
- Flight origin: Abruzzo Airport, Pescara, Italy
- Destination: Rome Ciampino Airport, Rome, Italy
- Occupants: 8
- Passengers: 5
- Crew: 3
- Fatalities: 8
- Survivors: 0

Itavia Flight 703 was a scheduled passenger flight from Abruzzo Airport to Ciampino Airport in Italy. On 30 March 1963, the Douglas C-47 Skytrain operating the route crashed into mountainous terrain near Sora, Lazio, killing all eight people on board. The investigation concluded that the accident was a case of controlled flight into terrain by pilot error.

== Aircraft ==
The aircraft involved in the accident was a Douglas C-47B-35-DK (Douglas DC-3) registered I-TAVI. It was manufactured in 1945 with the manufacturer serial number 33225/16477. By the time of the accident it had accumulated 13,941 airframe hours.

== Accident ==
The flight carried five passengers and three crew members. The crew consisted of pilot-in-command Ernesto Roggero, co-pilot Erminio Bonfanti, and trainee flight attendant Luigi Politta. Both pilots held a valid airline transport license and were qualified to operate the DC-3. Roggero had a total of 10,731 flight hours (2,296 on the DC-3) and Bonfanti had 832 hours, all on the DC-3. The passengers were Giuseppe Mancini, Marco di Michele, Marvin Gelber, Sergeant Angelo Lombruno, and Count Nicolò Marcello.

Flight 703 took off from Pescara at 17:36 GMT under an instrument flight rules plan and climbed to its cruising altitude of 10,000 ft (3,000 m). The pilot requested radar guidance from a Pescara defense radar, which was not normally available for civil aircraft. The first part of the flight was intentionally carried out south of the direct route to avoid heavy cloud formations. The radar lost the aircraft at 18:12.

At 18:18 the pilot requested a clearance to the Rome non-directional beacon (NDB). The flight was later cleared to proceed to the NDB and descend to 6,000 ft (1,800 m). At 18:28 the pilot requested to descend further. He was instructed to contact Ciampino tower but failed to do so. The aircraft was unable to tune in to the NDB and had to avoid the clouds as the radio compass was not working properly. Around 18:32 the pilot reported he could see the ground but visual contact was later lost. At 18:35 he was cleared to proceed to the Ostia VHF omnidirectional range (VOR), however he reported that his VOR was not giving reliable information.

The DC-3 struck Mount Serra Alta, 6.5 km (4.0 mi; 3.5 nmi) northwest of Sora, Lazio at around 18:37, destroying the aircraft and killing all eight occupants on board. Had the airplane flown 50 m (160 ft) higher, the crash could have been avoided. The wreckage was reached on 1 April and the bodies were recovered on 2 April. The Carabinieri searched the area and collected materials for investigation.

== Cause ==
The investigation determined the causes to be:

- Errors by the pilot in determining his position
- Particularly adverse weather conditions over the last segment of the route flown at night
- Failure to report to air traffic control the departures from the flight route
- Concurrence of a series of facts and circumstances that all played against the pilot
