= Itavia =

Italian airline (1958–1981)

Aerolinee Itavia

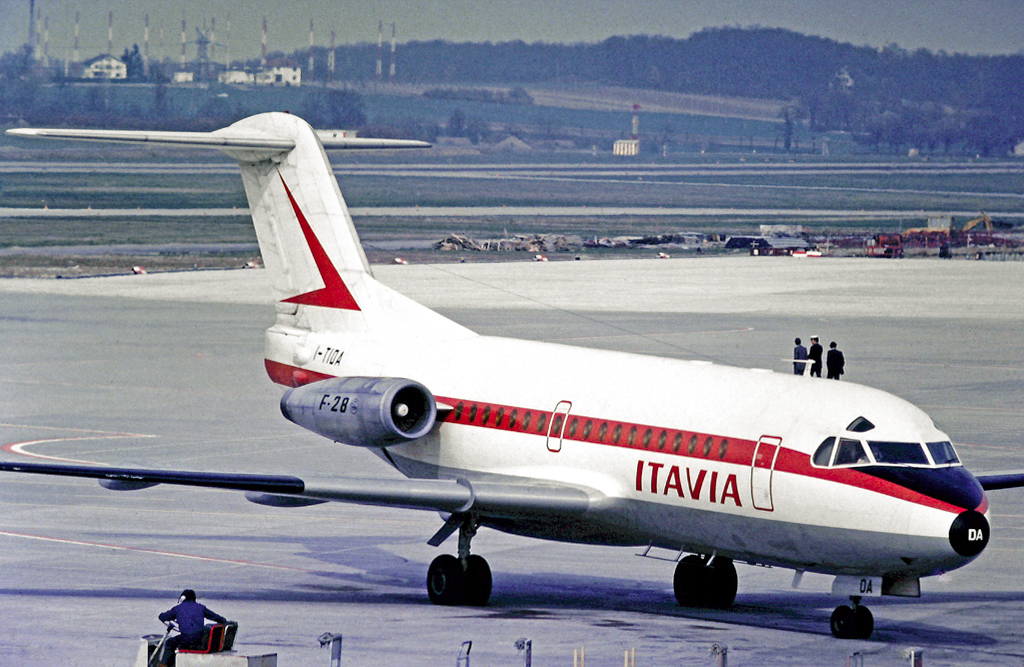
- Itavia Fokker F28 at Geneva Airport in 1974
IATA	ICAO	Call sign
IH	IHS	ITAVIA
- Founded: 13 October 1958
- Commenced operations: 1959
- Ceased operations: 10 December 1980
- Hubs: Rome Ciampino Airport
- Headquarters: Rome, Italy

Itavia was an Italian airline founded in 1958 and based at Rome Ciampino Airport. It was headquartered in Rome. During the late 1960s it became one of the main private airlines of Italy, and during the following decade it was considered, behind the Alitalia-ATI partnership, the "second force" of Italian commercial aviation. Indeed, the company was instrumental in the development of previously neglected airports – Ancona, Bergamo, Bologna – and in the emergence of a new southern airport, Lamezia Terme (S. Eufemia). The airline's collapse occurred in the early 1980s, following the loss of Flight 870, also known as the "Ustica Disaster".

== History ==
=== The beginning and the 60s ===
The company was founded on 13 October 1958, under the name Società di Navigazione Aerea Itavia, with its operational base at Rome-Urbe airport. Operations began in July 1959 with a de Havilland DH.104 Dove, on a flight to Rimini, during the summer months. In 1960, two routes were added: Rome–Pecara and Siena–Genoa. Six de Havilland DH.114 Heron aircraft entered the fleet in the following year.

On 14 October 1960, a Heron flying from Rome to Genoa crashed causing the interruption of services, which resumed only in May 1962 under the new name Aerolinee Itavia and with a small fleet of four Douglas DC-3s. The company's base of operations was moved to Rome Ciampino Airport, and the network expanded to include the Rome–Forlì, Rome–Crotone, and Rome–Bari–Foggia routes.

By 1963 DC-3s started being replaced by Handley Page Dart Herald turboprops. In addition to regular connections, these aircraft also allowed the launch of a stable charter business. In spring Aldo Davanzali gained full control of the company and remained at its helm until the end. The Heralds remained in service until 1973.

In May 1969, a Fokker F28 was leased and operated the Bologna–Turin–Geneva and Milan–Basel routes. After satisfactory results, three were ordered, with deliveries beginning at the end of 1969.the year.

=== The 70s ===
The first of four Douglas DC-9-15s arrived at the end of 1971. After the retirement of the Heralds, by the mid-1970s Itavia had an entirely jet fleet, five DC 9s and seven F28s. In 1972, Itavia started operating from Milan Bergamo Airport, as an alternative to Milan-Linate: routes to Cagliari, Catania, and Rome were launched. In that same year, the registered office was moved to Catanzaro, in Calabria, to benefit from tax breaks and incentives provided for companies operating in the Southern Italy. The administrative headquarters and general management were relocated to Via Sicilia in Rome.

Itavia achieved a significant market share on domestic air routes. This activity was augmented during the high season by several European routes and significant charter flight activity. During these years, the company's workforce grew to over a thousand. The fleet was expanded to include DC-9 versions with greater capacity, for example the Douglas DC-9-30, and supplemented with leased aircraft.

=== The 80s marked the end ===
The airline's operations continued regularly without any significant incidents until 27 June 1980, when one of its DC-9s, operating Flight IH 870 from Bologna to Palermo, crashed under mysterious circumstances off the coast of Ustica island, in the lower Tyrrhenian Sea. All 81 people on board lost their lives. After the disaster, the airline was accused of poor maintenance standards and failure to comply with safety regulations, with structural collapse being the suspected cause of the disaster, a theory later ruled out by subsequent investigations and rulings. Even before the accident, Itavia was heavily in debt, with some of its aircraft mortgaged. The disaster simply accelerated the end of operations: scheduled flights were immediately suspended, and in January 1981, the Italian Transport Minister revoked the flight license (AOC). On 14 April 1981, the company was declared insolvent and on the following 31 July the Ministry of Industry, in agreement with the Ministry of the Treasury, placed the company into extraordinary administration: the fleet and flight personnel were rescued and absorbed by Aermediterranea (a company 55% owned by Alitalia and 45% by ATI - Aero Trasporti Italiani).

=== Legal disputes ===
On 31 March 1981 the company sued the Ministry of Defense, the Ministry of Transport, and the Ministry of the Interior for negligence alleging that the plane crash triggered the economic and financial crisis that led to the bankruptcy. According to Itavia, the Ministry of Defense and the Ministry of Transport failed to monitor, supervise, and ensure the safety of Italian airspace, while the Ministry of the Interior failed to prevent terrorism, spreading the idea of a bomb on board.

The Court of Rome ordered the defendant ministries to pay damages of €uros 108.07 million plus statutory interest (from 31 December 2000) and legal costs totaling €uros 943,740. On 13 March 2007, the First Civil Section of the Rome Court of Appeals, acquitted the ministries. On 11 February 2009, the Third Civil Section of the Court of Cassation (= supreme court) ordered the rehearing of the appeal proceedings.

In January 2013, in its first final civil judgment ordering compensation, the Court of Cassation confirmed that the disaster was caused by a missile and not an explosion inside the DC9. It therefore ordered the Italian State to compensate the victims' families for failing to ensure the safety of the airspace with adequate civilian and military radar monitoring. This was the first procedural finding after the criminal proceedings came to nothing.

However, since Itavia's innocence in the accident had been established in the civil proceedings (the hypothesis of structural failure was definitively dismissed), the ruling, and especially a page of the "Minority Report" of the members of the Stragi (= massacres) Commission, gave a less than favorable assessment of Itavia's financial and economic management. It was noted, however, that no judicial investigations had ever been opened into allegations of crime and/or civil liability against the air carrier and its directors.

On 22 October 2013, the Court of Cassation, upholding the appeal of Aldo Davanzali's heirs, declared the theory of a missile fired by an unknown aircraft "now established" in case law. A new civil trial was therefore necessary to assess the liability of the Ministries of Defense and Transport, as the misdirection of the investigation had been "definitively established." The version of the downing by a missile was reiterated in April 2015 by the Palermo Court and Prosecutor's office.

In May 2018, the Court of Cassation ruled that the Ministries of Infrastructure and Defense were required to compensate the former airline that went bankrupt. The main reason for the ruling was "Failure to monitor and supervise the complex and dangerous situation that arose in the skies above Ustica."

=== Aldo Davanzali legacy ===
In the years following the accident, Aldo Davanzali devoted all his resources to defending Itavia from accusations of poor aircraft maintenance. He died in May 2005, at the age of 83, suffering from Parkinson's disease and in dire financial straits. The industrialist left a profound mark in Ancona, his adopted city and the headquarter of many of his businesses. He is still remembered with affection and regret. His daughter attempted to establish a memorial dedicated to him and to involve several entrepreneurs in reconstituting a "successor" airline. None of this has yet happened.

== Fleet ==
Various aircraft types were operated by Itavia over the years:

Itavia Historical Fleet
Aircraft	Image	Total	Introduced	Retired	Refs
Cessna 402B Utiliner		1	1967	1983	Spare parts transport and Aldo Davanzali personal aircraft
de Havilland DH.104 Dove		1	1959	1960	
de Havilland DH.114 Heron		7	1959	1964	
Douglas C-47A Skytrain		2	1961	1962	
Douglas C-47B Skytrain		2	1961	1963	
Fokker F28-1000 Fellowship		14	1969	1984	
Handley Page HPR.7 Dart Herald		5	1963	1973	
McDonnell Douglas DC-9-15		5	1971	1983	
McDonnell Douglas DC-9-30		4	1972	1981	
McDonnell Douglas DC-9-51		1	1976	1977	Leased

== Incidents and accidents ==
- On 14 October 1960, Itavia Flight 115, a De Havilland 114 Heron 2 registered as I-AOMU, departed from Rome to Genoa, and crashed on mountain (Monte Capanne), in the Elba's Isle. All 11 passengers and crew on board died.
- On 30 March 1963, a DC-3, registered as I-TAVI operating as Flight 703 departed from Pescara to Rome, and crashed on Monte Serra Alta, a mountain in nearby Sora. All 8 passengers and crew on board died.
- On 4 November 1970, Itavia Handley Page Herald registration I-TIVE was damaged beyond repair (dbr) after crash landing at Rome Ciampino Airport whilst crew training. The aircraft was later used for spare parts.
- On 1 January 1974, a Fokker F28, registered as I-TIDE operating as Flight 897 departed from Bologna to Turin, and crashed on approach to Turin Airport. 38 of the 42 people on board died.
- On 9 April 1975, Itavia Fokker F28, registered as I-TIDA, was damaged beyond repair on take off at Milan Bergamo Airport after both engines failed and it was unable to stop within the remaining runway length. There were no fatalities.
- On 27 June 1980, Itavia Flight 870, a Douglas DC-9-15 flying from Bologna to Palermo crashed in the Tyrrhenian Sea for reasons unclear, killing all 81 people on board. An explosion caused by either a bomb on board or an air-to-air missile is considered the most likely explanation.

== See also ==
- List of defunct airlines of Italy
