= Aero Trasporti Italiani Flight 327 =

1972 aviation accident in Italy

- Aftermath of the accident

Accident
- Date: 30 October 1972
- Summary: Controlled flight into terrain due to pilot error
- Site: near Corato, Italy

Aircraft
- I-ATIR, the aircraft involved in accident, seen in May 1972
- Aircraft type: Fokker F27-200
- Operator: Aero Trasporti Italiani
- Registration: I-ATIR
- Flight origin: Naples International Airport, Naples, Italy
- Stopover: Bari Karol Wojtyła Airport, Bari, Italy
- Destination: Brindisi Airport, Brindisi, Italy
- Occupants: 27
- Passengers: 24
- Crew: 3
- Fatalities: 27
- Survivors: 0

Aero Trasporti Italiani Flight 327 was a domestic flight in Italy en routing Naples - Bari - Brindisi. On 30 October 1972, the Fokker F27-200 crashed into a farmhouse near Corato during the descend to Bari Karol Wojtyła Airport, killing all 24 passengers and 3 crew members on board.

It was considered to be the worst plane crash in the Apulia region.

== Background ==
=== Aircraft ===
The aircraft involved was a Fokker F27-200 manufactured in 1966 and registered as I-ATIR. By the time of the accident, it had accumulated 17,420 flight hours with 23,337 flights.

=== Occupants ===
The flight was carrying 24 passengers, including two off-duty flight attendants, alongside 3 crew members, which consisted of:

- Captain: Giuseppe Cardone
- Co-pilot: Bruno Cappellini
- Navigator: Antonio Di Bella
- Flight attendant: Bruno Malevolti
- Flight attendant: Mauro Parlapiano (Note: Some sources accounted the two flight attendants as crew members (5), while some didn't (3))

== Accident ==
The plane took off from Naples International Airport at 20:00 - delaying 20 minutes from schedule. The flight was normal until the landing phase when, 50 km from Bari Karol Wojtyła Airport, the captain transmitted that they saw the runway.At 20:40, the plane crashed into a farmhouse, owned by a family of three - not injured in the crash. No survivors were found of the 27 occupants.

== Investigation ==
The investigation concluded that the plane crash was likely due to pilot error as the weather at that time was fine and, at the scene, the altimeter was found to be indicating correctly. The pilot may have not descended in time and fly too low.

== Theories ==
There is a famous hypothesis suggested that the cause of the plane crash was due to the malfunction of the VHF by the existence of magnetic force.However, the experiement carried out by CICAP debunked it.

== Memorial ==
A dark cross was built between Corato and Poggiorsini, in provincial road 39.
