= Itavia Flight 115 =

1960 aviation accident in Italy

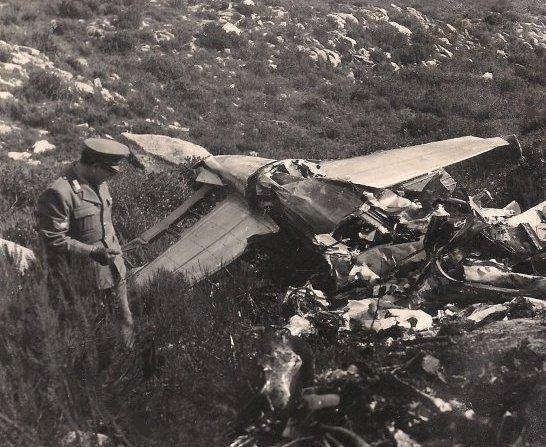
- Wreckage of the aircraft

Accident
- Date: 14 October 1960
- Summary: Controlled flight into terrain due to pilot error
- Site: La Tabella, Elba, Italy

Aircraft
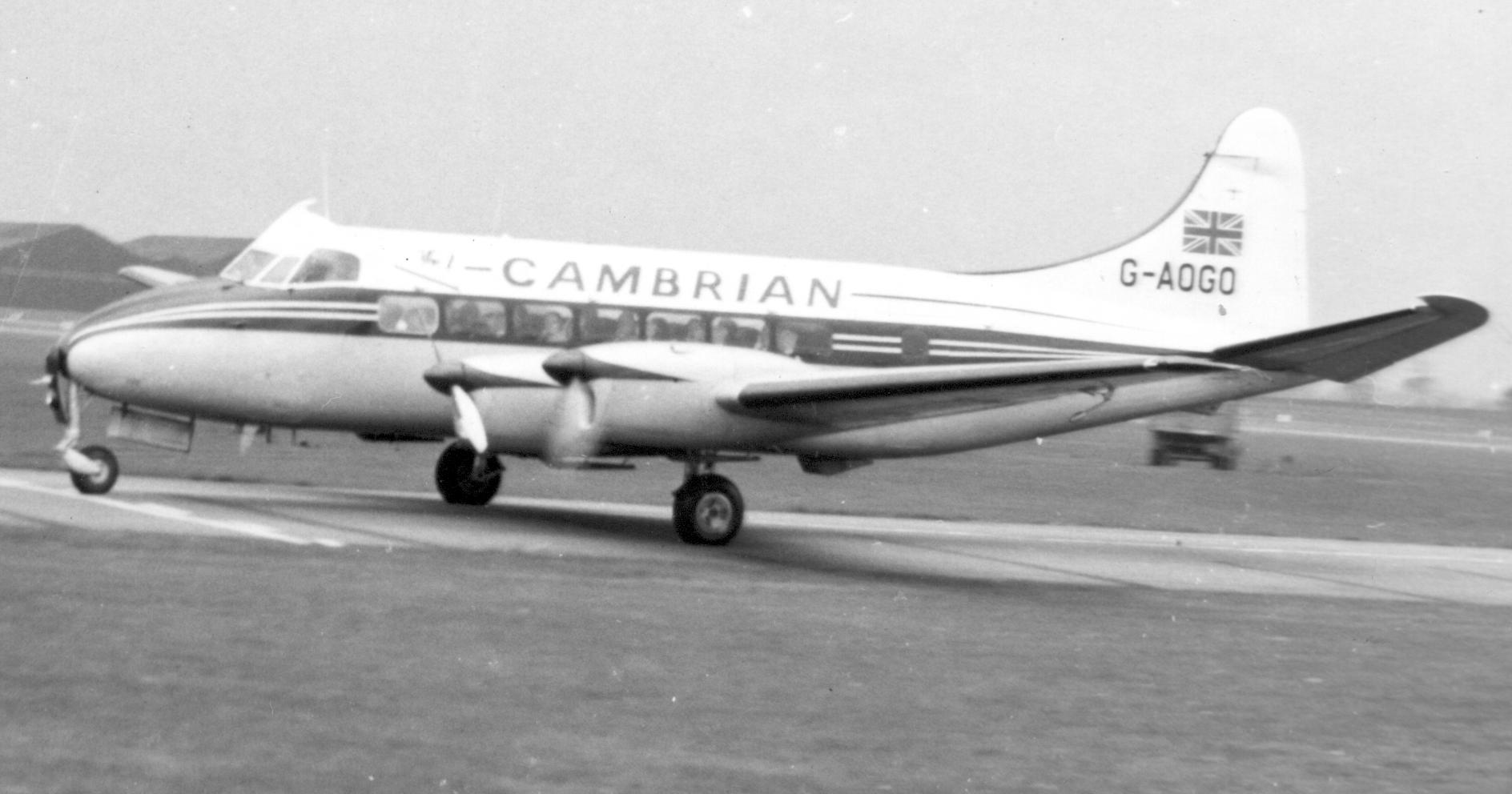
- A de Havilland Heron identical to the one involved
- Aircraft type: de Havilland DH-114 Heron 2
- Aircraft name: Città di Genova
- Operator: Itavia
- Registration: I-AOMU
- Flight origin: Rome Urbe Airport, Rome, Italy
- Destination: Genoa Airport, Genoa, Italy
- Occupants: 11
- Passengers: 7
- Crew: 4
- Fatalities: 11
- Survivors: 0

Itavia Flight 115 was a scheduled passenger flight from Rome to Genoa, Italy. On 14 October 1960, the aircraft operating the flight crashed into the slopes of Mount Capanne near the town of Elba at 728 meters (2,388 feet), killing all 7 passengers and 4 crew members.

== Aircraft and crew ==
The aircraft involved was an Itavia de Havilland DH-114 Heron 2, registration I-AOMU, manufactured in 1955. The flight crew consisted of captain Ennio Scipione, first officer Francesco Cossu, and two flight attendants, Giovanna Pertusio and Grazia Candeloro.

== Accident ==
The flight took off from Rome Urbe Airport at 15:02 pm local time. At 15:19, the crew contacted the tower in Genoa, stating that they were currently flying over the city of Civitavecchia. The controller, seeing the poor weather conditions along the flight's path, offered to divert them to either Turin or Nice. There was no response to this message from the crew. Moments later, the aircraft struck the slopes of Mount Capanne at 2,388 feet, exploding and breaking up on impact and killing all 11 occupants onboard.

== Investigation ==
The investigation found that the crew was flying according to visual flight rules instead of instrument flight rules, which was required given the poor visibility on the flight's route. Why the crew chose to fly in VFR instead of IMC is unknown. It was also found that the airline had allowed the unqualified captain to fly the plane.

== Lawsuit ==
A court case followed the accident, with penal charges brought forward against the flight company, and responsible personnel of Civilavia and the Urbe airport. Among them were General Romolo Abbriata (director of the civil aviation authority), Luigi Petragnani (manager of Itavia), Renato Panini (technical organizer of Itavia) and Riccardo Rubbiano-Pivawere. However, at the third trial, they were acquitted of all charges in both instances (1965/66).

== Memorial ==
On October 13, 2013, on the evening preceding the 53rd anniversary of the accident, a monument was built on the accident site.

== External sources ==
- Il disastro aereo del 1960 by Silvestre Ferruzzi
- DISASTRO AEREO «ITAVIA» DELL'ISOLA D'ELBA (1960) on YouTube
