= Ustica =

- Comune
- Comune di Ustica
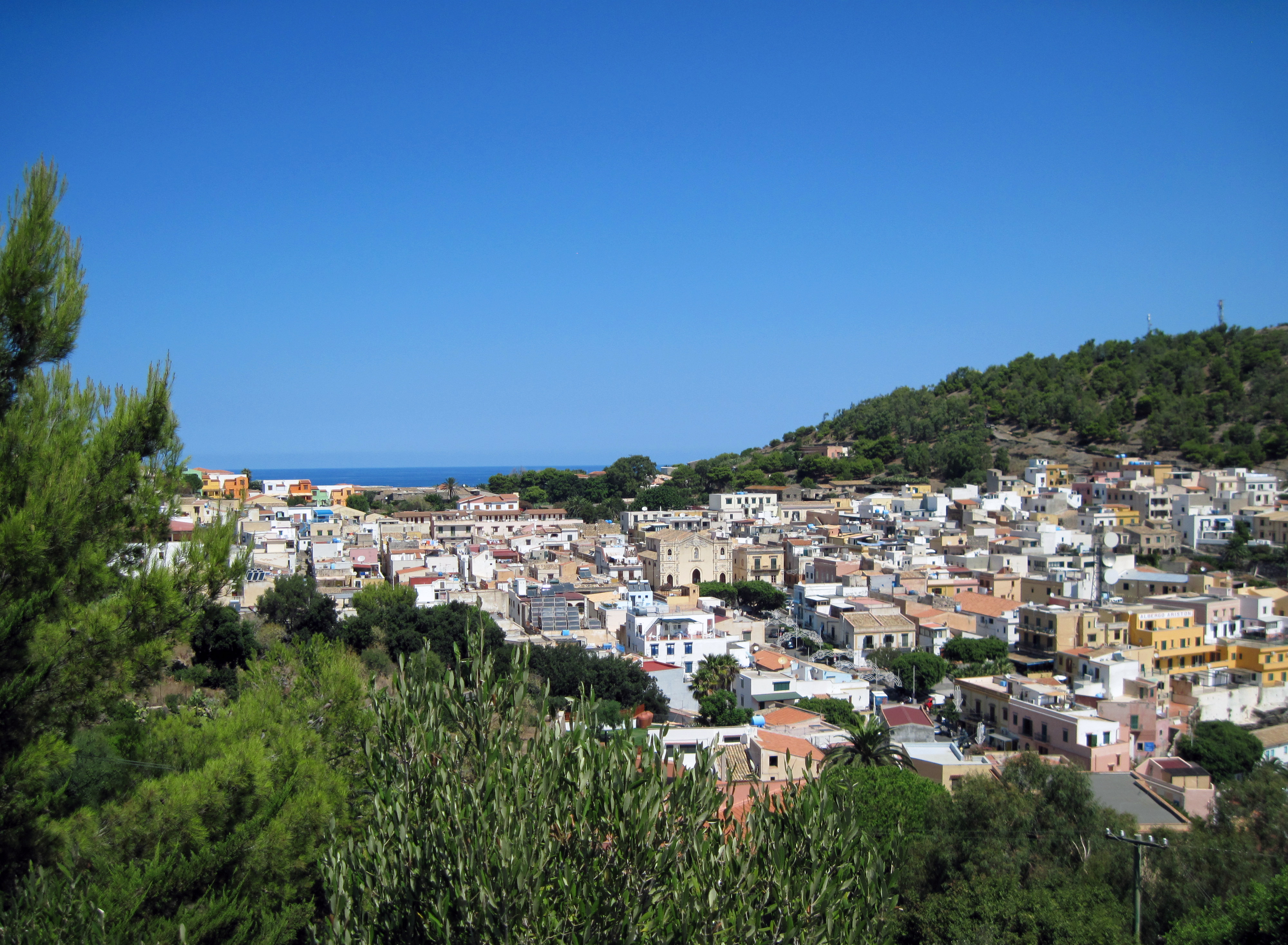
- View of the town of Ustica

- Location within Italy Location within Sicily
- Coordinates: 38°42′19″N 13°10′34″E
- Country: Italy
- Region: Sicily
- Metropolitan city: Palermo (PA)

Government
  - Mayor: Aldo Messina

Area
  - Total: 8.24 km^{2} (3.18 sq mi)
- Elevation: 49 m (161 ft)

Population (2026)
  - Total: 1,323
  - Density: 161/km^{2} (416/sq mi)
- Demonym: Usticesi/Usticani
- Time zone: UTC+1 (CET)
  - Summer (DST): UTC+2 (CEST)
- Postal code: 90010
- Dialing code: 091

Ustica (Italian pronunciation: [ˈustika]; Sicilian: Ùstica) is a small island in the Tyrrhenian Sea, administratively part of the comune (municipality) of the same name in the Metropolitan City of Palermo in the autonomous island region of Sicily in southern Italy. It is about 5 kilometres (3 mi) across and is situated 52 kilometres (32 mi) north of Capo Gallo in the city of Palermo. It has 1,323 inhabitants.

There is a regular ferry service from the island to Palermo in Sicily.

== History ==
=== Late Bronze Age ===
Excavations begun in 1989 at Tramontana, also known as Faraglioni, have unearthed what was a large prehistoric village dating from the 14th to the 13th century BC. The foundations of some 300 stone-built houses were discovered, and the defensive walls of the settlement are among the strongest fortifications of any period known in Italy. It is believed that these early settlers came over from the Aeolian Islands.

Ustica contains the remains of the Bronze Age settlement of Villaggio dei Faraglioni. It showcases organized urban planning with huts and narrow roadways along its northern periphery, representing a well-preserved example of ancient Mediterranean civilization between 1400 and 1200 BC. Recent archaeological investigations unveiled a sophisticated fortification system beneath the village. Using non-invasive techniques such as ground-penetrating radar and electrical resistivity tomography, researchers identified an 820-foot-long arc-shaped stone wall, standing 13 to 16 feet tall.

In historic times, the island has been populated at least since about 1500 BC by Phoenician peoples.

=== Classical Age ===
The island named Osteodes (Ὀστεώδης; meaning "Bone Island" in Greek) because, during the wars between Carthage and Syracuse, about six thousand unpaid mercenaries rebelled against their Carthaginian commanders, threatened violence over delayed wages, and caused such unrest that the Carthaginian senate secretly ordered the generals to eliminate them, the commanders then deceived the mercenaries by placing them on ships under the pretense of a military mission, abandoned them on the isolated island without food or means of escape and left them to die of starvation, after which the island was said to have become covered with their bones.

Both Pliny the Elder and Ptolemy treated Ustica (Οὐστίκα) and Osteodes as two different islands, but they were actually the same island, originally called Osteodes by the Greeks and later known to the Romans as Ustica, with the change in names causing later geographers to mistakenly identify them as separate places. The Romans renamed the island Ustica, Latin for burnt, for its black rocks. The island is also known locally as the "black pearl".

=== Middle Ages ===
In the 6th century, a Benedictine community settled in the island, but was soon forced to move because of ongoing wars between Europeans and Arabs. Attempts to colonize the island in the Middle Ages failed because of raids by Barbary pirates.

=== Modern Era ===
In the mid-18th century, the island was settled by approximately 90 people from the island of Lipari, an island also located north of Sicily, but east of Ustica. They brought with them the patron saint of Lipari, Bartholomew the Apostle, who became the patron saint of Ustica as well. In the mid-to-late 19th century and early 20th century, as the population of the island grew too large, hundreds of Ustican families emigrated to the United States. Many of these families settled in New Orleans and surrounding areas, where there are today thousands of descendants whose ties remain strong to Ustica. Among them was Angelina Caravella, the mother of famous jazz singer and trumpet player Louis Prima. A smaller number of families settled in San Jose and San Francisco, in New York, Massachusetts, Oregon, Montana and in Chicago.

==== Fascist prison island ====
During the Fascist years in Italy and until the 1950s, Ustica was used as an island prison. Benito Mussolini banished thousands of political opponents to Ustica, often as many as 1,500 at a time. Both Antonio Gramsci and Amadeo Bordiga were sent there. In the early 1940s Yugoslav war prisoners were crammed onto the island, and many of them died from malnutrition and tuberculosis. In the 1950s they were followed by suspected Mafiosi expelled from Sicily.

==== Ustica Massacre ====
On 27 June 1980, Itavia Flight 870 crashed into the sea off the island while en route to Palermo, killing all 81 people on board. The event became known as the Ustica massacre.

== Environment ==
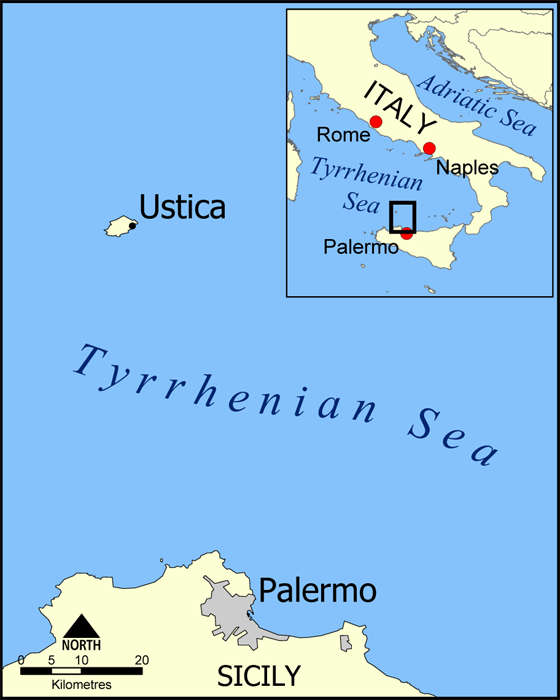
Location of Ustica in the Tyrrhenian Sea.

The island has limited sources of water, and vegetation is consequently scarce. The coast has numerous rocks and grottoes.

Ustica is home to the honeybee Apis mellifera sicula.

== Climate ==
Ustica's climate is classified as hot-summer mediterranean climate (Köppen: Csa). The annual average temperature is 18.13 °C (64.6 °F), the hottest month in July is 26.58 °C (79.8 °F), and the coldest month is 11.27 °C (52.3 °F) in February. The annual precipitation is 525.72 millimetres (20.70 in), of which October is the wettest with 78.85 millimetres (3.10 in), while July is the driest with only 3.91 millimetres (0.15 in).

Climate data for Ustica, elevation: 250 m or 820 ft, 1991-2020 normals, extremes 1946–present
Month	Jan	Feb	Mar	Apr	May	Jun	Jul	Aug	Sep	Oct	Nov	Dec	Year
Record high °C (°F)	22.4 (72.3)	23.0 (73.4)	26.0 (78.8)	27.2 (81.0)	33.2 (91.8)	37.6 (99.7)	43.0 (109.4)	39.0 (102.2)	36.8 (98.2)	32.2 (90.0)	27.6 (81.7)	22.8 (73.0)	43.0 (109.4)
Mean daily maximum °C (°F)	13.9 (57.0)	13.7 (56.7)	15.5 (59.9)	17.8 (64.0)	21.7 (71.1)	26.1 (79.0)	29.4 (84.9)	30.3 (86.5)	26.7 (80.1)	23.0 (73.4)	18.8 (65.8)	15.3 (59.5)	21.0 (69.8)
Daily mean °C (°F)	11.7 (53.1)	11.3 (52.3)	12.8 (55.0)	14.9 (58.8)	18.5 (65.3)	22.6 (72.7)	25.8 (78.4)	26.6 (79.9)	23.6 (74.5)	20.4 (68.7)	16.4 (61.5)	13.1 (55.6)	18.1 (64.6)
Mean daily minimum °C (°F)	9.5 (49.1)	8.8 (47.8)	10.2 (50.4)	12.0 (53.6)	15.3 (59.5)	19.1 (66.4)	22.1 (71.8)	23.0 (73.4)	20.5 (68.9)	17.7 (63.9)	14.0 (57.2)	10.9 (51.6)	15.3 (59.5)
Record low °C (°F)	−1.2 (29.8)	0.5 (32.9)	−1.2 (29.8)	3.6 (38.5)	6.4 (43.5)	10.0 (50.0)	14.0 (57.2)	14.2 (57.6)	12.2 (54.0)	7.6 (45.7)	3.0 (37.4)	−1.0 (30.2)	−1.2 (29.8)
Average precipitation mm (inches)	60.4 (2.38)	52.9 (2.08)	39.2 (1.54)	34.0 (1.34)	18.5 (0.73)	11.6 (0.46)	3.9 (0.15)	20.8 (0.82)	60.7 (2.39)	78.9 (3.11)	72.5 (2.85)	72.3 (2.85)	525.7 (20.70)
Average precipitation days (≥ 1.0 mm)	8.7	7.6	6.3	5.3	3.2	1.5	0.7	1.8	5.2	7.4	9.4	10.0	67.1
Average relative humidity (%)	79.0	77.5	77.5	76.6	74.7	73.5	73.0	73.6	76.5	78.4	77.3	77.8	76.3
Average dew point °C (°F)	7.7 (45.9)	7.0 (44.6)	8.4 (47.1)	10.1 (50.2)	13.2 (55.8)	16.5 (61.7)	19.4 (66.9)	20.5 (68.9)	18.1 (64.6)	15.5 (59.9)	11.6 (52.9)	8.4 (47.1)	13.0 (55.5)
Mean monthly sunshine hours	145.4	163.8	213.9	232.8	292.3	308.1	347.2	320.5	243.3	203.1	152.7	135.2	2,758.3
Source 1: NOAA, (dew point 1981-2010)
Source 2: Temperature estreme in Toscana

== Demographics ==
As of 2026, the population is 1,323, of which 50.9% are male, and 49.1% are female. Minors make up 12.8% of the population, and seniors make up 30.2%.

Historical population

Year	Pop.	±%
1861	2,382	—
1871	1,530	−35.8%
1881	1,793	+17.2%
1901	1,916	+6.9%
1911	1,576	−17.7%
1921	1,195	−24.2%
1931	1,050	−12.1%
1936	1,141	+8.7%

Year	Pop.	±%
1951	1,249	+9.5%
1961	1,262	+1.0%
1971	1,086	−13.9%
1981	1,150	+5.9%
1991	1,188	+3.3%
2001	1,335	+12.4%
2011	1,287	−3.6%
2021	1,307	+1.6%

Source: ISTAT

=== Immigration ===
As of 2025, immigrants make up 4.4% of the population. The 5 largest foreign countries of birth are Romania, Poland, Tunisia, Germany, and India.

== Tourism ==
Ustica is particularly known for scuba diving, with a number of diving schools established on the island. Recreational divers are attracted by the relatively deep dives, which are a feature of the island's volcanic geology.

== Gallery ==
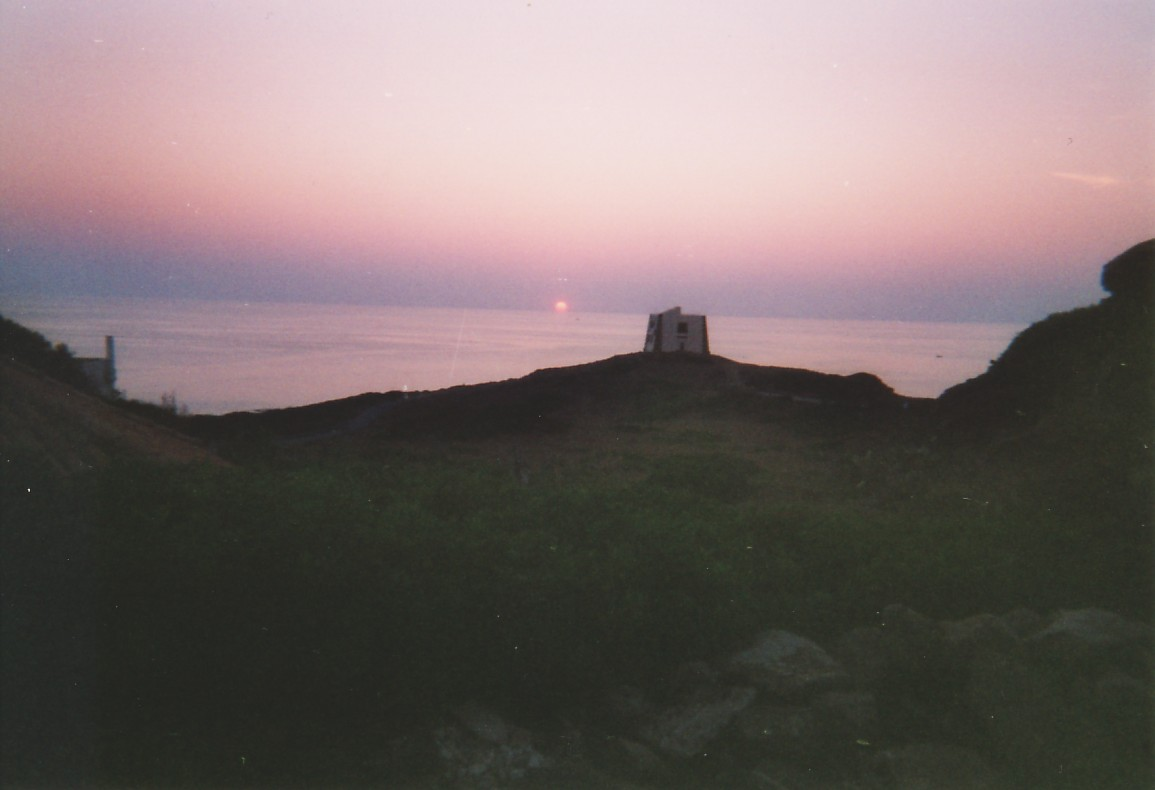
An image of Ustica at sunset

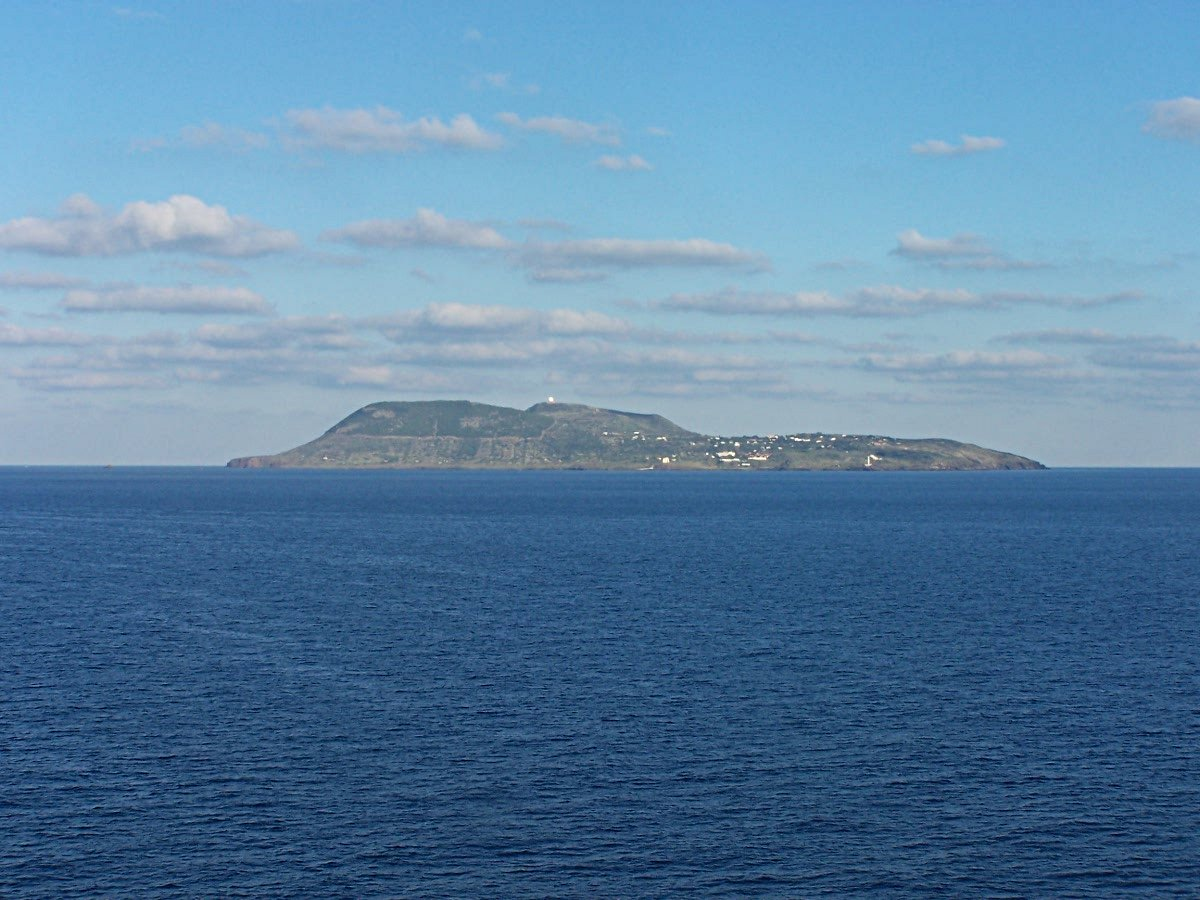
Ustica seen from the ferryboat

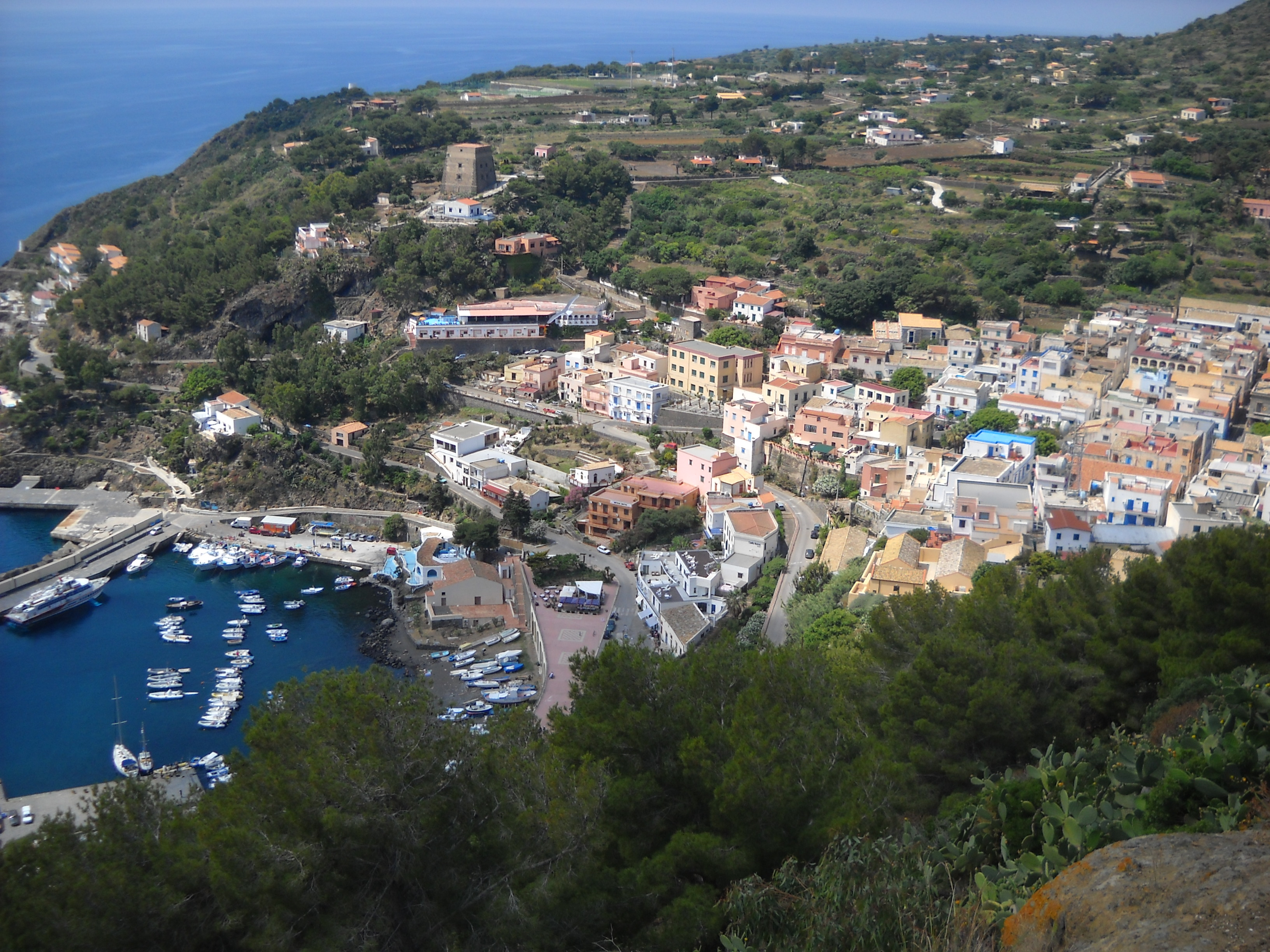
A panorama of the Ustica harbour

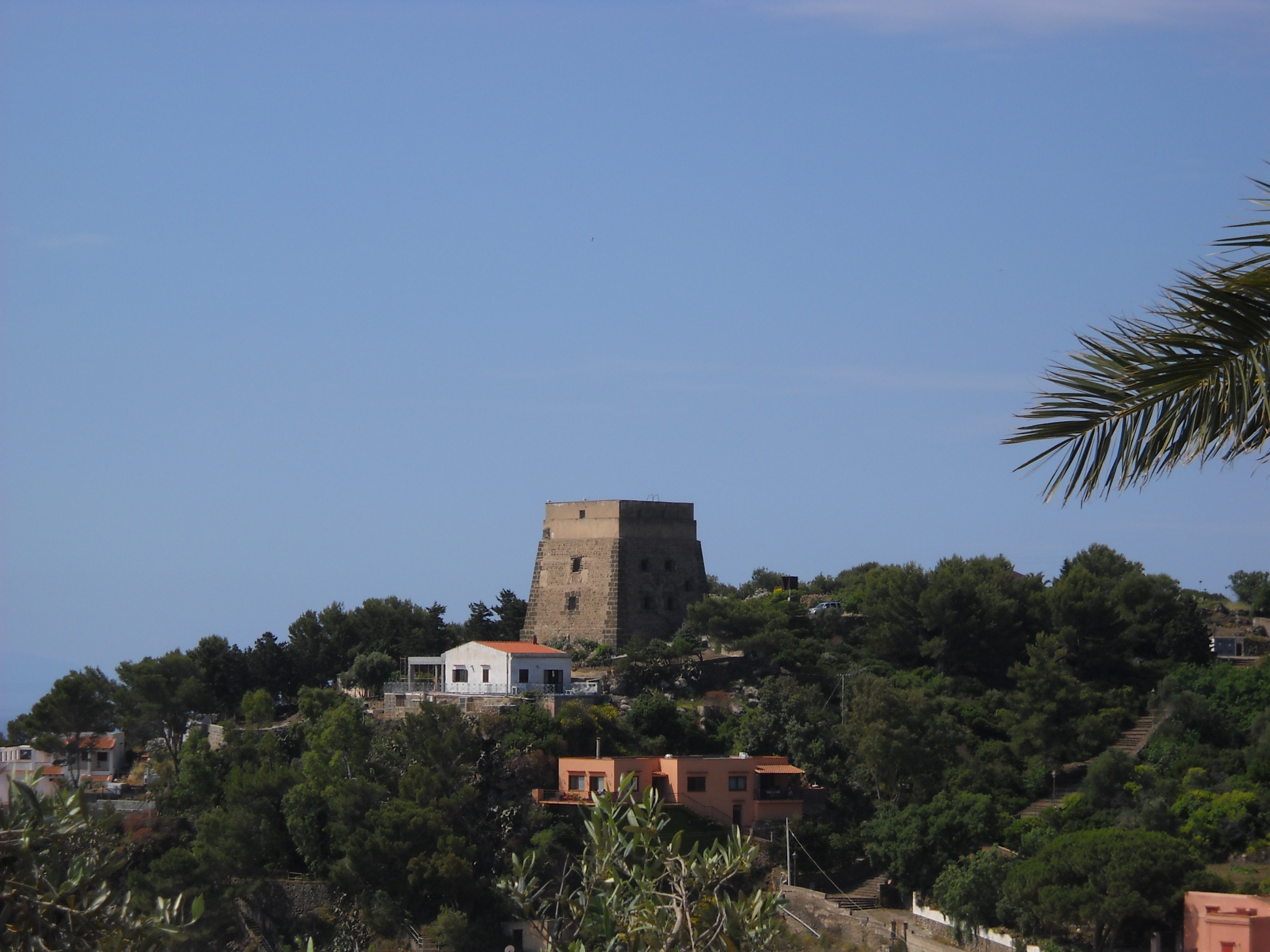
Santa Maria Tower near the Ustica harbour

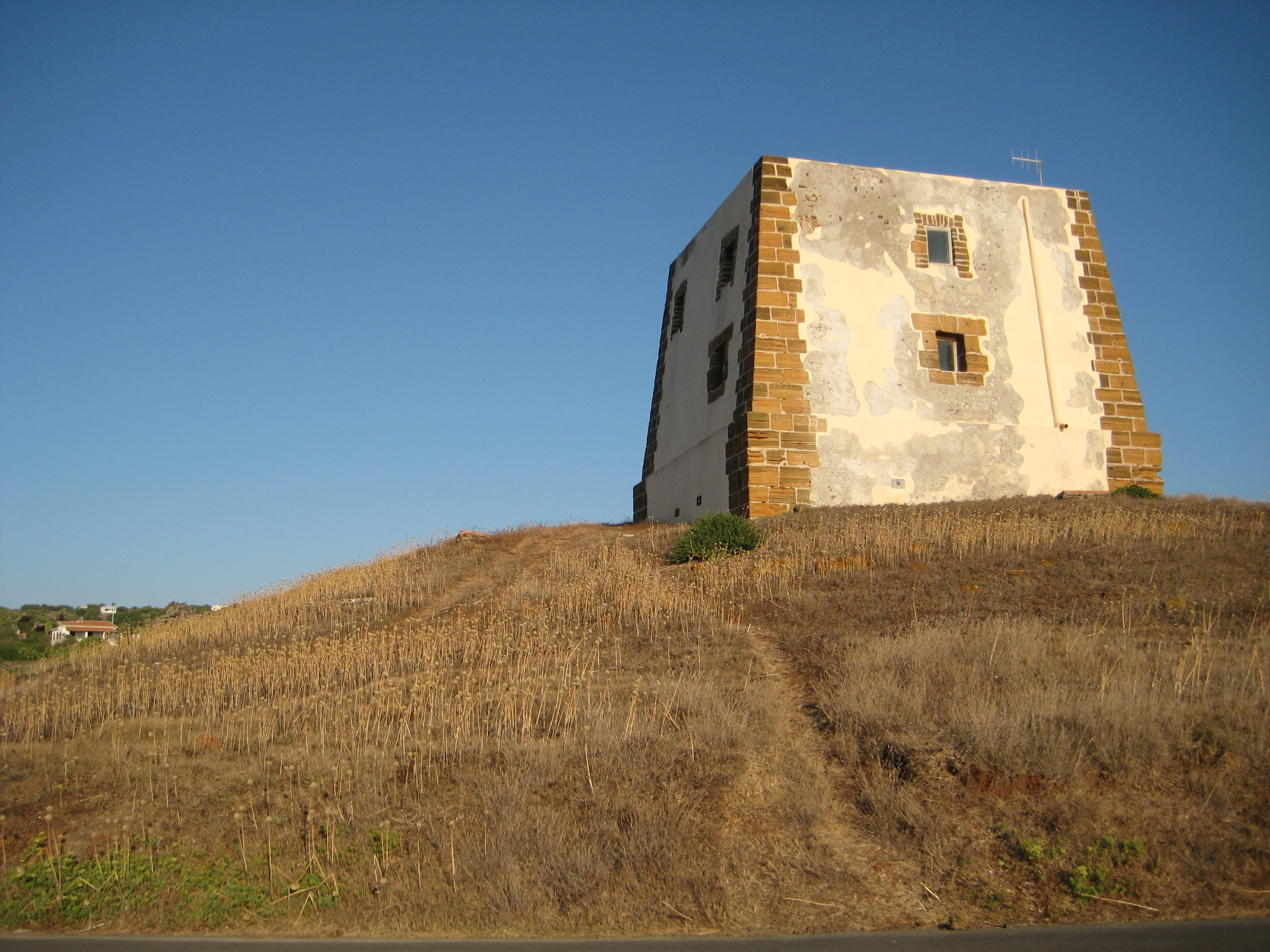
Tower of the Spalmatore – Ustica

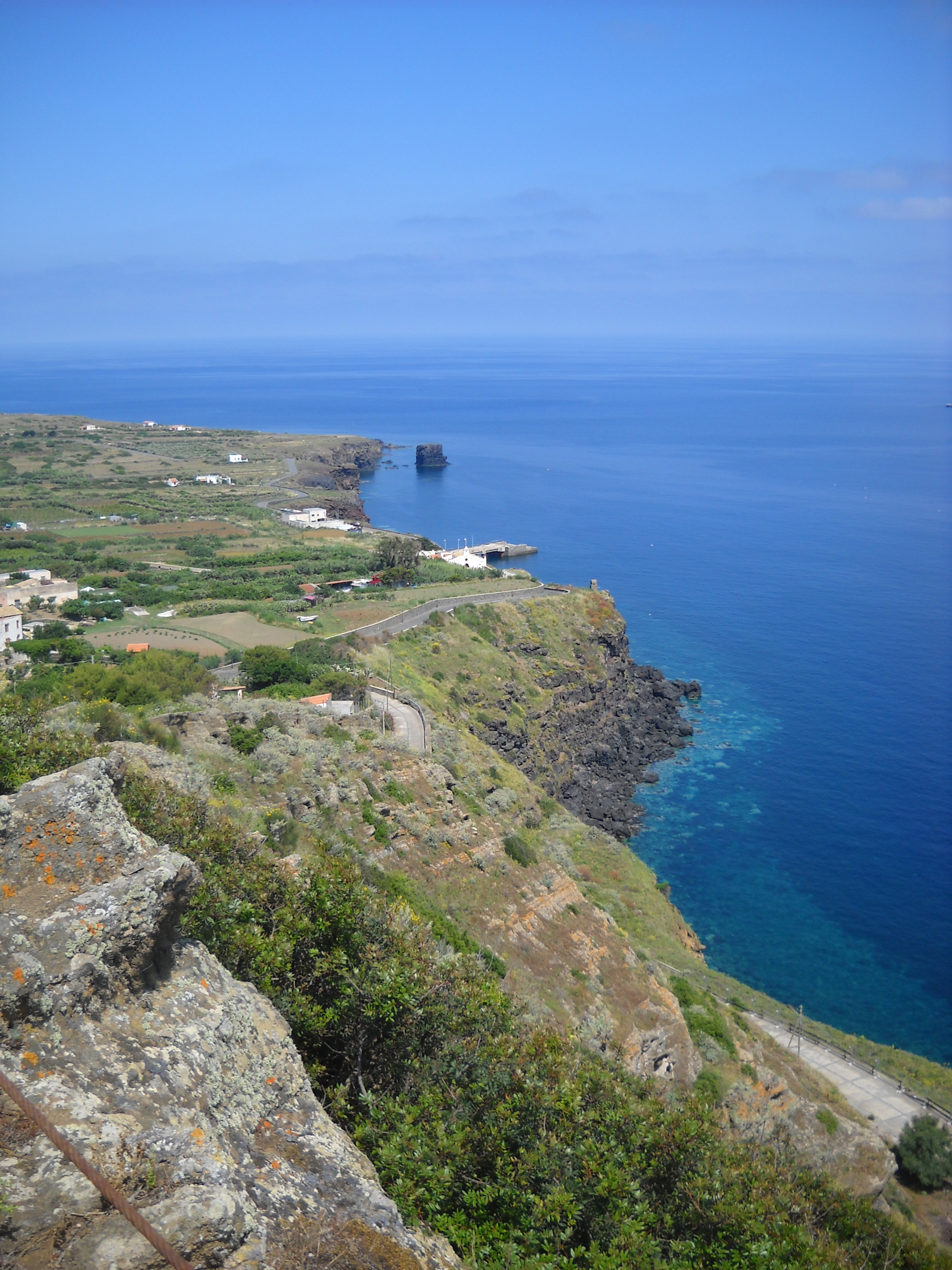
The northern coast of Ustica

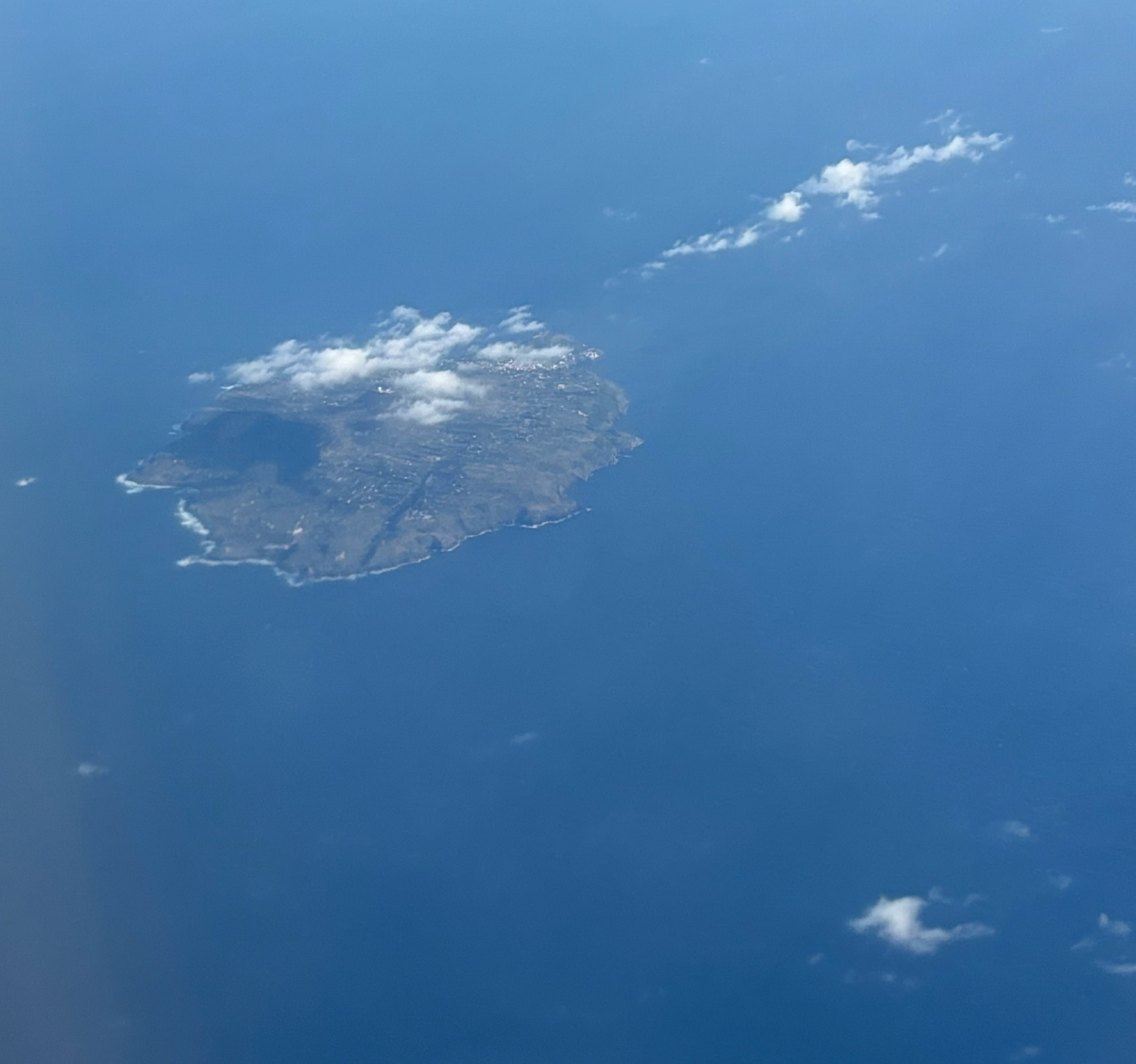
Aerial view of Ustica

== See also ==
- List of islands of Italy
