= Aero Trasporti Italiani Flight 12 =

1979 plane crash in Italy

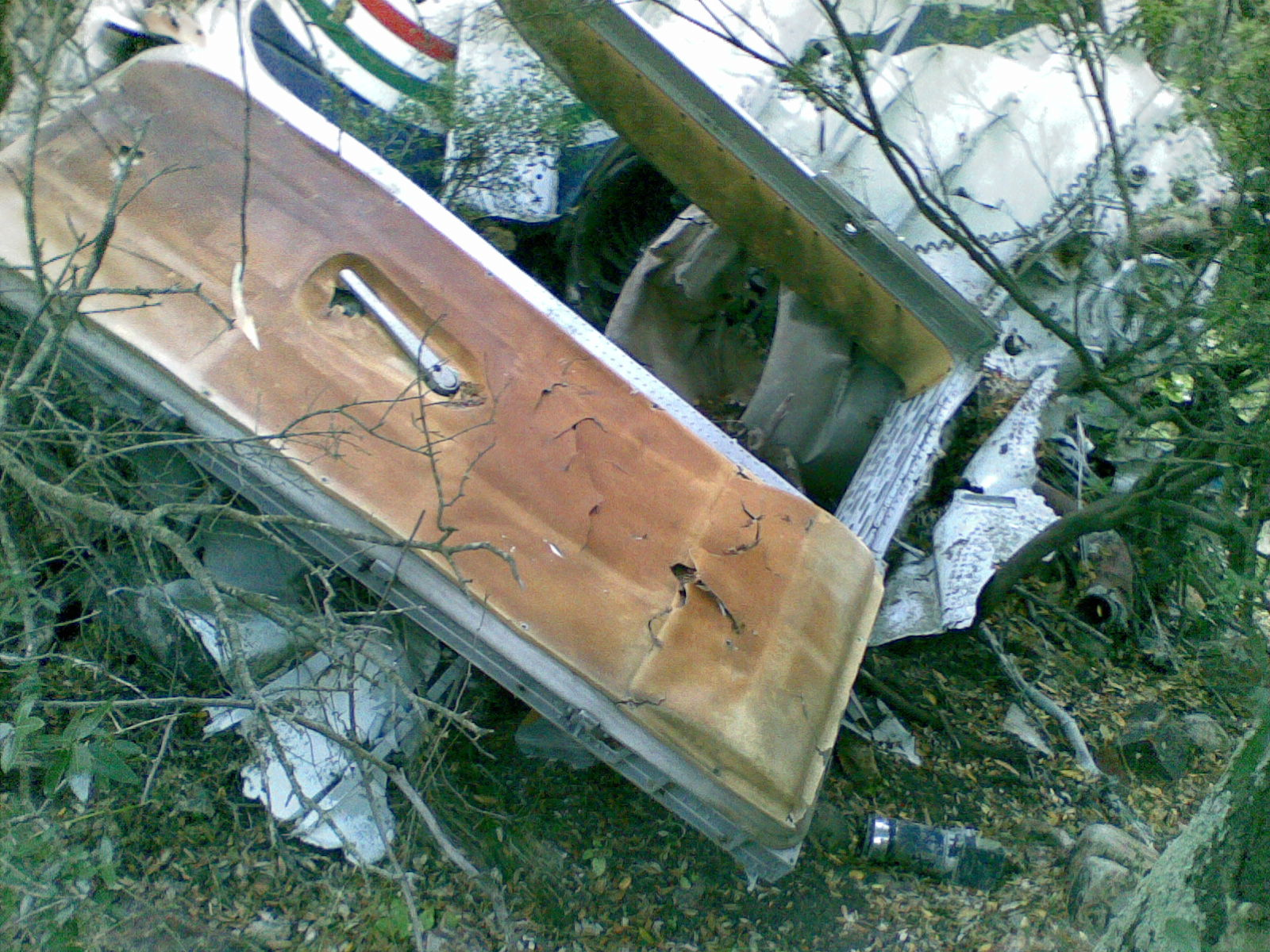
- The wreckage of the aircraft

Accident
- Date: 14 September 1979
- Summary: Controlled flight into terrain
- Site: Near Sarroch, Italy; 39°06′19″N 8°57′34″E

Aircraft
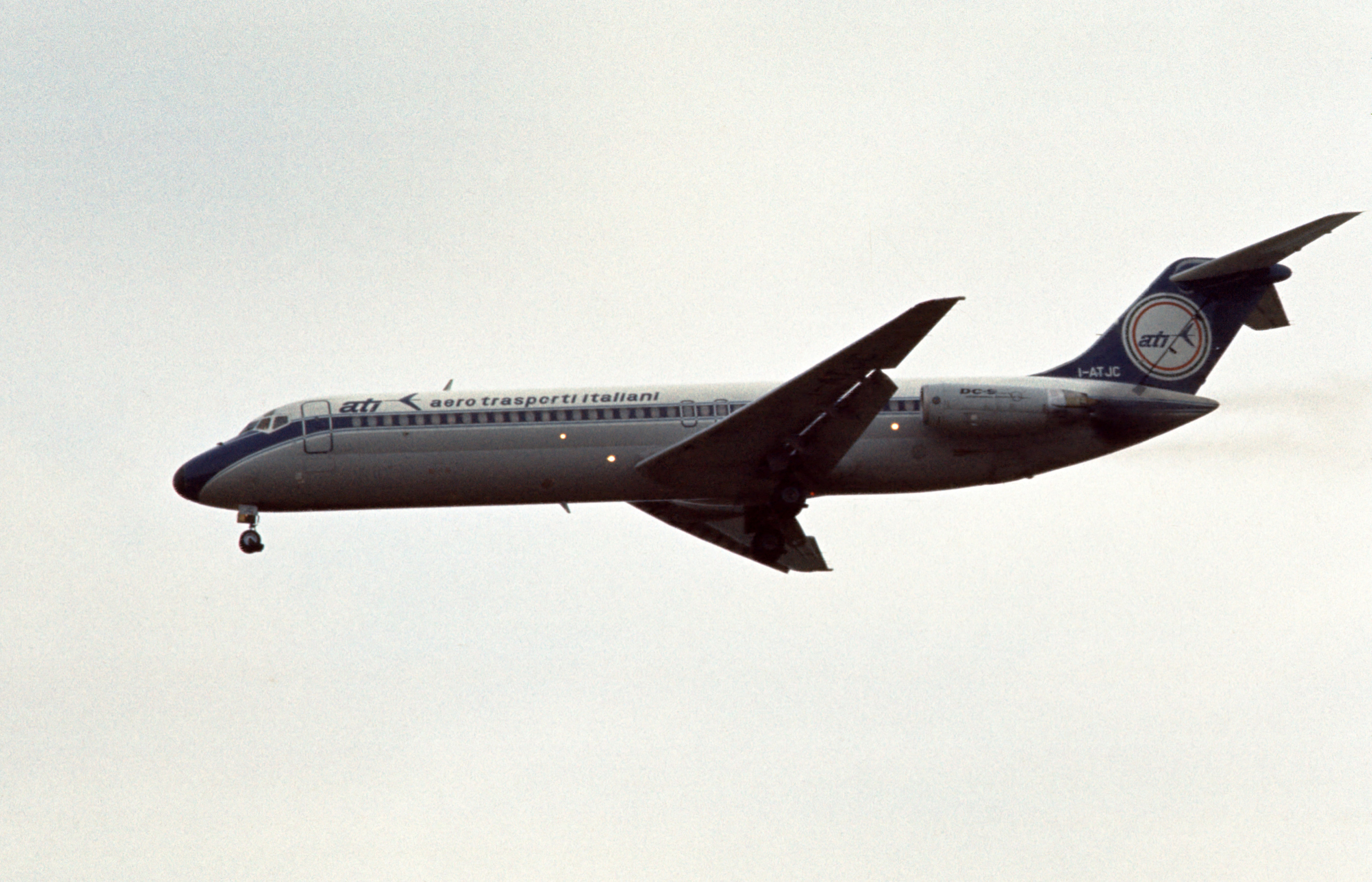
- I-ATJC, the aircraft involved in the accident, photographed in 1977
- Aircraft type: McDonnell Douglas DC-9-32
- Operator: Aero Trasporti Italiani
- IATA flight No.: BM12
- ICAO flight No.: ATI12
- Call sign: ATI 12
- Registration: I-ATJC
- Flight origin: Alghero-Fertilia Airport
- Stopover: Cagliari-Elmas Airport
- Destination: Rome Fiumicino Airport
- Occupants: 31
- Passengers: 27
- Crew: 4
- Fatalities: 31
- Survivors: 0

Aero Trasporti Italiani Flight 12 was a scheduled flight from Alghero-Fertilia Airport in northwest Sardinia to Rome Fiumicino Airport with a scheduled stop at Cagliari-Elmas Airport in southern Sardinia. On September 14, 1979, the Douglas DC-9 operating the flight struck a rocky mountainside during an attempted landing at Cagliari, resulting in the deaths of all 31 passengers and crew on board. The crash was caused by misinterpreting ATC instructions leading to the flight colliding with terrain.

== Aircraft ==
The plane was a McDonnell Douglas DC-9, built in 1975 and delivered new to Aero Trasporti Italiani registered as I-ATJC. The aircraft had logged about 10000 hours at the time of the crash.

== Flight ==
The first officer contacted the controller at Cagliari at 00:23, asking for a weather report. The controller replied that runway 14 was in use, the wind was from 190° at 8 knots, and visibility was 7 km (4.3 mi). He also stated there were thunderstorms without precipitation, south-east and south-west of the airport. After contacting the Cagliari Tower controller at 00:26, the flight was cleared to descend to the transition altitude of 6,000 ft (1,800 m).

Having in front of them a consistent formation of cumulonimbus clouds, the first officer radioed their intention to make a 360° turn to further lower the altitude and thus avoid the cloud formations. The controller, not having traffic in the area, authorized the manoeuvre, and the first officer then announced the intention to leave 7,500 ft (2,300 m) for 3,000 ft (910 m). The controller then asked the flight if they had visual contact with the ground, but this was not the case. The clearance was amended to go down to 6000 feet instead of 3000 feet.

At 00:30 the flight reported that it was in visual contact with the ground, and that it was about to leave 6000 ft for 3000 ft. The controller confirmed this, adding that it had started to rain at the airport in the meantime. The aircraft however did not complete the planned 360° turn, thus finding itself with a different heading than initially planned. After reaching 3000 feet, the flight was cleared for the approach. The first officer confirmed this and announced that they would start the final approach with a slight deviation to the right of the beacon.

At 00:34 the first officer asked the controller to confirm that the ILS system was inoperative, which it was. At this stage of the flight the crew became unaware of their position. The captain believed he was flying over the sea, further south than the actual position of the aircraft, while the first officer rightly believed he was flying over the mountainous terrain of southern Sardinia. In the last minute and a half of the flight, the captain asked the first officer to lower the undercarriage and continued the descent. At an altitude of 2000 feet (610 m) the DC-9 hit the rocky mountainside of Conca d'Oru with the lower part of the fuselage, causing the aircraft to break up. A fire erupted. The point of impact was 18 km (11 mi) south-west of the airport.
