= Aero Trasporti Italiani =

Airline of Italy (1963–1994)

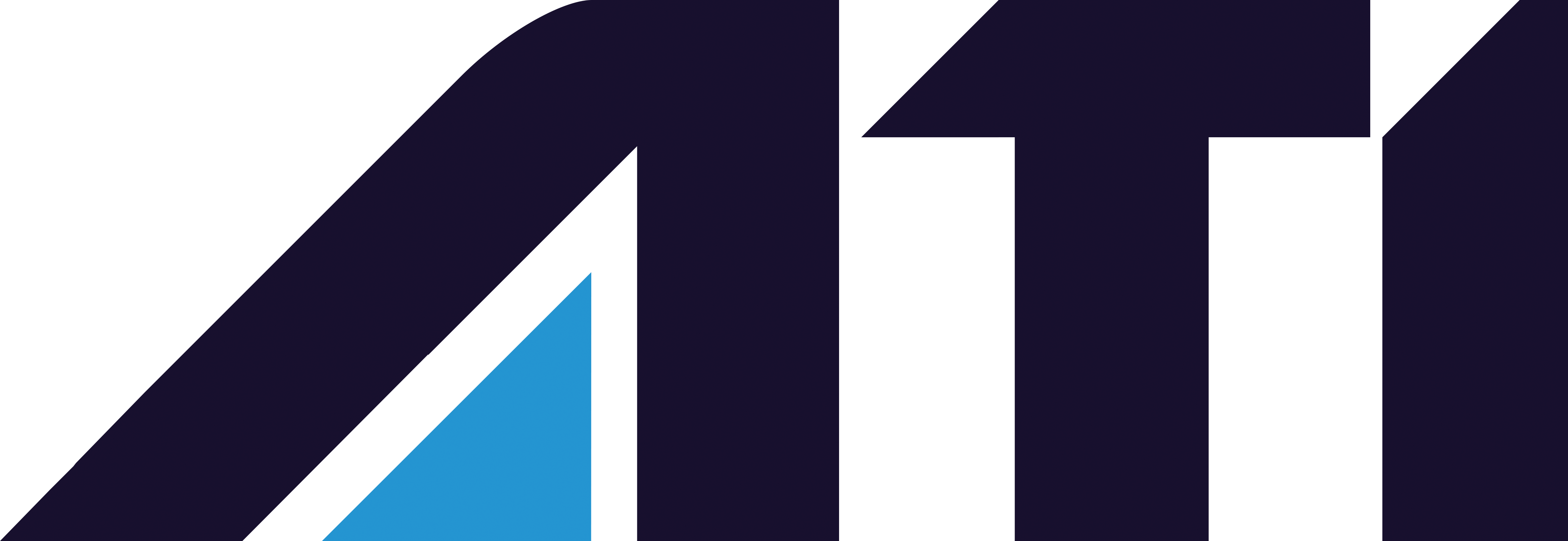

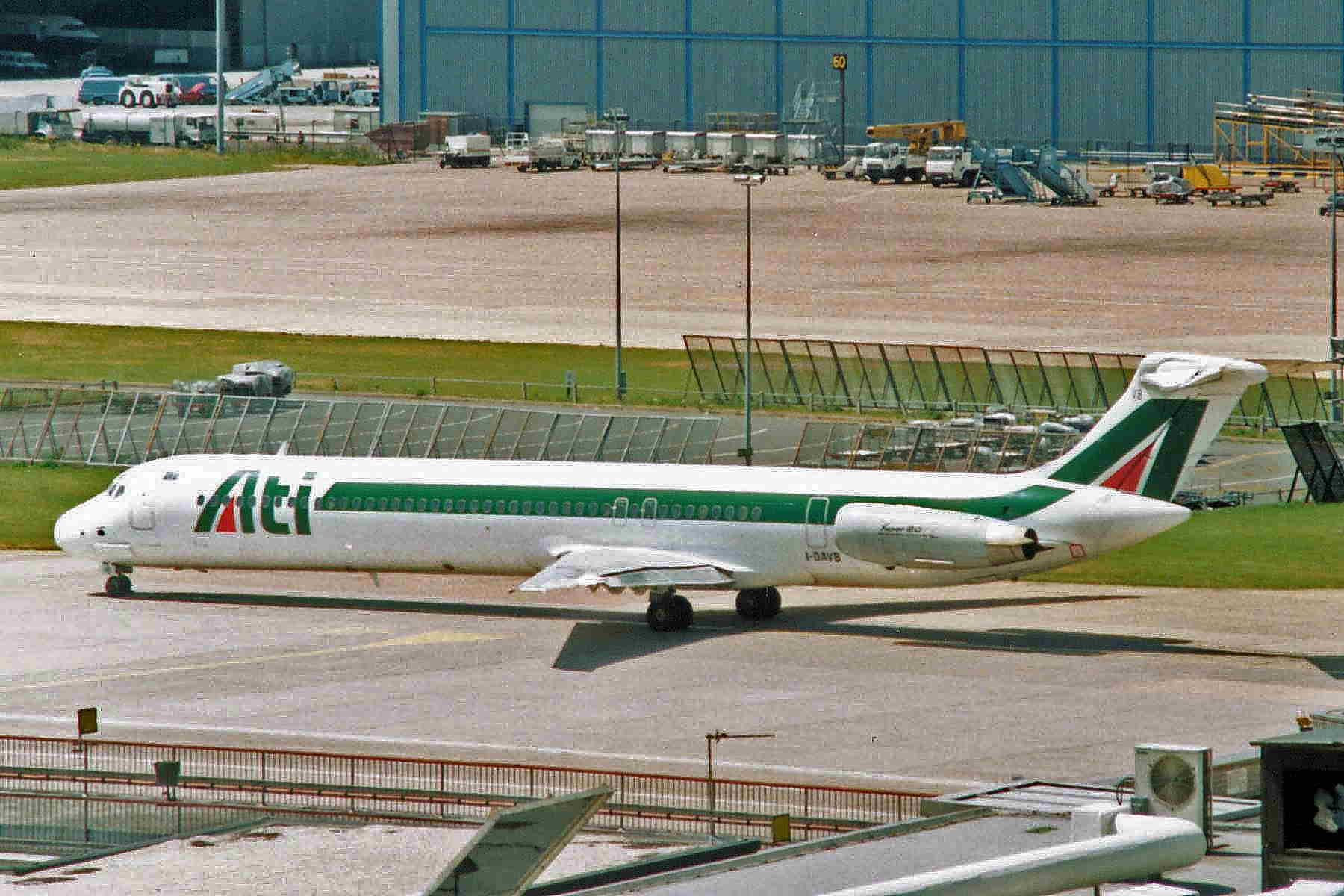
- McDonnell Douglas MD-82
IATA	ICAO	Call sign
BM	ATI	ATI
- Founded: 16 December 1963
- Commenced operations: 2 June 1964
- Ceased operations: 30 October 1994 (re-integrated into Alitalia)
- Operating bases: Naples International Airport
- Frequent-flyer program: MilleMiglia
- Fleet size: 34
- Parent company: Alitalia
- Headquarters: Naples, Italy
- Employees: 2,900 (1994)

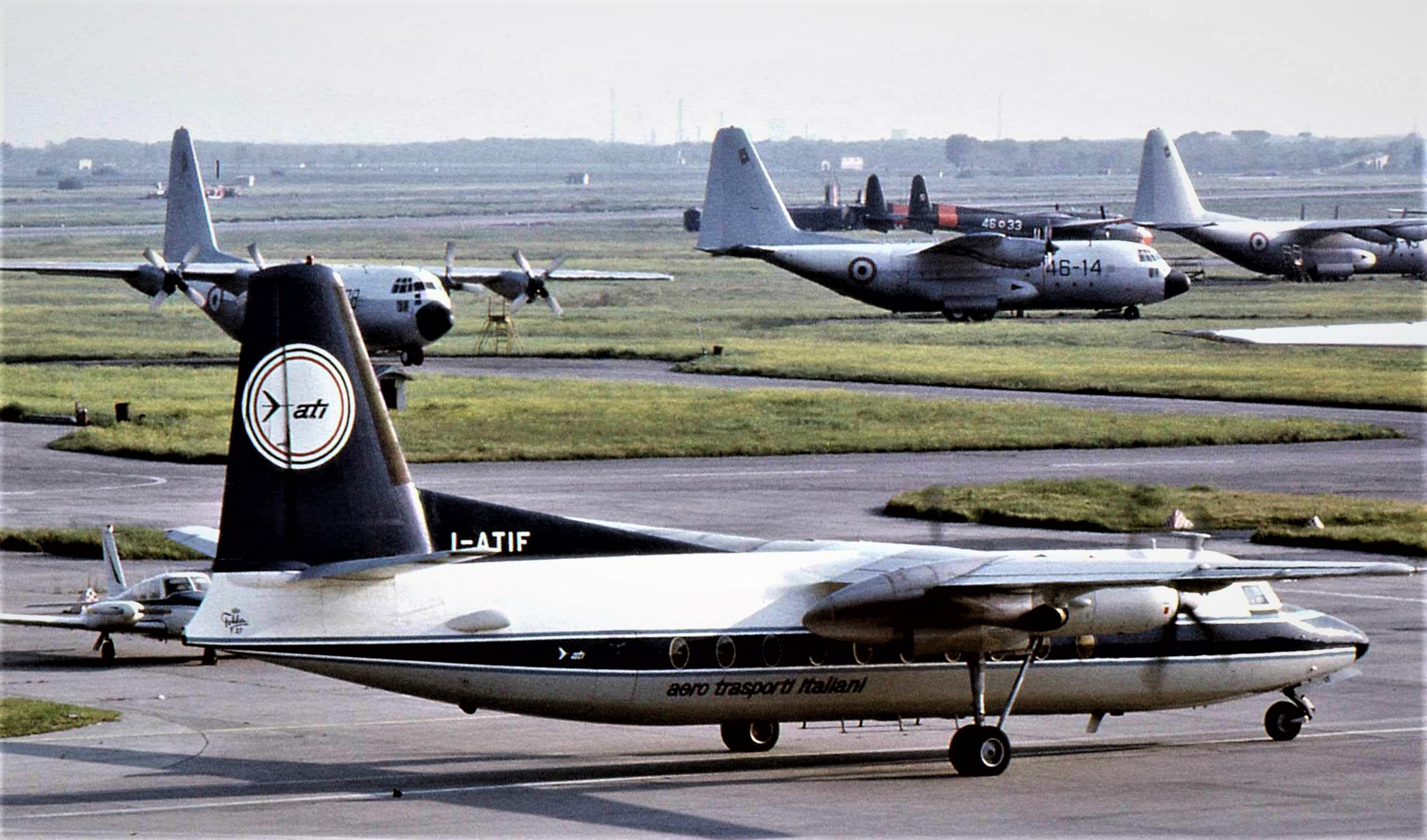
The Fokker F-27 "Friendship" was the airline's first aircraft.

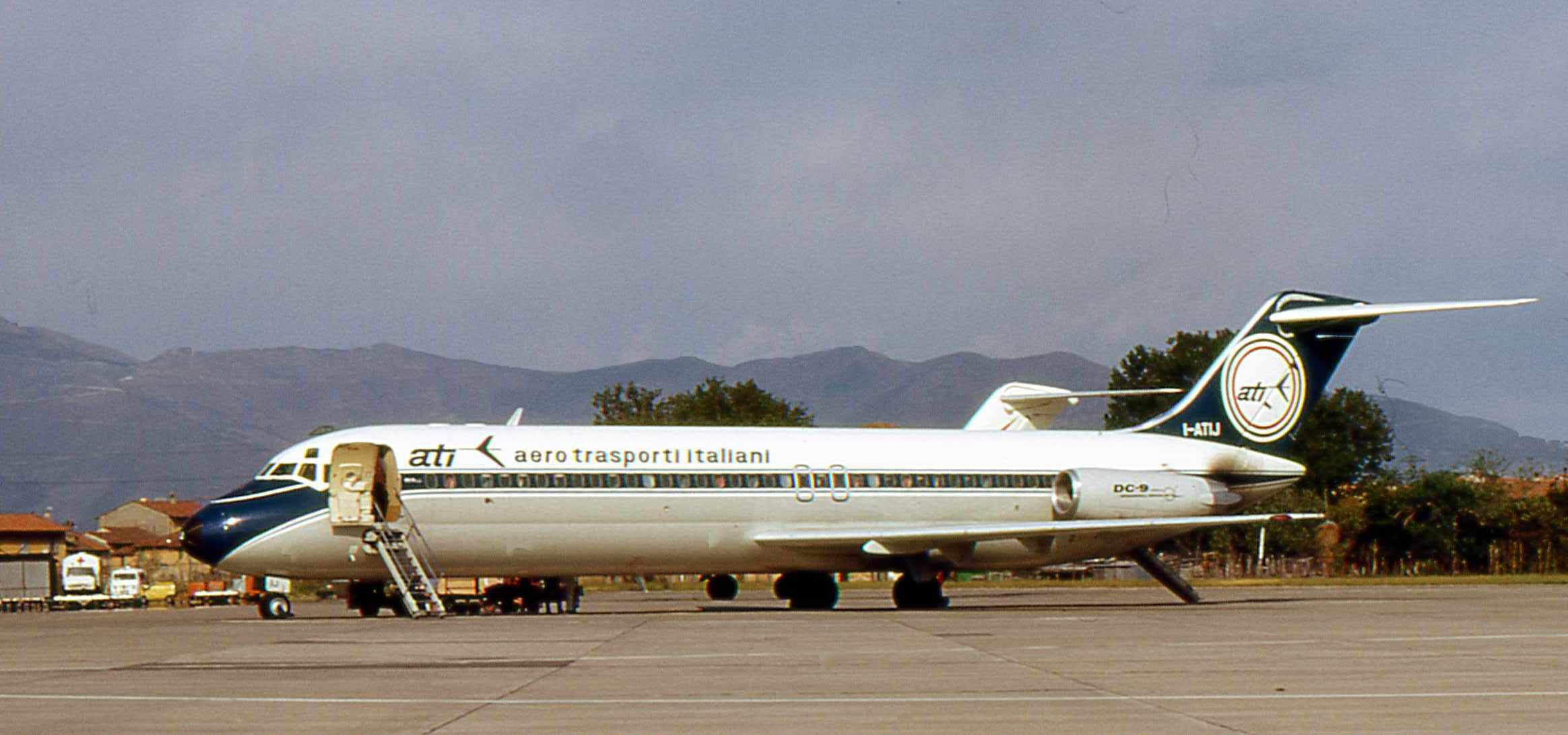
The Douglas DC-9 series 32 was the first jet aircraft operated by ATI.

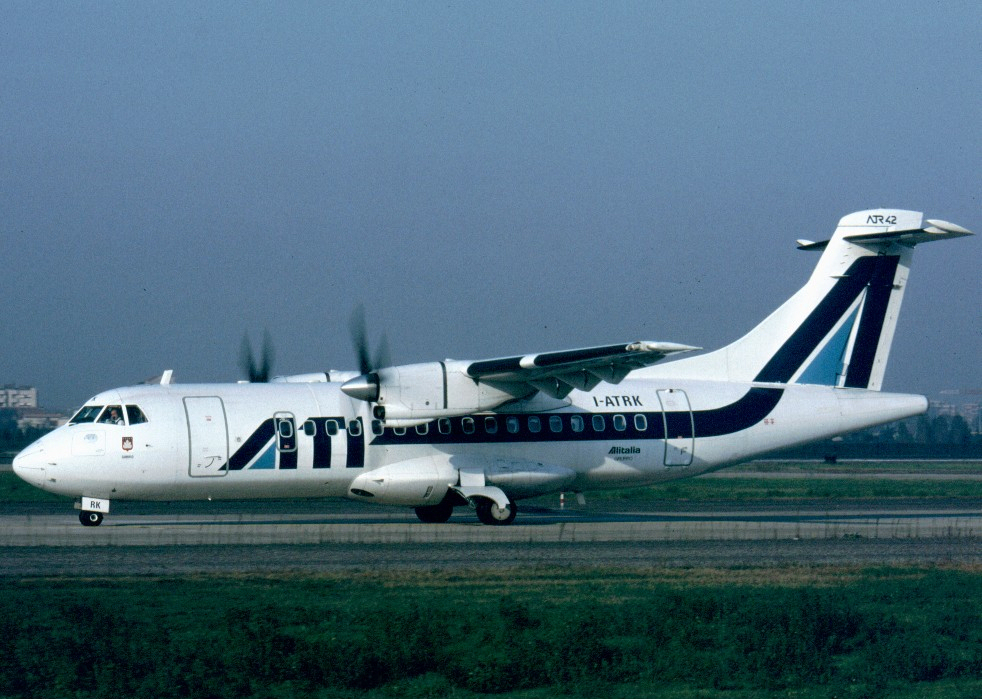
ATR 42-300 which had mixed reception from passengers.

Aero Trasporti Italiani S.p.A. (ATI) was an Italian airline headquartered in Naples, Italy. It was founded on 16 December 1963 as a subsidiary of Alitalia to take over secondary domestic routes in southern Italy operated by another Alitalia subsidiary Società Aerea Mediterranea.

== History ==
Alitalia was the major shareholder with the 90% of the airline's capital and the remaining 10% held from the state holding company IRI. The first company's president was General Giovanni Buonamico and Captain M. Mainetti was the General manager.

ATI started operations on 2 June 1964 from its headquarters and main hub at the Naples Capodichino airport with a pair of Fokker F27 aircraft, of which a total of 13 were delivered by 1969; the same year the first 4 Douglas DC-9-32s joined the fleet.

Initially, the company flew on the Trieste-Venice-Florence-Rome, Rome-Naples-Palermo-Trapani-Pantelleria, Palermo-Catania-Reggio Calabria-Naples-Rome and Rome-Grosseto-Milan routes. Characteristic of ATI in the years that followed were the east–west connections in southern Italy and the Adriatic route from Trieste to Brindisi with some stops.

An agreement, which became operational on 15 June 1966, was signed with Kingdom of Libya Airlines in order to run domestic routes in Libya and weekly flight to Malta, Tunis and Cairo with 2 Fokker F27s on wet lease until 1969.

In 1966 the Sardinia region was added to the system and the fleet reached 7 F27s aircraft and 300,000 passengers transported. In August 1967 ATI took over the management of the subsidiary Elivie from Alitalia, but had to cease its helicopter operations in 1971. The same year were delivered 10 DC-9-32 aircraft and ATI transported 1,800,000 passengers. In 1973 ATI received new 13 Douglas DC-9-32s.

In the 1980s, ATI gradually replaced its 27 DC-9-32 with 38 McDonnell Douglas MD-82, the Fokker fleet was replaced by 10 regional aircraft ATR 42. In 1994, Alitalia took over its subsidiary ATI completely for economic reasons, although officially part of the Alitalia fleet, several MD-82s flew in the following years still in the ATI livery with the exception of the lettering and the blue colour, that was identical to the Alitalia logo.

On 20 March 1981, Aermediterranea was formed as a joint-venture between Alitalia and ATI to replace the private airline Itavia on the Italian internal scene. Alitalia provided 55% of the capital and ATI the remaining 45%. After the revocation of the air operator's certificate of Itavia, the flight crew was transferred to Aermediterranea which was merged into ATI in March 1985.

Aero Trasporti Italiani was incorporated definitely into Alitalia on 30 October 1994.

== Fleet ==
Aero Trasporti Italiani fleet
Aircraft	Total	Introduced	Retired	Notes
ATR 42-300	10	1986	1990	
Fokker F27-200	9	1964	1986	2 leased to Libyan Airlines from 1967 to 1969
Fokker F27-400	2	1964	1986	1 leased from Fokker
Fokker F27-600	4	1964	1986	2 leased to the Italian Air Force for navigation calibration
McDonnell Douglas DC-9-32	30	1969	1994	21 delivered 9 leased from Alitalia
McDonnell Douglas MD-82	38	1985	1994	2 leased from Alitalia
SE-210 Caravelle	2	1972	1972	shorly leased from SAM

== Accidents and incidents ==
- 16 April 1972: a Fokker F27, operating Flight 392, departed from Rome to Foggia, and crashed near Ardinello di Amaseno. All 18 people on board died.
- 30 October 1972: a Fokker F27, operating Aero Trasporti Italiani Flight 327, departed from Naples to Bari and crashed into a hill about 43 miles (37 nmi; 69 km) from Bari. All 27 people on board died.
- 14 September 1979: a McDonnell Douglas DC-9-32, operating Aero Trasporti Italiani Flight 12, departed from Alghero to Cagliari and crashed into a ridge about 15 miles (13 nmi; 24 km) north of Cagliari. The pilot departed from the normal approach pattern to avoid thunderstorms. All 31 people on board died.
- 15 October 1987: an ATR-42 twin turboprop, operating ATI Flight 460, crashed at Conca di Crezzo near Lake Como, Italy, while en route from Milan to Cologne. Control of the aircraft was lost while flying in icy conditions. All 37 people on board were killed.

== See also ==
- List of defunct airlines of Italy
