= Itavia Flight 870 =

1980 aviation crash over the Tyrrhenian Sea

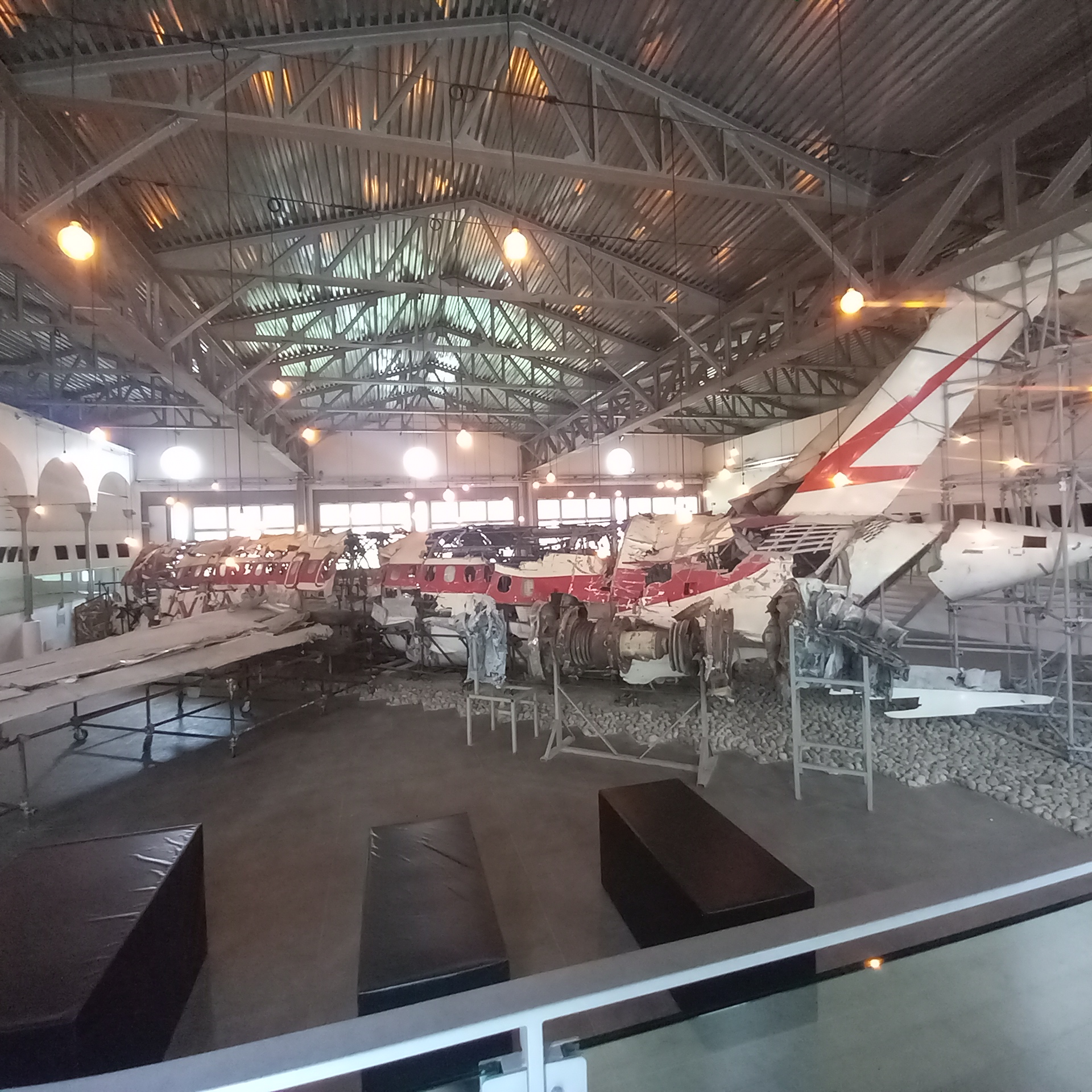
- Reconstructed wreckage of the aircraft at the Museum for the Memory of Ustica

Occurrence
- Date: 27 June 1980
- Summary: In-flight breakup; cause disputed
- Site: Tyrrhenian Sea, near Ustica, Italy; 38.839494°N 13.425293°E

Aircraft
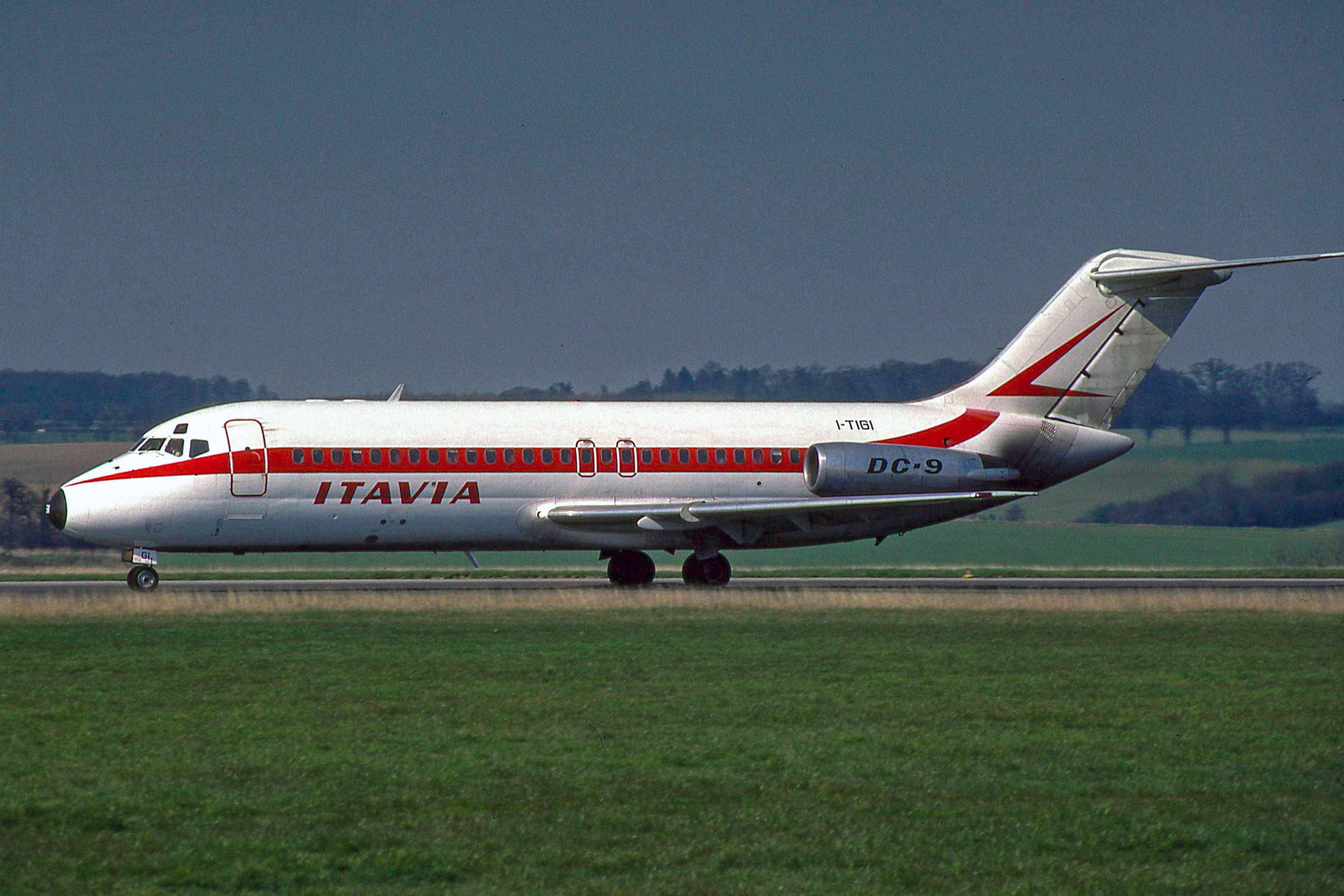
- I-TIGI, the aircraft involved, seen in April 1980
- Aircraft type: Douglas DC-9-15
- Operator: Itavia
- IATA flight No.: IH870
- ICAO flight No.: IHS870
- Call sign: ITAVIA 870
- Registration: I-TIGI
- Flight origin: Bologna Guglielmo Marconi Airport
- Destination: Palermo Punta Raisi Airport
- Occupants: 81
- Passengers: 77
- Crew: 4
- Fatalities: 81
- Survivors: 0

On 27 June 1980, Itavia Flight 870 (IH 870, AJ 421), a Douglas DC-9 passenger jet en route from Bologna to Palermo, Italy, crashed into the Tyrrhenian Sea between the islands of Ponza and Ustica at 20:59 CEST, killing all 81 occupants on board. Known in Italy as the Ustica massacre (Italian: strage di Ustica), the disaster led to numerous investigations, as well as legal actions and accusations; it continues to be a source of controversy, including claims of conspiracy by the Government of Italy and others.

Francesco Cossiga, the Prime Minister of Italy at the time, attributed the crash to the shooting down by a French missile during a dogfight between Libyan and French fighter jets. The technical commission's report concluded that a bomb hidden in the rear lavatory caused the aircraft's destruction. However, this conclusion still remains highly contested: the civil lawsuit in the 2010s, concerning compensation for the victims' families, instead, accepted as valid the theory that the aircraft had been caught up in an aerial battle. In September 2023, former Italian prime minister Giuliano Amato declared that the crash was "part of a plan to shoot down the airplane of Gaddafi".

== Aircraft ==
The location of the crash site between the departure and destination airports

The aircraft, flown as Aerolinee Itavia Flight 870, was a Douglas DC-9-15, serial number 45724, registered as I-TIGI. At the time of the crash, it had flown for 29,544 hours over 45,032 flights. The aircraft was manufactured in 1966 and delivered to Hawaiian Airlines registered as N902H.

== Disaster ==
On 27 June 1980 at 20:08 CEST, the aircraft departed with a delay of one hour and 53 minutes from Bologna Guglielmo Marconi Airport for a scheduled service to Palermo Punta Raisi Airport, Sicily. With 77 passengers aboard, Captain Domenico Gatti (44) and First Officer Enzo Fontana (32) were at the controls, with two flight attendants. The flight was designated IH 870 by air traffic control, while the military radar system referred to the same as AJ 421.

Contact was lost shortly after the last message from the aircraft was received at 20:37, giving its position over the Tyrrhenian Sea near the island of Ustica, about 120 kilometres (70 mi) southwest of Naples. At 20:59 CEST, the aircraft broke apart in mid-air and crashed. Two Italian Air Force F-104s were scrambled at 21:00 from Grosseto Air Force Base to locate the crash area and search for any survivors but failed to locate the area because of poor visibility. Floating wreckage parts were later found in the area. There were no survivors among the 81 occupants on board. In July 2006, the re-assembled fragments of the DC-9 were returned to Bologna from Pratica di Mare Air Force Base near Rome.

== Official statements and litigation ==
The perpetrators of the crime remain unidentified. After hearings held from 1989 to 1991, the Parliamentary Commission on Terrorism, headed by Senator Libero Gualtieri, issued an official statement concerning the crash of Flight 870, which became known as the "Ustica Massacre" (Strage di Ustica). Then the crash was referred to by a "prima facie" judicial act as "primarily an act of war, a de facto unreported war – as has been customary ever since Pearl Harbor, until the latest Balkan conflict – an international police operation, in fact, up to the great powers, since there was no mandate in this sense; a non-military coercive action exercised lawfully or illicitly, by one State against another; or an act of terrorism, as it was later claimed, of an attack on a head of state or regime leader."

A number of Italian Air Force personnel have been investigated and tried for a number of alleged offences, including falsification of documents, high treason, perjury, abuse of office and aiding and abetting. None have been convicted. On 30 April 2004, Generals Corrado Melillo and Zeno Tascio were held to be not guilty of high treason. Lesser charges against a number of other military personnel were also dropped. Other allegations could no longer be pursued after the expiration of the statute of limitations, since the disaster had occurred more than 15 years before, which included charges against Generals Lamberto Bartolucci and Franco Ferri. In 2005, an appeals court ruled that no evidence supported the charges. On 10 January 2007, Itay's Supreme Court of Cassation upheld this ruling and conclusively closed the case, fully acquitting Bartolucci and Ferri of any wrongdoing. In June 2010, Italian President Giorgio Napolitano urged all Italian authorities to cooperate in the investigation of the crash.

In September 2011, a Palermo civil tribunal ordered the Italian government to pay 100 million euros ($137 million) in civil damages to the relatives of the victims for failing to protect the flight, concealing the truth and destroying evidence. On 23 January 2013, the Civil Cassation Court ruled that there was "abundantly" clear evidence that the flight was brought down by a stray missile, confirming the lower court's order that the Italian government must pay compensation. In April 2015, an appeals court in Palermo confirmed the rulings of the 2011 Palermo civil tribunal and dismissed an appeal by the state attorney.

== Hypotheses on the causes ==
=== Terrorist bomb ===
After the series of bombings that hit Italy in the 1970s, a terrorist act was the first explanation to be proposed. As the flight was delayed in Bologna by almost three hours, a bomb's timer may have been set to actually cause an explosion at the Palermo airport, or on a further flight of the same aircraft. The 1990 judicial inquiry was supported by a technical commission, led by independent investigator Frank Taylor. The technical commission's report concluded that an explosion in the rear toilet, and not a missile strike, was the only conclusion supported by the wreckage analysis. A test explosion in a DC-9 lavatory had shown the resulting deformation in the surrounding structure to be almost identical to that of the crashed aircraft.

The technical commission's report was criticised in the Italian media by Corriere della Sera and La Repubblica. In particular it was stated that there was no evidence of explosive residue, per tests performed in 1994 by the Defence Research Agency in the United Kingdom. In addition, the toilet seat of the rear toilet, where the bomb had supposedly been detonated, was recovered undamaged.

=== Missile strike during military operation ===
Parts of the Italian media alleged that the aircraft was shot down during a dogfight involving Libyan, United States, French and Italian Air Force fighters in an assassination attempt by NATO members on an important Libyan politician, perhaps even Libyan leader Muammar al-Gaddafi, who was flying in the same airspace that evening. This version was supported in 1999 by Judge Rosario Priore, who said in his concluding report that his investigation had been deliberately obstructed by the Italian military and members of the secret service, in compliance with NATO requests.

According to the Italian media, documents from the archives of the Libyan secret service passed on to Human Rights Watch after the fall of Tripoli show that Flight 870 and a Libyan MiG were attacked by two French jets. On 18 July 1980, 21 days after the Itavia Flight 870 crash, a Libyan MiG-23MS was found crashed in the Sila Mountains in Castelsilano, Calabria, southern Italy. According to Libyan Air Force sources, the pilot was a victim of hypoxia. As his aircraft's autopilot was activated, it just kept flying straight and level until running out of fuel, and eventually crashed in the Sila Mountains.

In 2008, Francesco Cossiga (Prime Minister when the crash occurred) said that Itavia Flight 870 had been shot down by French warplanes. On 7 July 2008, a claim for damages was served on the French President. In 2023, former Italian Prime Minister Giuliano Amato said that France downed the aircraft while targeting a Libyan military jet in an attempt to kill Muammar Gaddafi. Amato said that Italy tipped off Libya about the planned assassination and consequently Gaddafi did not board the Libyan military jet.

=== Conspiracy theories ===
Several conspiracy theories explaining the disaster persist. For example, the vessel that carried out the search for debris on the ocean floor was French, but only US officials had access to the aircraft parts they found. Several radar reports were erased and several Italian generals were indicted 20 years later for obstruction of justice. The difficulty the investigators and the victims' relatives had in receiving complete and reliable information on the Ustica disaster has been popularly described as un muro di gomma ("a rubber wall") because investigations just seemed to "bounce back".

== Memorial ==
On 27 June 2007, the Museum for the Memory of Ustica was opened in Bologna. The museum is in possession of parts of the plane, which are assembled and on display, including almost all of the external fuselage. The museum also has objects belonging to those on board that were found in the sea near the plane. Christian Boltanski was commissioned to produce a site-specific installation. The installation consists of:

- 81 pulsing lamps hanging over the plane
- 81 black mirrors
- 81 loudspeakers (behind the mirrors)

Each loudspeaker describes a simple thought/worry (e.g. "when I arrive I will go to the beach"). All the objects found are contained in a wooden box covered with a black plastic skin. A small book with photos of all objects and various information is available to visitors upon request.

== Dramatization ==
The crash of Itavia Flight 870 was featured in the 13th season of the Canadian documentary series Mayday in an episode entitled "Massacre over the Mediterranean". The episode discussed the separate investigations into the event, and appeared to favour the investigation led by Frank Taylor, which concluded that the wreckage ruled out a missile and pointed to an explosion in or near the rear lavatory was the most likely. A 1991 Italian film by Marco Risi, The Invisible Wall, tells the story of a journalist in search of answers to the many questions left open by the crash. The film theorises on a few possible scenarios, including the possibility that the DC-9 was mistakenly shot down during an aerial engagement between NATO and Libyan jet fighters.

== See also ==
- List of aircraft accidents and incidents resulting in at least 50 fatalities
- List of unsolved murders

== Sources ==
- Cooper, Tom (2018). MiG-23 Flogger in the Middle East, Mikoyan i Gurevich MiG-23 in Service in Algeria, Egypt, Iraq, Libya and Syria, 1973-2018. Warwick: Helion & Company Publishing. ISBN 978-1-912-390328.
- Cooper, Tom; Grandolini, Albert; Delalande, Arnaud (2015). Libyan Air Wars, Part 1: 1973-1985. Helion & Company Publishing. ISBN 978-1-909982-39-0.
