= Aermediterranea =

Airline of Italy (1981–1985)

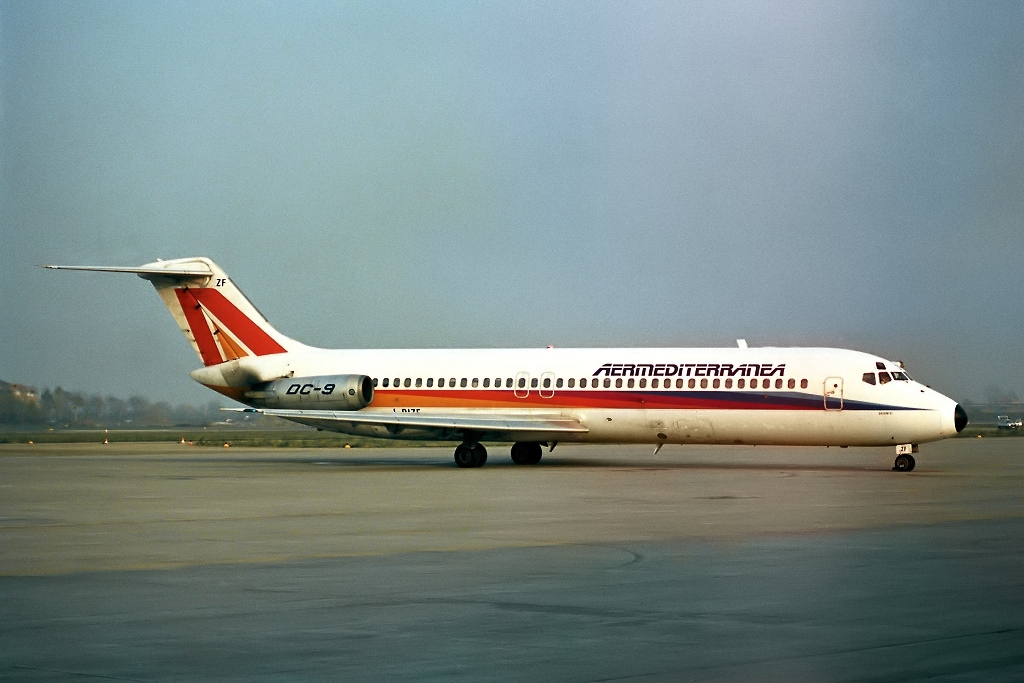
IATA	ICAO	Call sign
BQ	BQI	MEDITERRANEA
- Founded: 16 January 1981
- Commenced operations: 1 July 1981
- Ceased operations: 1985 (merged into Aero Trasporti Italiani)
- Hubs: Rome Fiumicino Airport
- Fleet size: 8
- Parent company: Alitalia

Aermediterranea was an Italian airline founded in 1981 as a subsidiary of Alitalia to replace Itavia on the Italian domestic scene. The airline was owned by Alitalia and ATI, and was later merged into ATI in 1985.

== History ==
The Italian Minister of Transport Rino Formica announced the formation of Aermediterranea as a joint-venture between Alitalia and ATI. Alitalia provided 55% of the capital and ATI provided the remaining 45%. After the revocation of the air operator's certificate of the private airline Itavia, all of the flight crew was transferred over to Aermediterranea.

The airline entered service on 1 July 1981, using McDonnell Douglas DC-9-32s, serving 572,000 passengers in 1982. In 1985, Aermediterranea ceased to exist and its employees and aircraft were transferred over to ATI, which was itself later absorbed by the parent company Alitalia in 1994.

== Fleet ==
The Aermediterranea fleet used at least seven McDonnell Douglas DC-9-32 aircraft.

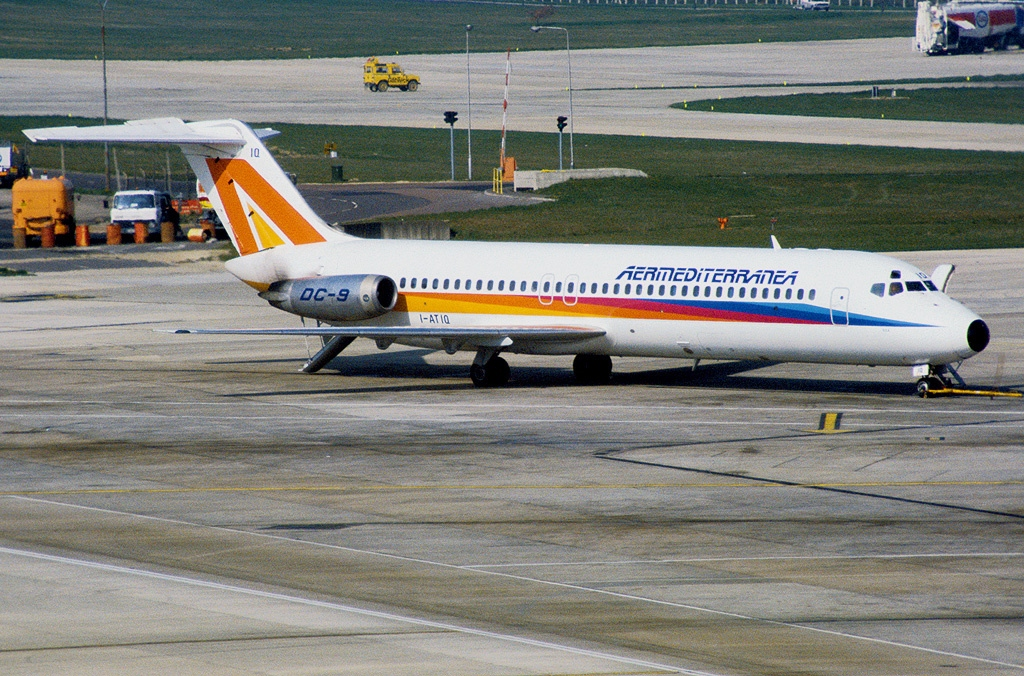
Aermediterranea McDonnell Douglas DC‑9‑32 at London Gatwick Airport, 1983

== Destinations ==
Aermediterranea started operations with domestic scheduled flights between a number of Italian cities, and on 31 March 1982 commenced charter services to and from cities elsewhere within Europe.

- Rome–Fiumicino
- Naples
- Milan
- Turin
- Bergamo
- Trieste
- Verona
- Venice
- Bologna
- Rimini
- Pisa
- Ancona
- Pescara
- Bari
- Lamezia Terme
- Brindisi
- Alghero
- Cagliari
- Palermo
- Trapani
- Catania
- Lampedusa

== See also ==
- List of defunct airlines of Italy
