= Saverio De Michele =

Italian businessman and politician (1923–2021)

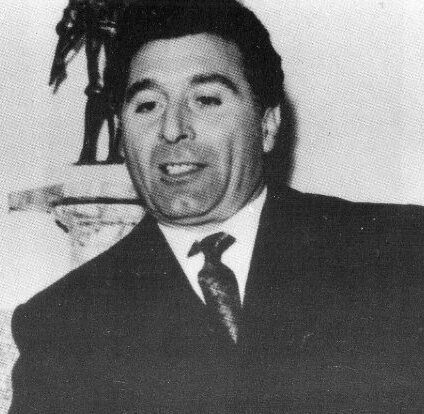

Mayor of Olbia
- In office 1956–1963
- Preceded by: Alessandro Nanni
- Succeeded by: Andreino Fiorentino

Personal details
- Born: 26 November 1923 Taranto, Kingdom of Italy
- Died: 29 March 2021 (aged 97) Olbia, Italy
- Party: DC

Saverio De Michele (26 November 1923 – 29 March 2021) was an Italian businessman and politician. He served as Mayor of Olbia from 1956 to 1963.

== Biography ==
De Michele was born into a family of entrepreneurial mussel farmers from Taranto. In 1956, he was elected Mayor of Olbia as a member of the Christian Democracy party with support from the Italian Social Movement and the Monarchist National Party. However, his cabinet was marred by controversies and he was forced to resign after 20 months. He served as Prefectural Commissioner from 1958 to 1960. In 1960, he was re-elected as Mayor but did not gain a majority in the municipal council.

In 1961, Eni announced their plans to build a petrochemical plant in the Gulf of Olbia. Despite a huge economic boost, the plant would have brought pollution. After sending a taskforce to investigate similar plants, De Michele refused to allow the plant to be built in Olbia due to its potential effect on the environment and tourism. It was instead built in Porto Torres. In 1962, Aga Khan IV founded the Costa Smeralda Consortium and intended to build in Gallura. The following year, Khan founded the Alisarda airline with its headquarters at the Venafiorita Airport. The airport was rather outdated, however, and the new Olbia Costa Smeralda Airport was built, contributing a vast amount of tourism to the city and becoming the most important airport on Sardinia.

De Michele authorized numerous expansions to Olbia's tourism industry, including Porto Rotondo. He requested the Cassa per il Mezzogiorno for funds to develop the city's industrial complex, but the money was instead used to develop the Port of Olbia.

In 1964, De Michele lost the nomination from the Christian Democrats and was not re-elected as Mayor.

Saverio De Michele died in Olbia on 29 March 2021 at the age of 97.
