= List of Air Italy destinations =

As of May 2019, Air Italy operated to 26 destinations in 13 countries from its hub in Milan and its focus city in Olbia. Air Italy announced that it would cease operations in February 2020.

This is a list of scheduled destinations which Air Italy flew to; the list includes the country, city, and airport names.

== Destinations ==
Country	City	Airport	Ref
Brazil	Natal	Greater Natal International Airport	
Canada	Toronto	Toronto Pearson International Airport	
Cuba	Havana	José Martí International Airport	
Egypt	Cairo	Cairo International Airport	
Egypt	Sharm El Sheikh	Sharm El Sheikh International Airport	
Ghana	Accra	Accra International Airport	
Italy	Bergamo	Orio al Serio International Airport	
Italy	Bologna	Bologna Guglielmo Marconi Airport	
Italy	Cagliari	Cagliari Elmas Airport	
Italy	Catania	Catania–Fontanarossa Airport	
Italy	Lamezia Terme	Lamezia Terme International Airport	
Italy	Milan	Milan Linate Airport	
Italy	Milan	Milan Malpensa Airport	
Italy	Naples	Naples International Airport	
Italy	Olbia	Olbia Costa Smeralda Airport	
Italy	Palermo	Falcone Borsellino Airport	
Italy	Rome	Leonardo da Vinci–Fiumicino Airport	
Italy	Turin	Turin Airport	
Italy	Venice	Venice Marco Polo Airport	
Italy	Verona	Verona Villafranca Airport	
Kenya	Mombasa	Moi International Airport	
Maldives	Malè	Velana International Airport	
Nigeria	Lagos	Murtala Muhammed International Airport	
Russia	Moscow	Moscow Domodedovo Airport	
Senegal	Dakar	Blaise Diagne International Airport	
Spain	Tenerife	Tenerife South Airport	
Tanzania	Zanzibar	Abeid Amani Karume International Airport	
Thailand	Bangkok	Suvarnabhumi Airport	
United Kingdom	London	Gatwick Airport	
United States	Los Angeles	Los Angeles International Airport	
United States	Miami	Miami International Airport	
United States	New York City	John F. Kennedy International Airport	
United States	San Francisco	San Francisco International Airport	
