= Air Italy (2018–2020) =

Italian airline

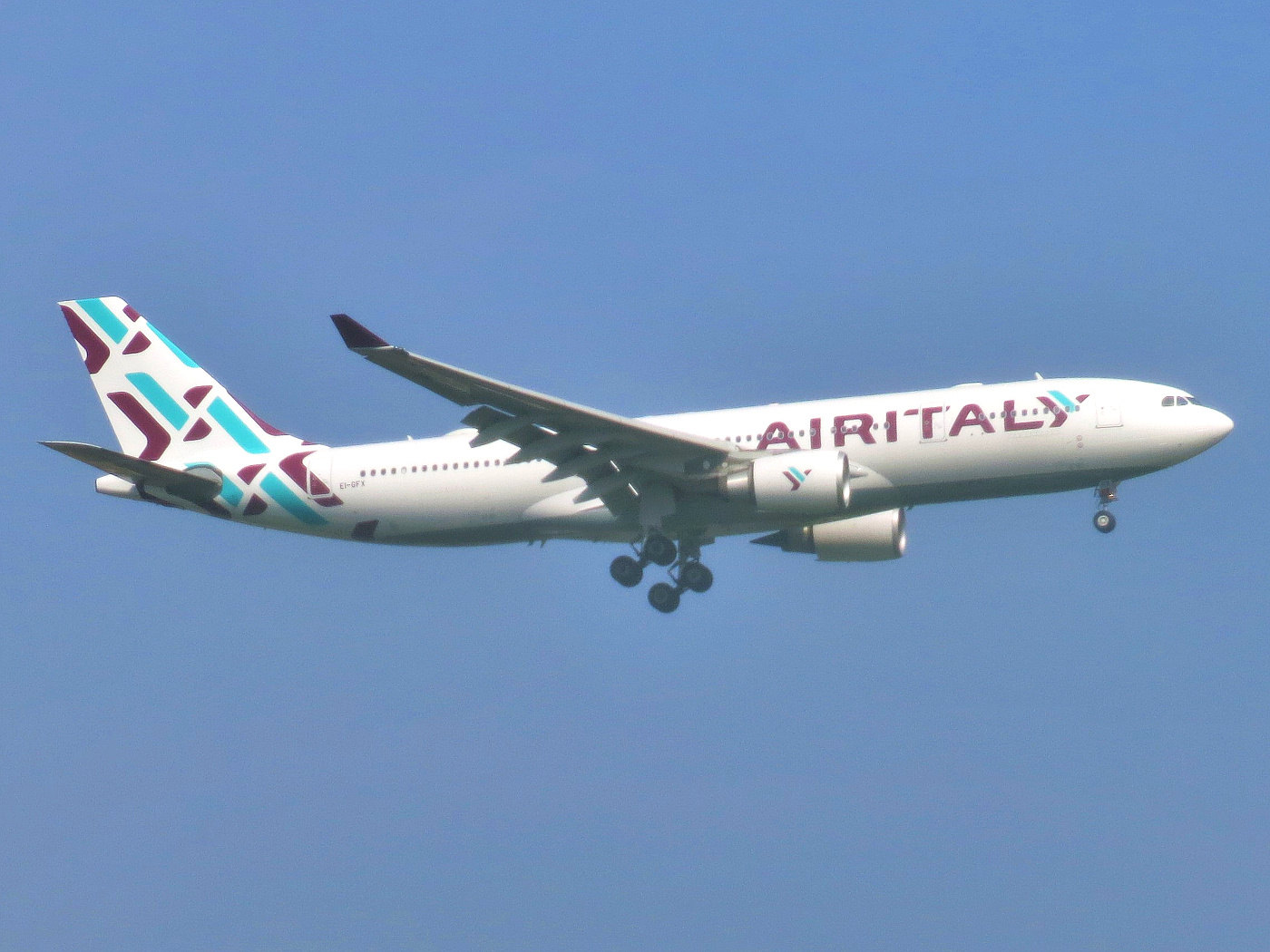
- Airbus A330-200
IATA	ICAO	Call sign
IG	ISS	AIR ITALY
- Founded: 29 March 1963 as Alisarda
- Commenced operations: 1 March 2018
- Ceased operations: 11 February 2020 (Note: The airline officially liquidated the company on 11 February 2020. However, on 19 February 2020, the airline re-opened ticket sales for their Milan Linate-Olbia and Rome-Fiumicino-Olbia Public service obligation routes and operated them until 16 April 2020.)
- AOC #: EY0F937F
- Hubs: Milan Malpensa Airport
- Frequent-flyer program: @MyAirItalyClub (part of Avios loyalty program)
- Subsidiaries: Air Italy Fleet Management; Meridiana Maintenance; Wokita
- Fleet size: 12
- Destinations: 26
- Parent company: AQA Holding S.p.A.
- Headquarters: Olbia, Sassari, Italy
- Key people: Roberto Spada (Chairman); Yousef Elzaro (CFO): Rossen Dimitrov (COO)
- Website: www.airitaly.com

Air Italy (registered as AIR ITALY S.p.A.) was a privately owned Italian airline, headquartered in Olbia, Sardinia. In 2019, the company was the second largest airline in Italy, behind Italian flag carrier Alitalia, and the 40th largest in Europe by number of passengers in 2019. The airline was a subsidiary of AQA Holding, owned by Alisarda (51%) and Qatar Airways (49%). The airline operated a fleet of Boeing 737NG, Boeing 737 MAX 8 and Airbus A330 aircraft to over 34 scheduled domestic, European and intercontinental destinations. The airline operated from its main hub at Milan Malpensa Airport.

On 11 February 2020, Air Italy ceased operations and went into liquidation, announcing that all routes would be served until 25 February 2020 by third-party carriers. However, on 19 February 2020, the airline re-opened ticket sales for their Milan Linate-Olbia and Rome-Fiumicino-Olbia PSO routes and operated them until 16 April 2020.

== History ==
=== Background ===
In 1963, Alisarda was established to provide a fast and reliable air service connecting Olbia, gateway to the newly created resort of the Costa Smeralda, and major Italian and European destinations. On 2 May 1991, the airline changed its name to Meridiana.

Subsequently rebranded Meridiana Fly after the acquisition and merger of defunct Italian airline Eurofly, the airline later returned to its original Meridiana name after acquiring former charter airline Air Italy (which operated from 2005 to 2018, operating under the Meridiana brand as of 2013).

=== Launch of the new Air Italy ===
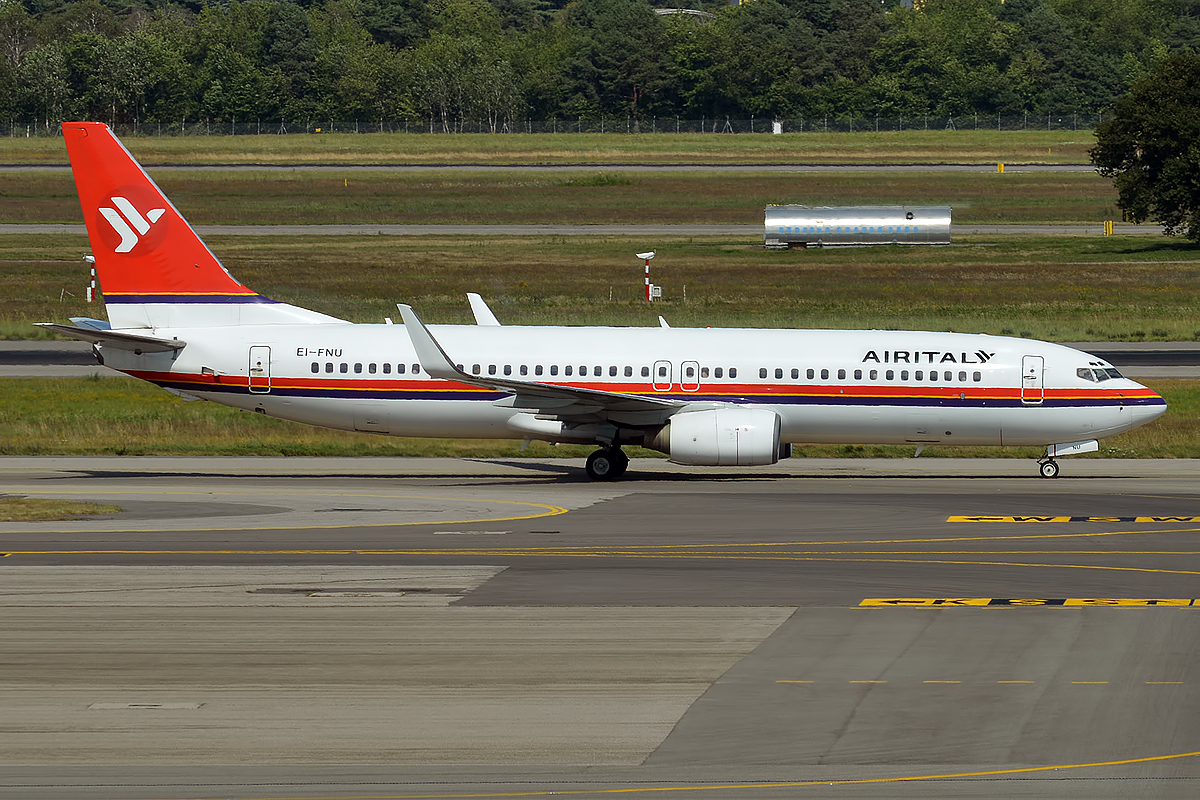
Air Italy Boeing 737-800 in a hybrid livery inherited from Meridiana

Air Italy was established on 19 February 2018. A press conference in Milan announced that Meridiana and its subsidiary, the original Air Italy, which had been part of Meridiana since 2013, would be merged to create the new Air Italy. The focus of the company was to introduce a stable new Italian airline which could become the flagship carrier of Italy. Air Italy's competitor Alitalia, the Italian flag carrier, had filed for administration on 2 May 2017. The plan also introduced new branding, a new cabin experience, new airport lounge and new destinations. During the press conference, the airline expressed interest in joining the Oneworld airline alliance. The airline also announced that Qatar Airways would have a Codeshare agreement with the airline.

All branding and business of the new Air Italy took effect on 1 March 2018. The Meridiana IATA, ICAO, and AOC codes were merged into the new Air Italy. The airline website was relaunched with the re-branding. Aircraft transferred from Meridiana still used the Meridiana livery with the Air Italy name. Meridiana codeshare agreements and slots were transferred to the new Air Italy brand.

=== 2018–2019 ===
In April 2018, Air Italy and Qatar Airways launched their planned codeshare on selected flights. On 18 April 2018, the airline appointed Neil Mills as chief operating officer (COO); he had worked with the recently bankrupt airline Air Berlin. The airline introduced Rossen Dimitrov as chief customer experience officer (CCEO) on 22 April.

On 22 April 2018, Air Italy became the Italian launch customer of the Boeing 737 MAX 8. The first aircraft, fully painted, was introduced to the public on Air Italy's social media pages and delivered at a handover ceremony with Boeing executives at Boeing's Everett Delivery Centre in Seattle on 11 May 2018. The airline celebrated the delivery of the aircraft on 14 May after the aircraft was handed over to Air Italy in Seattle. It then held a special press conference in a hangar at its Milan–Malpensa hub. The airline also introduced its new uniforms.

On 1 June 2018, Air Italy launched its new Milan Malpensa Airport to John F. Kennedy International Airport flight with the airline's first Airbus A330-200. The flight also marked the launch of its new seatback entertainment platform, onboard amenities and meal services. Air Italy continued to expand operations, launching more routes and services. In July, Air Italy attended the Farnborough Airshow showcasing its second 737 MAX 8, marking the first time the airline attended the airshow. On 20 September, it released its first summer season report, stating that it had reached 90% load factor on its new US routes and carried more than 500,000 passengers to and from Sardinia. On the back of the successful results, the airline announced new frequencies.

On 3 October 2018, Chief Operating Officer Neil Mills resigned for personal reasons. Rossen Dimitrov, the airline's chief customer experience officer, was appointed COO with immediate effect. In October 2018, Air Italy announced three appointments to senior positions: Elisabeth Milton as Vice President of Sales and Distribution, Nicola Pozzati as Chief Human Resources and Organisation Officer, and Simona Paccioretti as Head of Internal Auditing. Further executive appointments were made on 29 October 2018 with Captain Konstantinos Iliakis brought in as Account Manager and chief flight and ground operations officer. On 21 November, Valentina Quagliata was appointed SVP for Network, Planning, and Strategy. On the same day, Air Italy also announced a codeshare agreement with LATAM Brasil, effective immediately for selected flights between Italy and São Paulo–Guarulhos International Airport.

In December 2018, Air Italy announced the launch of its Milan Malpensa to Indira Gandhi International Airport and Chhatrapati Shivaji Maharaj International Airport, India. Air Italy also announced four new routes to North America: from Milan Malpensa to Los Angeles, San Francisco, and Chicago in the United States and Milan Malpensa to Toronto, Canada.

On 11 February 2019, Air Italy announced frequency increase on flights to Toronto and Miami. On 15 February, it announced its sponsorship of Toronto Pride as official European carrier.

On 19 February, Air Italy received a Business Traveller "Cellar in the sky 2018" award. On 25 February, the airline announced it was the official carrier of the 2019 Gelato Festival.

On 28 February, it signed a third codeshare agreement with Bulgaria Air.

On 12 March 2019, during the Boeing 737 MAX groundings, Air Italy grounded all its Boeing 737 MAX 8 aircraft as a result of a European Aviation Safety Agency directive. Two days after the grounding, Air Italy's codeshare partner Bulgaria Air leased an A319 to Air Italy.

On 14 March, Air Italy announced that Sergio Boscarol, Head of Corporate and Commercial HR at rival Alitalia, had been named Air Italy's Chief Human Resources and Organization Officer. On 3 April 2019, the airline launched its Milan to Los Angeles International Airport flight and its new business class on-board experience. On 10 April 2019, it launched its Milan to San Francisco International Airport flight. On 18 April, the airline publicly responded to allegations from the top three US airlines, Delta, American Airlines, and United, that Air Italy was being used as a Fifth Freedom airline by Qatar Airways.

Later that week, Air Italy made an announcement of its upcoming winter routes and also announced that flights to Los Angeles, San Francisco, and Toronto would be seasonal. On 6 May 2019, Air Italy launched its third North American destination from Milan to Toronto Pearson International Airport. Later that month, it announced a new partnership with comedienne Caroline Reid (known as Pam Ann) serving as Air Italy's global brand ambassador. On 17 May 2019, Air Italy announced a rebranding of its frequent-flyer program, changing the name from Meridiana Club to @MyAirItalyClub.

On 14 June 2019, Air Italy signed a Special Prorate Agreement with Alaska Airlines adding more connections to ten new US/Mexico destinations, including Anchorage, Honolulu, Las Vegas, Seattle, Portland, Palm Springs, San Diego, Newark, San Jose, CA and Guadalajara, Mexico. On 5 July, the airline announced its winter schedule with new destinations to the Maldives, Tenerife, Mombasa and Zanzibar. It announced the adoption of Fast Track at its Milan Malpensa hub and Linate airport on 8 July. On 10 July, Air Italy signed a second Special Prorate Agreement with Aegean Airlines, with new connections to Athens.

On 10 September 2019, Air Italy was awarded four stars in the annual APEX passenger ratings. On 11 September, the airline launched new inflight menus and services for economy passengers on long-haul flights. On 17 September, it received an award for most LGBTQ+ friendly Italian airline. In September 2019, Air Italy won AIR Convention Europe's Diversity Award and Most Captivating Marketing Project award.

On 8 November 2019, Air Italy appointed Shiju Thomas chief information officer and on 12 November, Yousef Elzaro chief financial officer. On 14 November, Air Italy's board of directors announced it had appointed Roberto Spada to replace Francesco Violante, who stepped down as chairperson on 31 October 2019.

=== Liquidation ===
On 11 February 2020, Air Italy ceased its own operations, following a Air Italy shareholders' meeting (Alisarda and Qatar Airways through AQA Holding S.p.A.). According to the airline, its flights were operated by other carriers according to the original schedule between 11 and 25 February.

On 19 February, Air Italy reopened ticket sales for two public service obligation (PSO) routes, Milan Linate-Olbia and Rome-Fiumicino-Olbia, planning to operate on them between 14 March and 16 April, the date of PSO contract expiry. The airline ultimately did so until 3 February 2020, when the Olbia Costa Smeralda Airport closed due to maintenance work for 40 days.

The last Air Italy flight to land at Milan Malpensa Airport was Flight IG996, operated by an Wamos Air Airbus A330-200, from Male Airport, landing at 17:00 on 26 February 2020.

On 25 August 2020, the Italian Civil Aviation Authority (ENAC) suspended Air Italy's air transport licence.

== Corporate affairs ==
=== Ownership and structure ===
Air Italy S.p.A. was 100% owned by its parent company AQA Holding S.p.A., founded on 2 September 2017 after Qatar Airways purchased a 49% stake in Meridiana (later rebranded the new Air Italy). Alisarda retained a 51% stake.

Air Italy had three subsidiaries inherited from Meridiana after a merger with the former Air Italy to form a new airline.

- Meridiana Maintenance S.p.A., an airline maintenance company, founded after Meridiana merged with Italian airline Eurofly, with a hangar is located at Olbia Costa Smeralda Airport in Olbia, Italy next to the Air Italy headquarters. On 10 September 2018, Air Italy announced it would be insourcing Meridiana Maintenance as of 1 October 2018.
- Wokita S.r.l, a tour operator, offering a range of tourism products such as package tours, flights, hotels and resorts in seaside areas, yachting and activity holidays.
- Air Italy Fleet Management Company S.p.A., a temporarily created company (formerly the original Air Italy) to remain in operation until all original Meridiana aircraft (Boeing 737-700, 737-800, 767-300ER) leases expired.

=== Head office and Leadership ===
Air Italy's headquarters were located in Olbia Costa Smeralda Airport in Olbia, Italy, formerly owned by Meridiana.

The Leadership team at Air Italy was as follows:

- Roberto Spada, Chairperson
- Rossen Dimitrov, chief operating officer
- Shiju Thomas, chief information officer
- Yousef Elzaro, chief financial officer
- Ct. Konstantinos Iliakis, Chief Flight and Ground Operations Officer
- Sergio Boscarol, Chief Human Resources and Organization Officer

=== Corporate identity ===
The Air Italy logo was designed with maroon and mint green colors that were loosely based on the maroon from the Qatar Airways logo. The airline had a special design to make the letter "Y" reminiscent of a bird. The aircraft livery was white with the billboard style logo painted across the fuselage. It also included a collage of the stylistic "Y" taken from the logo on the aircraft fin. The Y was also present on the aircraft engines.

=== Sponsorships ===
Air Italy sponsored a professional sports team, the Italian Dinamo Sassari basketball team.

=== Controversies ===
The United States' three largest airlines, Delta, American Airlines, and United, made allegations regarding Air Italy's ownership and operation because of its support from Qatar Airways. Air Italy made a public statement on the issue with a press release on 18 April 2019. Ed Bastian, chief executive officer of Delta, posted an op-ed article on the airline in December 2018 claiming that since Qatar Airways is a state-funded airline of Qatar supporting a nearly bankrupt Italian airline, it was "putting thousands of American jobs at risk". A few US politicians wrote letters to United States Secretary of State, Mike Pompeo, alleging that Qatar was in violation of the United States-Qatar Open Skies Policy. Air Italy and Qatar Airways denied the allegations, stating that they were borne of Qatar Airways' 49% stake in Air Italy's parent company.

== Destinations ==
As of February 2019, Air Italy operated to 21 year-round and five seasonal destinations in Europe, Africa, Asia and North America. Air Italy aimed to fly on more than 50 year-round routes by 2022, as stated in the airline's five-year plan. The airline operated most flights out of its main Milan Malpensa hub, and a second network out of its Olbia, Sardinia focus city.

=== Codeshare agreements ===
Air Italy had codeshare agreements with the following airlines:

- Air Malta
- Air Moldova
- British Airways
- Bulgaria Air
- Iberia
- LATAM Brasil
- Oman Air
- Qatar Airways
- S7 Airlines

=== Special Prorate Agreement ===
Air Italy had Special Prorate Agreements with the following airlines:

- Aegean Airlines
- Alaska Airlines
- El Al
- Finnair
- Hawaiian Airlines
- Pakistan International Airlines
- Tunisair

== Fleet ==
=== Final fleet ===
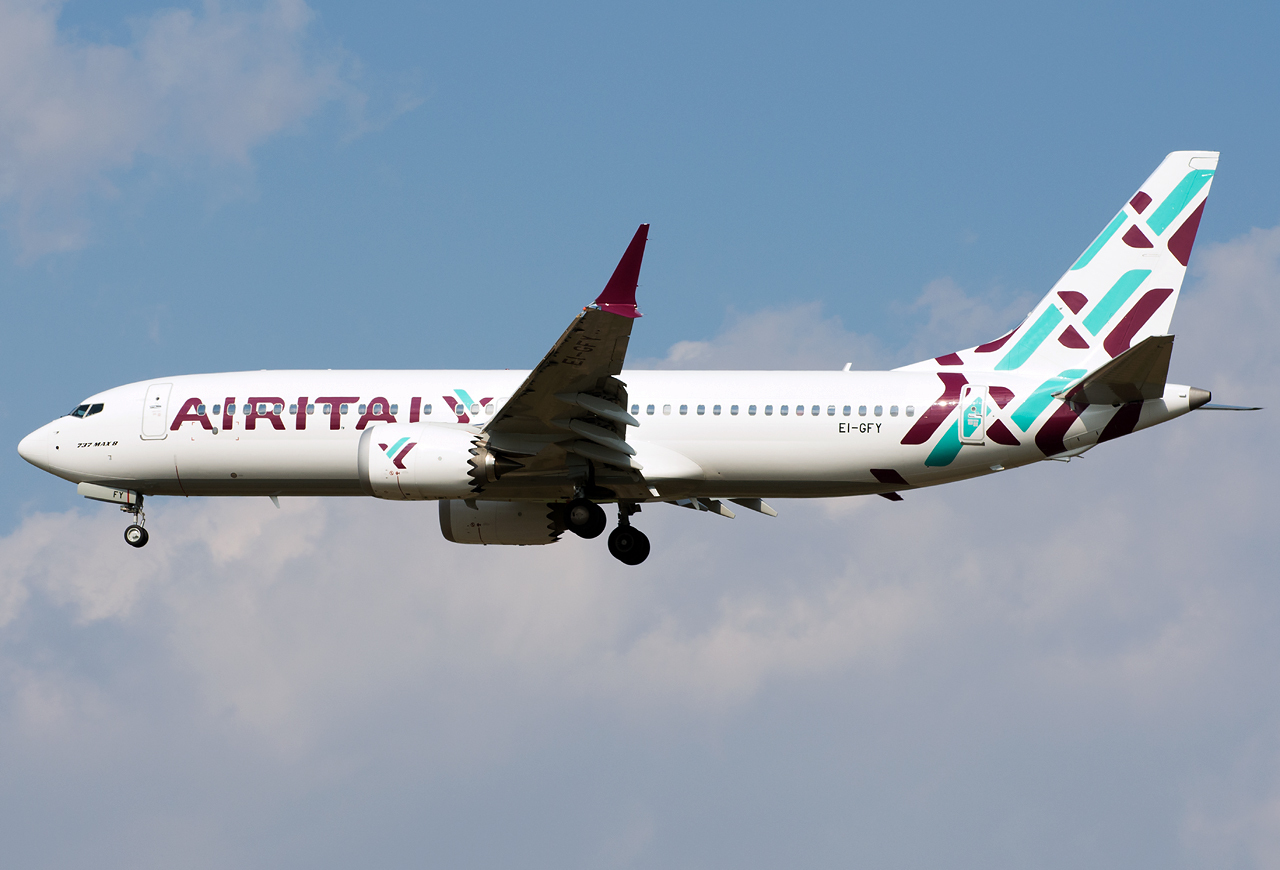
Air Italy Boeing 737 MAX 8

At the time Air Italy ceased operations in February 2020, airline's fleet consisted of the following aircraft:

Air Italy Fleet
Aircraft	In Service	Orders	Passengers			Notes
Aircraft	In Service	Orders	C	Y	Total	Notes
Airbus A330-200	4	—	24	228	252	
Boeing 737-700	1	—	—	149	149	
Boeing 737-800	4	—	—	189	189	
Boeing 737 MAX 8	3	—	12	174	186	
Total	12	—				

=== Fleet development ===
After rebranding of the airline as Air Italy, Boeing 737 aircraft that had been operated by Meridiana were used to operate the airline's route network. Air Italy planned to develop its fleet by operating 50 new aircraft by 2022, by sub-leasing 20 Boeing 737 MAX 8s and 30 Boeing 787-8s from Qatar Airways, with entry into service between 2018 and 2022. From 2018 to 2019, Qatar Airways planned to lease five of its own Airbus A330-200s to Air Italy at market rate, with Boeing 787-8s transferred to Air Italy from mid-2019 after the delivery of Boeing 787-9s to Qatar Airways during the same period.

In May 2019, the airline said that due to delays in the delivery of Qatar Airways' Boeing 787-9s, the planned transfer of Qatar's Boeing 787-8s to Air Italy had been delayed, resulting in its decision to expand long-haul operations with additional Airbus A330s from Qatar Airways. Additionally, after the airline's first three Boeing 737 MAX 8s were grounded, the possibility of transitioning to an Airbus narrow-body fleet was considered.

=== Historical Air Italy Fleet ===
Air Italy used to operate the following aircraft types:

Air Italy Historical Fleet
Aircraft	Total	Introduced	Retired	Replacement	Notes
Boeing 767-300ER	3	2018	2019	Airbus A330-200	Taken over from predecessor Meridiana.

== Onboard services ==
=== Business class ===
Business class was offered on Air Italy's Airbus A330 and Boeing 737 MAX aircraft. Business class on the Airbus A330 was configured with flat-bed seats in a 2-2-2 layout, while the Boeing 737 MAX was configured with seats in a 3–3 layout identical to that of economy class, but with the middle seat blocked. On flights operated by the Airbus A330, an amenity kit by Italian brands Fedon and Acca Kappa, along with designer pajamas and slippers were provided, and an extensive, personalized meal service was offered. All business class seats were also equipped with AC power ports.

=== Economy class ===
Economy class on the Airbus A330 was fitted with slimline seats in a 2-4-2 layout, while economy class on the Boeing 737 and 737 MAX was fitted with seats in a 3–3 layout. AC power ports were available, but only on the airline's Airbus A330 and Boeing 737 MAX aircraft. On medium and long-haul flights, a complimentary meal was served, while short-haul flights offered a complementary drinks service with additional snacks.

=== In-flight entertainment ===
The airline's in-flight entertainment was only available on its Airbus A330 aircraft, equipped with personal seat-back television screens and USB charging ports at every seat. The A330 aircraft also offered in-flight satellite Wi-Fi for an additional fee. For business class passengers, 60MB of complimentary Wi-Fi data was provided.

=== In-flight magazine ===
Air Italy's in-flight magazine was called Atmosphere and was inherited from Meridiana. It was produced by travel media experts Ink, based in the UK.

=== Frequent-flyer program ===
@MyAirItalyClub was Air Italy's frequent-flyer program, launched on 17 May 2019. Through the program, customers could earn Avios points from Air Italy flights; these could also be earned or redeemed with partner airlines British Airways and Iberia, as well as partner car rentals, hotel bookings, news subscriptions, utilities, and more. The program used to be known as Meridiana Club.

== See also ==
- List of defunct airlines of Italy
