= Venafiorita Airport =

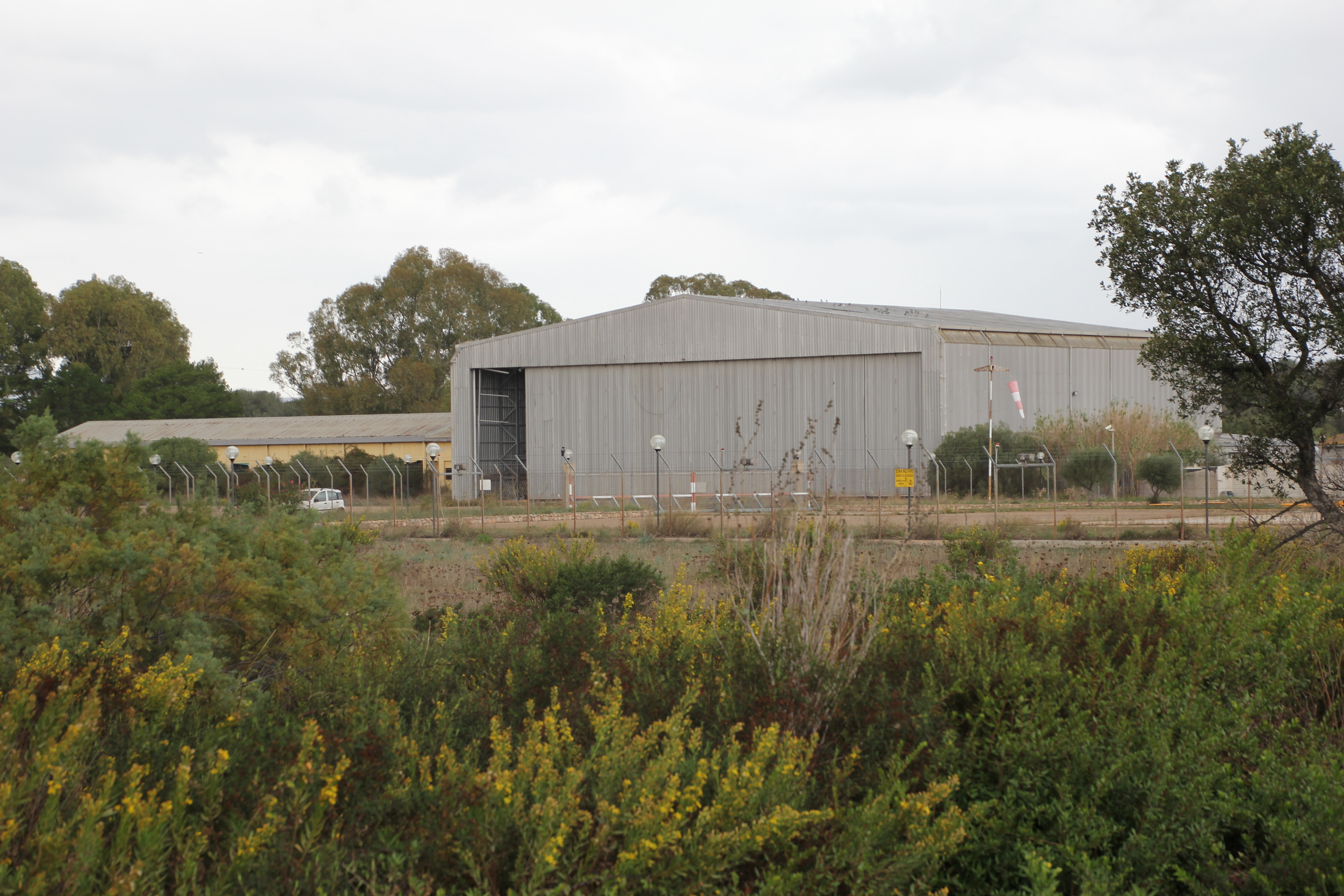
- IATA: none; ICAO: LIEV

Summary
- Airport type: Public, Military, now Defunct
- Serves: Olbia
- Location: Olbia, Italy
- Coordinates: 40°51′58″N 009°29′48″E

Map
- Location in Italy

Venafiorita Airport, also known as Olbia-Venafiorita Airport, was a public and military airport which serviced the town of Olbia, Sardinia, Italy. It was replaced by the Olbia-Costa Smeralda Airport in the 1970s.

It was the main hub for the Alisarda airlines.

Today the former Venafiorita airport hosts the 10th Carabinieri helicopter Unit.
