= Meridiana =

Privately owned Italian airline

Meridiana S.p.A.
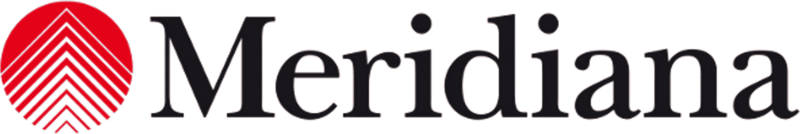
IATA	ICAO	Call sign
IG	ISS	MERIDIANA
- Founded: 29 March 1963 as Alisarda
- Commenced operations: 9 June 1964 as Alisarda; 1 September 1991 as Meridiana (Meridiana S.p.A.); February 2010 as "Meridiana fly"
- Ceased operations: 28 February 2018 (reorganized into 2nd Air Italy)
- AOC #: EY0F937F
- Hubs: Olbia Costa Smeralda Airport
- Focus cities: Leonardo da Vinci–Fiumicino Airport (Rome); Naples International Airport; Olbia Costa Smeralda Airport; Verona Villafranca Airport
- Frequent-flyer program: Meridiana Club (Part of Avios Loyalty program)
- Subsidiaries: Air Italy (from 2011); Meridiana Maintenance; Wokita
- Fleet size: 11
- Destinations: 66
- Parent company: AQA Holding
- Headquarters: Olbia, Sassari, Italy
- Key people: Francesco Violante, President
- Website: meridiana.com

Meridiana S.p.A., and later Meridiana fly, was an Italian airline active in scheduled and charter air transport, operating on a national and international scale. The company's headquarters were located in Olbia (north-eastern Sardinia), while the main hub was Olbia Costa Smeralda Airport. The airline, which since 2013 also fully controlled the fellow Italian airline Air Italy, was itself lately controlled by AQA Holding. On 1 March 2018, the air carrier changed its name to Air Italy, maintaining the same flight codes.

== History ==
=== Alisarda's legacy ===
On 3 May 1991, the extraordinary shareholders' meeting of Alisarda resolved to change the company name to Meridiana S.p.A. effective 1 September, and a new logo was created. These changes were made to reflect the expansion of the company's operations to Europe. That same year, new national and international flights were inaugurated from Verona and Florence. A large hangar was built at the Tuscan capital's airport to house and maintain the recently delivered BAe.146s. The British four-engine aircraft immediately opened new routes from the Tuscan capital to Catania and Palermo. In 1992, the fleet consisted of 16 aircraft, including McDonnell Douglas MD-82s, McDonnell Douglas DC-9-51s, and British Aerospace 146-200s. The company employed 1,414 people. That same year, it carried 1,932,000 passengers, generating an operating turnover of 342 billion Liras. By the end of the 1990s, passengers had risen to 3,075,000, reaching 3,531,000 in 2000. At the end of 1999 the company had a 17% Italian market share, 1,500 employees, 21 aircraft, and flew to 16 domestic destinations.

=== Two mergers in four years ===
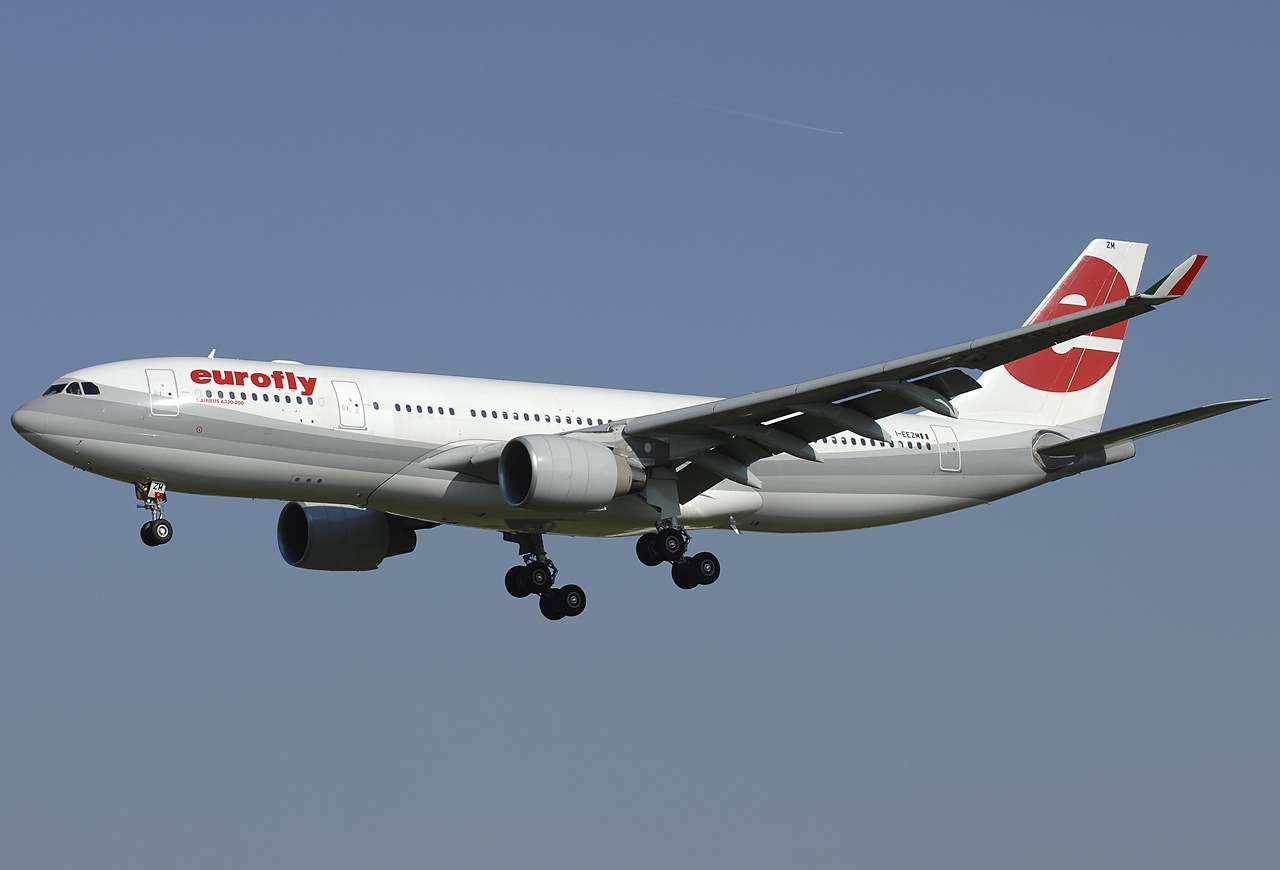
An Airbus A330-200 operated by Eurofly

On 19 July 2011, a plan to integrate and acquire fellow Italian charter airline Air Italy was announced. In October, Meridiana fly completely acquired the airline.

In January 2013, following unfavorable financial results and worsening debt, the Aga Khan regained control of the company, recapitalizing it with €uros 190 million. After an initial period of distinction between Meridiana fly and Air Italy, a rebranding process began in the following month of March. In April 2013, when the Air Italy Meridiana Fly returned to its former, shorter name, Meridiana. The Group adopted a common livery and logo, ensuring that Air Italy and Meridiana fly operated together as airlines with the same commercial offering. From then on, even though all flights were operated as Meridiana, two Air Operator Certificates (AOC) remained valid, with their respective operating structures, flight crews, and employment contracts. On 16 May, it launched the new frequent-flyer program Meridiana Club in partnership with Avios. Since 18 November 2014 Meridiana Club frequent flyers were able to earn Avios points on British Airways and from 23 March 2015 on Iberia. In that same December 2014, Meridiana retired its last Airbus aircraft, two A320-200s, to pursue the aim of operating an all Boeing fleet together with Air Italy.

In 2015, the international flight schedule included the following destinations:

- from Ancona: Sharm-el-Sheikh
- from Bergamo: Cabo Verde, Marsa Alam, Sharm-el-Sheikh
- from Milan (Malpensa airport): Dakar, Fort-de-France, Fortaleza, Fuerteventura, Havana, La Romana, Malé, Marsa Alam, Mauritius, Mombasa, Natal, Pemba Island, Santa Clara, Sharm-el-Sheikh, Teneriffe, Varadero, Zanzibar
- from Milan (Linate airport): Munich
- from Neaples: London, Madrid
- from Rome (Fiumicino airport): Fuerteventura, Marsa Alam, Mauritius, Mombasa, Sharm-el-Sheikh, Teneriffe, Zanzibar
- from Verona: Cancun, Fuerteventura, Havana, Marsa Alam, Mombasa, Sharm-el-Sheikh

At the same time, the following Italian cities were connected to each other: Bergamo, Bologna, Cagliari, Catania, Milan (both Linate and Malpensa airports), Neaples, Olbia, Rome, Turin. Verona.

=== AQA Holding and Qatar Airways partner ===
On 14 July 2016, an agreement was signed for Qatar Airways to purchase a stake in Meridiana fly. The contract allowed the company to relaunch after years of crisis, thanks to an industrial plan aimed at repaying the Group's debt and growing the brand. On 28 September 2017, Qatar Airways officially acquired 49% of AQA Holding, established earlier that month by Alisarda S.p.A. to control the two airlines. In the following December, the airline announced the restructuring of its network: all routes from Milan-Linate would be abolished with the exception of that to Olbia, while destinations from Milan-Malpensa to New York and Miami would be added, operated with Airbus A330-200s leased from Qatar Airways. Meridiana further announced that it would become the first Italian airline to take delivery of Boeing 737 MAX 8s. It was also reported that new full-flat business class seats and in-flight Wi-fi would be installed on the new Airbus A330s to be received from Qatar Airways.

=== Again Air Italy ===
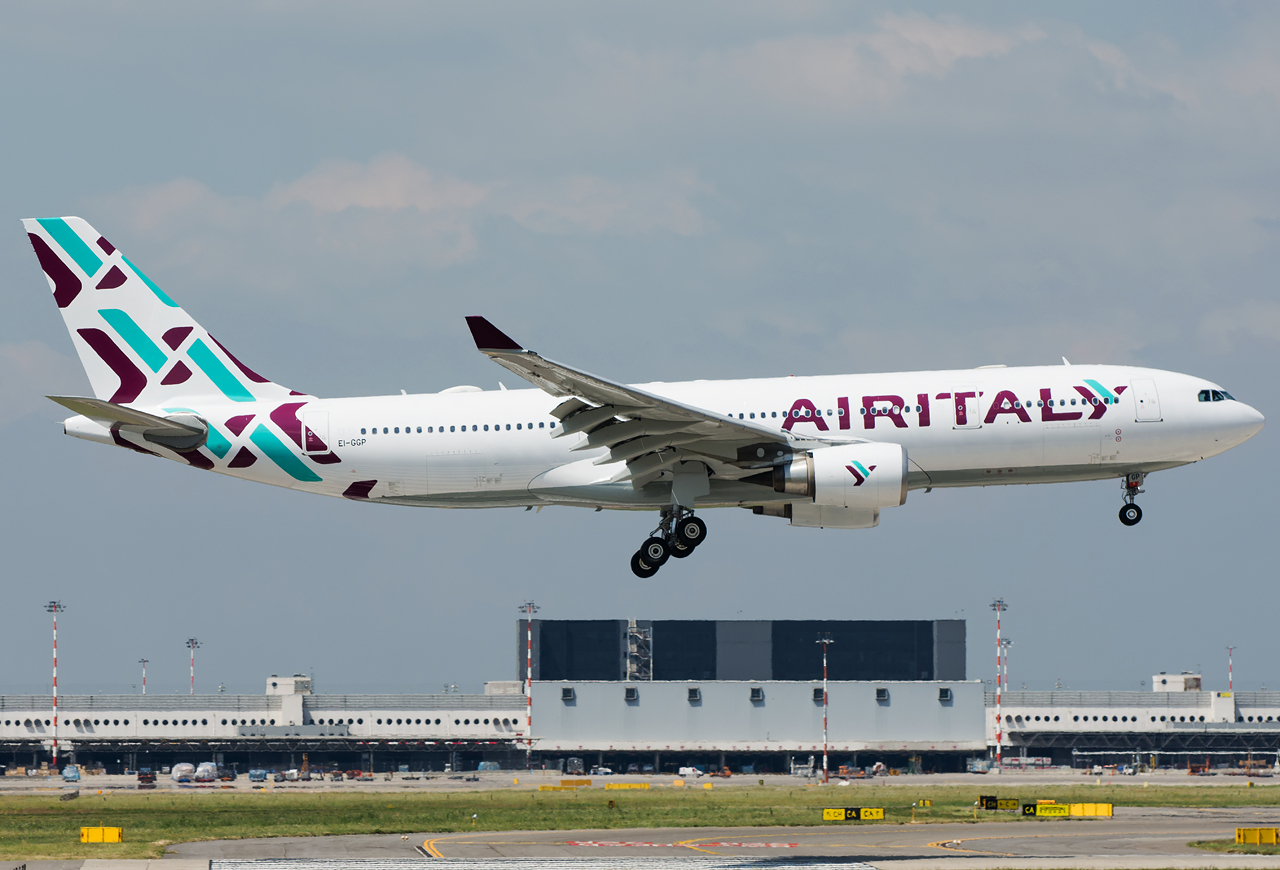
Airbus A330-202

On 1 March 2018, Meridiana officially changed its name to Air Italy (2nd airline with this corporate name). The change included a new livery and an increase in domestic and international destinations. All of this was intended to make the airline "Italy's national carrier". In reality, things turned out quite differently, partly due to the COVID-19 pandemic, officially declared on 30 January 2020. As early as February 11, Air Italy resolved to go into voluntary liquidation and cease flight operations.

== Corporate affairs ==
=== Head office ===
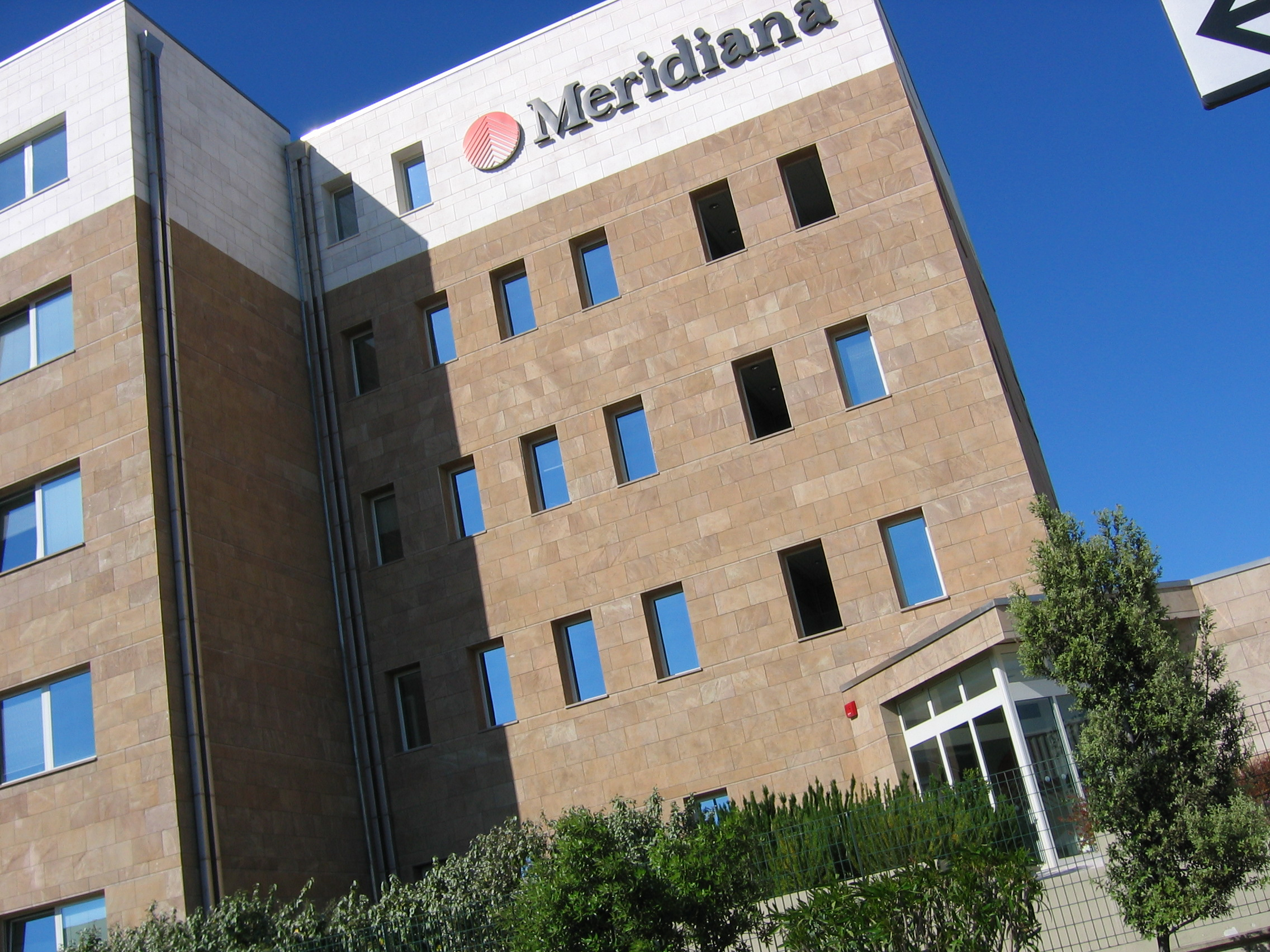
Meridiana Headquarters

Meridiana's head office was located at Olbia Costa Smeralda Airport in Olbia city, Sardinia, Italy.

=== Subsidiaries ===
Meridiana had four subsidiaries.

- Air Italy (2005–2018) since April 2013 and which will become Meridiana name as from March 1, 2018
- Meridiana Maintenance S.p.A., the maintenance company established after Meridiana merged with eurofly. The facilities were located at Olbia Costa Smeralda Airport, next to the Meridiana headquarter.
- Wokita S.i.r was a tour operator that offered a wide and extensive range of tourist products such as package tours, flights, hotels, and resorts in seaside areas, yachting, and activity holidays since 2006.
- Meridiana Air S.A., a Spanish 29% owned airline which firstly coordinated and later took over the operations of three local airlines

== Codeshare agreements ==
Meridiana codeshared with the following airlines:

- Air Malta
- Air Moldova
- Blue Air
- Blue Panorama Airlines
- British Airways
- Iberia
- S7 Airlines

== Fleet ==
At the time of change to Air Italy, Meridiana fleet consisted of the following aircraft:

Aircraft	In service	Orders	Passengers			Notes
Aircraft	In service	Orders	J	Y	Total	Notes
Boeing 737-700	1	—	—	149	149	Transferred to Air Italy
Boeing 737-800	7	—	—	189	189	Transferred to Air Italy
Boeing 767-300ER	3	—	12	276	288	Transferred to Air Italy
Boeing 767-300ER	3	—	—	304	304	Transferred to Air Italy
Total	11	—				

=== Historical fleet ===
Meridiana previously operated the following aircraft types:

Aircraft	Total	Introduced	Retired	Remark
Airbus A319-100	5	2004	2010	EI-DEY, EI-DEZ, EI-DFA, EI-DFP, I-EEZQ
Airbus A320-200	12	2010	2015	
Airbus A330-200	3	2010	2015	I-EEZJ, I-EEZM, EI-EZL
ATR 42–300	3	2001	2010	LY-ARI leased from DOT LT; D-BCRP, D-BCRO leased from Avanti Air
Boeing 737-300	2	2016	2016	EI-IGR, EI-IGS on lease
Boeing 737-400	1	2014	2017	9H-AMW on lease
Boeing 737-700	4	2013	2018	
Boeing 737-800	9	2013	2018	
Boeing 767-200	1	2014		I-AIGH<
Boeing 767-300ER	3	2014	2018	
British Aerospace 146-200	7	1991	2005	
British Aerospace 146-300	4	1991	1992	
McDonnell Douglas DC-9-51	6	1991	1999	
McDonnell Douglas MD-82	9	2013	2018	
McDonnell Douglas MD-83	12	1991	2010	

== Gallery ==
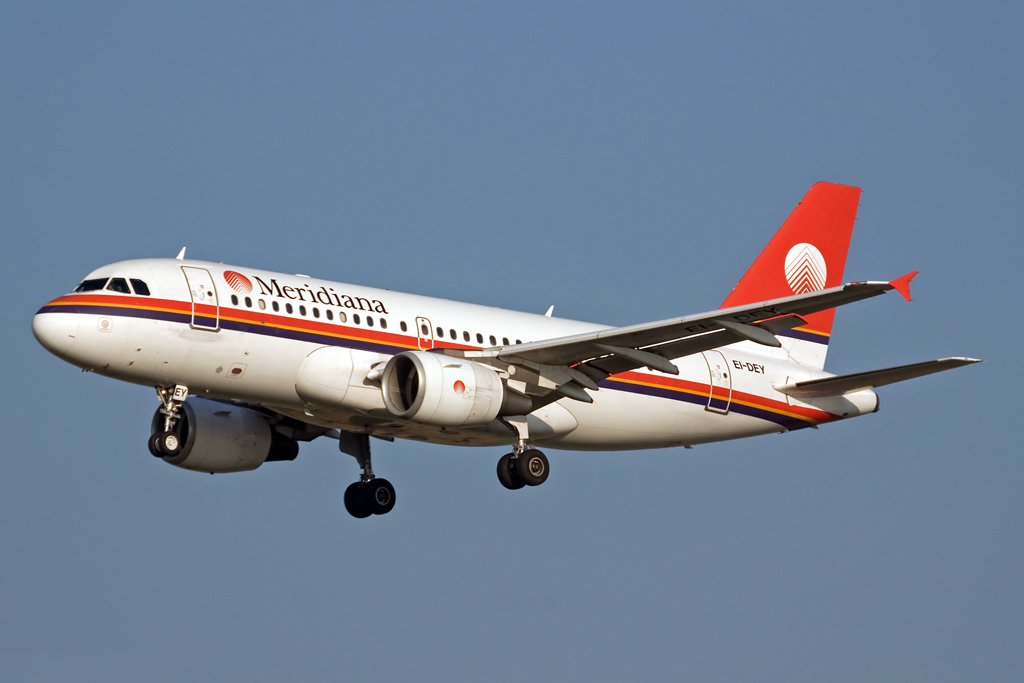
Airbus A319-100

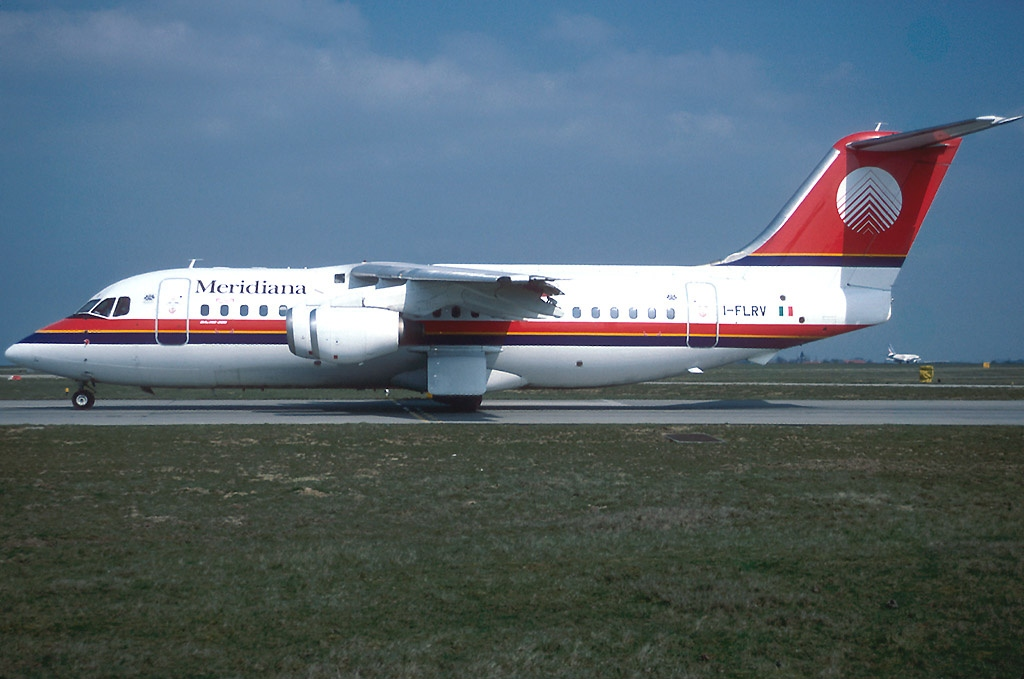
British Aerospace 146-200

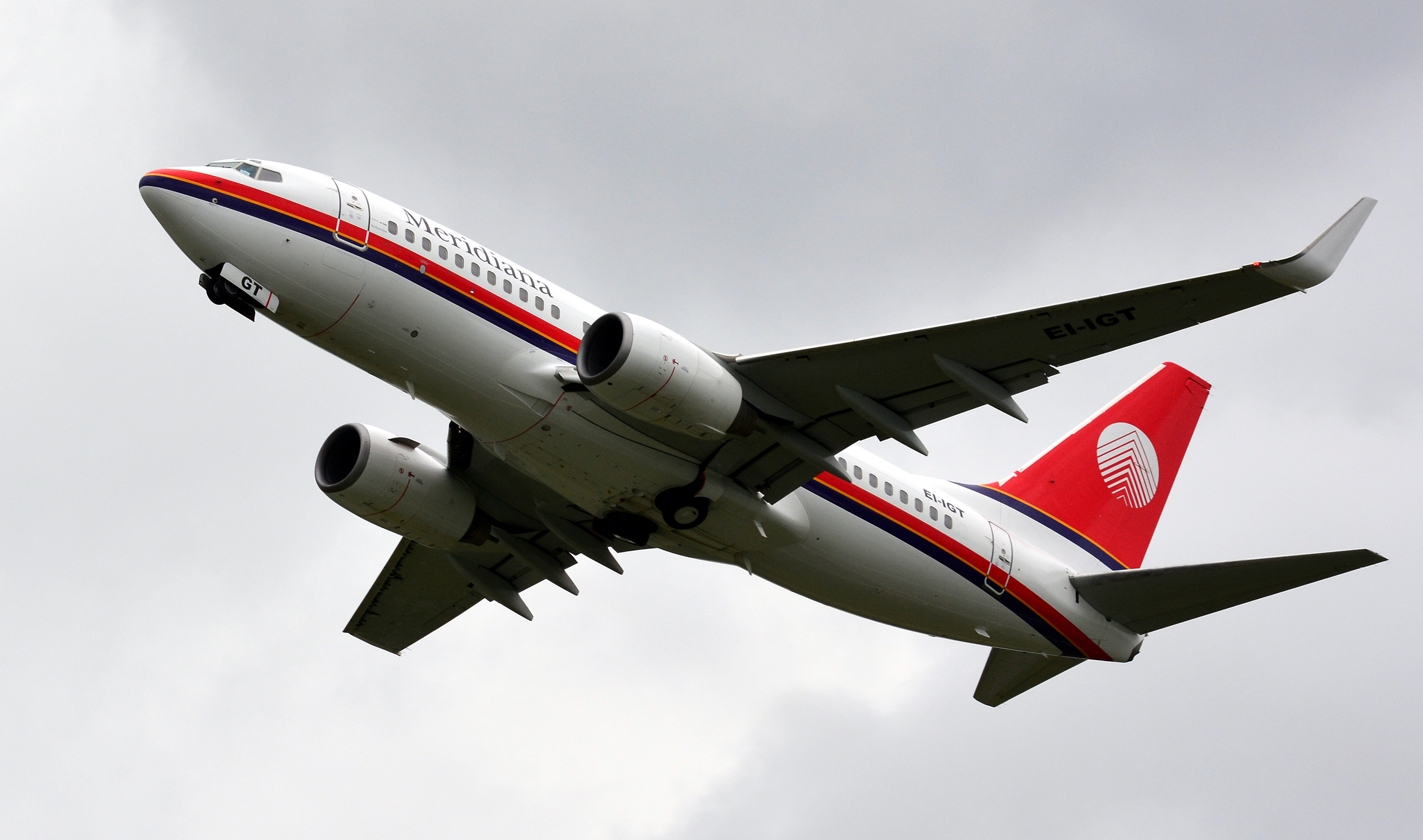
Boeing 737-700

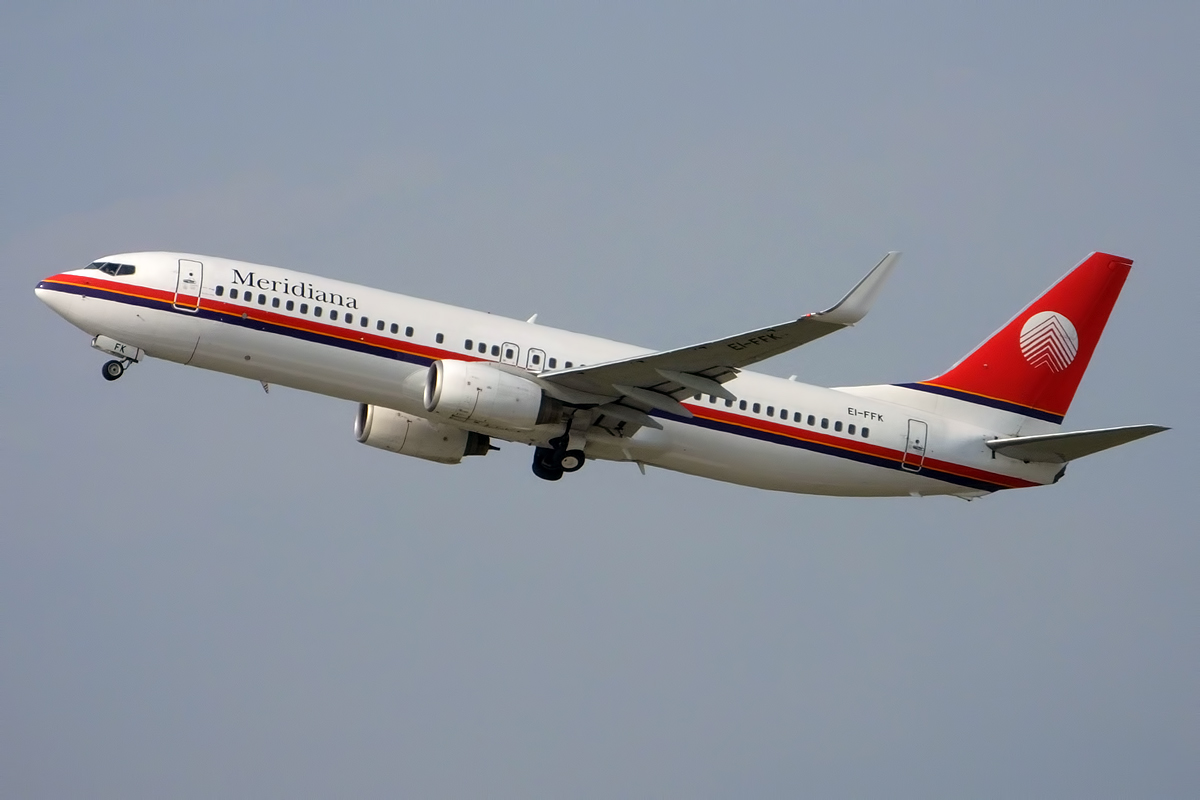
Boeing 737-800

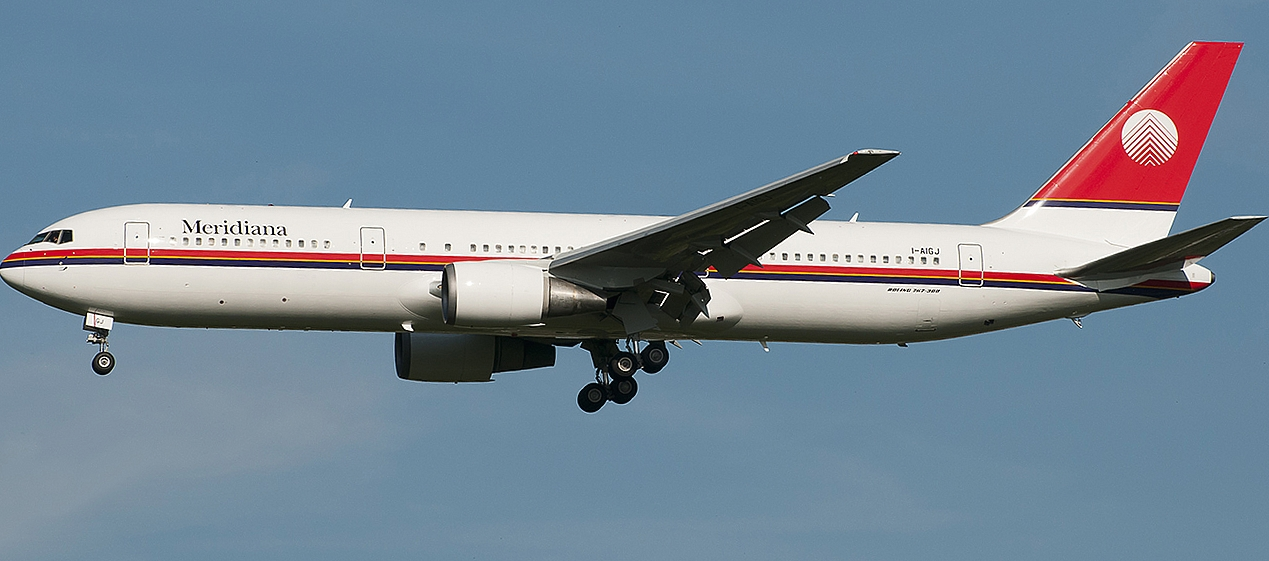
Boeing 767-300ER

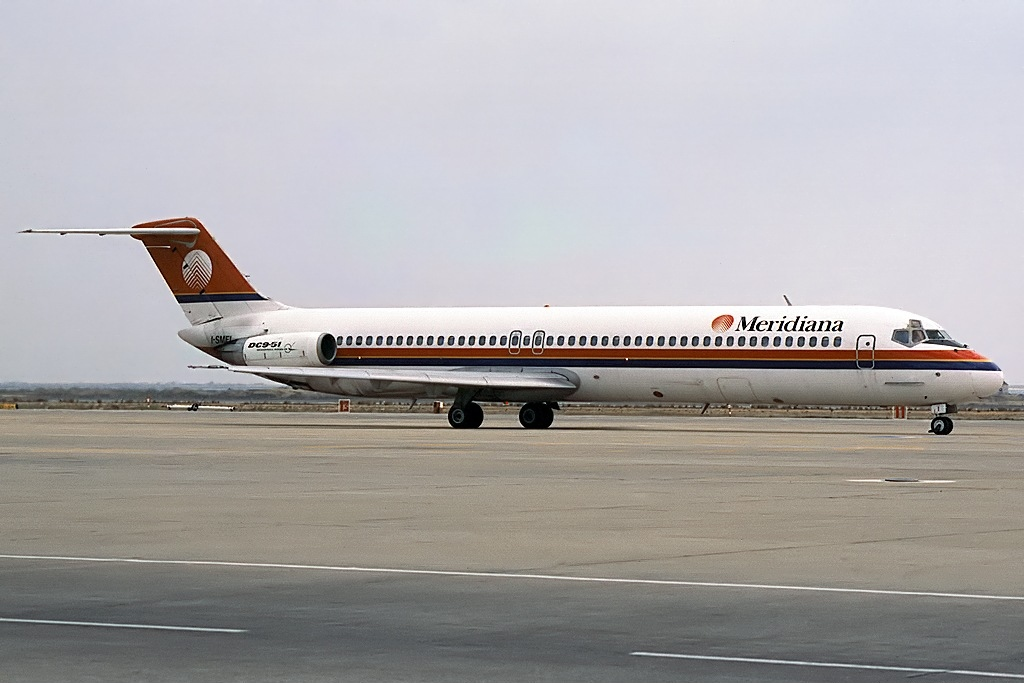
McDonnell Douglas DC-9-50

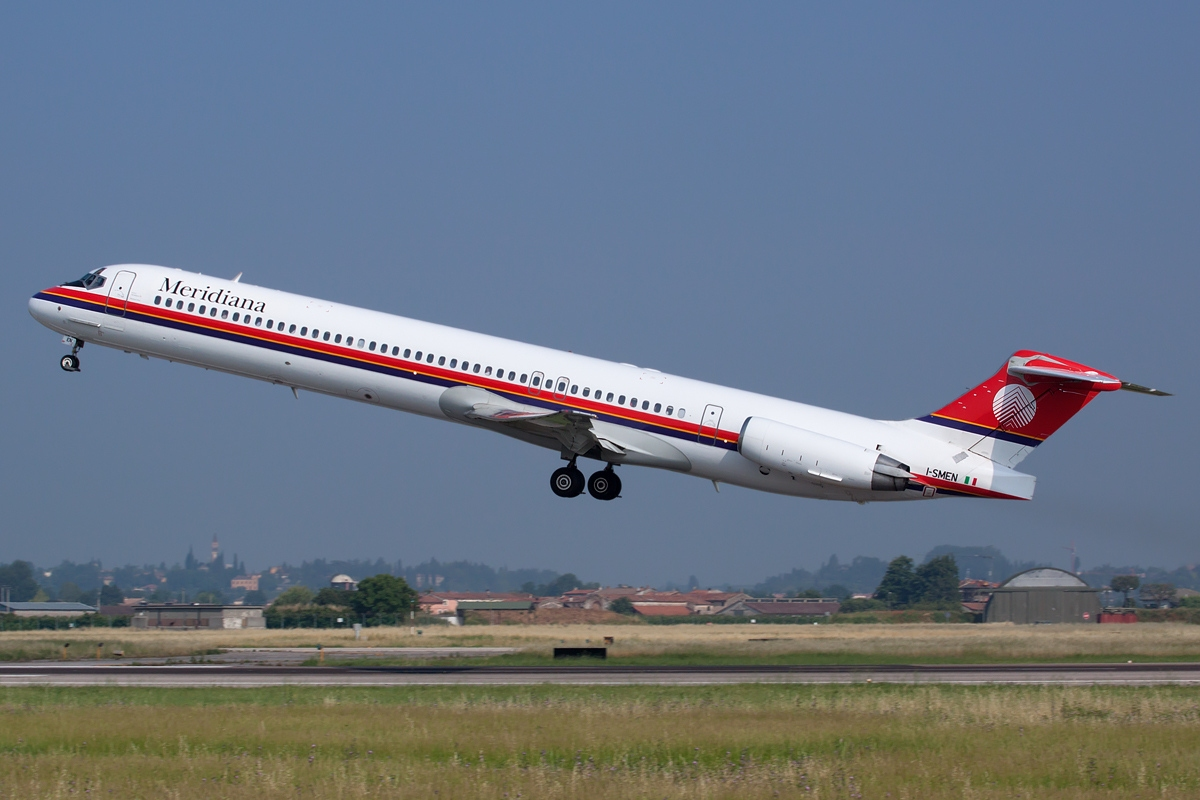
McDonnell Douglas MD-83

== See also ==
- Transport in Italy
- List of companies of Italy
