= Air Italy (2005–2018) =

Italian airline

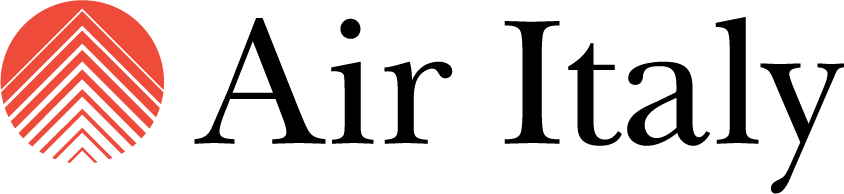

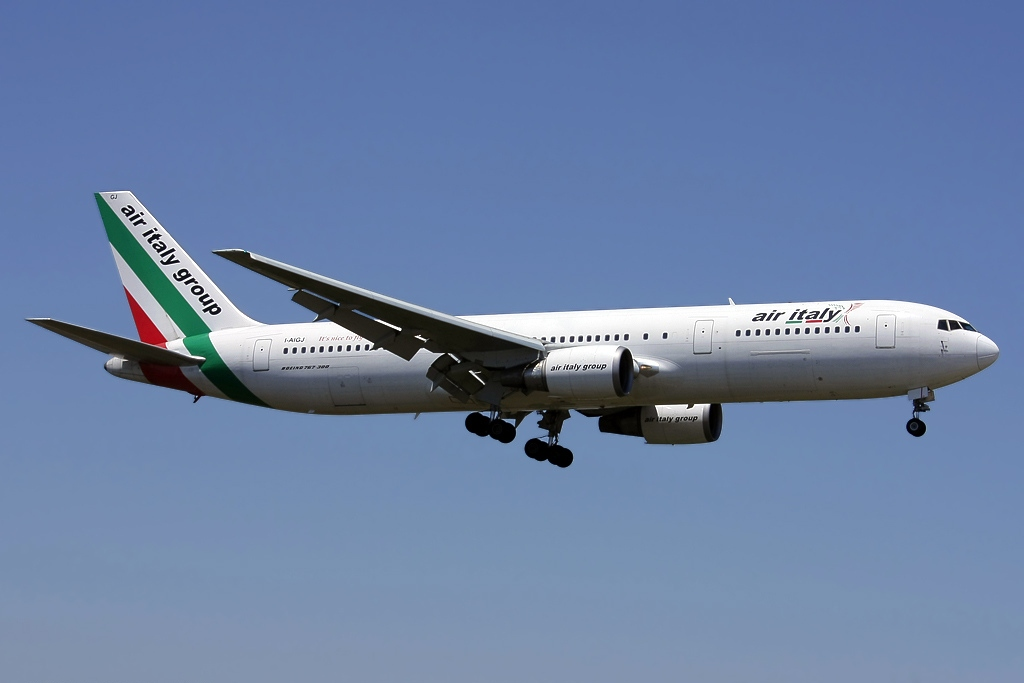
- Boeing 767-300ER
| IATA | ICAO | Call sign |
|---|---|---|
| I9 | AEY | AIR ITALY |
- Founded: 2005; 21 years ago
- Ceased operations: 28 February 2018 (merged with Meridiana to form a new Air Italy)
- AOC #: YXYF237F
- Hubs: Malpensa Airport (Milan)
- Focus cities: Leonardo da Vinci–Fiumicino Airport (Rome); Naples International Airport; Olbia Costa Smeralda Airport
- Frequent-flyer program: Meridiana Club
- Fleet size: 12
- Destinations: 36 Pisa
- Parent company: Meridiana
- Headquarters: Olbia, Sassari, Italy
- Website: meridiana.com

Air Italy S.p.A., operating as Air Italy was an Italian airline, headquartered in Milan. Using wet-leased aircraft from Boeing, it operated from 2005 to 2018, later as the main airline of Air Italy Group together with two other subsidiaries, Air Italy Egypt and Air Italy Polska, which both later ceased operation. After 2011, Air Italy was a fully integrated subsidiary of Meridiana, then known as Meridiana fly, and continued its operation under the Meridiana Brand but keeping its own AOC. On 28 February 2018, Air Italy reorganised with Meridiana to create the new Air Italy under the new ownership of Meridiana's parent company, AQA Holding.

== History ==
=== Early years ===
The airline was set up in 2005 and was originally owned by BV Asset Management (40%), Giuseppe Gentile (40%) and the Pathfinder Corporation (20%). It started operations on 29 May of the same year with an inaugural flight from Turin to Budapest. In late 2006, an independent investment company acquired a 40% share in Air Italy.

The funding of 280 million Euros was used to buy three used Boeing 767 aircraft (one -200ER and two -300ERs) in 2007 and 2008 for services to leisure destinations in Africa, the Indian Ocean and the Caribbean. Most of Air Italy's independent flights left from either Naples Airport, Turin Airport, Verona Airport or Milan Malpensa Airport.

=== Under Meridiana ownership ===
On 18 July 2011, Meridiana, then known as Meridiana fly, announced that it would merge with Air Italy. Since 2013, Air Italy operated entirely on behalf of Meridiana using their corporate design.

On 2 September 2017, it was announced that Qatar Airways had bought 49% of AQA Holding, the new shareholder of Meridiana (Air Italy's parent company). On 7 November 2017, it was announced that Qatar Airways would be merging Meridiana and Air Italy under the Meridiana brand and AOC.

=== Merger and rebranding as Air Italy ===
On 19 February 2018, Meridiana was officially re-branded and merged with Air Italy in a bid to become Italy's flagship carrier under the new Air Italy brand, in place of the bankrupt Alitalia. Eight new aircraft were to be added in 2018, comprising three Boeing 737 MAX 8 and five Airbus A330-200s. Air Italy confirmed a commitment to receive 20 new 737 MAX aircraft from April 2018 over three years, while the A330s would be sourced from Qatar Airways as it replaces its A330 aircraft with 787s. Air Italy planned to operate 50 aircraft by 2022.

== Subsidiaries ==
Air Italy used to maintain two subsidiaries, which have since ceased to exist:

- Air Italy Egypt was created in 2007 under the name Euro Mediterranean Airlines as a subsidiary based in Egypt, which initially operated a single Boeing 757-200 that was later replaced by a Boeing 737-800. In September 2009, Euro Mediterranean Airlines was rebranded as Air Italy Egypt, but by the end of the same year it had vanished due to financial difficulties.
- Air Italy Polska was also established in 2007 to operate leisure flights from Poland. In 2011, it was sold to private investors and renamed Air Poland, but subsequently filed for bankruptcy and shut down in 2012.

== Destinations ==
All of Air Italy's flights were operated on behalf of its parent, Meridiana, under the Meridiana brand.

== Fleet ==
=== Fleet at closure ===
The Air Italy fleet consisted of the following aircraft (as of February 2018):

Air Italy fleet
| Aircraft | In fleet | Orders | Passengers | | | Notes |
| Aircraft | In fleet | Orders | J | Y | Total | Notes |
|---|---|---|---|---|---|---|
| Boeing 737-700 | 1 | — | — | 148 | 148 | Operated for Meridiana |
| Boeing 737-800 | 7 | — | — | 189 | 189 | Operated for Meridiana |
| Boeing 767-200ER | 1 | — | 12 | 241 | 253 | Operated for Meridiana |
| Boeing 767-300ER | 3 | — | 18 | 258 | 276 | Operated for Meridiana |
| Total | 12 | — | | | | |

=== Historical fleet ===
The airline previously operated the following aircraft as of August 2016:

- 1 Boeing 757-200
- 2 Boeing 737-300
- 2 further Boeing 737-700

== Gallery ==
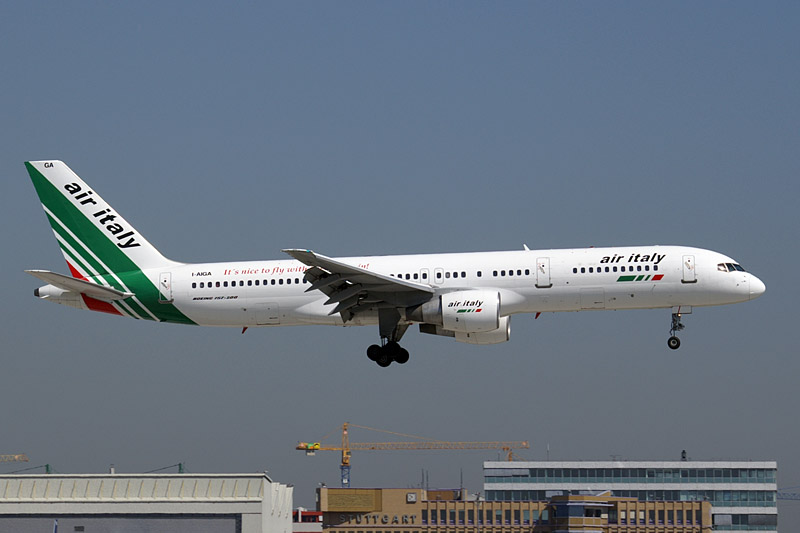
Boeing 757-200 in the first colours

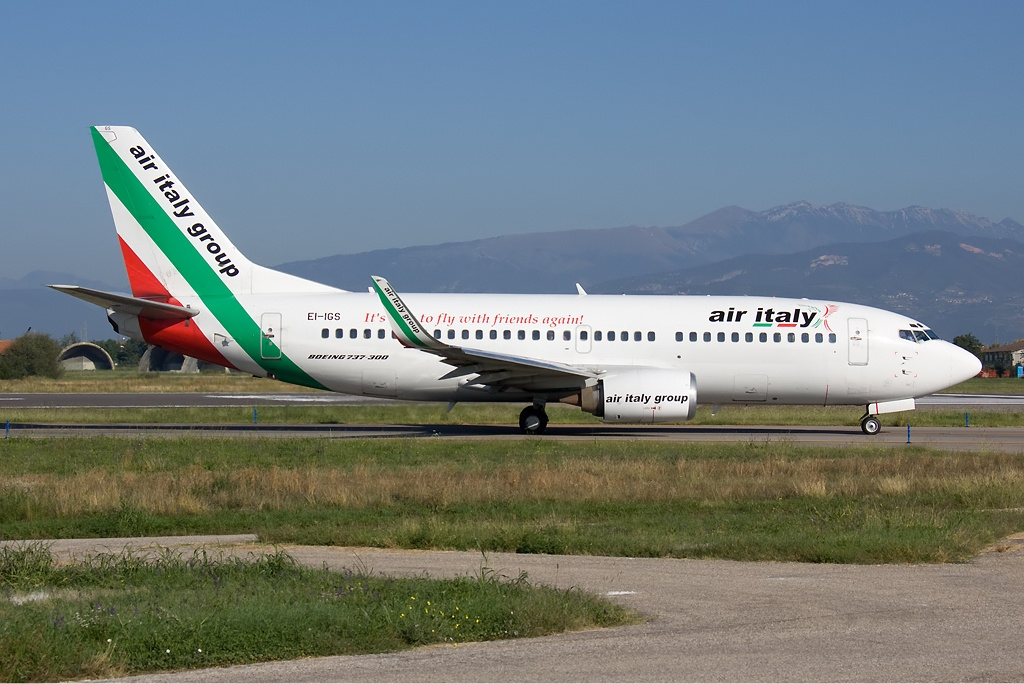
Boeing 737-300

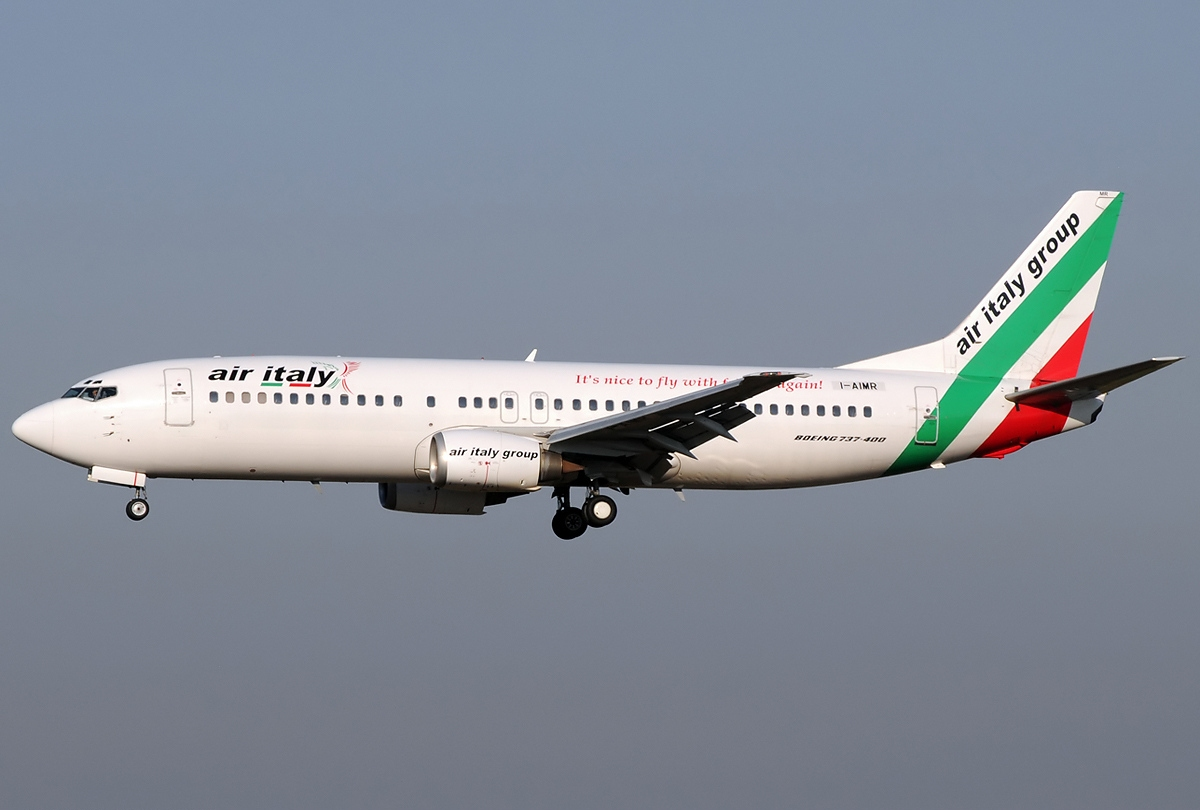
Boeing 737-400

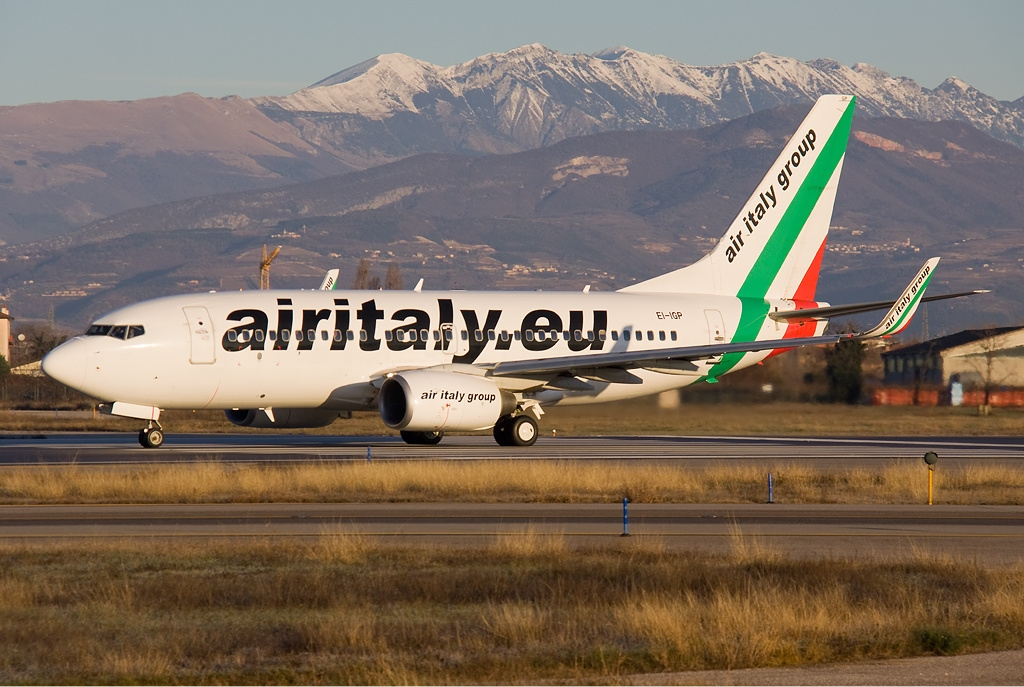
Boeing 737-700

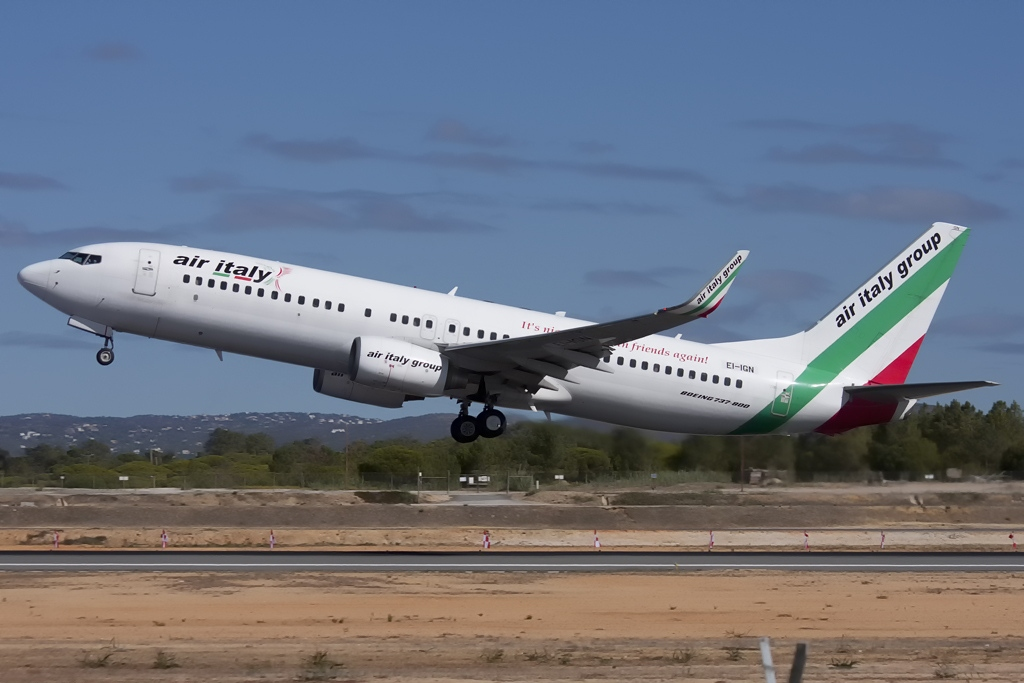
Boeing 737-800

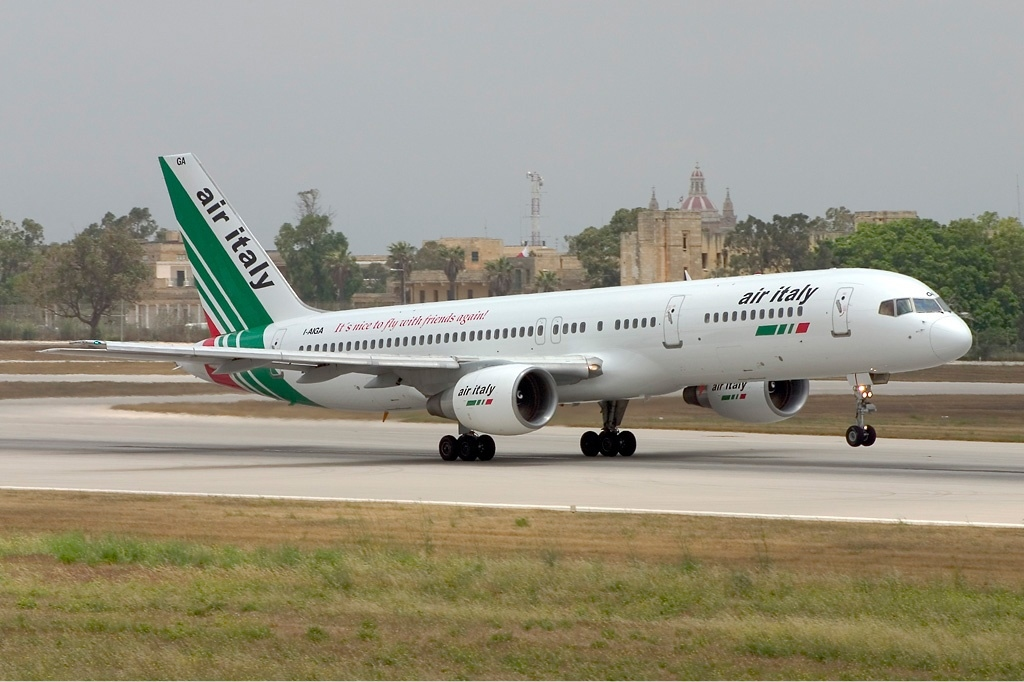
Boeing 757-200

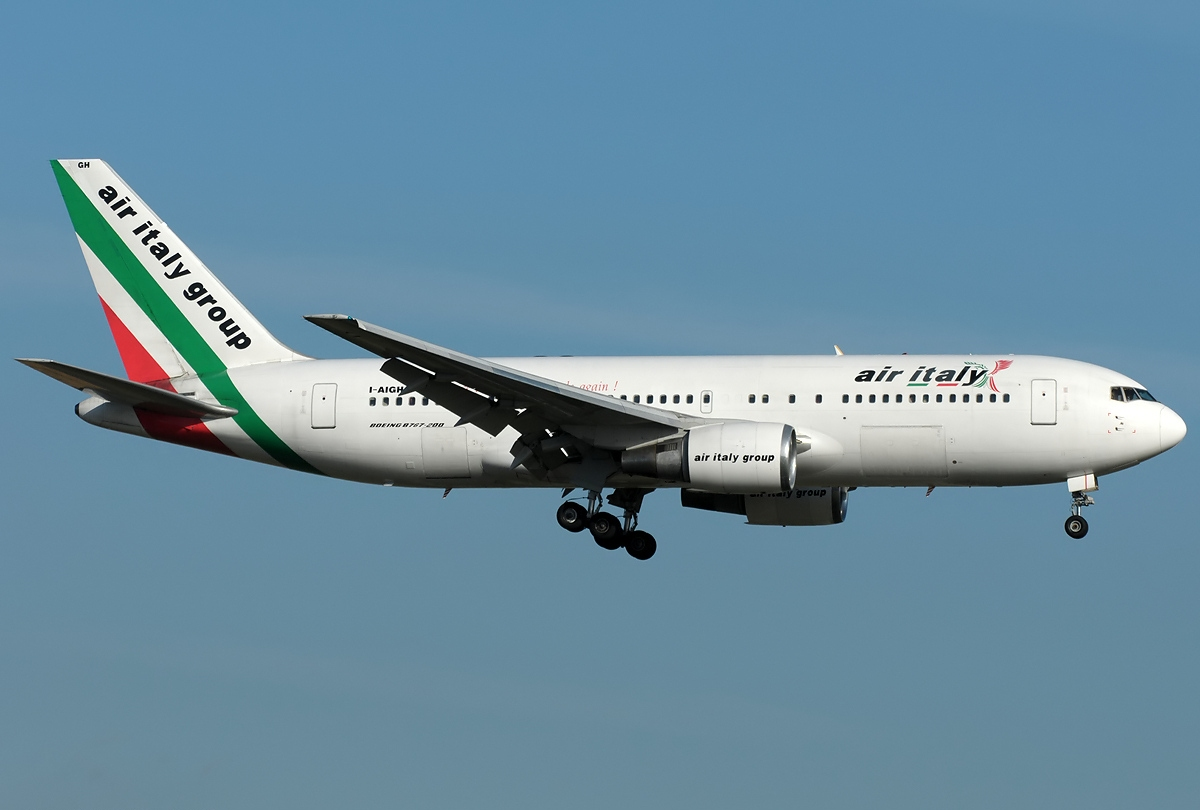
Boeing 767-200ER

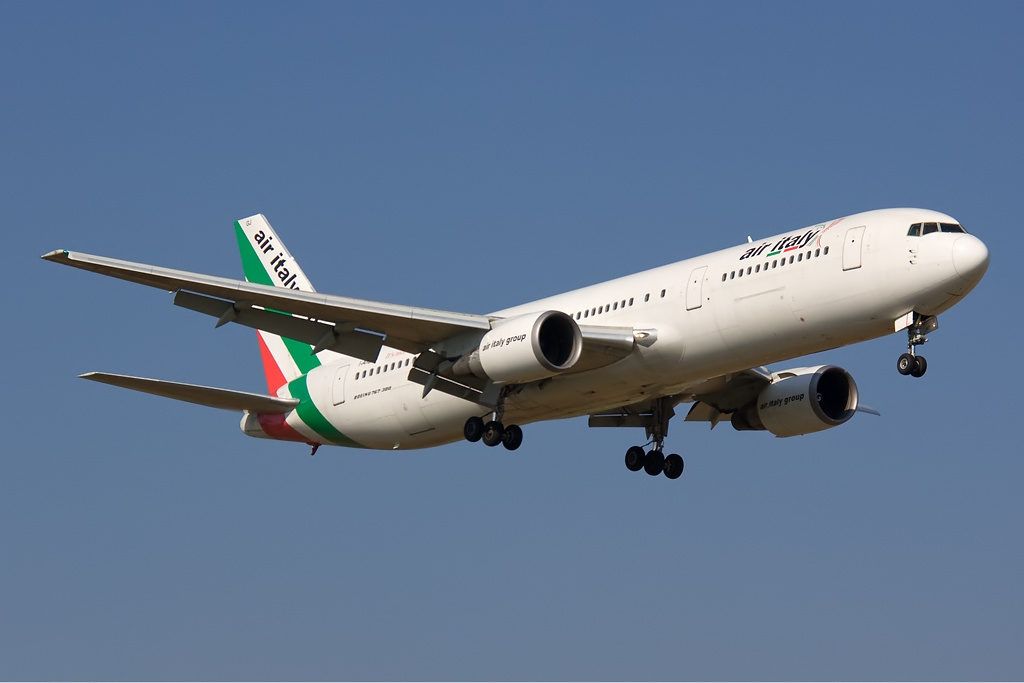
Boeing 767-300ER

== See also ==
- List of defunct airlines of Italy
