= Eurofly =

Italian airline

IATA	ICAO	Call sign
GJ	EEZ	E-FLY
- Founded: 26 May 1989
- Ceased operations: 28 February 2010 (merged with Meridiana to create Meridiana Fly)
- Operating bases: Bologna; Milan–Malpensa; Rome–Fiumicino
- Fleet size: 41
- Destinations: 41 (combined figure for Meridiana and Eurofly)
- Headquarters: Milan, Italy
- Website: eurofly.it/EN/index.asp

Eurofly was a privately owned airline based in Milan, Italy. Listed on MTA Stock Exchange and controlled by Meridiana, it was Italy's leading carrier in the leisure flights market and mainly operated international, medium to long haul, point-to-point flights.

The medium-haul activity was centered mainly on operations to Egypt and the Red Sea Riviera, Spain and Greece. The long haul included some of Italians’ preferred tropical destinations like the Maldives and Sri Lanka or Africa. Furthermore, during the summer season, Eurofly operated non-stop scheduled flights to New York City, exploiting the reverse seasonality of if compared to tropical destinations and focusing on incoming traffic to Italy. The company slogan was The Italian [air]way of life.

In 2010, the airline merged with Meridiana to form Meridiana Fly.

== History ==
The airline was established on 26 May 1989 with the aim of selling medium-haul flights to tour operators. Eurofly started its operations on 26 February 1990. It was set up with a 45% shareholding by Alitalia in response to the needs of the flag carrier to develop the leisure travel market. The original shareholding was divided between Alitalia (45%), Olivetti (45%) and San Paolo Finance (10%).

In 2003, Alitalia sold an 80% stake in the airline for $10.8m to Luxembourg based private equity fund Spinnaker, controlled by Italian bank Banco Profilo.

In January 2004, Eurofly was acquired wholly by the Spinnker fund, managed by Sandro Capotosti (CEO and Founder of Banca Prolilo) and Paolo G. Alberoni. The fund listed Eurofly on the Milan Stock Exchange in December 2005. At the end of 2006, Spinnaker sold the residual 29.95% stake in Eurofly to Meridiana and Mr Giovanni Rossi (CEO of Meridiana) took over as CEO of Eurofly.

In January 2008, two capital increases took place and Meridiana participation in Eurofly's capital grew to 46.1%. On 28 February 2010, Meridiana and Eurofly merged to create Italy's second-biggest airline, Meridiana fly.

== Destinations ==
Before eurofly was acquired by Meridiana, the airline had 2 codeshare agreements with Air One and British Airways.

== Fleet ==
Eurofly operated the following types:

Fleet
Aircraft	Total	Image	Introduced	Retired	Remark
Airbus A319-115(LR)	1		2005	2007	leased
Airbus A320-214	16		2001	2010	some transferred from Alitalia
Airbus A330-200	5		2002	2010	transferred from Alitalia
Boeing 737-400	1		1999	2000	leased from Pegasus Airlines
Boeing 767-300ER	3		1998	2002	leased from lessors
McDonnell Douglas DC-9-32	2		1992	1994	leased from ATI
McDonnell Douglas DC-9-51	2		1989	2001	in leasing
McDonnell Douglas MD-82	14		1986	2005	3 transferred from Alitalia
McDonnell Douglas MD-83	6		1994	2004	all transferred from Alitalia

== See also ==
- List of defunct airlines of Italy
