= Olbia Costa Smeralda Airport =

International Airport in Sardinia, Italy

Olbia-Costa Smeralda-Prince Karim Aga Khan IV Airport Olbia-Costa Smeralda-Prince Karim Aga Khan IV Airport

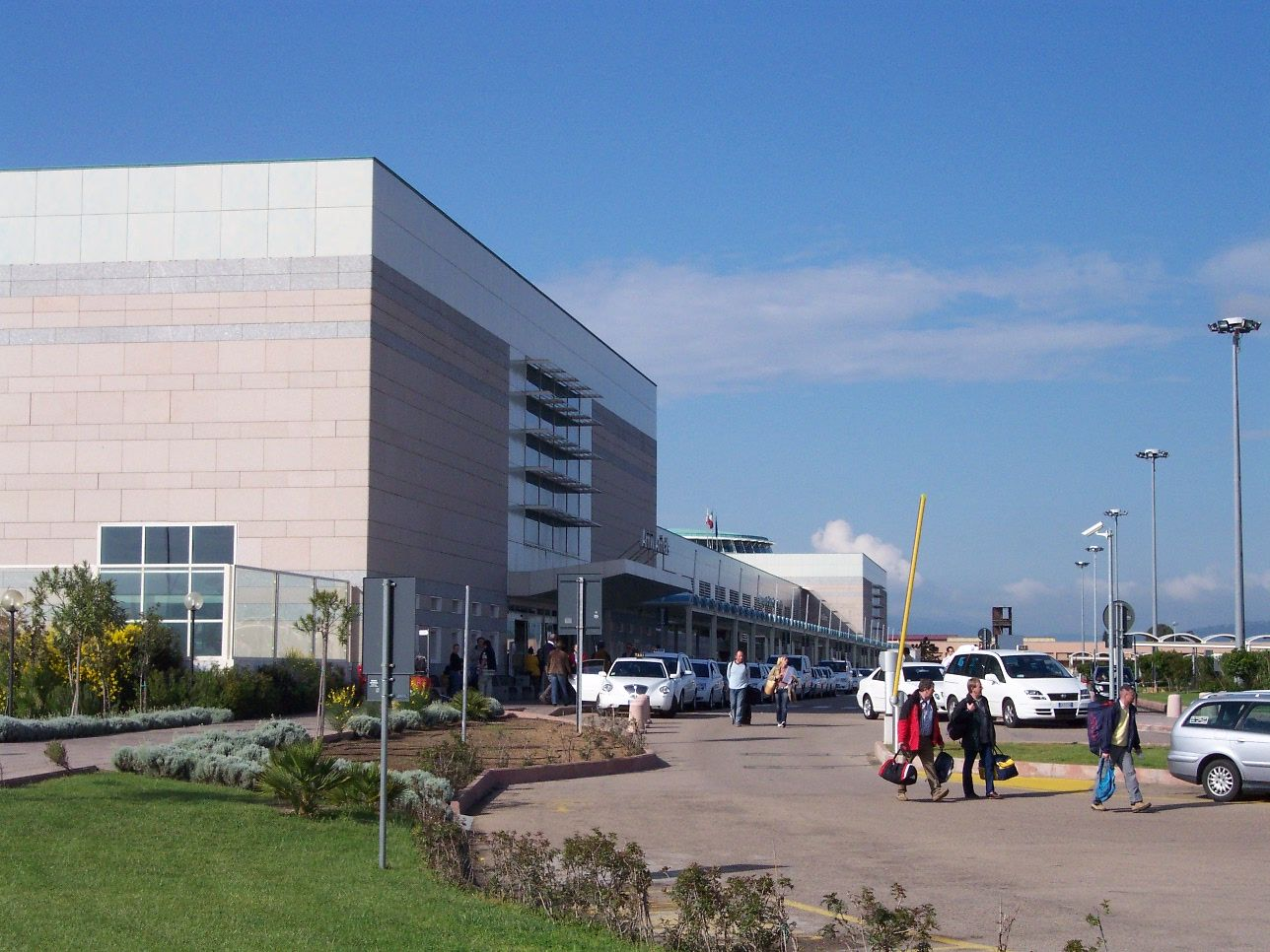
- IATA: OLB; ICAO: LIEO

Summary
- Airport type: Public
- Owner/Operator: Geasar S.p.A.
- Serves: Olbia
- Location: Olbia, Italy
- Elevation AMSL: 37 ft (11 m)
- Coordinates: 40°53′09″N 09°31′01″E
- Website: geasar.it

Map
- Location of airport in Sardinia OLB (Italy)

Runways
Direction	Length		Surface
Direction	m	ft	Surface
05/23	2,745	9,006	Concrete / asphalt

Statistics (2024)
- Passengers: 3,883,235
- Passenger change 23-24: ▲18.3%
- Aircraft movements: 42,313
- Movements change 23-24: ▲10.3%
- Cargo (tons): 1,322.4
- Cargo change 23-24: ▲46.4%
- Source: Italian AIP at EUROCONTROL; Statistics from Assaeroporti

Olbia-Costa Smeralda-Prince Karim Aga Khan IV Airport (Italian: Aeroporto di Olbia-Costa Smeralda) (IATA: OLB, ICAO: LIEO) is an airport in Olbia, Sardinia, Italy. It was the primary operating base for Italian airline Air Italy whose headquarters were located at the airport. It mostly handles seasonal holiday flights from destinations in Europe and is managed by Geasar S.p.A.

Originally "Olbia Costa Smeralda Airport", was renamed in 2025 to Olbia-Costa Smeralda-Prince Karim Aga Khan IV Airport after the death of Karim Aga Khan IV on 4 February 2025.

== History ==
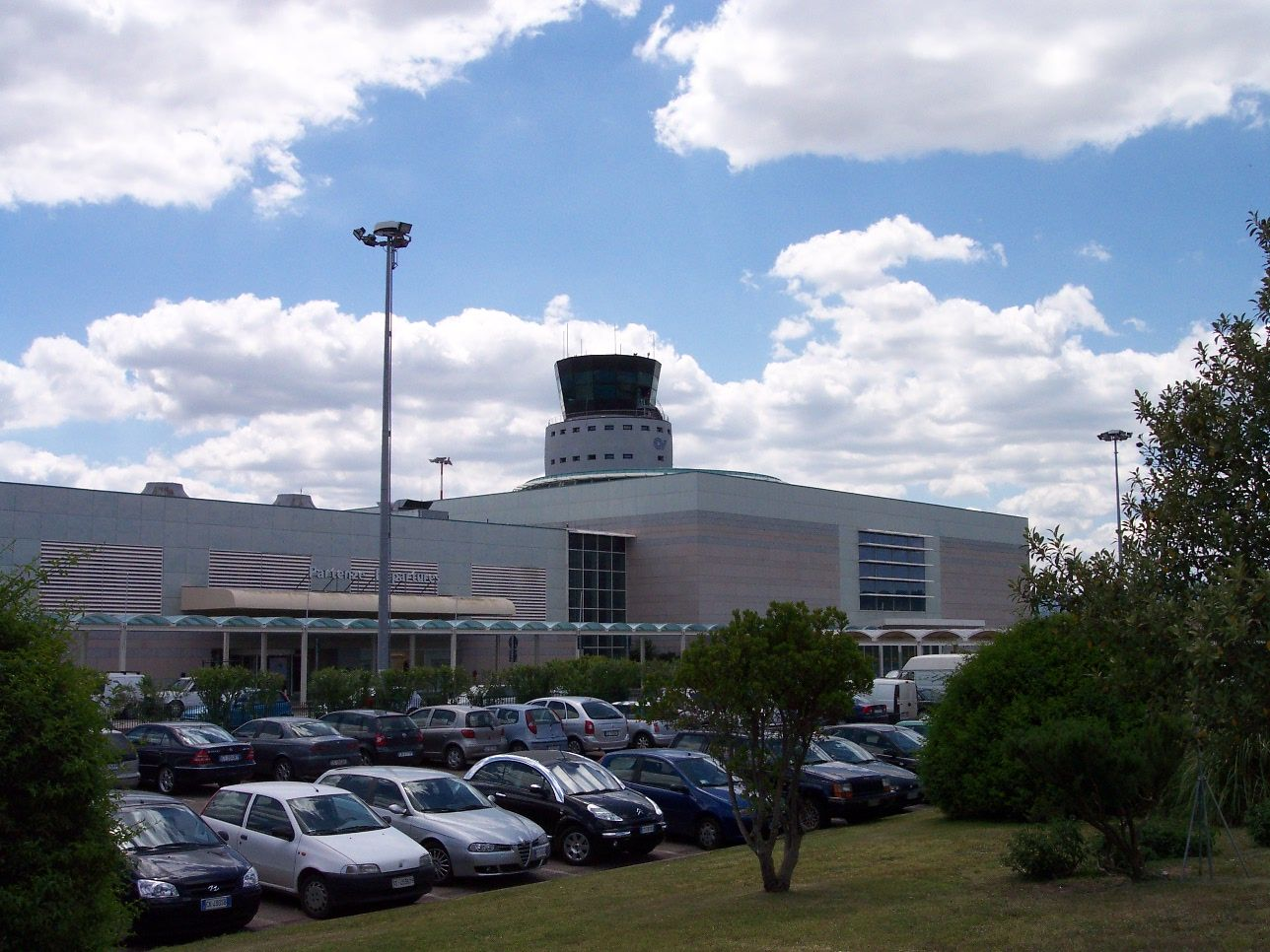
Terminal building and control tower

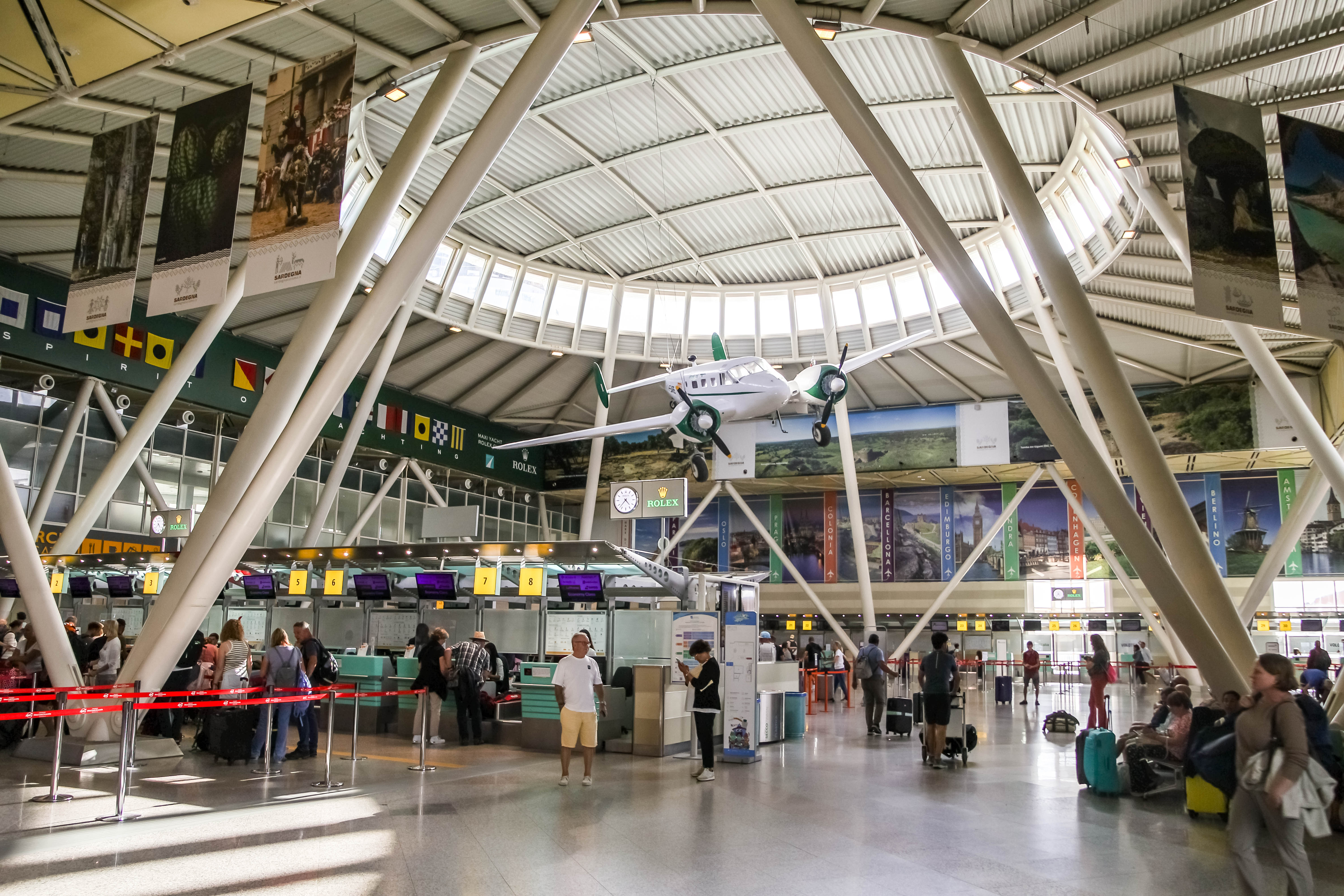
Airport check-in

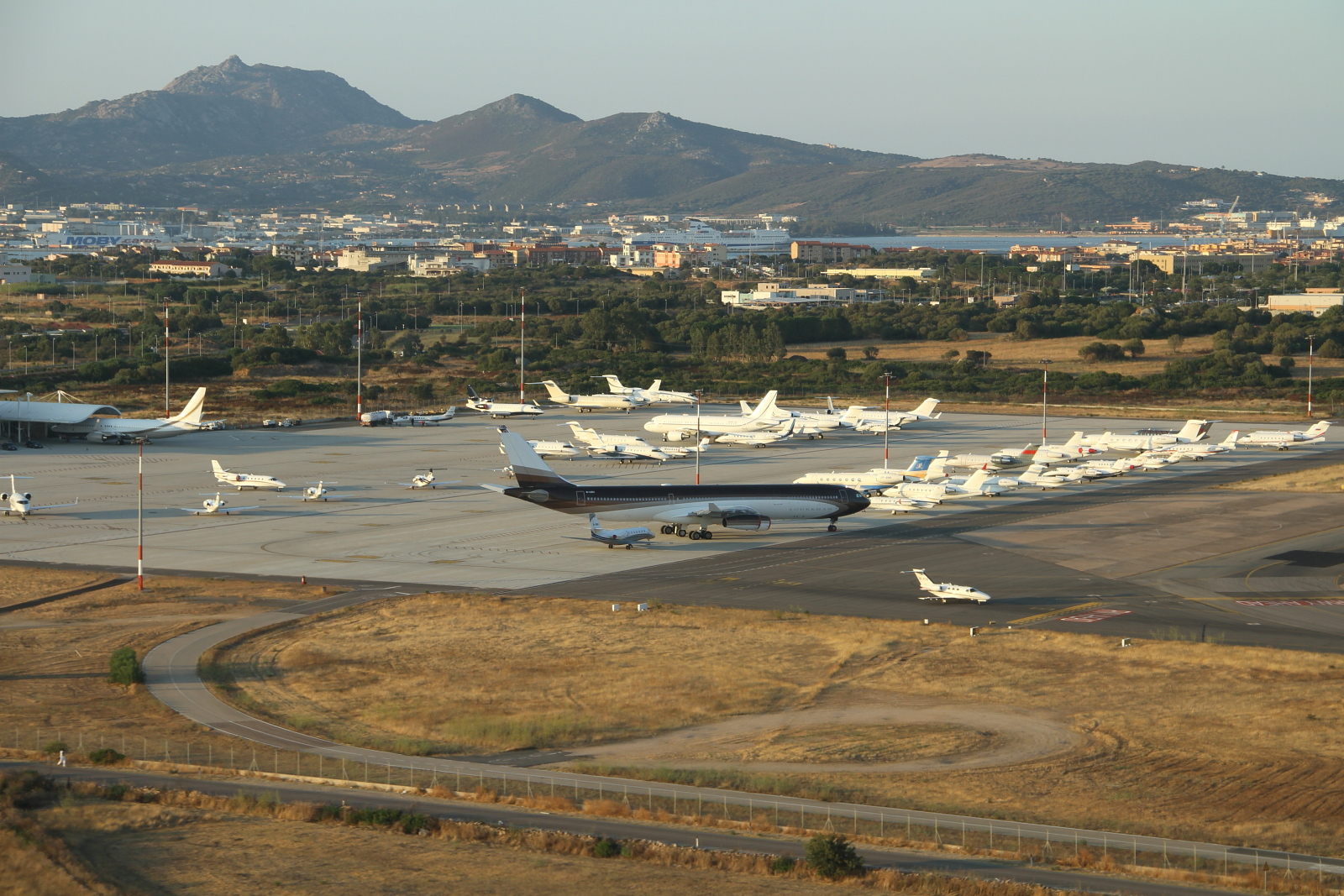
General aviation apron

A military airfield was opened at Olbia (then Terranova Pausania) in 1921, and a seaplane base was inaugurated close to the Isola Bianca harbour in 1927, although poor loads from the island on the flights to Ostia and Cagliari led to the service's stop in Terranova being discontinued in 1929. The airfield and seaplane base were targeted by Allied bombing in World War II, and the Germans opened Venafiorita airfield 7.2 kilometres (4.5 mi) south of the town. It was renamed Olbia in 1945.

Commercial flights gradually returned, and in 1963, the Olbia-based airline Alisarda was formed. It successfully expanded its route network, introducing jet flights in 1972, and it was renamed Meridiana in 1991. However, the introduction of jet aircraft necessitated the building of a larger airport nearer the city; the current airport was completed in 1974.

Following three years of work, a new terminal covering 42,000 square metres and capable of handling 4.5 million passengers per year, was unveiled on 6 June 2004. Costing a total of €81 million, the structure was designed by Willem Brouwer Architects and incorporated the original terminal building, which was developed into a 3000-square metre retail area. The new building has 40 check-in desks and fifteen boarding gates: five are equipped with jet bridges (Gates A1-A5) for Schengen passengers on full service carriers like Lufthansa or Air France, and occasionally by low cost airlines like Volotea or Vueling; one walking gate A6; and three non-Schengen bus gates (A7-A10) used by airlines like British Airways or Easyjet. Five further bus gates (B1-B6) exist on the lower floor for Schengen departures; these are used by ultra low cost carriers like Ryanair. The terminal contains a wide variety of shops and restaurants, a wine bar, a small art gallery, and indoor garden areas featuring local flora.

The airport also is home to the Tourist Management department of the University of Sassari.

From 3 February to 14 March 2020, the airport closed to passenger air traffic for the refurbishment and extension of the taxiways and runway. During this period, all flights arriving and departing were cancelled. The airport building remained in this period open to events of various kinds. The airport, which was initially scheduled to reopen on March 14, 2020, remained closed until June 2, as a result of the measures taken by the Italian authorities due to the COVID-19 pandemic in Italy. The airport reopened on June 3.

== Airlines and destinations ==
The following airlines operate regular scheduled and charter flights to and from Olbia:

Airlines	Destinations
Aegean Airlines	Seasonal: Athens
Aeroitalia	Milan–Linate, Rome–Fiumicino; Seasonal: Cuneo Genoa, Parma, Perugia
Air Corsica	Seasonal: Figari
Air Dolomiti	Seasonal: Munich
Air France	Seasonal: Paris–Charles de Gaulle
airBaltic	Seasonal: Riga
Animawings	Seasonal: Cluj-Napoca, Timișoara
Austrian Airlines	Seasonal: Vienna
British Airways	Seasonal: London–City, London–Heathrow, London–Stansted; Seasonal charter: Jersey (begins 22 May 2026)
Bulgaria Air	Seasonal charter: Sofia
Condor	Seasonal: Düsseldorf, Frankfurt, Munich
Delta Air Lines	Seasonal: New York–JFK
easyJet	Milan–Malpensa; Seasonal: Amsterdam, Basel/Mulhouse, Berlin, Bordeaux, Bristol, Edinburgh, Geneva, London–Gatwick, London–Luton, Lyon, Nantes, Naples, Nice, Paris–Orly, Zürich
Edelweiss Air	Seasonal: Zürich
Enter Air	Seasonal: Palermo
Eurowings	Seasonal: Berlin Cologne/Bonn, Düsseldorf, Graz, Hamburg, Hannover, Salzburg, Stuttgart
flydubai	Dubai
Iberia	Seasonal: Madrid
ITA Airways	Seasonal: Genoa,Turin
Jet2.com	Seasonal: Birmingham, London–Stansted, Manchester
Lufthansa	Seasonal: Frankfurt, Munich
Marabu	Seasonal: Nuremberg
Neos	Seasonal: Bologna, Milan–Malpensa, Verona
Norwegian Air Shuttle	Seasonal: Copenhagen, Oslo, Stockholm–Arlanda
Ryanair	Bologna, Milan-Bergamo, Trieste; Seasonal: Brussels-Charleroi, Copenhagen, Dublin, Kraków, London–Stansted, Paris-Beauvais, Vienna
Scandinavian Airlines	Seasonal: Copenhagen
SkyAlps	Seasonal: Bolzano
Smartwings	Seasonal: Prague; Seasonal charter: Bratislava
Swiss International Air Lines	Seasonal: Geneva
Transavia	Seasonal: Amsterdam, Eindhoven, Paris–Orly
TUI Airways	Seasonal: London–Gatwick, Manchester
TUI fly Deutschland	Seasonal: Hannover (begins 3 May 2027)
United Airlines	Seasonal: Newark (begins 28 May 2027)
Volotea	Bologna, Rome–Fiumicino, Turin, Verona; Seasonal: Ancona, Barcelona, Bordeaux, Brest, Deauville, Florence, Lille, Lyon, Madrid, Marseille, Milan-Bergamo, Nantes, Naples, Paris–Orly, Pisa, Seville, Strasbourg, Toulouse, Venice
Vueling	Seasonal: Barcelona
Wizz Air	Seasonal: Milan–Malpensa, Rome–Ciampino, Warsaw-Chopin

== Ground transportation ==
=== By car ===
The airport is connected to local motorways SS125 and SS729.

=== By bus ===
The following bus services operate to/from the airport.

==== Local buses ====
Local operator ASPO Olbia operates two routes to/from the airport:

- 2 Airport-Sa Minda Noa
- 10 Airport-Town Centre-Airport

==== Regional and long distance buses ====
- 514 Olbia-Olbia Airport-Siniscola-Nuoro
- 601 Santa Teresa di Gallura-Palau-Arzachena-San Pantaleo-Olbia-Olbia Airport
- Cala Gonone-Dorgali-Orosei-La Caletta-Olbia Airport
- Nuoro-Siniscola-Budoni-San Teodoro-Olbia Airport
- 20 Olbia Airport-Olbia-Porto Cervo-Baja Sardinia-Hotel Stelle Marine (Costa Smeralda Shuttle)
- 30 Olbia Airport-Olbia-Calangius-Castelsardo-Porto Torres
- 90 Alghero-Alghero Fertilia Airport-Sassari-Olbia Airport-Olbia
- Olbia Airport-Olbia-Arzachena-Palau-Santa Teresa di Gallura
- Olbia-Telti
- Cagliari-Oristano-Abbasanta-Nuoro-Siniscola-San Teodoro-Olbia Airport-Olbia-Arzachena-Palau-Santa Teresa di Gallura
