= Alisarda =

Italian airline (1963-1991)

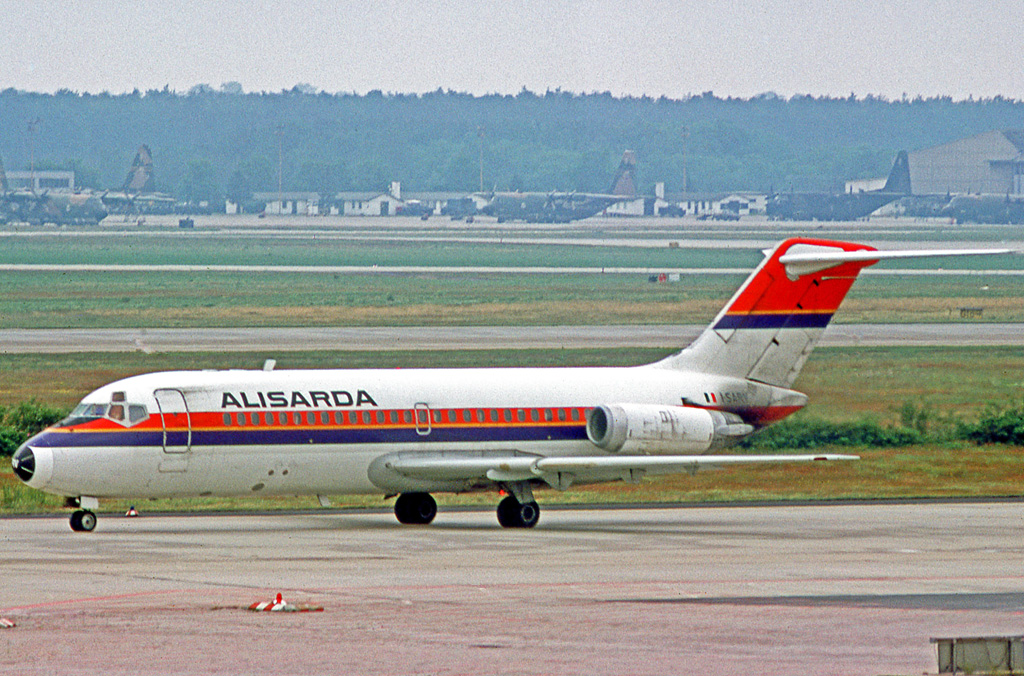
- Douglas DC-9-14
IATA	ICAO	Call sign
IG	ISS	ALISARDA
- Founded: March 1963
- Commenced operations: May 1966
- Ceased operations: 1991 (Renamed Meridiana)
- Operating bases: Olbia, Italy

Alisarda S.p.A., operating as Alisarda, was an Italian airline based in Olbia, Sardinia that operated between 1963 and 1991 before it merged with Universair to become Meridiana. As of 2019, Alisarda S.p.A. is a holding company with a 51% stake in Meridiana successor airline Air Italy.

== History ==
Alisarda 1973 logo

Alisarda was founded by the Aga Khan in March 1963 as an air taxi and charter company to serve the Costa Smeralda. Scheduled operations began in May 1966. The airline used Nord 262 aircraft between Olbia and Rome. These were replaced in 1969 by the Fokker F27 Friendship and with those aircraft, routes to Pisa, Bologna and Cagliari were commenced. The next aircraft type to be introduced was the Douglas DC-9-14 twin-jet airliner with which charter flights to Germany were started. By 1975 the fleet was wholly composed of DC-9s. In the early 1980s it was an associate company of Consorzio Della Costa Smeralda in which Prince Karim Aga Khan had a majority shareholding.

In 1986, Alisarda took 50% ownership of the newly created Avianova. In mid-1987, the carrier took delivery of a second MD-82 and a third aircraft of the type was ordered.

At March 1990, the number of employees was approximately 1,000 and the president was Sergio Peralda. At this time, the airline was owned by a number of financial groups in which Prince Karim Aga Khan had a major interest. The fleet consisted of six McDonnell Douglas DC-9-51s and five MD-82s. Scheduled services were flown to Bologna, Cagliari, Genoa, Milan, Naples, Olbia, Pisa, Rome and Verona, and Frankfurt, Geneva, Munich, Nice, Paris, Turin and Zurich were served on a seasonal basis.

In 1991, Alisarda took over the Spanish airline Universair and merged it to form Meridiana S.A. As of 2019, Alisarda is a holding company with a 51% stake in the Meridiana successor airline Air Italy.

== Fleet ==
in its 27 years of activity, Alisarda operated the following aircraft:

Aircraft	Total	In operation	Retired	Remarks
Beechcraft C-45G	2	1964	1965	
Beechcraft Queen Air 80	2	1965	1967	
Nord 262	2	1966	1971	
Fokker F27	3	1969	1978	
Douglas DC 9 serie 14	2	1974	1980	
Douglas DC 9 serie 32	2	1981	1984	
Douglas DC 9 serie 51	7	1984	1991	1 leased from Finnair
McDonnell-Douglas MD.80	5	1987	1991	4 serie 82 including a leased 1, 1 serie 83
BAe.146-200	3	1991	1991	delivered shortly before name change to Meridiana
SE-210 Caravelle	1	1977	1977	leased from Sterling Airways

== Gallery ==
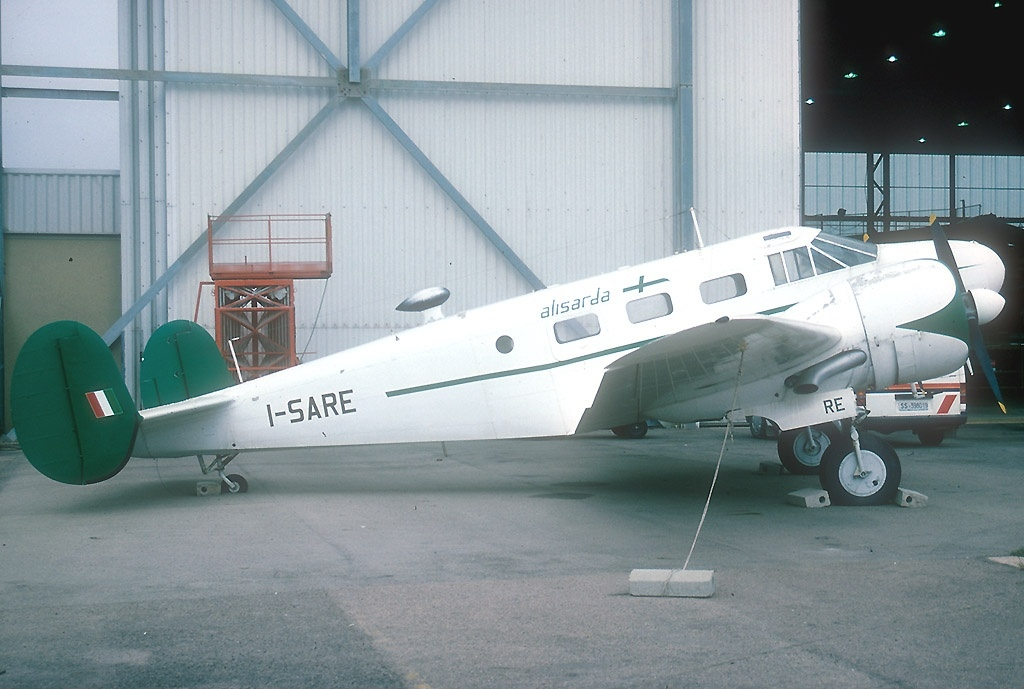
Beech C-45F Expeditor preserved at Olbia Costa Smeralda airport

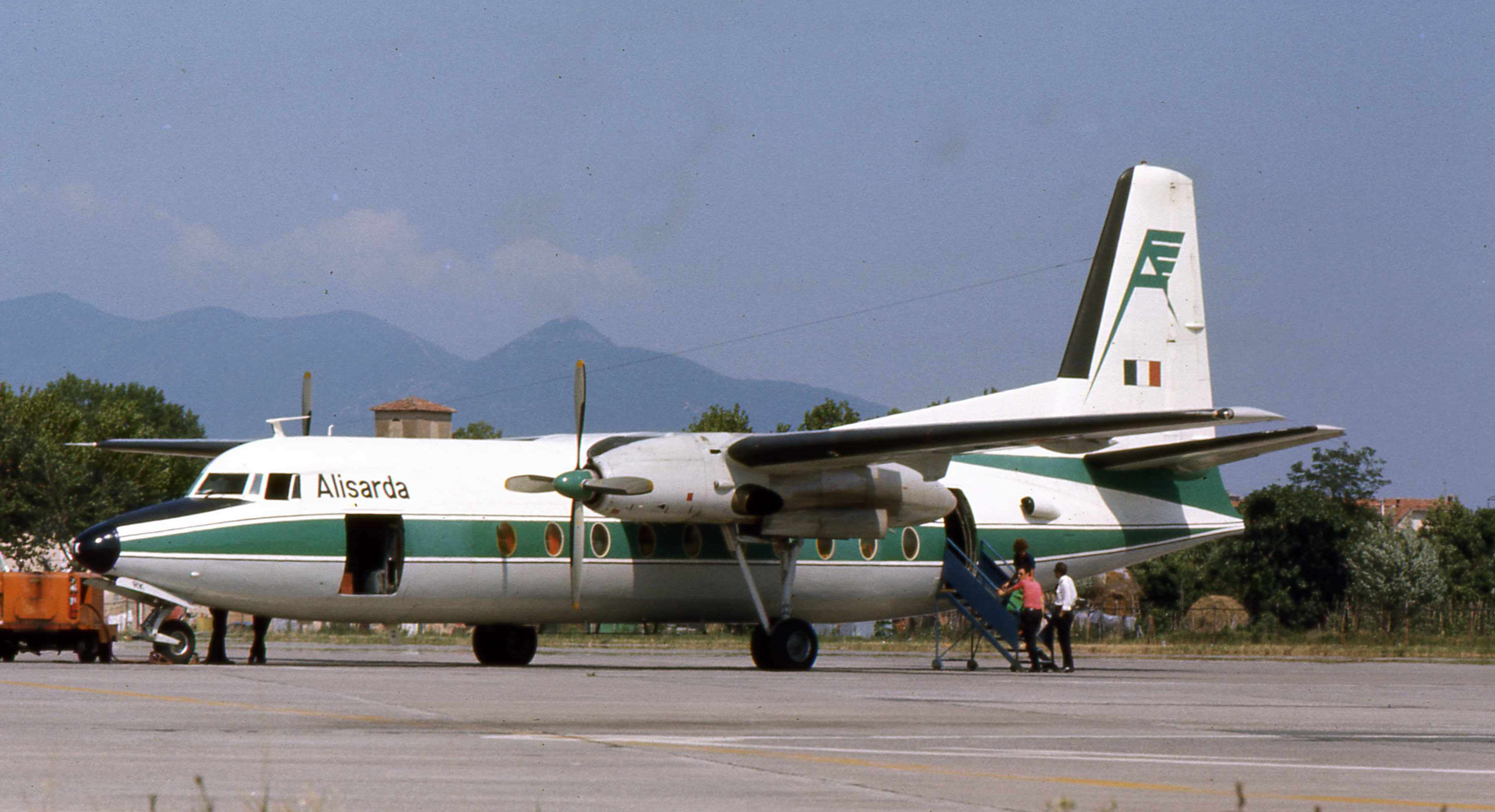
Fokker F27

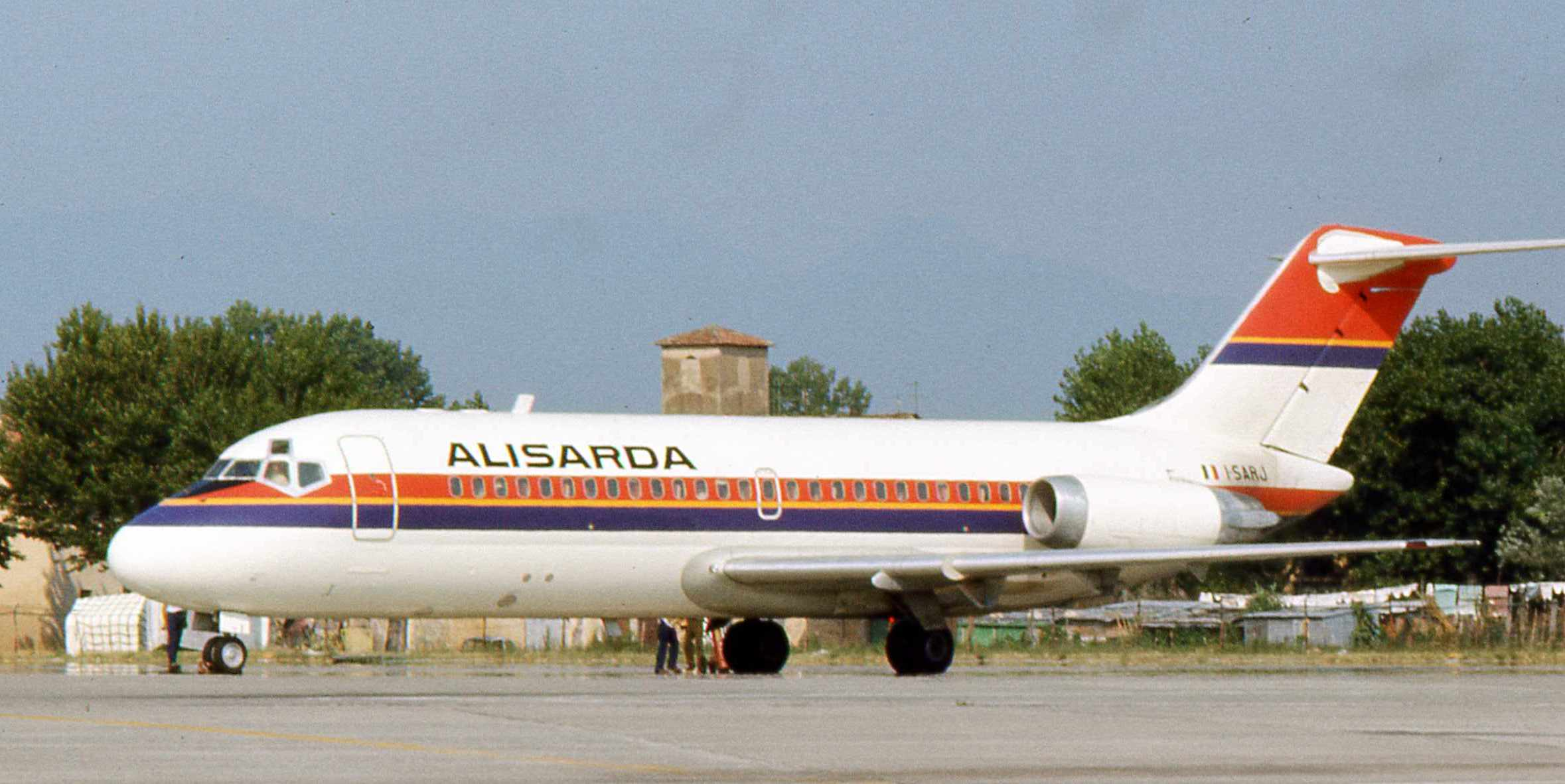
DC-9-14

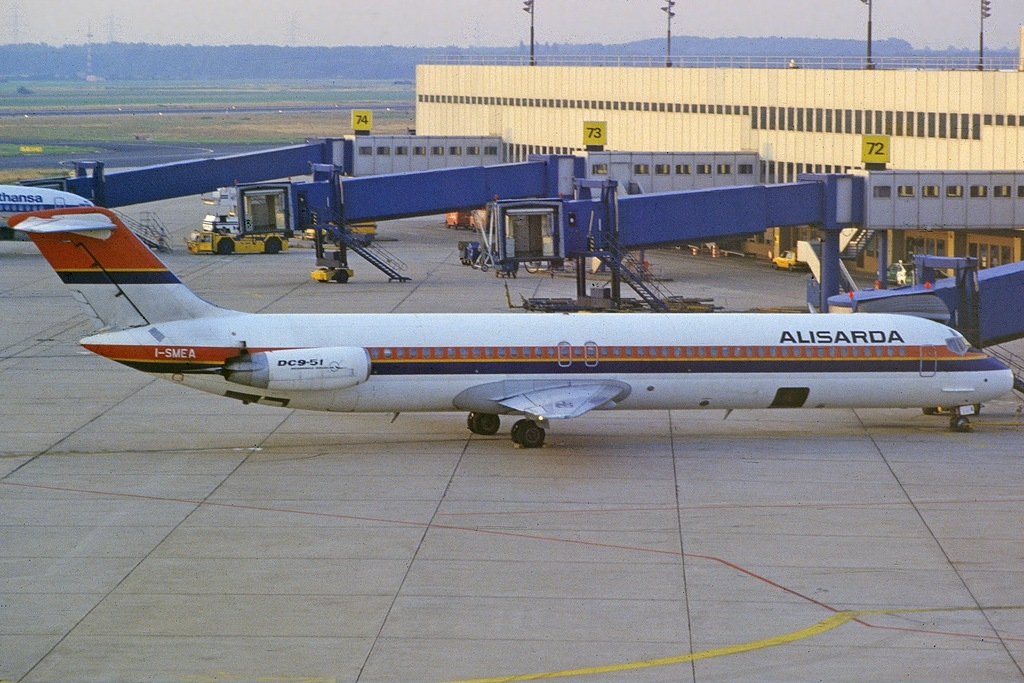
DC-9-51

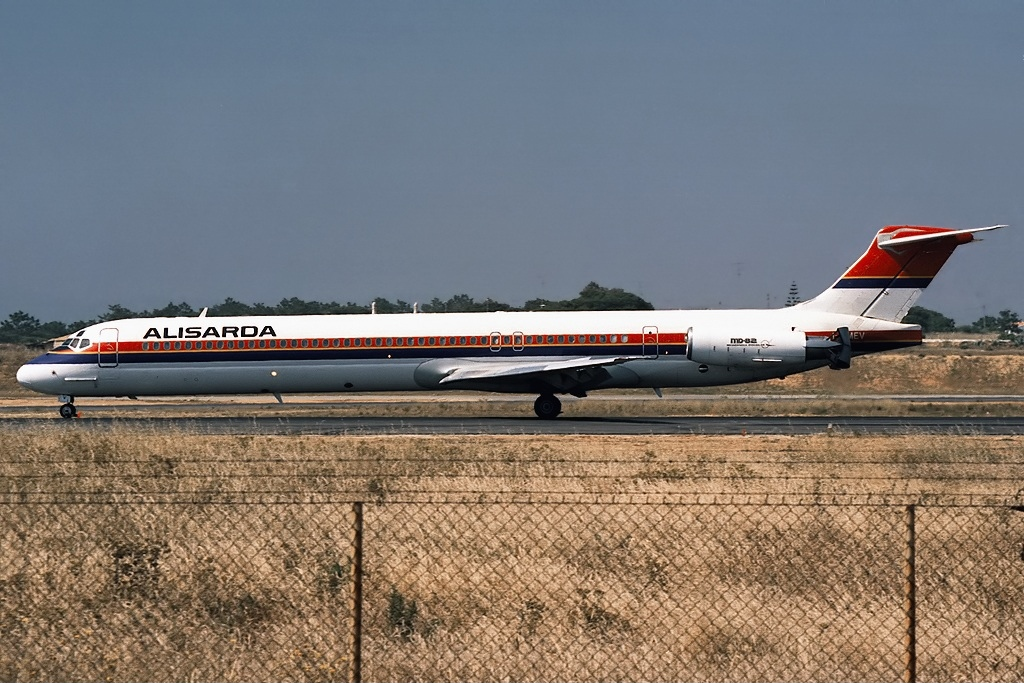
MD.82
