= Savoia-Marchetti S.66 =

Italian flying boat (first flight 1931)

S.66

General information
- Type: Flying boat airliner then search and rescue
- National origin: Italy
- Manufacturer: Savoia-Marchetti
- Status: Retired
- Primary users: Ala Littoria Regia Aeronautica
- Number built: 24

History
- Introduction date: 1932
- First flight: 1931
- Retired: 1939 (civil use); 1943 (military)
- Developed from: Savoia-Marchetti S.55

The Savoia-Marchetti S.66 was a 1930s Italian twin-hull flying boat designed and built by Savoia-Marchetti as an enlarged development of the S.55.

== Development ==
Rear quarter view of Ala Littoria's Savoia-Marchetti S.66 with registration marking I-REDI.

The S.66 was developed as an enlarged version of the S.55 with the aim of replacing the S.55P. The S.66 was a twin-hull cantilever monoplane flying boat with metal hull and wings and wooden twin-booms and tail unit. The two crew had an enclosed cockpit mounted in the wing centre section between the two hulls; each hull contained seven seats, two sleeping couches and a lavatory. The prototype first flew in 1931 powered by three Fiat A.22 R. engines strut-mounted above the wing. The company built 23 production aircraft with three 559 kW (750 hp) Fiat A.24R engines and the sleeping couches were replaced by two to four more seats in each hull.

== Operators ==
Pre-World War II
Kingdom of Italy

- Ala Littoria
- Società Aerea Mediterranea

World War II
Kingdom of Italy

- Regia Aeronautica operated S.66s for search and rescue

== Specifications (S.66) ==
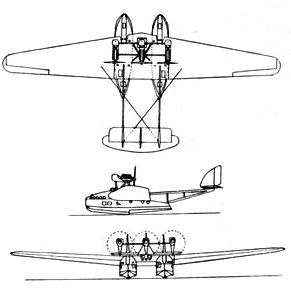
Savoia Marchetti S.66 3-view drawing from L'Aerophile October 1932

Data from The Illustrated Encyclopedia of Aircraft and Ali italiane

General characteristics

- Crew: 2
- Capacity: 18/22 passengers (nine to eleven in each hull)
- Length: 16.63 m (54 ft 7 in)
- Wingspan: 33 m (108 ft 3 in)
- Height: 4.90 m (16 ft 1 in)
- Wing area: 126.70 m^{2} (1,363.8 sq ft)
- Empty weight: 7,450 kg (16,424 lb)
- Gross weight: 10,950 kg (24,141 lb)
- Powerplant: 3 × Fiat A.24R V12 engines, 559 kW (750 hp) each

Performance

- Maximum speed: 264 km/h (164 mph, 143 kn)
- Cruise speed: 235 km/h (146 mph, 127 kn)
- Range: 1,200 km (750 mi, 650 nmi)
- Service ceiling: 5,000 m (16,000 ft)

== See also ==
- List of flying boats and floatplanes
