= Petrella Airport =

International airport in Somalia

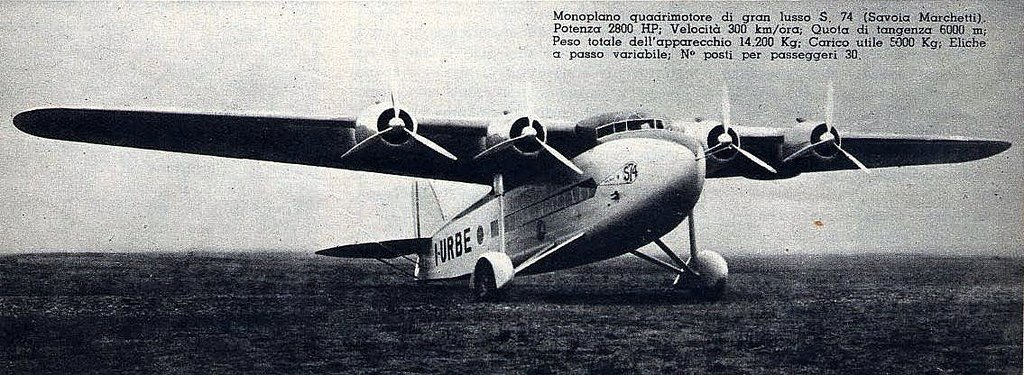
A Savoia-Marchetti 74 of Ala Littoria in Petrella airport

The Petrella Airport (officially called "Aeroporto di Mogadiscio-Petrella") was the first international airport in Italian Somalia. It was opened in 1928 – just 3 miles south of Mogadishu – with the name "Enrico Petrella" in honor of an Italian pilot who died a few years before in the same airport of Italian Mogadiscio (in 1921, when was a simple airstrip runway). In 1941, the airport was partially destroyed during WW2 and remained inactive for some years as a civilian airport: only military airplanes used it. In 1950, was reopened as a civilian airport by the Italian authorities of the ONU Fiduciary Mandate.

== History ==
The initial Mogadishu airport was established in 1928 with the name "Aeroporto di Mogadiscio-Petrella", the first such facility to be opened in the Horn of Africa.

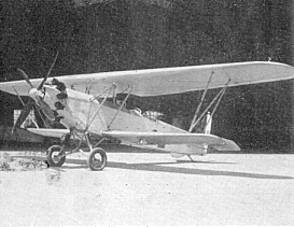
A "Romeo Ro.1" airplane used by Squadriglia Mogadiscio, based on Petrella airport

It was located nearly 5 km south of Mogadiscio's port: since 1938 a bus service (one of the first in Africa) was connecting the airport with the colonial Italian city and its port.

It served as the main military airport serving Italian Somaliland. The "36 Squadriglia Mogadiscio" was based there since 1926. The airport was the center for Italian air-raids & bombings on southern Ethiopia during the Italian conquest of Abyssinia in 1935-1936.

In 1930, the airport was known worldwide because the pilot Carlo Francis Lombardi flew from Rome to Mogadiscio in the same flight, obtaining an aviation record.

In the mid-1930s, the airport began offering civilian and commercial flights. A regular Asmara-Assab-Mogadishu commercial route was started in 1935, with an Ala Littoria Caproni 133 providing 13-hour flights from the Mogadishu airport to Italian Eritrea. The aircraft had a maximal capacity of 18 passengers, which at the time was a record. In 1936, Ala Littoria launched an intercontinental connection between Mogadishu-Asmara-Khartoum-Tripoli and Rome. The voyage lasted four days and was one of the first long range flights in the world.

Ala Littoria's service to East Africa was inaugurated in 1935 under the name Linea dell'Impero. On 7 July 1935 a memorandum of agreement was signed with Imperial Airways, a private British firm, whereby they would carry Ala Littoria passengers from Brindisi in southern Italy as far as Khartoum in the Sudan (via Cairo in Egypt). This was the first leg of Imperial Airways' route from Europe to South Africa. From Khartoum, Ala Littoria's passengers would transfer to its own aircraft and fly on to Kassala (Sudan), Asmara (Eritrea), Massawa (Eritrea), Djibouti (French Somaliland), Berbera (British Somaliland), Bura Galadi (British Kenya) and Mogadishu (Italian Somaliland). Full passenger service from Rome to Mogadishu opened in November 1935. By March 1937, service had been added to Gorrahei (Ethiopia) and Beledweyne (Somalia).

In 1934 the Italian aviation in Somalia -under the orders of captain Pocci- was made of the "Squadriglia di Mogadiscio" with 9 Romeo Ro-1, the group that attacked Ual-Ual (starting the 1935 italo-ethiopian war)...Paolo Ferrari

In 1936, the governor Ruggero Santini ordered the improvement of the airport in order to get state-of-the-art civilian services.

In 1939, the Petrella airport was started to be greatly enlarged and linked to other minor airports inside the Italian East Africa (called "Rete AOI"), but the beginning of WWII blocked the works. During the East African Campaign the airport was greatly damaged.

Originally a mid-sized airport, the facility grew considerably in size in the post-independence period of Somalia after numerous successive renovation projects. Actually it has been greatly improved and it is called the Mogadishu international airport.

== Bibliography ==
- *Caprotti, Federico. "Profitability, Practicality and Ideology: Fascist Civil Aviation and the Short Life of Ala Littoria, 1934–1943." The Journal of Transport History 32.1 (2011): 17–38.
- Caprotti, Federico. "Visuality, Hybridity, and Colonialism: Imagining Ethiopia through Colonial Aviation, 1935–1940." Annals of the Association of American Geographers 101.2 (2011): 380–403.
- Ferrari, Paolo. L'aeronautica italiana: una storia del Novecento. Editore FrancoAngeli, 2004 ISBN 8846451090 ( https://books.google.com/books?id=zwdQOqm )
- Mannone Guido, Le Ali del Littorio - Piccola Storia dell'Aviazione Civile Italiana, Grafica Bierre, 2004.

== See also ==
- Italian Somalia
- Mogadishu under Italian rule
- Linea dell'Impero
