= Savoia-Marchetti S.63 =

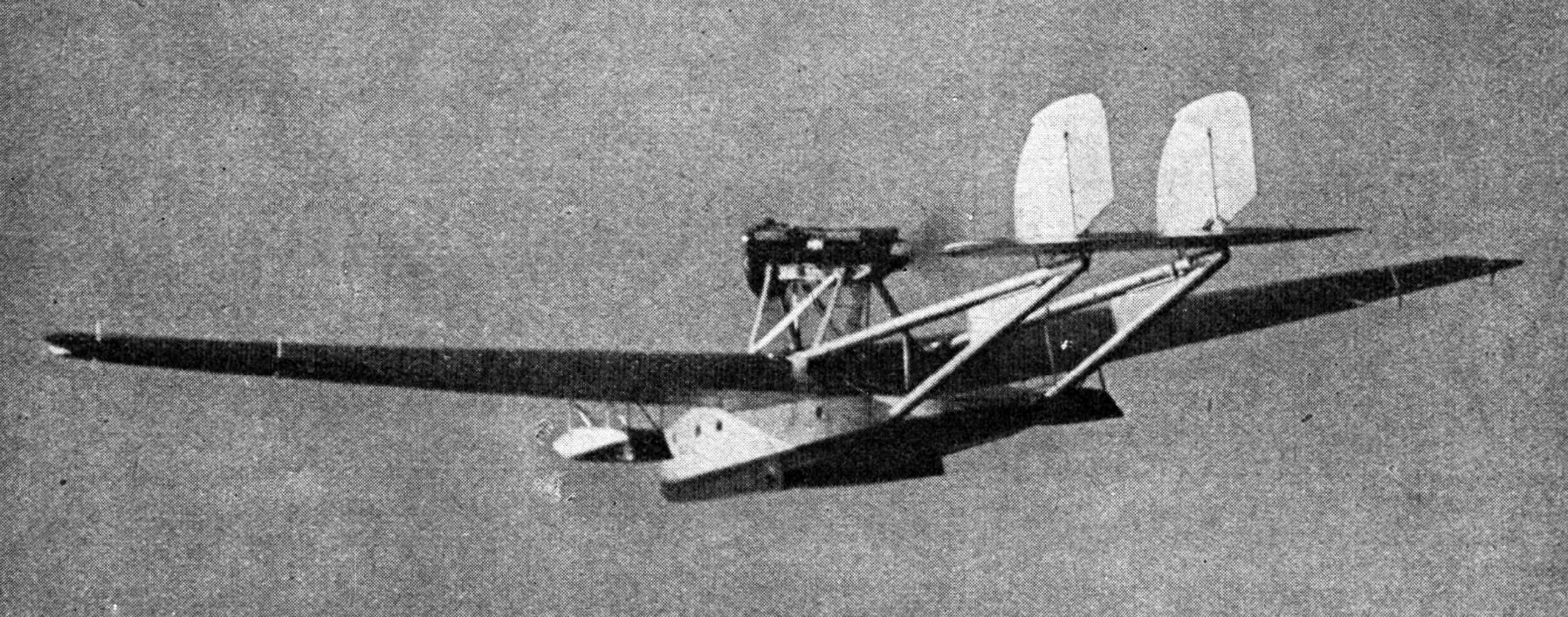

General information
- Type: Flying boat bomber and airliner
- National origin: Italy
- Manufacturer: Savoia-Marchetti
- Number built: 1

History
- First flight: 8 September 1927

The Savoia-Marchetti S.63 was a single hull development of the Italian Savoia-Marchetti S.55 flying boat. It first flew as a bomber in 1927 but was rapidly converted into an airliner. The only S.63 built served with an Italian airline.

== Design and development ==
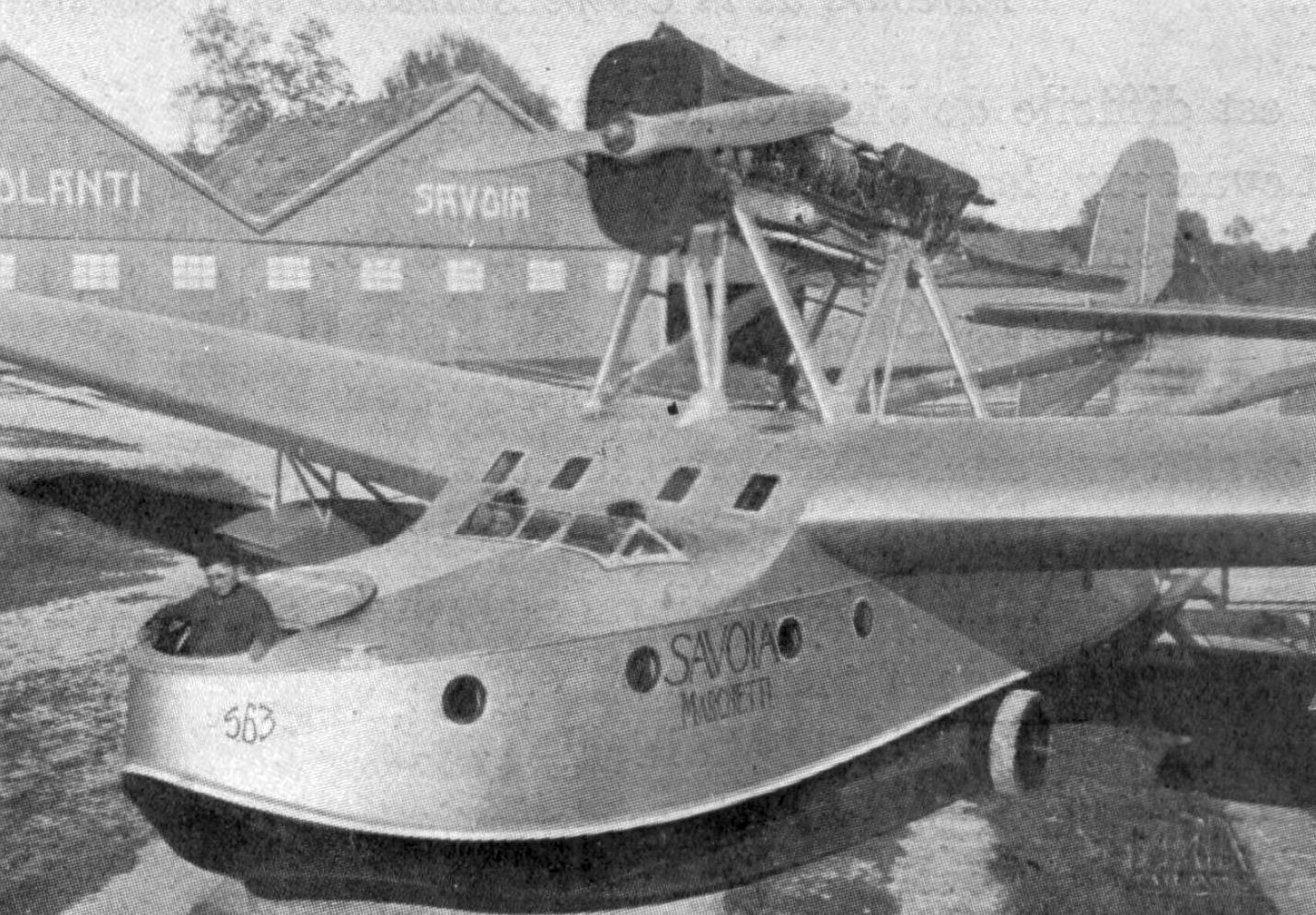
Savoia-Marchetti S.63 photo from L'Aéronautique November,1927

Savoia-Marchetti's earlier and very successful S.55 flying boat had been designed as a torpedo bomber, leading to the use of a twin hull. It could carry passengers and make long-distance flights but its hulls added drag and weight, making take-offs with large fuel loads challenging. The S.63 differed primarily in having a single hull and was originally built as a bomber. However, after service trials in 1927 it was decided that it did not offer any great advantage over the S.55, so it was converted into a ten-passenger airliner.

The S.63 was a cantilever high wing monoplane with a three-part, thick profile wing which thinned outwards; at its thickest, the centre-section was 900 mm (35.4 in) deep. The outer panels were trapezoidal in plan and set with about 6° of dihedral. They carried short, overhung, tapered ailerons near the tips. The wing was a wooden structure, with three spars. Its leading edge was covered with plywood, the rest with fabric.

The S.63 was powered by a push-pull pair of 370 kW (500 hp) water-cooled Isotta Fraschini Asso 500 V-12 engines. These were mounted high above the wing centre on inward-leaning pairs of N-struts and a pair of central transverse V-struts, canted strongly upwards and uncowled to reduce fire risk. They shared a single, forward-mounted honeycomb radiator and an oil tank positioned between them.

The earlier S.55 carried its empennage on a pair of open, flat, triangular girders constructed from tubes, one from each hull. The S.63 used a similar arrangement, allowing its single, unusually wide hull to be short. Its bottom had a shallow, concave V-section and a single step. Lateral stability on the water was provided by outward-leaning, V-bottomed floats mounted a little outside the centre-section. The original bomber version had defensive ring-mounted machine gun positions in the nose and behind the trailing edge. A forward entrance led to the pilots' side-by-side open cockpit, offset to the left and ahead of the wing leading edge. The airliner conversion separated the pilots into two symmetrically positioned, enclosed cockpits and introduced a windowed 3 m × 3 m (9 ft 10 in × 9 ft 10 in) passenger cabin behind the cockpit which seated ten. Behind it there was a space for luggage and a wireless operator's compartment with access to the engines.

The empennages of the S.55 and S.63 were similar, though the latter had two vertical tails rather than three. These were wire-braced and, including balanced rudders, quadrantal in profile, with one attached to each girder. A rectangular tailplane, mounted at a high incidence, linked the girders and projected beyond them. It carried a semi-elliptical, balanced elevator.

== Operational history ==
The first flight of the S.63 was on 8 September 1927. By March 1928 Alandresso Passaleva had completed sufficient testing to report excellent characteristics. Registered as I-AABH, it was bought by Società Aerea Mediterranea (SAM) airline and used on the Rome-Cagliari route along with their S.55s.

== Operators ==
Italy

- Società Aerea Mediterranea

== Specifications ==
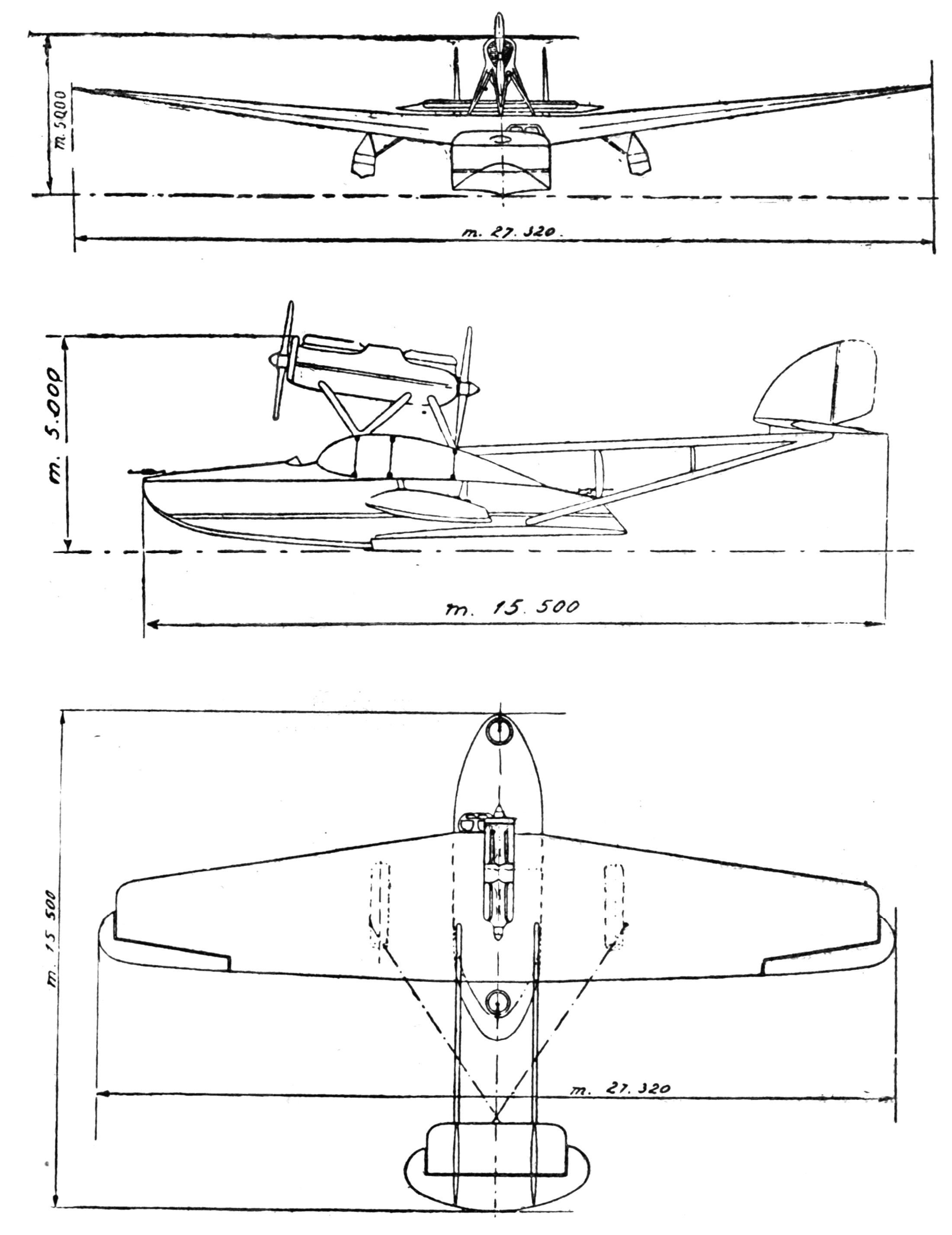
Savoia-Marchetti S.63 3-view drawing from L'Air January 1, 1928

Data from Les Ailes, March 1928

General characteristics

- Crew: 4 (bomber version)
- Capacity: 10 passengers
- Length: 15.50 m (50 ft 10 in)
- Wingspan: 27 m (88 ft 7 in)
- Height: 5 m (16 ft 5 in)
- Wing area: 105 m^{2} (1,130 sq ft)
- Empty weight: 3,900 kg (8,598 lb)
- Gross weight: 6,100 kg (13,448 lb) with normal (2,200 kg (4,900 lb)) useful load
- Max takeoff weight: 6,900 kg (15,212 lb)
- Powerplant: 2 × Isotta Fraschini Asso 500 water-cooled V-12, 370 kW (500 hp) each (nominal)
- Propellers: 2-bladed

Performance

- Maximum speed: 210 km/h (130 mph, 110 kn)
- Cruise speed: 170 km/h (110 mph, 92 kn)
- Stall speed: 100 km/h (62 mph, 54 kn) minimum speed
- Time to altitude: 40 min to 2,000 m (6,600 ft)
- Fuel consumption: 0.85 kg/km (3.0 lb/mi)
