= CA-103 =

CA-103 may refer to:

- California State Route 103
- Caproni Ca.103, an experimental aircraft
- Caldwell 103, a star cluster
