= Aero Espresso Italiana =

First airline of the Kingdom of Italy

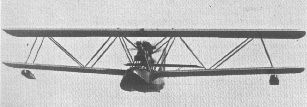
Aero Espresso Italiana flew the Macchi 24bis with 8 passengers in 1927

The Aero Espresso Italiana, called also AEI and Aeroespresso del Levante, was the first airline of the Kingdom of Italy. It was created as a private company for the route Brindisi-Athens-Istanbul; later a second route to Rhodes was added

== History ==
The airline company, founded in Rome in December 1923, was operating with flights only from 1926. It was based in Rome and worked, as was customary in the period, with services of passenger transport and international air mail in the 1920s and early 1930s.

Like many other European nations did in their early phases of civil aviation, Italy initially formed several small companies that struggled to provide a modest level of passenger service. The first of these was the Aero Expresso Italiana (AEI), founded on December 12, 1923, which began offering services in August 1926.

In the early 1930s Aero Espresso Italiana had two flights toward eastern Europe:

- Brindisi – Athens – Istanbul/Costantinopole
- Brindisi – Athens – Rodi

The AEI used mainly the flying boats Savoia 55, but also the Macchi 24bis and Dornier.

The AEI remained active until its absorption, in 1934, by the national airline Ala Littoria (that was formed by a merger of Società Aerea Mediterranea (SAM), Società Anonima Navigazione Aerea (SANA), Società Italiana Servizi Aerei (SISA) and Aero Espresso Italiana).

== See also ==
- List of defunct airlines of Italy
- Ala Littoria
- Società Anonima Navigazione Aerea

== Bibliography ==
- Flying Magazine. May 1929. 112 pages; Vol. 4, No. 5 ISSN 0015-4806
- Taylor, Michael J. H. (1989). Jane's Encyclopedia of Aviation. London: Studio Editions.
- various authors, Le Ali della Rondine (in Italian language), I.T.A.C.A., Roma, 1992
- L. Caliaro, Signori a bordo (in Italian language), Luckyplane, 2019, ISBN 978-8-8943919-1-6
