= Ala Littoria =

Italian national airline (1934–1945)

- Founded: 28 November 1934
- Ceased operations: 1945
- Operating bases: Littorio Airport
- Fleet size: 113 (at its peak)
- Parent company: Government of the Kingdom of Italy
- Headquarters: Rome, Kingdom of Italy
- Key people: Umberto Klinger

Ala Littoria S.A. was the Italian flag carrier that operated during the fascist regime in the 1930s and 1940s. The airline did not survive the fall of the Fascist regime and was replaced after World War II by Aerolinee Italiane Internazionali, later renamed Alitalia.

== History ==
=== Background ===
The first scheduled Italian flight, operated by Società Anonima Transadriatica, took off from Venice-Lido Airport on 18 August 1926. It was headed to Vienna via Klagenfurt and was operated with Junkers G 24 trimotors. Initially carried out on an experimental basis, the service became regular on 1 February 1927. On 19 April, the route was extended to include three weekly flights to Vienna with Junkers G 24s.

Commercial aviation in Italy grew steadily in the following years. In 1928, the main civilian airport in Italy, Littorio Airport (now Rome Urbe Airport), was inaugurated in the presence of Benito Mussolini. Initially, it was operated by Compagnia Nazionale Aeronautica, a private company founded in 1920 by Count Giovanni Bonmartini. According to website "Century of Flight":

Like many other European nations did in their early phases of civil aviation, Italy initially formed several small companies that struggled to provide a modest level of passenger service. The first of these was the Aero Expresso Italiana (AEI), founded on December 12, 1923, which began offering services in August 1926. By 1930, there were five other Italian airlines, including the Società Italiana Servizi Aerei (SISA), the Società Area Navigazione Aerea (SANA), the Società Area Mediterranea (SAM), and the Società Area Avio-Linee Italiane (ALI). Almost all of these early Italian air services were state-owned or state supported. The only major exception was the ALI, which was backed by the powerful Fiat industrial empire, a builder of automobiles. The three biggest airlines, SISA, SANA, and SAM, equally split the Italian civil aviation market, carrying about 10,000 passengers per year by 1930. If in 1925, it seemed like Italians hardly had a civil aviation sector, by 1930, they had made rapid progress (when "Ala Littoria" was created). In fact, Italian commercial aviation in 1930 was third in terms of the number of passengers carried, after Germany and France, and ahead of Great Britain and the Netherlands.

=== Foundation and early expansion ===
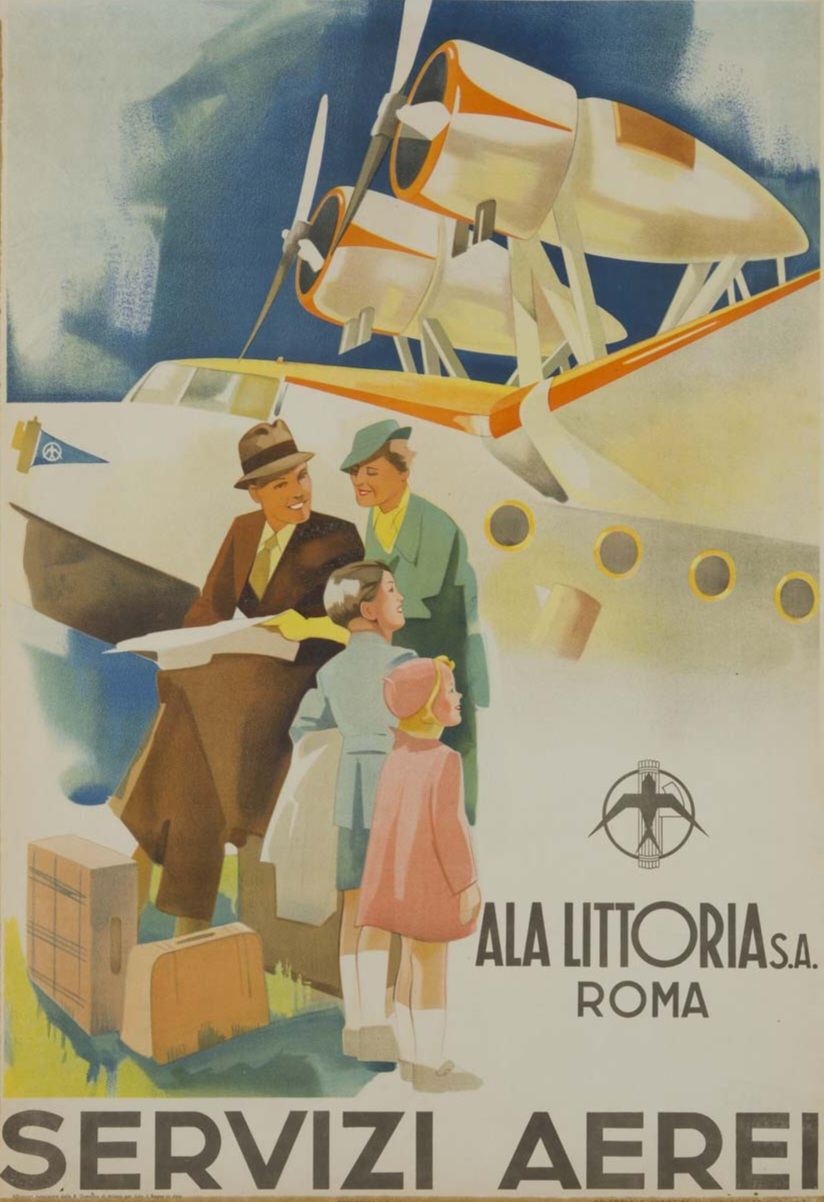
Late 1930s poster advertising Ala Littoria

Ala Littoria was formed by a merger of Società Aerea Mediterranea (SAM), Società Anonima Navigazione Aerea (SANA), Società Italiana Servizi Aerei (SISA) and Aero Espresso Italiana (AEI) on 28 October 1934 (the 12th anniversary of the March on Rome). Ala Littoria was established by the fascist government, at the behest of Benito Mussolini, who suggested the name. The aviator Umberto Klinger was appointed president. The airline was owned by the Italian government and predominantly featured the Italian flag on its aircraft.

At the time of its foundation, the company's fleet consisted of various state-of-the-art aircraft, including Savoia-Marchetti S.55 and S.66, Junkers G 24 and F 13, Dornier Do J and Do R, and Fokker F.VII. Initially, the company had a large fleet of seaplanes, as utilising rivers, lakes, and waterways as landing strips avoided the need to invest in large-scale infrastructure, such as airports. However, as air traffic and customer demand grew, several conventional airports were built. To remain competitive with foreign rivals, Ala Littoria began incorporating land-based aircraft into its fleet, including Savoia-Marchetti S.73, initially designed as bombers but converted for civilian use.

As president and chief executive, Klinger oversaw the expansion of his air company's Mediterranean and Northern European networks and the implementation of regular trade links between the mother country and the Italian colonies in the Horn of Africa and the rest of Africa. In 1934 Ala Littoria was enlarged and started some flights toward European countries, like France, and also toward the eastern Mediterranean region Following agreements with Lufthansa and KLM, Ala Littoria launched a daily service from Milan via Frankfurt am Main to Amsterdam on 7 May 1935. A similar agreement with Air France enabled Ala Littoria to commence daily flights from Rome via Marseille to Paris in 1936. This profitable route primarily used the new four-engine Savoia-Marchetti S.74 aircraft, which could reach speeds of around 300 km/h and carry 24 passengers. A further agreement with Imperial Airways in 1935 improved connections to Africa, particularly via Brindisi and Khartoum.

In 1935, Ala Littoria acquired Adria Aero Lloyd, which operated routes to Albania, and Nord Africa Aviazione (founded in 1931). After the Spanish Civil War, Ala Littoria invested in Iberia, the Spanish airline that was established following the demise of LAPE. Ala Littoria acquired 12,5 % of the airline and purchased three Junkers Ju 52 airframes without engines from Lufthansa, giving them to Iberia in lieu of capital.

=== The Imperial Line and World War II ===
Linea dell'Impero aircraft
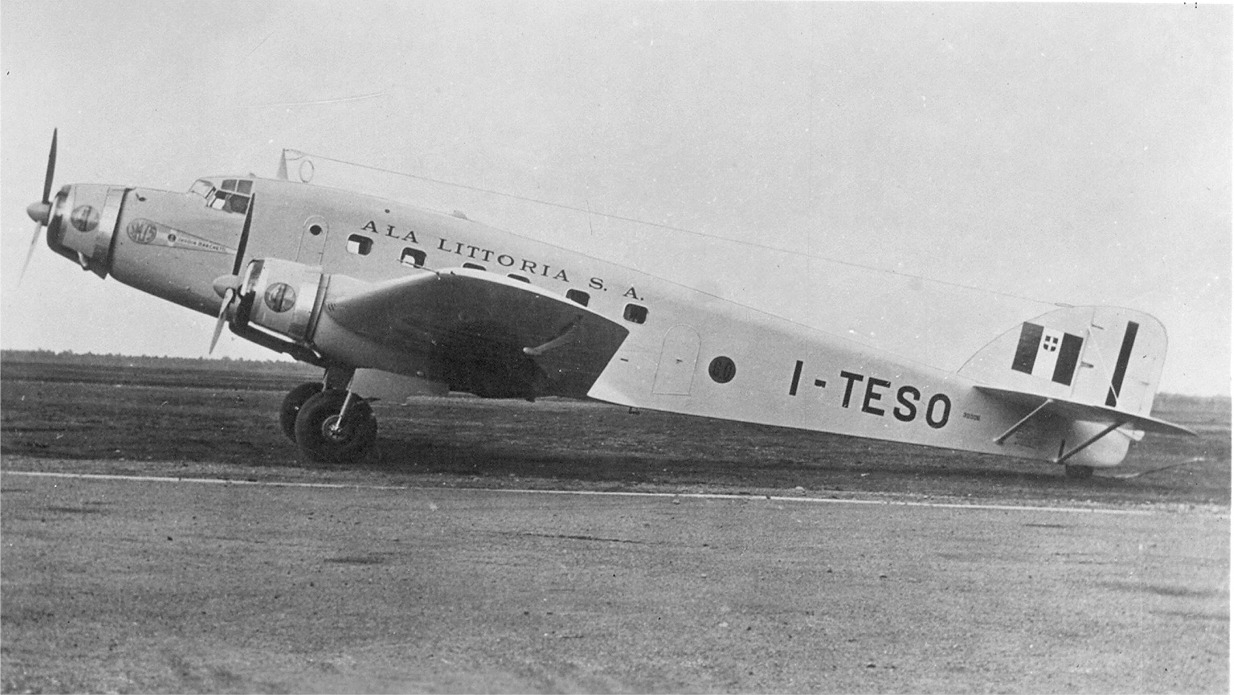
- Savoia-Marchetti SM.75 "Marsupiale" of Ala Littoria

Ala Littoria flew to destinations across Europe and the Italian colonies in Africa. In 1934 was done an experimental flight from Rome to Mogadiscio in Italian Somalia, that established a world record on long distance civil flight and allowed to start the Imperial Line (Linea dell'Impero) the next year, in 1935.

Linea dell'Impero was the longest route in Africa by Ala Littoria in the years preceding World War II and was considered the most prestigious Italian air route of the time. It connected Rome with Mogadiscio in Italian East Africa, and from 1939 the route could be travelled without a change of airplane with a state-of-the-art- Savoia Marchetti (civilian) SM 75.

In March 1938 the airline did the first record flight from Rome to Argentina with the route Roma-Cagliari-Bathurst/Gambia-Bahia-Rio de Janeiro-Buenos Aires, using a special hydroplane of the model CANT Z.506, but later the company was substituted by the newly created LATI for the Latin American flights.

Ala Littoria routes in 1940 grew to 37,110 km, mainly in the Mediterranean and Africa. This gave Italy the fifth most extensive air routes in the world (after the United States, the Soviet Union, Germany and the United Kingdom). Following Italy's entry into World War II, civil flights were suspended. In 1941, the General Staff of the Regia Aeronautica imposed the militarisation of civil aviation, placing it under the control of the Special Air Service Command (SASC). During the War, Ala Littoria acted as a transport service for the Royal Italian Army. However the airline did not survive the war and was disbanded. It was substituted after the war by Aerolinee Italiane Internazionali, established on 16 September 1946 and later renamed Alitalia.

== Airports connected ==
In 1940 Ala Littoria reached and connected the following airports:

Italy

- Alghero, Ancona, Bologna, Brindisi, Cagliari, Catania, Fiume (at that time Italian territory), Genoa, Lussino (at that time Italian territory), Milan, Naples, Palermo, Pola (at that time Italian territory), Rimini, Rhodes, Rome, Syracuse, Trapani, Trieste, Venice, Zara (at that time Italian territory).

Northern and Eastern Italian Africa

- Addis Ababa, Asmara, Massaua, Assab, Dessiè, Dire Dawa, Gambela-Dembidollo, Gimma, Gondar, Gorrahei, Lechemtì-Asosa, Mogadishu, Negelle, Benghazi, Tripoli.

Europe

- Athens, Barcelona, Belgrade, Berlin, Bucharest, Cadiz, Constanța, Lisbon, Malaga, Malta, Marseille, Munich, Palma, Paris, Thessaloniki, Seville, Tirana, Vienna.

Middle East and Africa

- Baghdad, Haifa, Basra, Cairo, Djibouti, Khartoum, Melilla, Tetouan, Tunis, Wadi Halfa.

== Fleet ==
In 1940, Ala Littoria's fleet included 39 Seaplanes and 74 landplanes:

A Savoia-Marchetti S.66 seaplane of the airline.

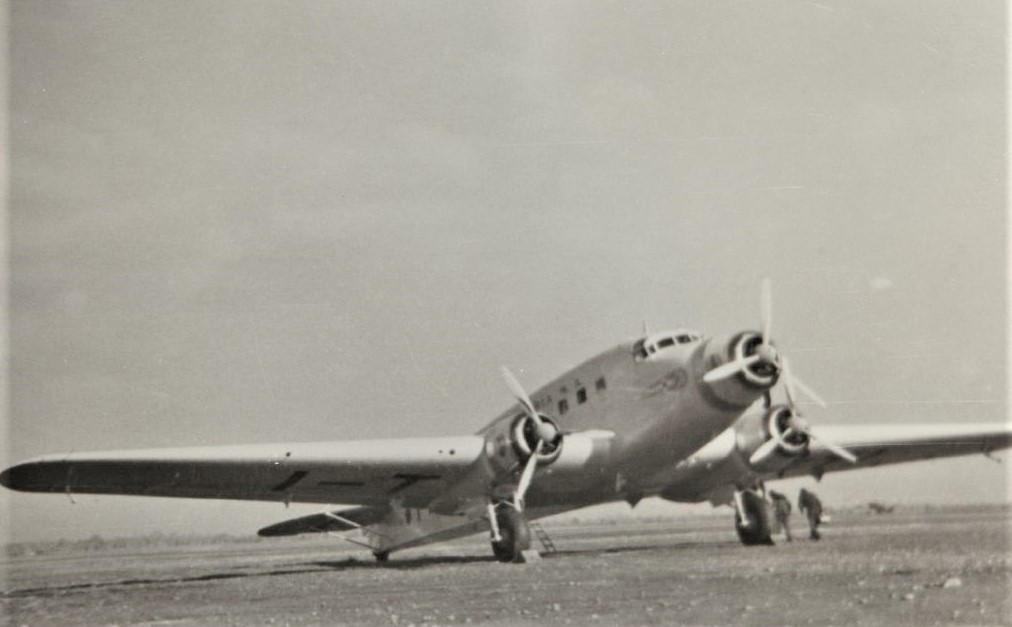
A Savoia-Marchetti S.M.75 of Ala Littoria

Seaplanes

- 14 CANT Z.506
- 8 Macchi M.C.94
- 16 Savoia-Marchetti S.66
- 1 Dornier Do J

Land aircraft

- 4 Breda Ba.44
- 10 Caproni Ca.133
- 3 Savoia-Marchetti S.71
- 18 Savoia-Marchetti S.73
- 3 Savoia-Marchetti S.74
- 36 Savoia-Marchetti S.75

== Accidents and incidents ==
=== Fatal accidents ===
- On 24 September 1936, CANT Z.506 I-RODI struck a ship mast following an engine fire and crashed off Benghazi, Libya, killing nine of 10 on board.
- On 2 August 1937, Savoia-Marchetti S.73 I-SUSA crashed on approach to Wadi Halfa Airport, Sudan, with the loss of all 9 occupants (6 passengers and 3 crew). The crew, for reasons unknown, carried out a missed approach, but the aircraft then stalled and crashed.
- On 13 February 1938, CANT Z.506 I-ORIA crashed off Sardinia, Italy in poor weather, killing all 14 on board.
- On 30 April 1938, Fight 422, operated by Savoia-Marchetti S.73 I-MEDA, crashed on a flight from Tirana to Rome. The aircraft struck the mountains near Maranola and all nineteen occupants were killed.
- On 14 July 1938, Savoia-Marchetti S.66 I-VOLO crashed in the Mediterranean Sea 91 mi off Terranova, Sardinia, Italy, killing all 20 on board.
- On 22 November 1938, Savoia-Marchetti SM.75C I-TUON crashed near Winklern, Austria in poor weather after the aircraft was blown off course, killing four of five on board.
- On 17 October 1939, a Savoia-Marchetti S.73, possibly I-IESI, reportedly struck a hill and crashed near Olias, Spain, killing 15 of 17 on board. The aircraft type was not reported in newspaper reports, but was most likely an S.73.
- On 4 December 1939, Junkers Ju 52/3mlu flying in bad weather between Munich and Berlin struck a hillside near Bayerisch Eisenstein, Germany, at an altitude of about 1000 metres (3281 feet) and crashed, killing four of the 17 people on board.
- On 10 February 1940, Savoia-Marchetti SM.75 I-LEAL struck a wooded mountainside at Aiello Calabro, Italy, killing all ten on board.
- On 16 May 1940, Savoia-Marchetti SM.75 I-LUPI crashed on takeoff at Barcelona Airport, killing all eight on board. A ladder stored in the cargo hold shifted and jammed the controls.
- On 30 July 1941, Macchi M.C.100 I-PACE crashed at Lido di Ostia Seaplane Base while the crew was attempting to return following an engine problem, killing five of 25 on board.
- On 23 November 1942, Savoia-Marchetti SM.75 I-MAGA crashed in the Mediterranean Sea, killing all four on board; the aircraft was probably shot down.

=== Non-fatal accidents ===
- On 13 October 1939, Caproni Ca.133 I-DIRE crashed at Gabode, Djibouti following engine failure; all six on board survived.
- On 17 January 1941, Savoia-Marchetti SM.75 I-LUME crashed while landing at Fontanarossa Airport. Thirty minutes after takeoff the aircraft returned to the airport when the right engine caught fire. While landing the aircraft struck two Luftwaffe Junkers Ju 88s, causing serious damage. All 17 on board were able to escape before the aircraft burned out. The aircraft was operating a military flight.

== See also ==
- List of defunct airlines of Italy
- Imperial Line
