= Empire Line =

Empire Line may refer to:

- Empire silhouette style of women's dresses
- Empire Corridor rail line in New York State
  - Empire Service (train), an Amtrak service which that uses the line
- Imperial Line, a flight route of the Italian national airline Ala Littoria between 1935 and 1941
- "Empire Line", a song by The National from Sleep Well Beast
