= BRG =

BRG may refer to:

- ISO code for the Baure language, a near extinct language of Bolivia
- Berkeley Research Group, LLC, a global expert services and consulting firm
- Postal code for Birgu, Malta
- Borough Green & Wrotham railway station in Kent, England
- BRG Sports, an American sports equipment manufacturer
- British racing green, a dark green colour traditionally used on early UK racing cars
- Brownsville and Rio Grande International Railroad, Texas
- Fiat BRG, a 1930s bomber of the Italian air force
- IATA code for Mareeba Airfield, an airfield located south of Mareeba, Queensland, Australia
