= Dornier Do R Superwal =

Do R Superwal
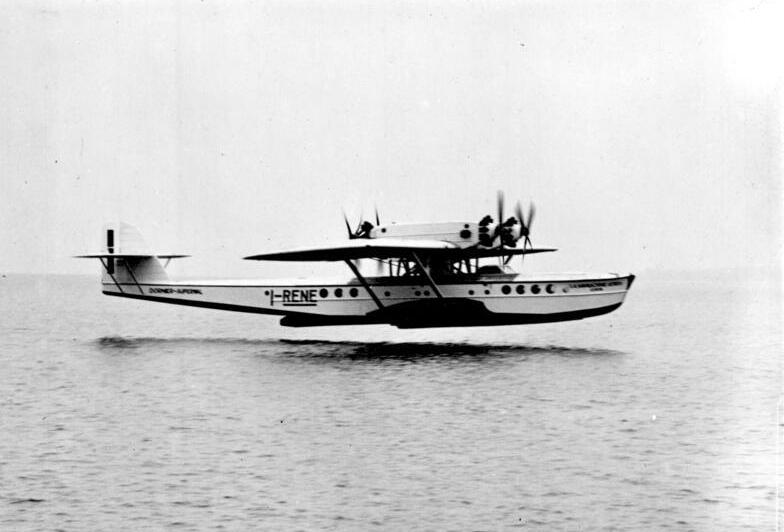

General information
- Type: Flying Boat Airliner
- Manufacturer: Dornier
- Primary users: Deutsche Luft Hansa SANA
- Number built: 19

History
- First flight: September 1926

The Dornier Do R Superwal was a flying boat airliner designed and produced by the German aircraft manufacturer Dornier.

The Do R was a larger development of the Do J, possessing a larger high-mounted strut-braced monoplane wing and an elongated fuselage. All but the first three flying boats built were powered by four engines in place of the Do J's two; the manufacturer speculated that up to six engines could be readily installed. A variety of powerplants could be fitted to suit customer preferences. The Do R could typically carry 21 passengers in two cabins; 13 in the forward cabin and eight in the rear; however, on some short demonstration flights, it was capable of carrying as many as 60 passengers.

On 30 September 1926, the first R 2 Superwal conducted its maiden flight; twelve world records for seaplanes were set by the type during early 1927. Several were operated by Deutsche Luft Hansa and SANA. It was also flown by the Aviación Militar Española.

== Development ==
=== Dornier R 2 Superwal ===
The first R 2 Superwal, (D-1115), made its maiden flight on 30 September 1926. It was powered by a pair of 650 hp Rolls-Royce Condor III engines were mounted in tandem in a nacelle above the wing and in line with the hull; one engine drove a tractor propeller and the other drove a pusher propeller. D-1115 was the largest flying boat that could be built in the postwar Dornier factory in Manzell.

The Superwal went into service with Severa and later DVS in List, both organisations of the German government, tasked to develop military seaplanes, ignoring restrictions imposed under the Treaty of Versailles. Two more R 2 Superwals were built in 1927 for Severa (D-1255 and D-1385). D-1255 was periodically operated by Deutsche Luft Hansa and was named Narwal. D-1385 was equipped with 800 hp Packard engines, and remained in service until November 1936.

=== Dornier R 4 Superwal ===
Between 20 January 1927 and 5 February 1927, Dornier Chief Pilot Richard Wagner established twelve world records for seaplanes with a new R4 Gas Superwal. This aircraft and eleven more with Gnome et Rhône Bristol-Jupiter engines (R4 Gas) or 525 hp Siemens-Bristol-Jupiter engines (R4 Sas) were delivered to the Italian airline Società Anonima Navigazione Aerea (SANA) and Luft Hansa during 1928 and 1929.

Apart from their use by Luft Hansa, six Superwals saw regular service with SANA into the early 1930s on a route along the Italian west coast and on to Spain. Three aircraft were lost during their service. The Superwal I-RUDO (equipped with Isotta Fraschini Asso 500 engines) went into service with the Italian Air Ministry in 1934 and became the last Superwal in Italian service. At least one aircraft was assembled in Spain by CASA.

== Design ==
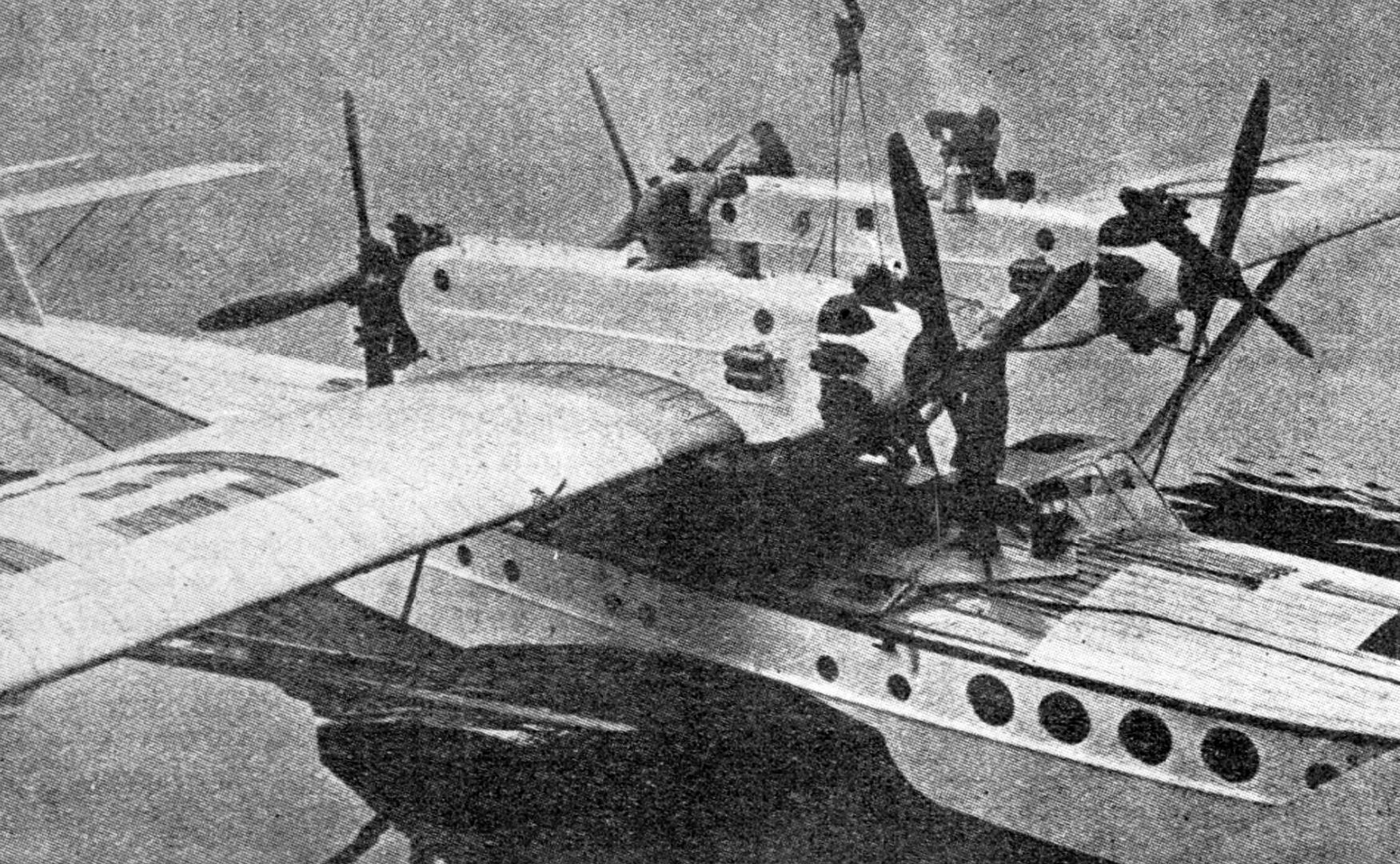
Close view of a Superwal's centre section. Note the configuration of the four engines

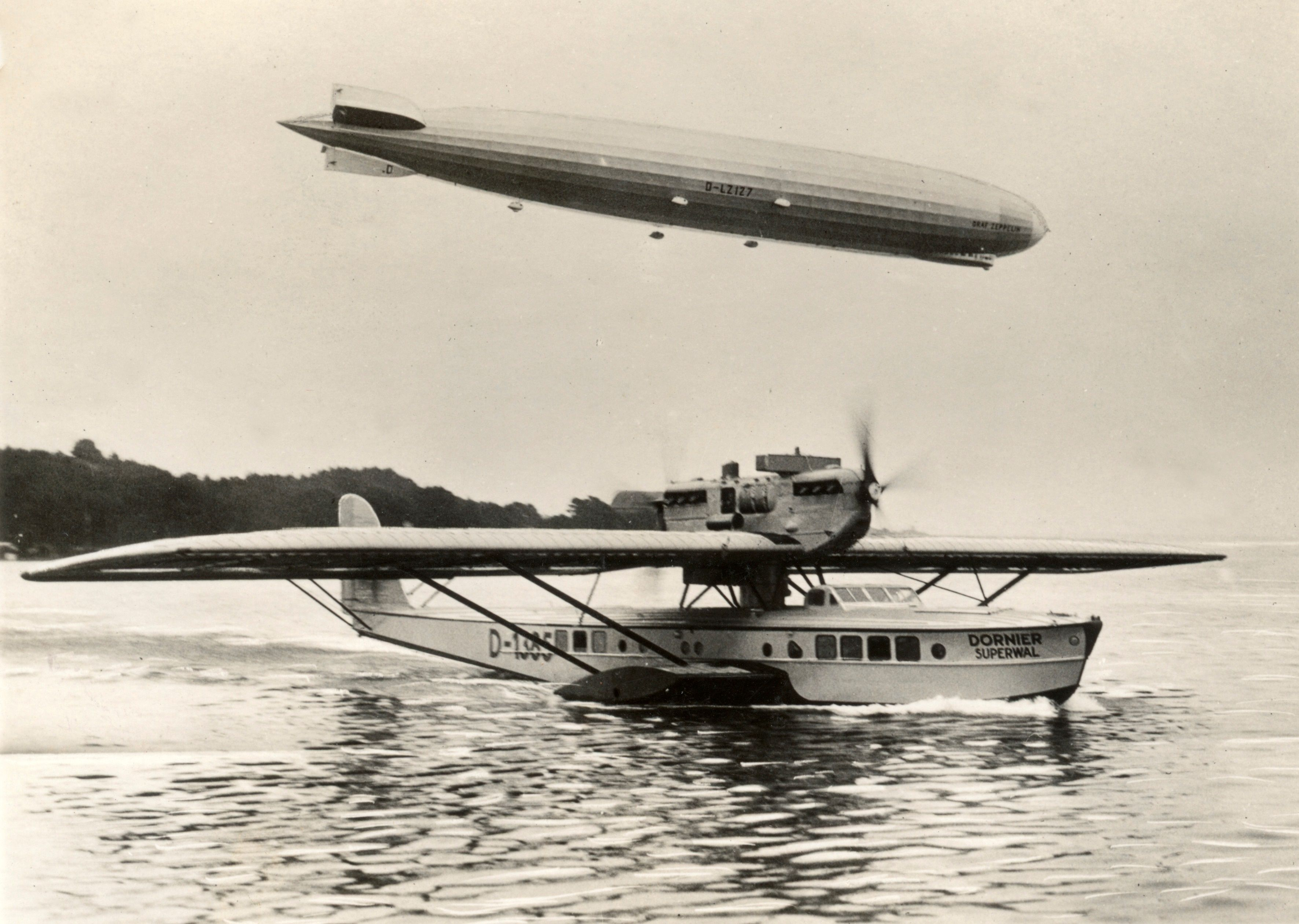
A Superwal taxiing on the water as a zeppelin flies overhead, 1928

The Dornier Do R Superwal was a flying boat airliner that, despite its relatively large size, shared numerous similarities to Dornier's prior flying boats. It had a stepped hull that had a pair of wing stubs to increase lateral stability and counteract the offset centre of gravity of the flying boat caused by the position of its elevated engines and high-mounted wing. By placing these elements relatively high, they were better protected from rough seas and corresponding potential to be damaged. The flying boat could carry almost 10 metric tons, having roughly double the payload capacity of the preceding Do J while still achieving the same speed (dependent on engine configuration).

The internal volume of the hull was divided in several watertight compartments by numerous bulkheads; the flooding of one compartment would only have a minor impact on the flying boat's overall buoyancy. In a typical configuration, directly aft of the bow was a cabin with space for up to 13 passengers. On the port side and to the rear of the forward passenger cabin was the pilot's room, entry to which was through a narrow passage; opposite the pilots room, on the starboard side and aft of the entrance to the hull, was the toilet. Aft of these rooms and immediately beneath the wing was a total of eight fuel tanks, which had sufficient capacity to permit flights of around 2,000 km (1,243 miles); the fuel tank could be resized or even located elsewhere in the hull at the customer's preference. Behind the fuel tanks were the sizable baggage compartment, mail room, and the rear passenger cabin, which could seat up to eight passengers. Aft of this cabin was an empty void in the hull that could be entered through several manholes for inspection and repair purposes.

The wing of the flying boat was of a semi-cantilever design, comprising a moderately thick yet aerodynamically favourable cross-section that had uniform dimensions between the tips and centre point. This was made possible by each half of the wing being braced at roughly the middle point of its overhang by a pair of streamlined struts that directly attached to the wing spars. This arrangement incurred less resistance and lower weight than a full cantilever wing would have. The spars were composed of steel and was connected to one another via a series of bridge-like double ribs which were in turn braced against one another using rods that ran parallel to the spars. The perpendicular distance between these rods was maintained by vertical rods. During assembly, the wings were the final element to be attached. Somewhat unusually, the framework of the hull was assembled upside down and rotated along its longitudinal axis part-way through.

The engine arrangement of the engines being positioned in tandem provided several benefits. The centre of gravity of the power plant was positioned directly above that of the overall craft and of the fuel tank, easing both flight and substitution options. The placement of the propellers, one behind the other (thus placing the pusher propeller in the slipstream of the tractor propeller) instead of being abreast, was claimed to have no negative impacts in any aspect; to the contrary, the spiral motion of the slipstream produced by the forward propeller was eliminated by the pusher propeller's rotation in the opposite direction. Fuel was supplied to the engines from the fuel tanks within the hull to a small gravity tank next to the engines via a windmill-driven geared fuel pump.

It was claimed that virtually any pair of engines in the 1,400-2,000 hp range could be installed and that this choice was dependent upon customer preferences. Furthermore, it was stated that the location of the engines above the middle of the wing in no way limited the flying boat to using only two engines in tandem; reportedly as many as three sets of double-engines could be accommodated upon the middle section of the wing provided that suitable distance from one another was maintained to account for the propeller diameters. In the event of a single engine outage, when operated in a twin engine arrangement, it was stated that the flying boat could maintain stable flight on only the one remaining engine while carrying at least two-thirds of full payload. Mid-flight repairs to the engines could be performed, access being achieved via a vertical passage between the tank room and the engine nacelle. Heated air was drawn from the engines to warm the passenger cabins.

== Variants ==
- R2 - early version with two Rolls-Royce Condor III inline engines (three built)
- R4 - definitive version with four engines in two tractor-pusher pairs
  - R4 Gas - with Gnome et Rhône-built Bristol Jupiter radial engines (two built)
  - R4 Nas - with Napier Lion inlines (two built)
  - R4 Sas - with Siemens-built Bristol Jupiter radials (ten built)
  - R4 Cas - with Pratt & Whitney Hornet radials (two built)

== Operators ==
Italy

- SANA

Spain

- Aviación Militar Española

Weimar Republic

- Deutsche Luft Hansa

== Specifications (R4Gas) ==
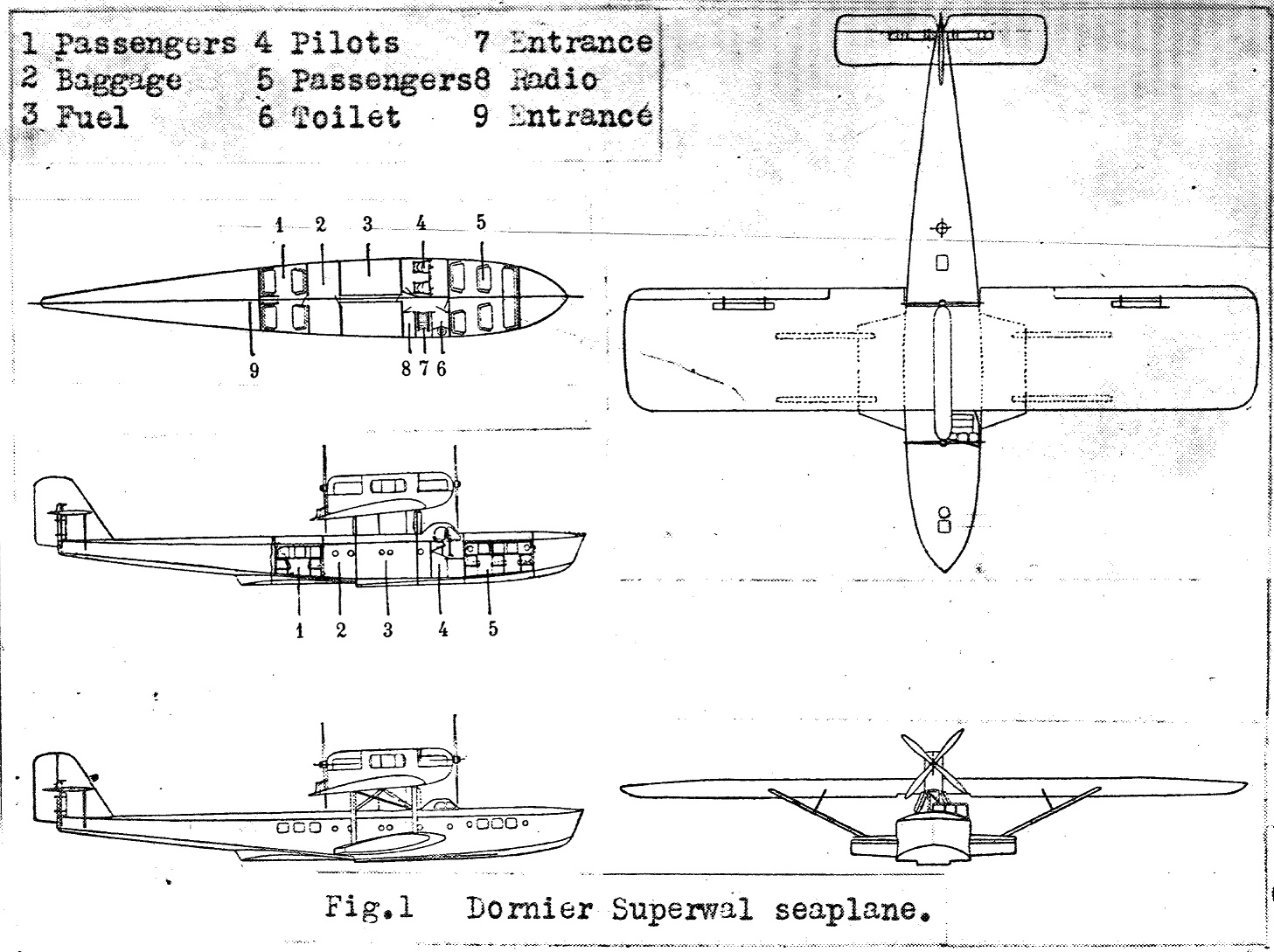
Dornier R 2 Superwal 3-view drawing from NACA Aircraft Circular No.31

Data from National Advisory Committee for Aeronautics

General characteristics

- Crew: four
- Capacity: 21 passengers
- Length: 24.60 m (80 ft 9 in)
- Wingspan: 28.60 m (93 ft 10 in)
- Height: 6.00 m (19 ft 8 in)
- Wing area: 137.0 m^{2} (1,474 sq ft)
- Empty weight: 9,850 kg (21,720 lb)
- Gross weight: 14,000 kg (30,900 lb)
- Powerplant: 4 × Siemens-built Bristol Jupiter VI , 360 kW (480 hp) each

Performance

- Maximum speed: 210 km/h (130 mph, 110 kn)
- Range: 1,500 km (930 mi, 810 nmi)
- Service ceiling: 1,500 m (4,900 ft)
