= Umberto Klinger =

Umberto Klinger

Umberto Klinger (August 3, 1900 in Saluzzo – January 26, 1971 in Venice) was an aviator, Italian politician and entrepreneur.

== Biography ==
Volunteer in the Alpini assault troop Arditi detachments during the First World War, subsequently participated in the Fiume Exploit event. Appointed by Italo Balbo, the Italian Air Minister from 1929 to 1933, he chaired and organized the first Italian airline flag company.

Senior pilot officer of the reserve in World War II, for his exploits (he personally led his crews in various military operations) has been decorated with five silver medals. He was Chief of Staff of the Special Air Service, a large transport unit of the Italian Royal Air Force.

After the conflict has reconstructed and directed the Officine Aeronautiche di Venezia (Venice Aeronautical Workshops). In the same period he organized the services of four air companies of which two foreigners.

== 1st Post-war period ==
He was a personal friend of Quadrumviro Italo Balbo and part, in the city of Ferrara, of a small group of Balbo's strict associates, including the journalist Nello Quilici and the Jewish lawyer Renzo Ravenna. He participated in "The economic reconstruction of the province of Ferrara" project, signed together with the same Balbo and Vittorio Cini and served as Federal Secretary of the city.

Oversaw the organization of Ala Littoria S.A., the first Italian flag airline with public capital, the result of the merger of six private companies.

At the 1934 Italian general election, which was the last under the rule of the fascists, Klinger was elected to the Chamber of Deputies of the Kingdom of Italy. Klinger spoke there on civil aviation, in particular on the delays in the organization of a trans-Atlantic link recommended by Balbo before taking up the post of Governor of Libya.

As president and chief executive, Klinger oversaw the expansion of his air company's Mediterranean and Northern European networks and the implementation of regular trade links between the mother country and the Italian colonies in the Horn of Africa and the rest of Africa.

In 1938, along with the commander Carlo Tonini, he made a Cant Z.506 double crossing of the Atlantic Ocean in view of the launch of regular lines with Latin America. As part of the project he sent experts to Salt Island, in the archipelago of Cape Verde, to study the possibility of installing an intermediate stop, and to Buenos Aires to check the convenience of using the flights of Corporaciòn Sul Americana de Servicios Aereos as a link between the hinterland of Argentina and neighboring countries with the Italian Atlantic line.

== World War II ==
Klinger participated in the Second World War with the rank of Lieutenant Colonel pilot of the reserve, receiving five silver medals, one of which given "on the field". He realized the first war air link with the Viceroy of Ethiopia, Prince Amedeo, Duke of Aosta, in Addis Ababa. With nocturnal flights over deserts and enemy territories, he established air routes for the supply of Italian East Africa, precluded by the closure of the Suez Canal by the British. After that he took command of 114th Independent Group of Terrestrial Bombers and was appointed as Chief of Staff of the Special Air Service, with the task of supplying the Italian troops in Tunisia and organizing paratroopers special operations. An experienced pilot himself, Klinger had logged over 4,600 flying hours at the controls of different types of aircraft, of which 940 hours were in wartime.

== 2nd Post-war period ==
After the end of WWII, Klinger accepted the invitation by the Municipal Administration of Venice and of the new Italian Government to buy out and rebuild the Aeronautical Workshops of Venice Lido, yet belonged to Ala Littoria, destroyed by the retreating Germans. Engaging its scarce resources, along with his brother's Luigi, he founded the Officine Aeronavali di Venezia. Its customers became main Italian and foreign companies, public and private ones, attracted by the ability of the Workshops in restructuring and overhauling of large aircraft. At the same time Umberto organized the activities of four air companies: the Egyptian S.A.I.D.E., the Lebanese LIA, the Italians Aeralpi for interregional transport and Società Aerea Mediterranea for charter transports and for the development of popular aerial tourism.

Major American companies settled relations with the venetian enterprise. The great aviator Chalmers Goodlin, interested in the trade of aircraft, settled for many years at the Lido with Klinger establishing an effective collaboration.

In the late 1960s, unfortunately, the persistent shortfall in payments by especially public institutions determined a financial crisis for the company resulting in the inability to meet its obligations to its employees. Exhausted attempts to obtain timely settlement of claims, Klinger committed suicide on January 26, 1971. The day before he had gone to Rome to obtain payment of his outstanding claims as unable to pay the salaries of about 500 Aeronavali workers whom in the meantime had gone on strike. The gesture raised a stir and together with many recriminations came in, in a matter of weeks, the requested resources.

The city of Venice, called on by a popular petition, has honored his memory by dedicating the stretch of the Lido promenade that borders the Venice-Lido Airport.

== Honors and awards ==
- Silver Medal of Military Valor five times
- Bronze Medal for Military Valor
- War Cross for Military Valor
- Commemorative Medal for the Italo-Austrian War 1915–1918
- Grand Officer of the Order of the Crown of Italy
- Knight of the Order of Saints Maurice and Lazarus
- Officer of the Legion of Honour
- Officer of the Order of Skanderbeg
- Knight of the Colonial Order of the Star of Italy
- Medal of Victory
- Commemorative Medal for Italian Unity
- Commemorative Medal for Military Operations in East Africa
- Commemorative Medal for the March of Ronchi
- Commemorative Medal for the Expedition to Albania

== Works ==
- L'altra sponda (Note d'una crociera adriatica), Introduzione di Nello Quilici, Ferrara, 1928
- "Rinascita Polesana", Mondadori 1924 Verona Introduzione di Curzio Suckert
- "Terre d'Italia", Officine Grafiche Corriere del Polesine 1925 Rovigo
- "Le comunicazioni aeree in Africa e l'Italia", Fondazione, A.Volta Roma 1938

== Bibliography ==
- Delisi. B. “Klinger Fondatore dell'Ala Littoria”. Folgore, organo ufficiale dei Paracadutisti d'Italia. Roma Genn. 1992.
- Delisi. B. “Un manager in guerra 1940–1943. “Lido di Oggi Lido di Allora n.10. Venezia agosto 1994
- Delisi B.”Balbo, Klinger e la prima compagnia aerea di bandiera italiana” Atti del Convegno Internazionale nel centenario della nascita di Italo Balbo, Roma, 7–8 novembre 1996,
- Delisi B. Klinger M.S. a cura di, Atti della commemorazione, Lido di Venezia 22 settembre 1991. Edizioni Serigraf Roma 1996.
- De Marchi I. "Ricordo di Umberto Klinger” Rivista Aeronautica Roma n.1 1992
- Delisi. B. "La linea Italiana dell'Atlantico Sud. Il contributo dell'Ala Littoria” catalogo della Mostra Le Ali della Rondine Compleso Munumentale di San Michele a Ripa 7 -26 maggio 1992 Itaca Roma.
- Civoli M. "S.A.S. I Servizi Aerei Speciali della Regia Aeronautica 1940–1943", Gribaudo, 2000.
- Delisi B. Klinger M.S. “Un Eroe Veneziano, Umberto Klinger e i suoi aeroplani" Giorgio Apostolo Ed. Milano 2010.
- Arpino M. “Vita Straordinaria di Umberto Klinger, aviatore romantico al servizio dell'Italia” Risk Quaderni di Geostrategia Roma, Novembre- Dicembre 2010.
