= Società Anonima Navigazione Aerea =

SANA-Società Anonima Navigazione Aerea
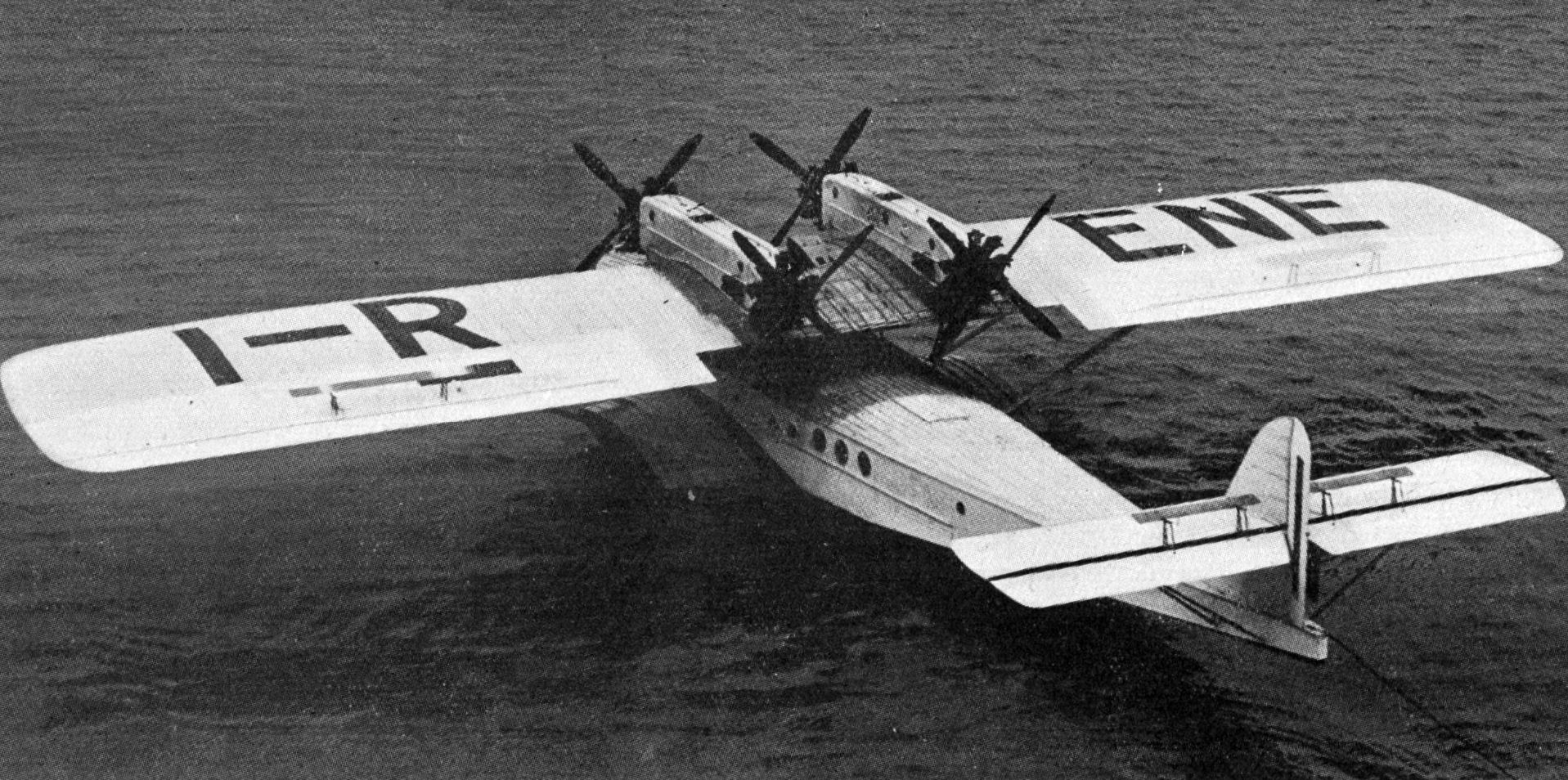
- Dornier Do R "Super Wal"
- Founded: 19 January 1925
- Commenced operations: 7 April 1926
- Ceased operations: 1934 (to form Ala Littoria)
- Hubs: Genoa
- Secondary hubs: Rome
- Headquarters: Genoa

Società Anonima Navigazione Aerea - abbreviated SANA - was an Italian airline established in 1925 in Genoa, operating routes in the Mediterranean area with only flying boats. Its origins lie in the Società Anonima Italiana Costruzioni Meccaniche, a seaplane manufacturer during World War I. The SANA's president was Rinaldo Piaggio, already owner of the company of that same name.

== History ==
On 19 January 1925, ...with the Banca Commerciale Italiana (was) formed the Società Anonima di Navigazione Aerea (known as SA Navigazione Aerea) with a stock capital of Lire 1,000,000 divided over 10,000 shares each worth Lire 100. The official aim of the company was the opening of national and international air routes and operating these by seaplanes. In order to achieve this aim, in April 1925 the company signed a contract with the Italian Government for the concession of two air services: Genova – Barcelona (Spain) and Genova – Brindisi. The concession was given for a period of ten years. SA Navigazione Aerea could count on a subsidy for 640,000 kilometres per year. A second treaty was signed on 20 November 1925, which regulated the terms and conditions under which the SA Navigazione Aerea could operate. The first air service scheduled to open would be from Genova to Roma, Napoli and Palermo on the island of Sicilia (Sicily).Rob Mulder

For over a year after its founding, the company negotiated with the Italian government for an air transport license. This goal was achieved when the company signed a contract in April 1925 for the concession of two services: Genoa-Barcelona (Spain) and Genoa-Brindisi. SANA's first flights began on April 7, 1926, on the Genoa-Ostia seaplane base (for Rome)-Naples-Palermo route with Dornier Do J "Wal" aircraft. The seaplanes utilized were built by CMASA under license from Dornier in Marina di Pisa (Pisa province) plant. Subsequently, the airline opened other routes: Ostia-Siracusa-Malta-Tripoli on November 1, 1929, Genoa-Marseille-Barcelona shortly thereafter, Ostia-Naples-Corfu-Athens-Rhodes-Tobruk-Alexandria on April 11, 1929, and Palermo-Tunis on December 19, 1929. Noticeable, the route between Italy and Egypt connected with the Imperial Airways network, meaning the British flight towards India.

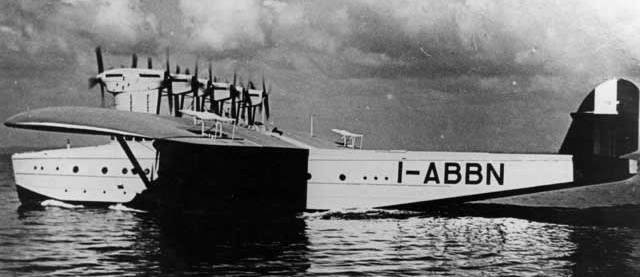
Dornier Do X

Later, the Dornier Do R "Super Wal" also entered SANA fleet, and the company entertained the possibility of purchasing the Dornier Do X. In 1929 SANA started to market its air services with Italian names: the air route to Barcelona (Spain) was called Freccia del Mediterraneo (arrow of the Mediterranean), the air route between Genoa and Palermo was called Freccia Verde (green arrow) and the Rome–Tripoli air service was named Freccia Rossa (red arrow). One year later the international route to Barcelona was renamed Freccia Azzurra sky-blue arrow).

According to the aforementioned Rob Mulder, in 1931 - in terms of passengers carried - the best service (with 2,262 passengers) was the one between Rome and Genoa, followed by Rome–Naples–Palermo with 2,540 passengers. The link from Siracusa to the city of Tripoli (in those years Libya was dominated by Italy) was also a popular one and good for 1,392 passengers and 3,876 kgs of mail.

In 1934, the airline merged with Aero Espresso Italiana, SISA-Società Italiana Servizi Aerei and SAM-Società Aerea Mediterranea, to form Ala Littoria, the pre-WWII flag airline of Italy.

== Fleet ==
- 19 x Dornier Do J "Wal" (12 passengers)
- 6 x Dornier Do R "Super Wal" (12 passengers)
- Dornier Do X (66 passengers, 2 options)

== See also ==
- List of defunct airlines of Italy
