= Caproni Ca.103 =

Italian 1920s bomber aircraft

Ca.103

General information
- Type: Bomber
- Manufacturer: Caproni
- Number built: 1

History
- First flight: 1929

The Caproni Ca.103 was a biplane twin-engine bomber developed by the Italian company Aeronautica Caproni in the late 1920s.

== Design ==
The Ca.103 had a fuselage, with a rectangular section and made of welded tubes, that integrated the two-seater closed cockpit placed at the wing connection edge and intercommunicating with the three positions for machine guns and pointer. On the rear, it ended up with a single drift fletching equipped with horizontal counter-braced sesquiplane planes, connected to each other by a pair of "V-shaped" uprights, and with the lower plane with adjustable incidence in flight. The wing configuration was sesquiplane inverted with neutral scaling, i.e. with a higher wing plane with a significantly shorter opening and positioned directly above the lower one, the latter being the only one with a differential slit aileron . The wings, both characterized by a sensitive positive dihedral angle, were connected to each other by a series of riser pairs in Warren truss configuration. The landing gear had a fixed classic tricycle configuration, with a front element with an interrupted axle and an elastic upright, with uncovered wheels equipped with brakes, integrated at the back by a swiveling support wheel which was also elastically cushioned.

== Specifications ==
Data from Aeroplani Caproni dal 1908 al 1935

General characteristics

- Length: 14.5 m (47 ft 7 in)
- Wingspan: 23 m (75 ft 6 in)
- Height: 6 m (19 ft 8 in)
- Wing area: 130 m^{2} (1,400 sq ft)
- Empty weight: 4,200 kg (9,259 lb)
- Gross weight: 6,700 kg (14,771 lb)
- Powerplant: 2 × Fiat A.24 V-12 water-cooled piston engines, 560 kW (750 hp) each
- Propellers: 2-bladed pusher and tractor propellers

Performance

- Maximum speed: 200 km/h (120 mph, 110 kn)
- Service ceiling: 6,000 m (20,000 ft)

Armament

- Guns: 3 × 7.7 mm (0.303 in) machine guns
- Bombs: 1,000 kg (2,200 lb) of bombs

== See also ==
Related lists

- List of Interwar military aircraft
