= Aeralpi =

Italian airline

- Founded: 1962
- Commenced operations: August 1962
- Ceased operations: 1968
- Hubs: Cortina d'Ampezzo
- Secondary hubs: Venice
- Focus cities: Milan, Venice
- Fleet size: 13
- Headquarters: Verona
- Key people: count Cesare d'Acquarone President Lionello Fabriani Managing Director

Aeralpi is a defunct airline based in Italy. It was Italy's first regional (or "third-level") airline, founded in still pioneering years. It encountered operational difficulties and opposition, even from political parties.

== History ==
Aeralpi was founded in the spring of 1962 on the initiative of Cesare Rosà - deputy mayor of Cortina d'Ampezzo and also an experienced pilot - and with the support of several investors, including Giovanni Ferrari and Umberto Klinger (director of the Officine Aeronavali of Venice), all convinced that it would be an excellent tool for facilitating tourist traffic to and from the picturesque alpine town. The company began operating experimental flights in the summer from to Bolzano, Venice, and Milan (Linate airport) with the basic but robust Pilatus PC-6 "Porter", the only aircraft that could operate safely from the rustic grassy strip set up parallel to a torrent. Subsequently, flights were also started between Venice and Asiago, Cortina and Bologna, and from Belluno to Milan. The first year's results were modest but significant: 678 passengers, 136 hours of flight, and over 23,000 flown kilometers.

In September 1964, the small (but fully equipped) Fiames airport in Cortina was inaugurated, and the following year, flights to Milan (with onward continuation to Genoa), to Jesolo village, the Milan-Albenga, and the Milan-Cinquale (the reference airport for the twin cities of Massa and Carrara) were added. Over the course of 12 months, over 7,000 passengers were transported.

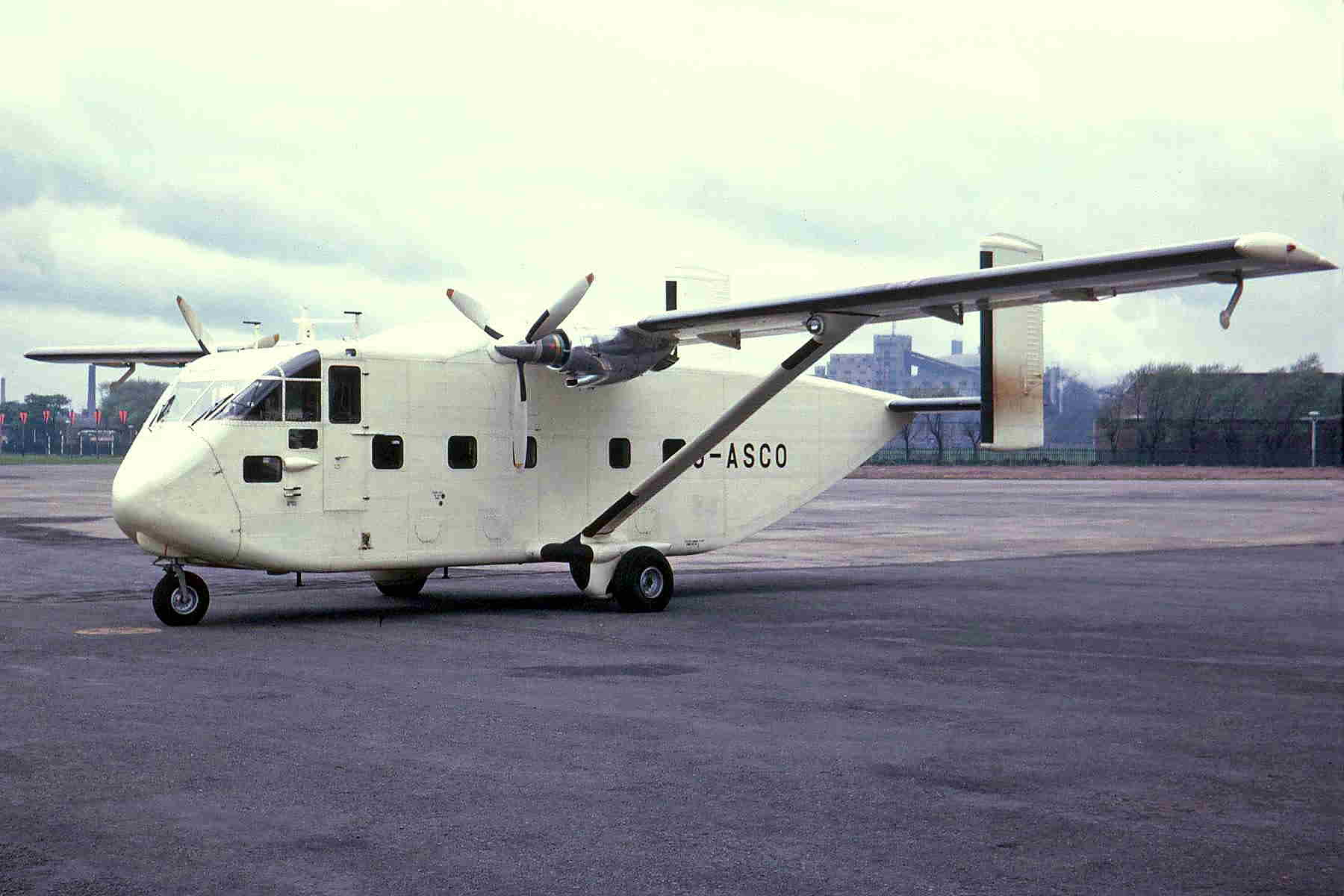
Short SC.7 Skyvan still with UK registration shortly before lease-purchase

In 1965, the headquarter was moved to Verona, while a small technical base to support the fleet had already been operating in Venice airport for some time. At the same time, count Cesare d'Acquarone joined the shareholders group. The encouraging growth in traffic, however, now had to be accompanied by aircraft capable of offering greater capacity and on-board comfort but also capable of operating safely in the challenging mountain environment. Thus, the Porters were used only for on-demand flights, while on the regular routes (inaugurated in 1966) the equally robust and versatile DeHavilland Canada DHC-6 "Twin Otter", with 19 seats and engines producing over 1,500 HP, entered service. The selection for the renewal of the fleet had also included the Short SC.7 Skyvan, better suited for the transport of goods in remote areas. In 1966, these aircraft were used for relief operations in the nation's flood-stricken areas in the northwest regions. The network of regular services expanded to include the Milan-Elba Island, Venice-Bologna, Venice-Trieste (this one on behalf of Alitalia) route, and the experimental Milan-St. Moritz one. In 1967, Fiorenza de Bernardi, daughter of the celebrated flying ace Mario de Bernardi and Italy's first commercial aviation rated female pilot, was hired.

In March, two serious accidents occurred shortly after each other. On the 6th, a Skyvan, returning from a training flight, impacted the breakwater at Venice's airport, fortunately without any casualties. On the 11th, a DHC-6 Twin Otter crashed into Col Visentin, near the Fadalto saddle, during a flight between Venice and Cortina.

Beyond the fleet innovations, the operational (meteorological) difficulties that accompanied the company's life were evident. The mountain airports/airfields did not allow instrument flights, and operations could only be carried out in good visibility. However, a crime story sealed Aeralpi's fate: the killing of count Acquarone by his mother-in-law on January 4, 1968, in circumstances that have never been fully clarified. The death of the major shareholder triggered an irreversible crisis, while unjustified criticism arose around the company from some industrialists and even politicians. Aeralpi made its last flight on June 30. In the following months, the Fiames airport was progressively abandoned and, years later, the macadam runway was used for car tests.

== Fleet ==
Aeralpi fleet consisted of the following aircraft:

Aircraft type	Total	In service	Struck off	Remarks
Pilatus PC-6 "Porter"	5	1963	1966	
DeHavilland Canada DHC-6 "Twin Otter"	6	1967	1968	
Short SC.7 Skyvan	2	1966	1968	Firstly on lease-purchase

== Incidents and accidents ==
1. 6 March 1967 - Skyvan I-TORE, returning from a training flight, impacted the breakwater at Venice's airport, fortunately without any casualties.
2. 11 March 1967 - DHC-6 Twin Otter I-CLAI crashed into Col Visentin, near the Fadalto saddle, during a flight between Venice and Cortina. The cause of the accident was attributed to adverse weather conditions and fog. The two crew members and two of the three passengers on board were killed.
