= Fiat BRG =

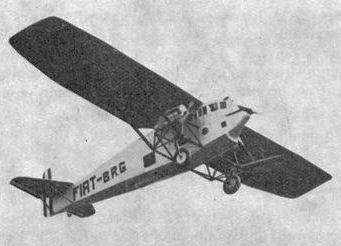

General information
- Type: Heavy bomber
- Manufacturer: Fiat
- Primary user: Italian Air Force
- Number built: 1

History
- First flight: 1930s

The Fiat BRG was an Italian heavy bomber prototype built in the 1930s by Fiat for the Italian Air Force.

== Design and development ==
The BRG (Bombardiere Rosatelli Gigante, "Giant Rosatelli Bomber") was a three-engine strut-braced high-wing monoplane. It had a deep slab-sided fuselage with one engine in the nose and two strut-mounted engines between the upper wing and a short stub wing attached to the lower fuselage. The BRG had a single fin and rudder and a wide-track landing gear. The pilot and co-pilot had a cabin forward of the wing leading edge. The aircraft was fitted with four machine guns, located in an open dorsal cockpit and a ventral tunnel. After testing in 1931 the prototype BRG was attached to 62 Squadriglia SPB, an experimental heavy bomber squadron.

== Operators ==
Kingdom of Italy

- Regia Aeronautica
  - 62 Squadrigilia SPB

== Specifications ==
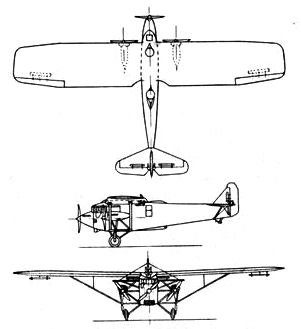
Fiat BRG 3-view drawing from L'Aerophile October 1932

Data from The Illustrated Encyclopedia of Aircraft (Part Work 1982-1985), 1985, Orbis Publishing, Page 1780

General characteristics

- Length: 17.60 m (57 ft 9 in)
- Wingspan: 30 m (98 ft 5 in)
- Height: 5.80 m (19 ft 0.25 in)
- Wing area: 139.15 m^{2} (1,497.85 sq ft)
- Empty weight: 6,600 kg (14,455 lb)
- Gross weight: 12,000 kg (26,455 lb)
- Powerplant: 1 × Fiat A.24 R 12-cylinder vee piston , 537 kW (720 hp)
- Powerplant: 2 × Fiat A.24 12-cylinder vee piston , 522 kW (700 hp) each

Performance

- Maximum speed: 240 km/h (149 mph, 129 kn)
- Endurance: 12 hours 0 minutes
- Service ceiling: 4,800 m (15,750 ft)

Armament

- 4 × 7.7 mm (0.303 in) machine guns
- 2,000 kg (4,409 lb) of bombs
