= Breda Ba.44 =

Biplane airliner developed in Italy

Ba.44
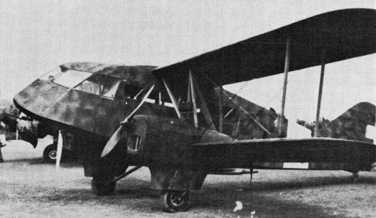
- A Ba.44 in Regia Aeronautica (Italian Royal Air Force) camouflage.

General information
- Type: Airliner
- Manufacturer: Società Italiana Ernesto Breda
- Primary user: Ala Littoria
- Number built: 6

History
- First flight: 1934
- Developed from: de Havilland DH.89

The Breda Ba.44 was a biplane airliner developed in Italy in the mid-1930s and which saw limited military service when impressed into the Regia Aeronautica as transports.

== Design and development ==
The design of the Ba.44 was developed from that of the de Havilland Dragon Rapide, for which Breda had purchased a manufacturing licence. Breda engineers believed that making some changes would better suit the aircraft to the company's manufacturing techniques, the biggest differences in the prototype Ba.44 being the design of the cockpit and empennage, and the change to locally produced Colombo S.63 engines. In production, however, these were changed back to the same de Havilland Gipsy Six engines as the Dragon Rapide.

== Operational history ==
Four examples were purchased by Ala Littoria, which utilized it on its Albanian routes, while the prototype was sold to the Regia Aeronautica, which deployed it as a VIP transport and air ambulance in Libya. The pleasing performance of the aircraft in this role led to the air force impressing the civil Ba.44s in 1936.

The government of Paraguay purchased one Ba.44 for its Military Aviation in 1933 and it was used as an air ambulance/transport in the Chaco War. In 1945, this Ba.44 was transferred to the first Paraguayan Airline, L.A.T.N. (Líneas Aéreas de Transporte Nacional) and was withdrawn from service in 1947.

Besides North Africa, the Ba.44s saw service in the Italian campaigns in Albania, Greece, and Yugoslavia.

== Operators ==
Kingdom of Italy

- Ala Littoria received 4 aircraft, all were taken over by military aviation.
- Regia Aeronautica received prototype and took over four civilian aircraft in 1936.

Paraguay

- Paraguayan Air Arm bought one aircraft in air ambulance/transport variant.
- Líneas Aéreas de Transporte Nacional (LATN) used one ex-Paraguayan Air Arm Ba.44.

== Specifications ==
General characteristics

- Crew: 1, pilot
- Capacity: 9 passengers
- Length: 10.50 m (34 ft 5 in)
- Wingspan: 14.65 m (48 ft 1 in)
- Height: 3.20 m (10 ft 6 in)
- Wing area: 31.2 m^{2} (336 sq ft)
- Empty weight: 1,520 kg (3,350 lb)
- Gross weight: 2,820 kg (6,220 lb)
- Powerplant: 2 × de Havilland Gipsy Six inverted inlines , 138 kW (185 hp) each

Performance

- Maximum speed: 248 km/h (155 mph, 135 kn)
- Range: 860 km (536 mi, 466 nmi)
- Service ceiling: 5,800 m (19,000 ft)

== See also ==
Related development

- de Havilland Dragon Rapide

Related lists

- List of aircraft of World War II

== Bibliography ==
- Sapienza, Antonio Luis (June 2000). "Les premiers avions de transport commercial au Paraguay" [The First Commercial Transport Aircraft in Paraguay]. Avions: Toute l'Aéronautique et son histoire (in French) (87): 45–47. ISSN 1243-8650.
- Sapienza Fracchia, Antonio Luis: "La Contribución Italiana en la Aviación Paraguaya". Author's edition. Asunción. 2007.
- Taylor, Michael J. H. (1989). Jane's Encyclopedia of Aviation. London: Studio Editions. p. 195.
