= Fiat A.24 =

1920s Italian piston aircraft engine

A.24
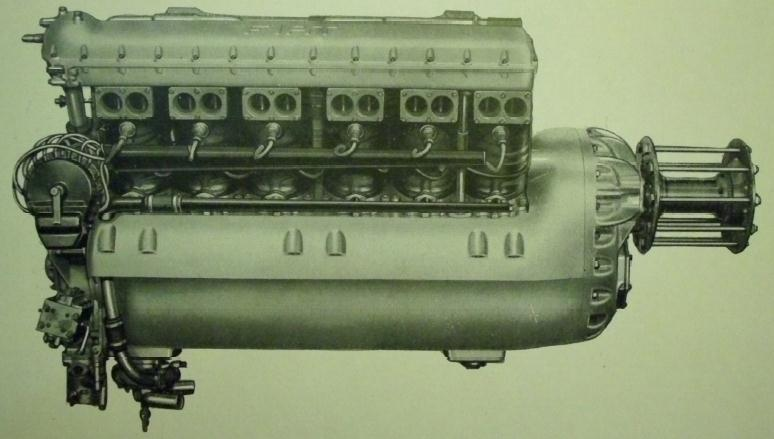
- A.24R
- Type: Water-cooled V12
- Manufacturer: Fiat Aviazione
- First run: c.1926
- Number built: at least 100

The Fiat A.24 was an Italian water-cooled V12 aircraft engine from the 1920s.

== Design and development ==
During the second half of the 1920s Fiat introduced several water-cooled aircraft engines, including the A.20, A.22, A24, A.25 and A.30. They were all upright V12s with 60° between the cylinder banks; capacities ranged between 18.7 L and 54.5 L (1,141-3,326 cu in) and power outputs between 320 kW and 745 kW (430-1,000 hp). Producing 520 kW (700 hp) from 32.3 L (1,971 cu in), the A.24 was near the center of this range.

When Fiat was advised by the Italian government to simplify their water-cooled product line, they decided to focus on the A.20, A.22 and A.30 models such that the A.24 was not manufactured in large numbers.

== Variants ==
A.24
Initial version, ungeared.
A.24 R.
Geared output.

== Applications ==
From Thompson.

- CMASA MF.5
- Fiat BRG
- Savoia-Marchetti S.55A
- Savoia-Marchetti S.66

== Specifications (A.24R) ==
Data from Jane's All the World's Aircraft 1938.

=== General characteristics ===
- Type: water-cooled 60° upright V12
- Bore: 140 mm (5.51 in)
- Stroke: 175 mm (6.89 in)
- Displacement: 32.3 L (1,971 cu in)
- Length: 1.770 m (69.69 in)
- Width: 735 mm (28.9 in)
- Height: 1.065 m (41.93 in)
- Dry weight: Dry 550 kg (1,213 lb)

=== Components ===
- Valvetrain: Two overhead camshafts, geared together, driving two inlet and two exhaust valves per cylinder. Housed under aluminium casings.
- Fuel system: Twin water heated Fiat carburetters mounted between cylinder banks, one serving each bank. Two spark plugs per cylinder, placed horizontally and opposite each other, supplied by two Marelli MF.12 magnetos.
- Oil system: One delivery pump and two scavenge pumps, in a single unit.
- Cooling system: water, with centrifugal pump.
- Reduction gear: 1.545:1 spur gear, lubricated via oil spout.
- Cylinders: Forged steel barrels, with closed, flat ends.
- Pistons: Aluminium alloy, two compression rings and two scraper rings above fully floating gudgeon pin.
- Crankshaft: Each six throw, seven bearings.
- Crankcase: Each an aluminium casting, split below crankshaft centre line. Bolted-on duralumin end caps.

=== Performance ===
- Power output: 520 kW (700 hp) at 2,000 rpm, continuous.
- Compression ratio: 5.7:1
- Fuel consumption: 0.302 kg/kWh (0.496 lb/hph)

== See also ==
Related lists

- List of aircraft engines
