= Imperial Line =

Flight route

The Imperial Line from Rome to Addis Ababa, from a 1937 promotional map by Ala Littoria

The Imperial Line (Italian: Linea dell'Impero, Linea Imperiale) was a flight route of the Italian national airline Ala Littoria between 1935 and 1941 during the Fascist era. It was the longest route in the Italian colonial empire in Africa and "the jewel in Ala Littoria's crown". It connected Rome with Benghazi (Libya), Asmara (Eritrea), Addis Abeba (Ethiopia) and Mogadishu (Somalia). It carried passengers and mail. Italy ultimately lost control of the route during World War II.

According to Federico Caprotti, "The celebration of colonial air links ... can be seen as playing into modern connotations of speed, progress, and reach, as well as aspirations to superiority. ... [T]he geographical imaginations evinced through the airline's documents and visual materials are deeply modern in their celebration of technological prowess and the domination of nature and space."

== Development ==
Ala Littoria's service to East Africa was inaugurated in 1935 under the name Linea dell'Impero. On 7 July 1935 a memorandum of agreement was signed with Imperial Airways, a private British firm, whereby they would carry Ala Littoria passengers from Brindisi in southern Italy as far as Khartoum in the Sudan (via Cairo in Egypt). This was the first leg of Imperial Airways' route from Europe to South Africa. From Khartoum, Ala Littoria's passengers would transfer to its own aircraft and fly on to Kassala (Sudan), Asmara (Eritrea), Massawa (Eritrea), Djibouti (French Somaliland), Berbera (British Somaliland), Bura Galadi (British Kenya) and Mogadishu (Italian Somaliland). Full passenger service from Rome to Mogadishu opened in November 1935. By March 1937, service had been added to Gorrahei (Ethiopia) and Beledweyne (Somalia).

The Imperial Line was not a quick route. From Rome to Massawa took three days. Ala Littoria's chief executive, Umberto Klinger, claimed optimistically to Il Messaggero in 1936 that the route from Rome to Mogadishu took just three and a half days. Following the Italian conquest of Ethiopia, Addis Abeba was added to the route. The opening of the route from Rome to Addis Abeba via Cairo was delayed by the negotiations with the Egyptian government concerning flyover rights. The first two flights from Cairo to Addis Abeba even flew without permits.

By October 1937, there were four weekly flights leaving Rome for Asmara and Addis Abeba, while Asmara had two weekly to Djibouti and another two weekly to Mogadishu (both via Assab and Dire Dawa). The timetable for the Imperial Line was less precise owing the longer flight times. Departures were usually scheduled for 10:15 a.m. at Rome, but arrivals were only given as dawn, morning or afternoon.

== Airports and aircraft ==
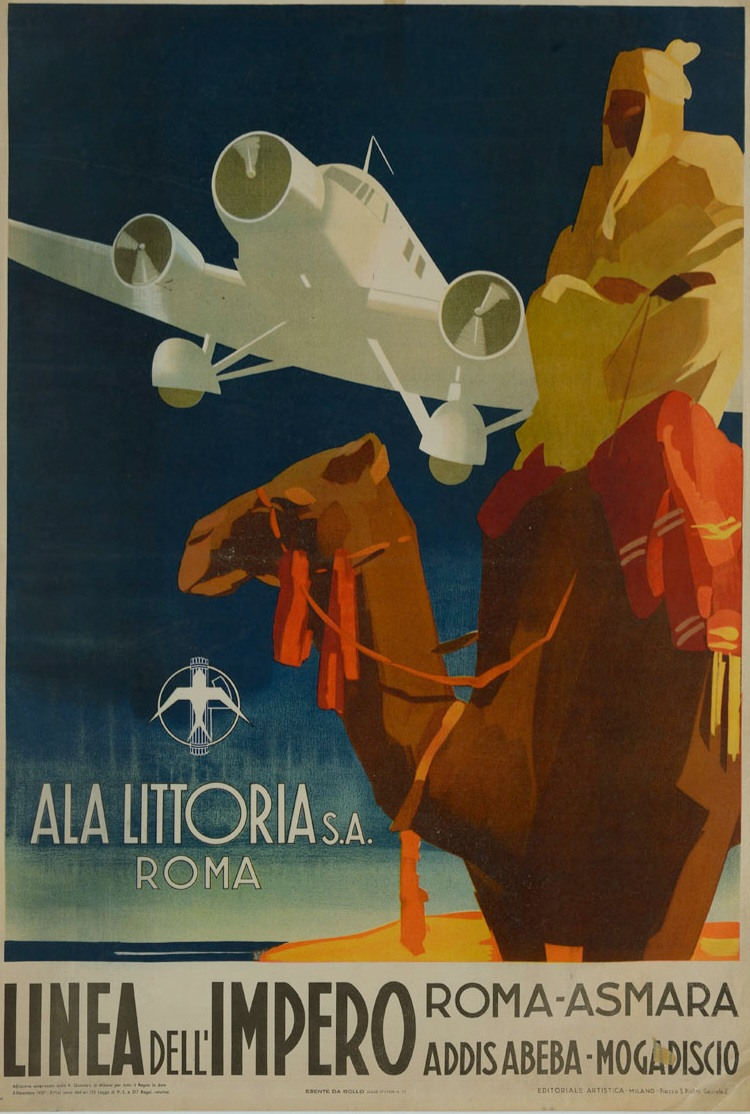
Poster advertising the Imperial Line

Airstrips in Italy's African colonies were mostly hot and high and the Imperial Line was more dangerous than European routes. The greater distance between airstrips in East Africa also contributed to a higher fatality rate on Imperial Line flights, with 40% of accidents resulting in deaths as opposed to 20% on European flights.

Besides land-based aircraft, the Imperial Line operated seaplanes for use on coastal routes and operating out of lakes and rivers. By 1938, the trip from Rome direct to Benghazi was accomplished by a Cant Z.506 seaplane, while the leg from Benghazi to Addis Abeba by a Savoia-Marchetti S.73. Both were trimotors. All the machines that flew the Imperial Line used foreign-built engines save for one S.73 that had an Alfa Pegaso and one Fokker F.VII trimotor that flew within East Africa and was equipped with an Alfa D.2.

Along the Imperial Line, there were maintenance bases at Rome, Brindisi, Benghazi and Asmara.

== Passengers and revenues ==
The Imperial Line's East African network had the highest revenues of any of Ala Littoria's route networks, about 44 million lire annually in 1936–37. It had the highest passenger revenues (9 million) and the highest mail revenues (35 million), and was the only network with higher mail revenue than passenger. This despite the fact that it carried fewer passengers than the other networks, only about 5,000 annually.

== Bibliography ==
- Caprotti, Federico. "Profitability, Practicality and Ideology: Fascist Civil Aviation and the Short Life of Ala Littoria, 1934–1943." The Journal of Transport History 32.1 (2011): 17–38.
- Caprotti, Federico. "Visuality, Hybridity, and Colonialism: Imagining Ethiopia through Colonial Aviation, 1935–1940." Annals of the Association of American Geographers 101.2 (2011): 380–403.
- Finch, Robert. The World's Airways. University of London Press, 1938.
