= Società Aerea Mediterranea =

Defunct airline of Italy (1928–1981)

IATA	ICAO	Call sign
—	MQ	—
- Founded: Part 1: 26 March 1928; Part 2: 3 December 1959
- Ceased operations: Part 1: 1939; Part 2: 1981
- Parent company: Ala Littoria (1928–1939); Alitalia (1959–1981)
- Headquarters: Via Regina Elena 29, Rome, Italy

Società Aerea Mediterranea (SAM) was an Italian cargo and passenger airline based in Rome, Italy, which operated between 1928 and 1939 as subsidiary of Ala Littoria and between 1959 and 1981 as subsidiary of Alitalia. It was founded on 26 March 1928 as a government initiative of the Secretary of State for Air Italo Balbo with the aim to take the control of all private airline and rationalize all domestic and international routes.

It was relaunched on 3 December 1959 as a non-IATA Alitalia subsidiary to operate IT flights, together with local cargo and secondary domestic passenger services on behalf of the parent company. The latter were transferred to Aero Trasporti Italiani in 1964 and the company concentrated on charter operations introducing jet service in 1968. SAM ceased operations at the end of 1976 and was put on liquidation on 1981.

== Historical fleet ==
=== Pre-WWII fleet ===
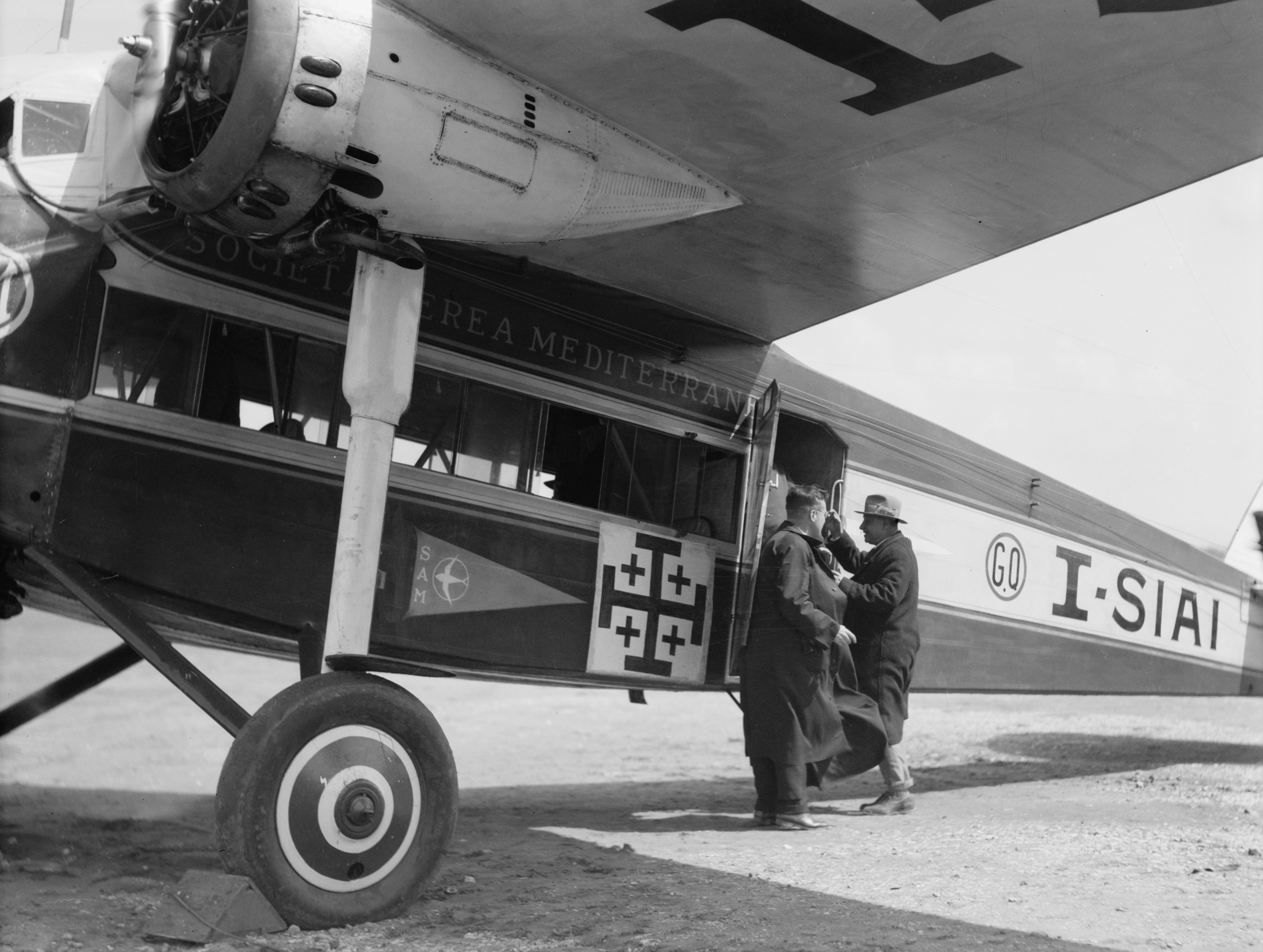
A Vatican representative disembarking from a SAM Fokker F.VII at Ramla in 1933

- Breda Ba.44
- CANT 22
- Fokker F.VII
- Savoia-Marchetti S.55
- Savoia-Marchetti S.63

=== "Alitalia" period fleet ===
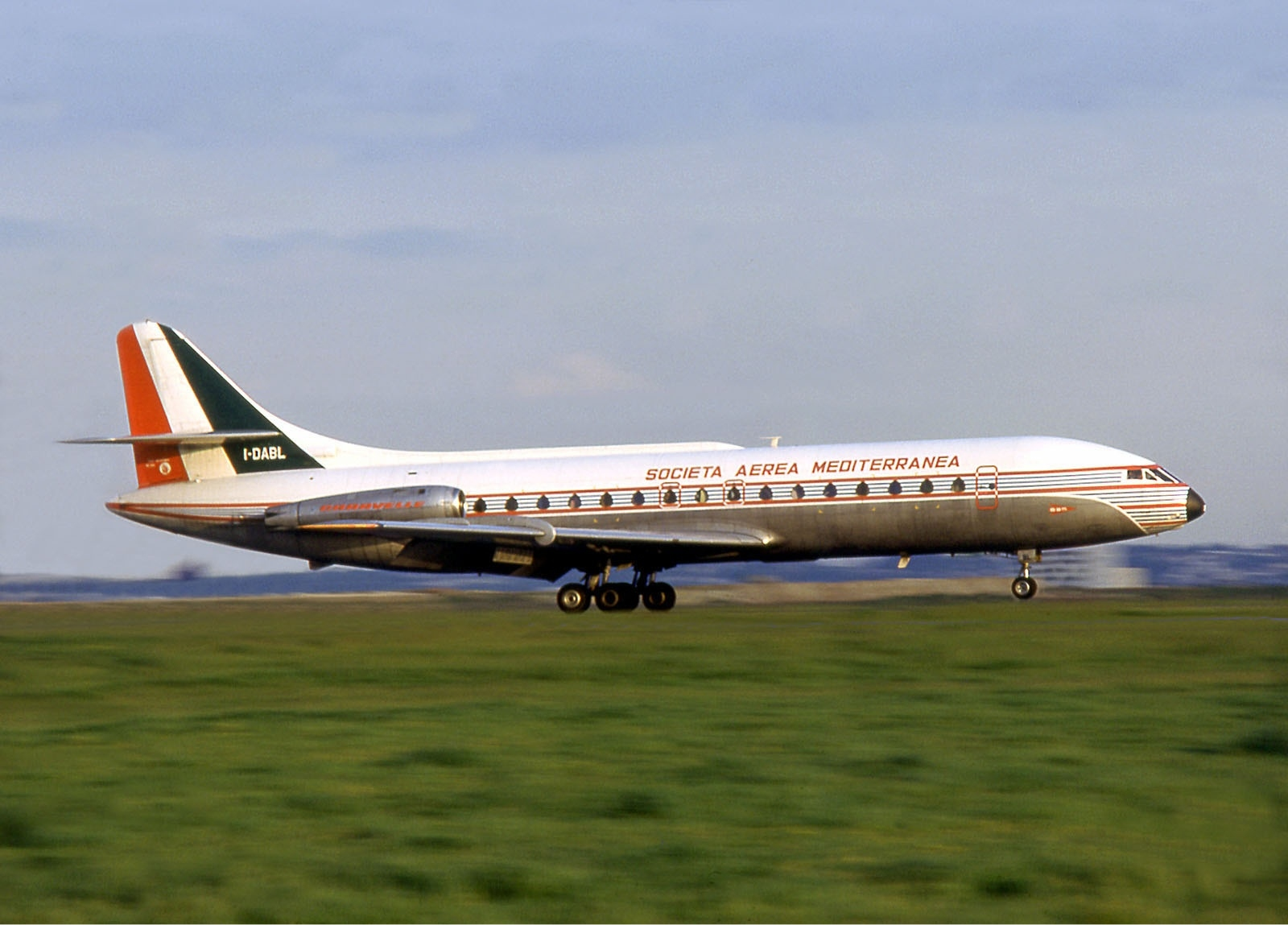
Sud Aviation Caravelle of SAM in 1974.

- Curtiss-Wright C-46 Commando
- Douglas DC-3
- Douglas DC-6
- Sud Aviation Caravelle

== Accidents ==
On 8 March 1962, a Douglas DC-6B aircraft (registration I-DIMO) returning to Leonardo da Vinci-Fiumicino Airport from Khartoum International Airport in Sudan crashed into Monte Velino. All five crew members died in the accident, which may have been caused by interference from transmitting stations.
