= Savoia-Marchetti S.55 =

Flying boat in the Royal Italian Air Force

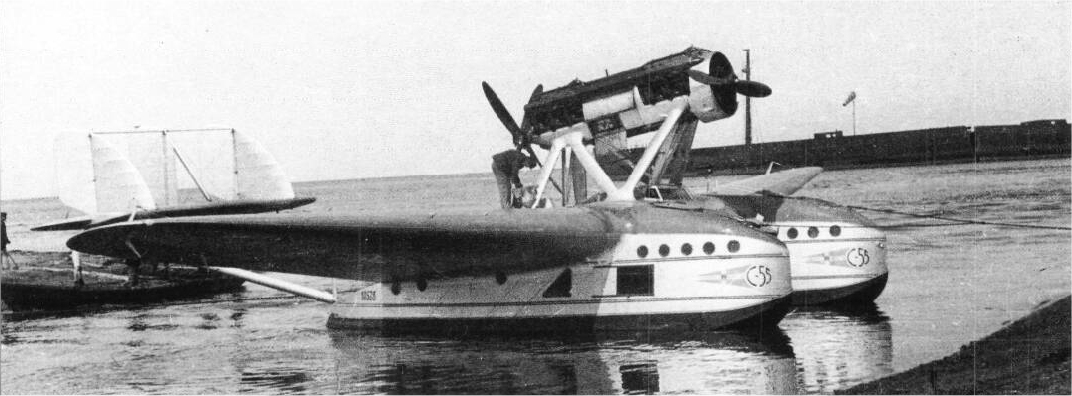
- An S.55P of Aeroflot circa 1933

General information
- Type: Flying boat
- Manufacturer: Savoia-Marchetti
- Designer: Alessandro Marchetti
- Primary users: Società Idrovolanti Alto Italia (Savoia) Regia Aeronautica; Spanish Air Force; Royal Romanian Naval Aviation
- Number built: 243+

History
- Introduction date: 1926
- First flight: August 1924
- Retired: 1943

The Savoia-Marchetti S.55 is a twin-engine twin-hull monoplane flying boat designed and produced by the Italian aircraft manufacturer Savoia-Marchetti. It filled both commercial and military roles.

The S.55 first flew in August 1924 and S.55s were soon setting records for speed, payload, altitude and range, and they made a number of successful high profile Atlantic crossings, including the first mass formation crossings. Many saw service with the Regia Aeronautica and foreign operators including the Spanish Air Force as bombers and maritime patrol aircraft, while numerous airlines including Aeroflot also operated the type. Although some were still nominally in service at the start of the Second World War, they played no role due to their age and the last examples were struck off charge by 1943 in Italy and Romania.

== Design and development ==
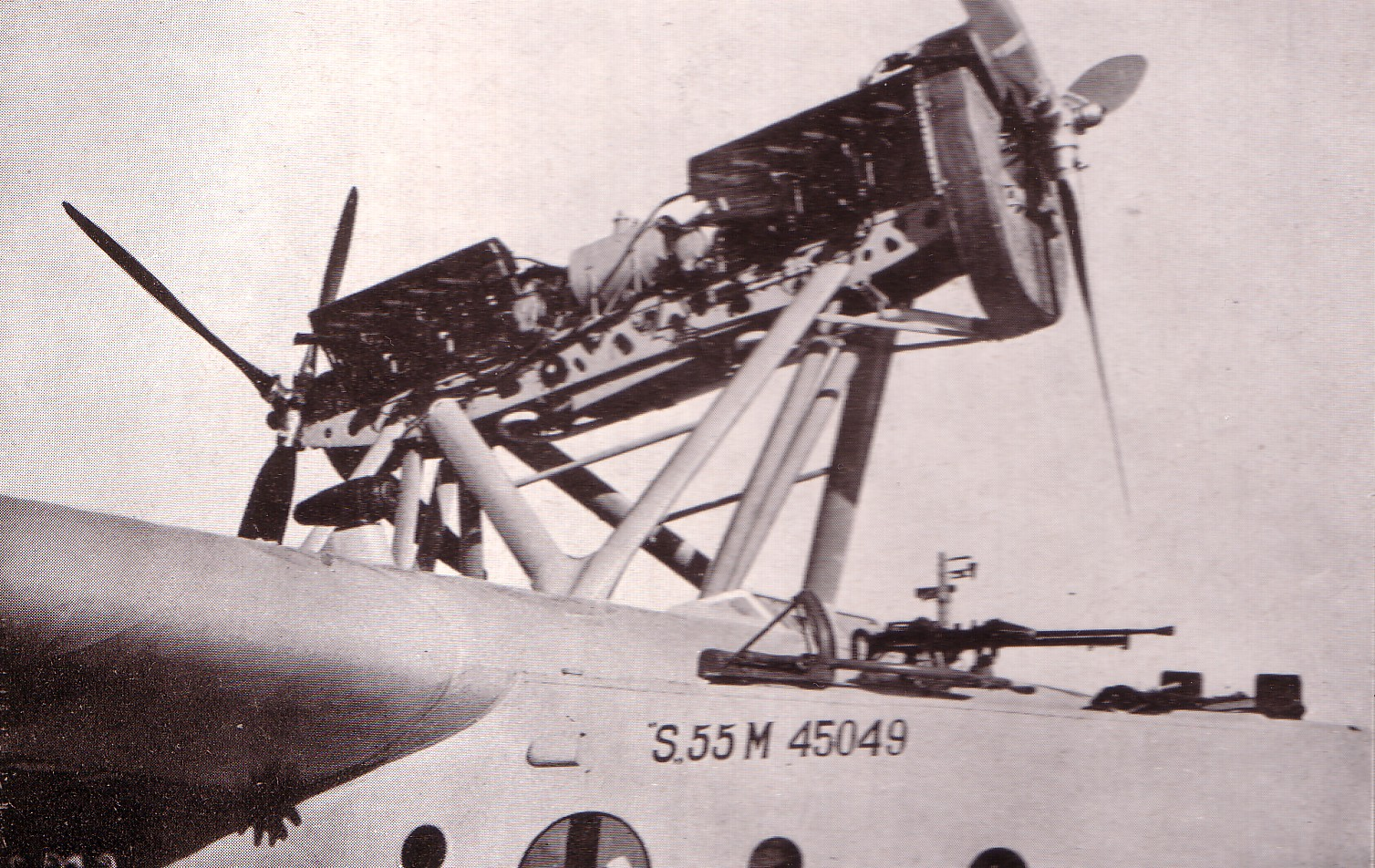
Typical S.55 engine installation - later examples had the nacelle enclosed in a streamlined fairing.

The Savoia-Marchetti S.55 is a twin-engine twin-hull cantilever-monoplane flying boat that was built in both commercial and military variants. Two airliner version, the S.55C and the S.55P were built, in which the passengers occupied the forward part of each hull. The military soon took interest, as the S.55 was especially suitable for the torpedo bomber role, since a heavy torpedo, which normally posed a problem for designers, could readily be slung between the hulls. Transportation and repair was facilitated as the S.55 could be readily dismantled as the hulls can be separated from the wing along with the tail unit, while the wings split into a centre section and two outer wing panels.

The hull centrelines are about 4.3 m (14 ft) apart, and the hulls run over half of the length of the aircraft. They have a single-step bottom, with a conventional vee form aft of the step, while ahead of the step the planing bottom is slightly concave, a common feature on Italian flying boats. The internal space can be configured into a series of cabins to accommodate up to 12 passengers, as with the S.55C. The cockpit is in the leading edge of the thick wing center section between the two hulls and there is a passageway between the cabins in each hull and the cockpit. Early versions had an open cockpit, while later ones were provided with an enclosed canopy. There are gunner's positions on military aircraft at bow and stern of each hull, while under the centre section there is a 2.6 m (8 ft 6 in) wide space suitable for torpedoes or mines. The three-spar outer wing sections have a pronounced dihedral and are tapered. The leading edges are swept back about 15 degrees while the trailing edge is angled forward slightly . The wing have aerodynamically balanced ailerons. Other than in the metalized S.55M variant, the structure of both the wing and hulls is primarily wood, with wood skinning.

The tail surfaces are supported by substantial booms attached to the hull sternposts and the wing's rear spar, while smaller frames provide additional bracing, and wires provide the crossbracing. On top of the rectangular horizontal tail are three rudders, with the outer two unbalanced rudders have fixed curved fins, and the inner rudder has an aerodynamic balance area on the leading edge.

The S.55 is powered by two air-cooled V-12 piston engines in a tandem push-pull pair, mounted over the wing centre section. A single radiator provides cooling for both engines, and the nacelle was neatly streamlined on later examples. The nacelle and line of thrust from the engines is inclined upward by 6 to 9 degrees, depending on the version, to improve take-off performance and handling. Level flight can be maintained on a single engine.

== Operational history ==
The S.55 prototype was first flown in August 1924, and by 1926 had set 14 separate world records for speed, altitude and distance with a payload. The type's greatest successes, however, were its many flights across the Atlantic.

The First aerial crossing of the South Atlantic was made in stages in 1922 using three different Fairey IIIs, and a subsequent crossing made by the Dornier Do J Plus Ultra in January 1926 ended in the Cape Verde Islands. A year later, the Santa Maria under Francesco de Pinedo completed the first S.55 crossing. After flying south to Bolama, then to Portuguese Guinea, until it was forced down at Cape Verde: however they reached Brazil on 23 February 1927. The aircraft was later traded to Brazil for coffee beans.

The Brazilian João Ribeiro de Barros and his crew of three made the first non-stop crossing in S.55 Jahú on 24 April 1927. Departing from Santiago Island, they crossed the Atlantic and landed at Fernando de Noronha Island, Brazil.

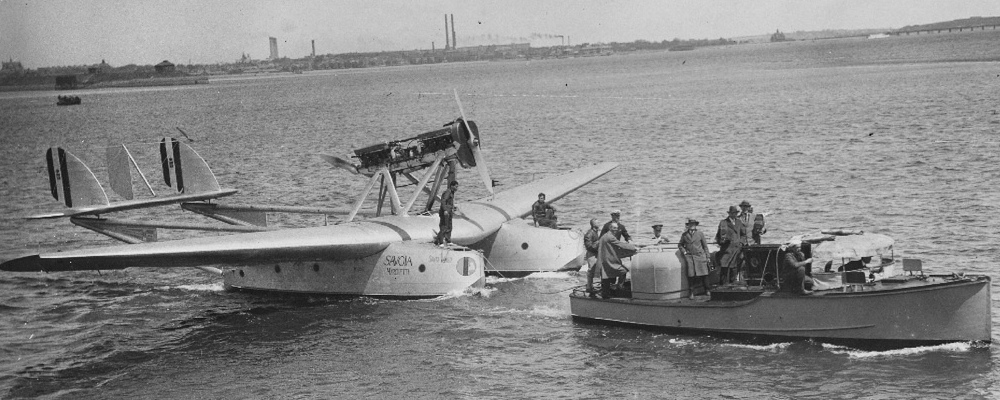
Pinedo's S.55 Santa Maria

Francesco de Pinedo and Carlo del Prete flew an S-55 from Sesto Calende, Italy on 13 February 1927 and four months later, on 16 June 1927, they returned, having flown nearly 48,280 km (30,000 mi) in 193 flying hours with just over 50 stops, including Rio de Janeiro, Buenos Aires and New York City.

On 20 June 1928, S.55 I-SAAT Santa Maria, piloted by Tenente Colonnello Umberto Maddalena of the Regia Aeronautica, located survivors of Arctic explorer Umberto Nobile's crashed airship Italia on an ice floe about 120 km (75 mi) from Nordaustlandet, Svalbard.

Italian Maresciallo dell'Aria (Air Marshal) Italo Balbo won fame for organizing multiple Atlantic crossings using a squadron of Regia Aeronautica S.55s. These culminated in a flight from Orbetello, Italy on 1 July 1933 with 24 aircraft to Chicago's Century of Progress International Exposition, in just over 48 hours, while maintaining formation. The term "Balbo" entered the English language as a term to describe a large formation of aircraft.

Large numbers of S.55s were operated by the Regia Aeronautica as a long-range bomber and patrol aircraft. By the Second World War, the S.55 was obsolete and only a few were still kept in reserve.

== Variants ==
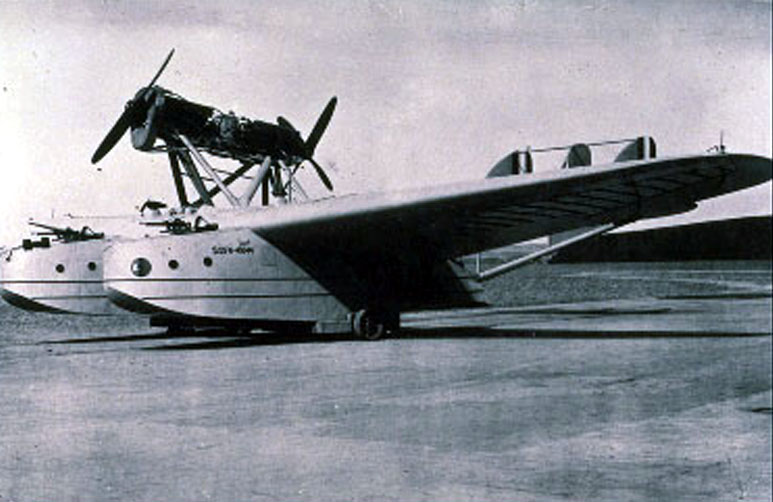
SIAI S.55M

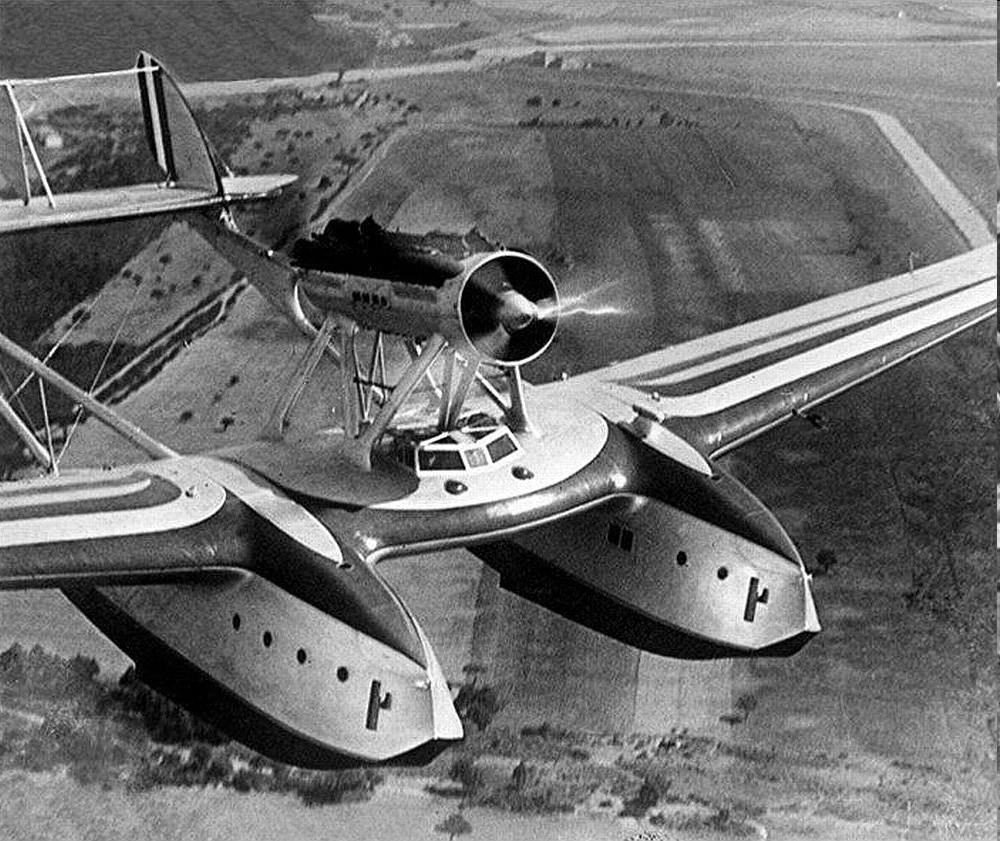
One of the S.55X aircraft used on Balbo's Transatlantic flight

S.55
Prototypes and initial production model. The first prototype was powered by two 220 kW (300 hp) Fiat A.12bis 6 cylinder inlines, the 2nd prototype with two 300 kW (400 hp) Lorraine 12Db V-12 engines, and production examples used two 380 kW (510 hp) Isotta Fraschini Asso 500 V-12 engines. 90 were built from 1927 to 1930, including the two prototypes.
S.55C Civile
Initial civil variant powered with two Lorraine 12ED V-12 engines. Eight built from 1925 to 1926.
S.55P Passeggeri
Improved civil variant with enclosed cockpits and taller hull for 10 passengers. Fitted with two 380 kW (510 hp) Isotta Fraschini Asso 500 or 370 kW (500 hp) Asso 500 Ri or 520 kW (700 hp) Fiat A.24 V-12 engines. 23 built from 1928 to 1932.
S.55A Atlantico
Military variant delivered with 418 kW (560 hp) Fiat A.22R engines, 16 built by Piaggio in 1930.
S.55M Metallico
Variant with wood structure replaced by metal, seven 370 kW (500 hp) Isotta Fraschini Asso 500Ri powered examples built by Piaggio in 1930.
S.55SA Scafo Allargato
Widened and deepened hulls and enclosed cockpits, powered by two 380 kW (510 hp) Isotta Fraschini Asso 500 or two 370 kW (500 hp) Asso 500 Ri V-12 engines. 16 built by Savoia-Marchetti and 16 built by CANT.
S.55SA Scafo Allargatissimo
Variant with greatly enlarged hulls powered with two 370 kW (500 hp) Asso 500 Ri V-12 engines. 20 built by Savoia-Marchetti, 16 by Macchi and six by CANT.
S.55X
Variant fitted with 700 kW (940 hp) Isotta Fraschini Asso 750 W-18 engines for North Atlantic formation flights, later armed and used as a reconnaissance-bomber. 25 built.
P1S
Brazilian Naval Aviation designation for S.55A.

== Operators ==
=== Civil operators ===
Kingdom of Italy

- Aero Espresso Italiana
- Società Aerea Mediterranea

Soviet Union

- Aeroflot

United States

- Aero Transport Company d.b.a. AirVia.
- Marine Air Transport Co.
- Alaska Airways

=== Military operators ===
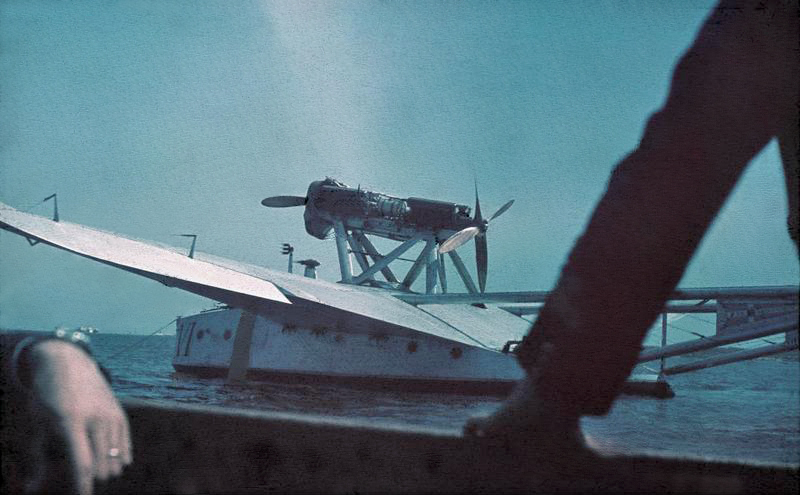
A Romanian S.55 in 1943

Kingdom of Italy

- Regia Aeronautica

Brazil

- Brazilian Navy (eight flying boats)

Spain (1937)

- Spanish Air Force

Romania

- Royal Romanian Naval Aviation (seven flying boats)

== Surviving aircraft ==
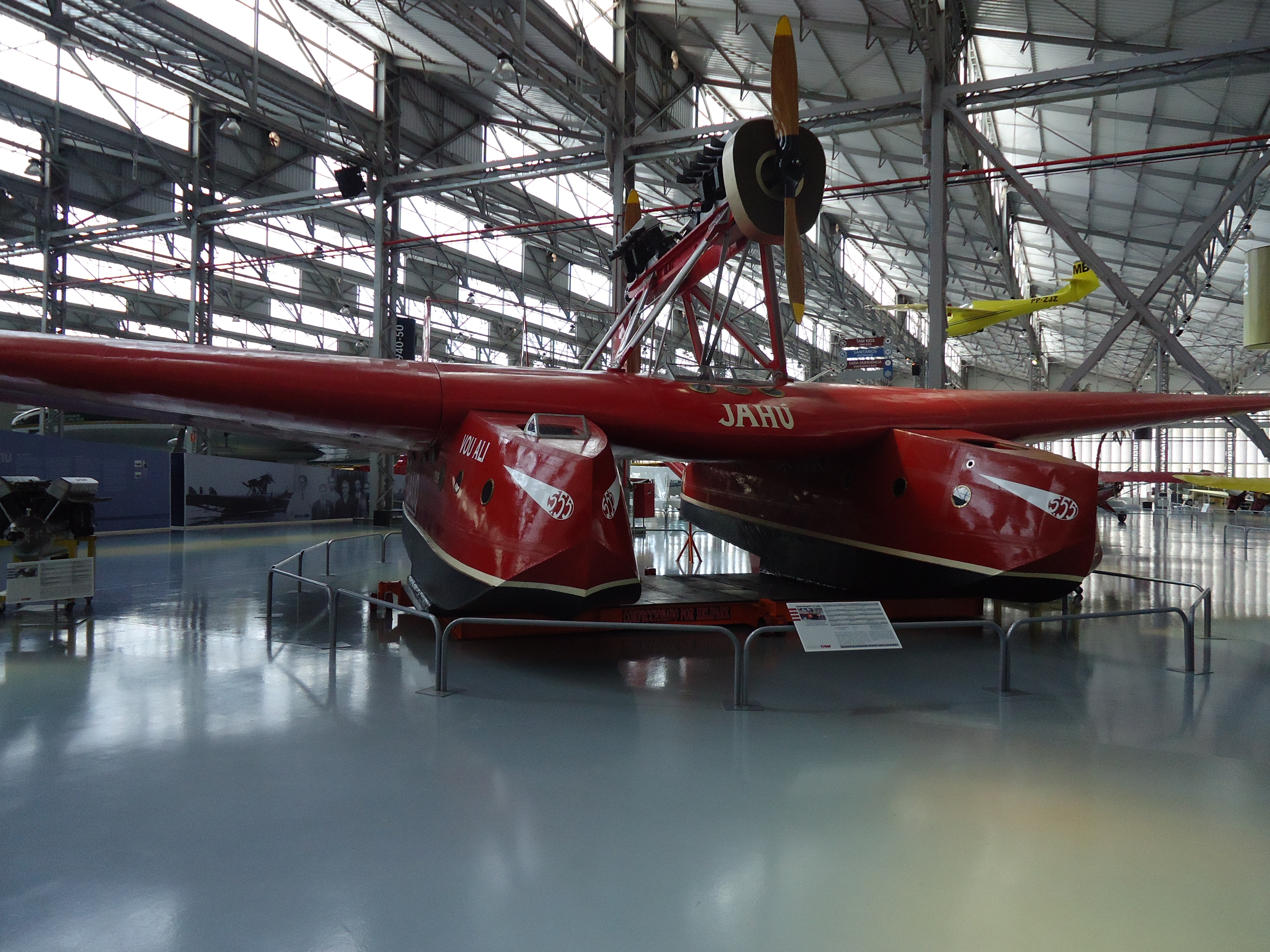
Savoia-Marchetti S.55, registration I-BAUQ at TAM Museum, São Paulo Brazil

The sole surviving example is preserved in Brazil following a recent extensive restoration at the TAM Asas de um sonho (Wings of a Dream Museum) museum, in São Carlos, São Paulo (state), Brazil. Commander João Ribeiro de Barros crossed the South Atlantic in 1927 in this S.55, which was painted red, named "Jahú" and registered as I-BAUQ.

A full-scale cut-away replica representing the S.55X that Italo Balbo made his 1933 Transatlantic formation crossing in, is on display at the Volandia Museum in Milan, Italy, having been built by the Savoia Marchetti Historical Group over a period of seven years, and involving over 8000 person-hours of work.

== Specifications (S.55) ==
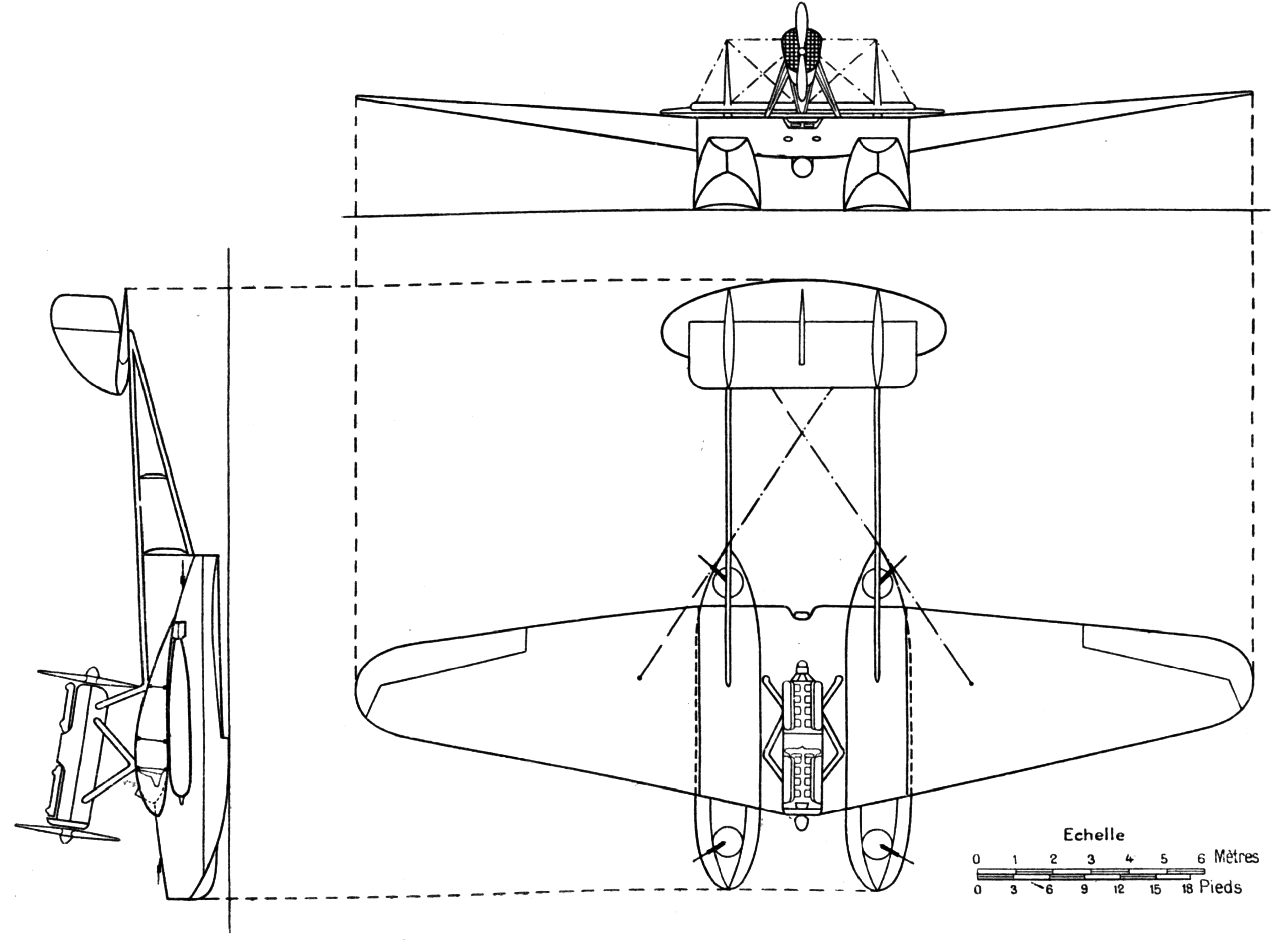

Data from Jane's all the World's Aircraft 1928, National Advisory Committee for Aeronautics

General characteristics

- Crew: Two pilots and 3-4 other crew members
- Length: 16.5 m (54 ft 2 in)
- Wingspan: 24 m (78 ft 9 in)
- Height: 5 m (16 ft 5 in)
- Wing area: 92 m^{2} (990 sq ft)
- Empty weight: 5,750 kg (12,677 lb)
- Max takeoff weight: 8,260 kg (18,210 lb)
- Powerplant: 2 × Isotta Fraschini Asso 500 V-12 water-cooled piston engines, 370 kW (500 hp) each mounted in tandem, plus one Garelli piston engine driving oil distribution placed between the two main engines
- Propellers: 2-bladed fixed pitch tractor and pusher propellers

Performance

- Maximum speed: 205 km/h (127 mph, 111 kn)
- Stall speed: 105 km/h (65 mph, 57 kn)
- Range: 1,200 km (750 mi, 650 nmi) to 2,200 km (1,400 mi; 1,200 nmi)
- Time to altitude: 1,000 m (3,300 ft) in 9 minutes; 2,000 m (6,600 ft) in 25 minutes; 3,000 m (9,800 ft) in 45 minutes

== See also ==
- Decennial Air Cruise

Related lists

- List of interwar military aircraft
- List of flying boats and floatplanes
