= People's =

Austro-Swiss airline

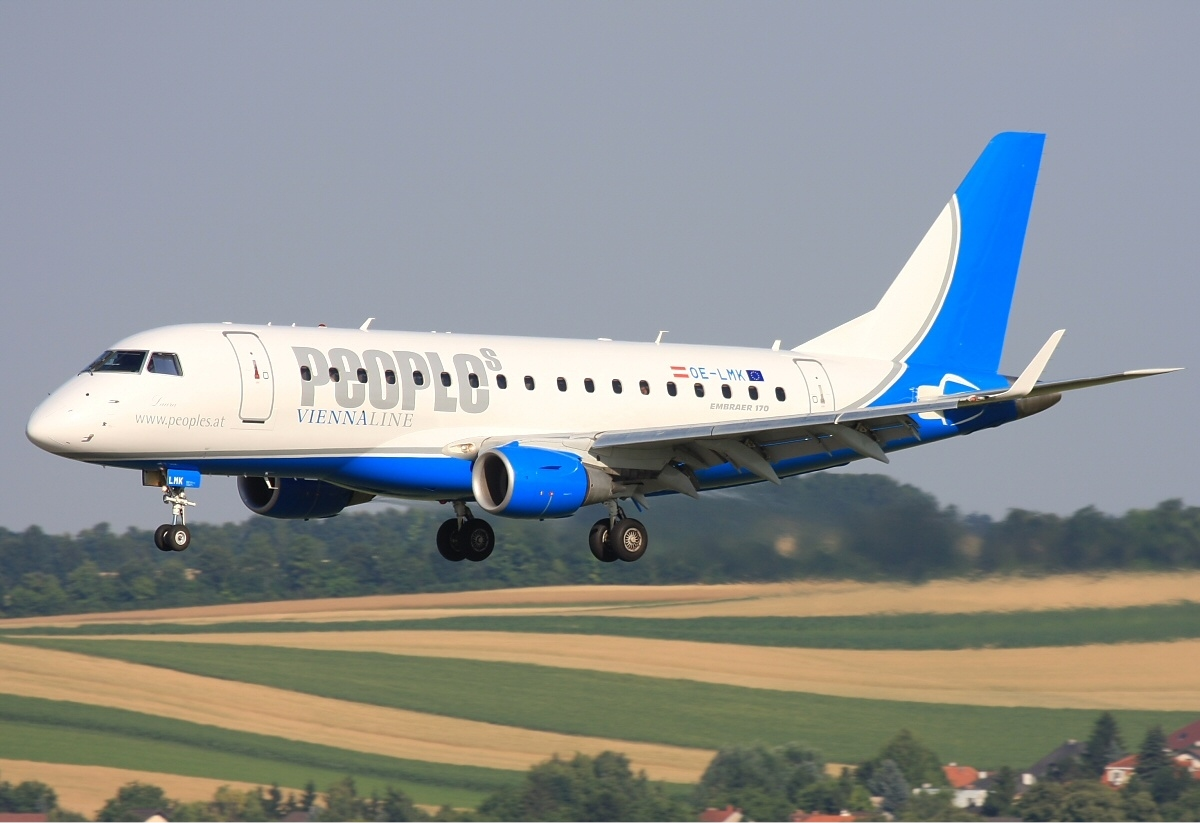
- Embraer 170
IATA	ICAO	Call sign
PE	PEV	PEOPLES
- Founded: 2010
- Commenced operations: 2011
- Operating bases: St. Gallen–Altenrhein Airport
- Fleet size: 1
- Destinations: 11
- Headquarters: Vienna, Austria
- Key people: Thomas Krutzler (CEO)
- Website: peoples.ch

People's, branded as People's ViennaLine until May 2018, and legally registered as Altenrhein Luftfahrt GmbH, is an Austro-Swiss airline headquartered in Vienna, Austria. It operates scheduled and charter passenger flights mainly from its base at St. Gallen-Altenrhein Airport in Switzerland.

== History ==
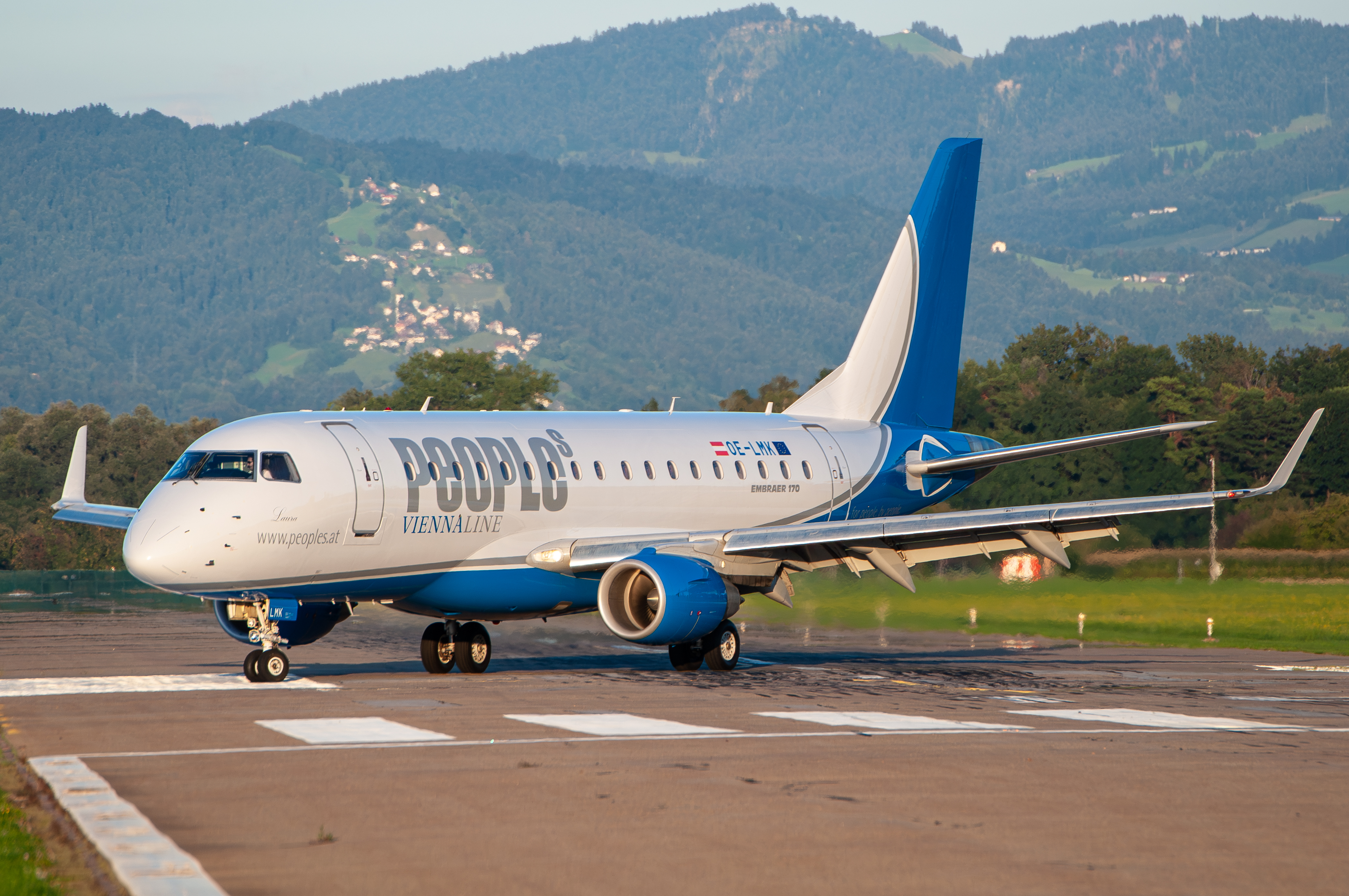
Embraer 170

People's Viennaline previous trademark

Founded as People's Viennaline in 2010, the first revenue flight took place on 27 March 2011. For several years, People's only operated a single scheduled route between St. Gallen and Vienna. However, the route network has since been expanded with some seasonal and charter services to some Mediterranean holiday areas.

In November 2016, People's inaugurated the world's shortest international jet route (after St. Maarten-Anguilla, second shortest international route overall). The flight from St. Gallen-Altenrhein Airport, Switzerland, to Friedrichshafen Airport, Germany, took only eight minutes over Lake Constance and was bookable individually. The airline faced severe criticism for this service from politicians and environmental organisations. This short leg was part of its then new St.Gallen/Altenrhein-Friedrichshafen-Cologne/Bonn service. However, this route was terminated entirely by mid-April 2017 due to low passenger numbers. Shortly after, the airline announced plans to terminate its last remaining route from Friedrichshafen to Vienna.

In May 2018, People's Viennaline announced a rebrand to the shortened People's in order to reflect their widened route network. In October 2019, the airline announced major restructuring measures mainly consisting of the phase-out of one of their two Embraer 170 regional jetliners and the closure of all charter operations departing from St. Gallen-Althenrhein airport. In October 2026 People's Airline announced they will use a new aircraft starting in March 2027. The new aircraft is a Dornier 328-100 with 32 seats. It produces less noise and CO₂ than the current aircraft. There will be three flights every weekday between Altenrhein and Vienna. On Sundays, there will be two flights per day. The new schedule starts on 28 March 2027. People's Airline will work more closely with other airlines, especially Private Wings. This will help make flights more reliable. Other airlines will take over the charter flights. These include Private Wings, Avanti Air, Frost and Helvetic Airways. Holiday flights from Altenrhein will still be available. During winter 2026/27, Helvetic Airways will operate the flights with an Embraer 190 aircraft. The changes will also affect employees. The airport will need slightly more staff, while People's Airline will need fewer flight crew members because the new aircraft is smaller. Overall, People's Airline wants to offer more flights to Vienna, reduce emissions and improve reliability and Profitability.

== Destinations ==
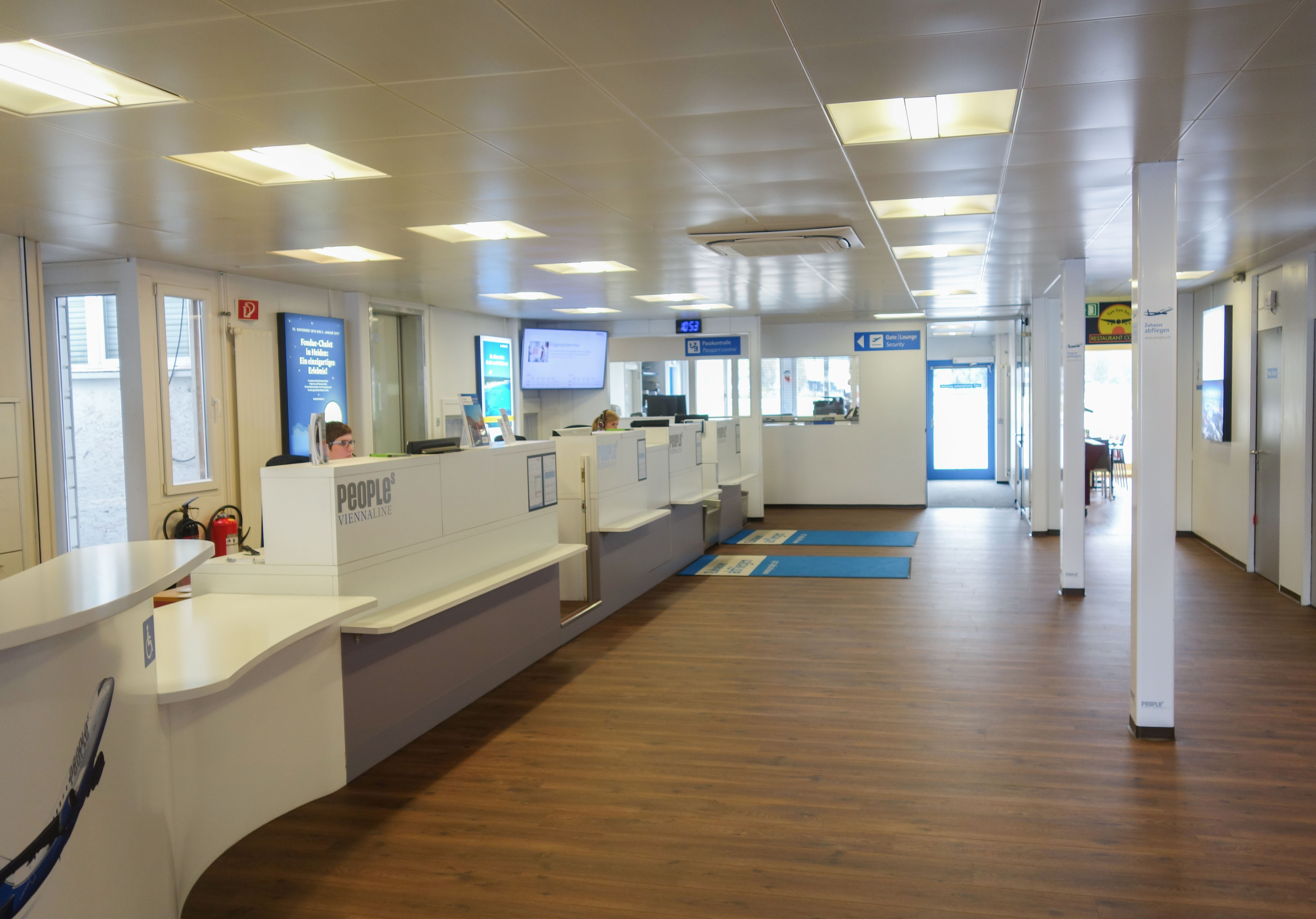
Check-in area at St. Gallen–Altenrhein Airport

As of October 2019, People's operated one year-round scheduled route and some seasonal scheduled and charter services:

Country	City	Airport	Notes	Refs
Austria	Salzburg	Salzburg Airport ^{Seasonal Charter}	Terminated	
Austria	Vienna	Vienna International Airport		
Croatia	Pula	Pula Airport	Seasonal	
France	Corsica	Calvi–Sainte-Catherine Airport ^{Seasonal Charter}	Terminated	
Germany	Friedrichshafen	Friedrichshafen Airport	Terminated	
Germany	Memmingen	Memmingen Airport ^{Seasonal Charter}	Terminated	
Greece	Cephalonia	Cephalonia International Airport	Seasonal	
Greece	Preveza	Aktion National Airport	Seasonal	
Italy	Cagliari	Cagliari Elmas Airport	Seasonal Charter	
Italy	Naples	Naples International Airport	Seasonal	
Italy	Olbia	Olbia Costa Smeralda Airport	Seasonal Charter	
Spain	Ibiza	Ibiza Airport	Seasonal	
Spain	Menorca	Menorca Airport	Seasonal	
Spain	Palma de Mallorca	Palma de Mallorca Airport	Seasonal	
Switzerland	Bern	Bern Airport ^{Seasonal Charter}	Terminated	
Switzerland	St. Gallen	St. Gallen-Altenrhein Airport	Hub	
Switzerland	Zürich	Zürich Airport ^{Sesaonal Charter}	Terminated	

== Fleet ==
As of August 2025, People's operates the following aircraft:

People's fleet
Aircraft	In service	Orders	Passengers	Notes
Embraer 190	1		112	Wetlease Helvetic Airways
Dornier 328	-	1	32	Dry Lease from Private Wings
Total	1	—		

In October 2026, People's announced that they would substitute their Embraer 170 with a smaller Dornier Do-328-100, downsizing the capacity to 32 passengers per flight. At the same time, People's will fly from St. Gallen Altenrhein to Vienna three times a day instead of one.
