= St. Gallen–Altenrhein Airport =

St. Gallen–Altenrhein Airport Flughafen St. Gallen-Altenrhein
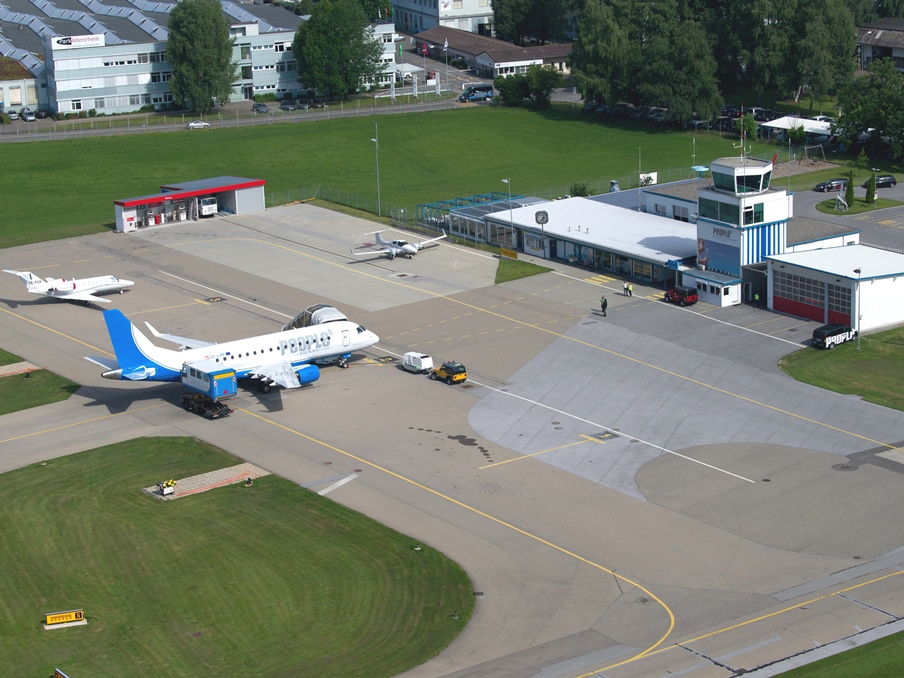
- IATA: ACH; ICAO: LSZR

Summary
- Serves: St. Gallen, Switzerland; Lake Constance; Liechtenstein
- Location: Altenrhein
- Hub for: People's
- Elevation AMSL: 1,306 ft (398 m)
- Coordinates: 47°29′07.9″N 9°33′40.0″E

Map
- Location of airport in Switzerland Location of airport in Canton of St. Gallen

Runways
| Direction | Length | | Surface |
| Direction | ft | m | Surface |
|---|---|---|---|
| 10R/28L | 4,921 | 1,500 | Asphalt |
| 10L/28R | 1,968 | 600 | Grass |

St. Gallen–Altenrhein Airport, German: Flughafen St. Gallen-Altenrhein, (IATA: ACH, ICAO: LSZR) is a small airport in Altenrhein in the Canton of St. Gallen, Switzerland, near Lake Constance. It is the home base for People's.

== History ==
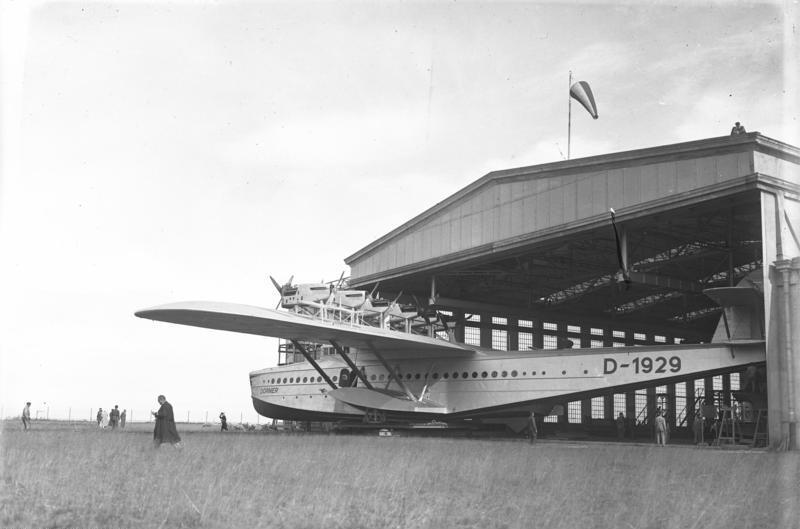
A Dornier Do X at the airport in 1930.

At the end of World War II, Swiss authorities identified existing locations that were to be modernized as regional airports, a second tier of infrastructure to support the primary urban airports, with St. Gallen-Altenrhein being one of the five.

Austrian Airlines served St. Gallen-Altenrhein from Vienna since 2003 when it took over the route from Rheintalflug, a predecessor of InterSky. The airport decided to terminate the contracts with Austrian in 2011 and started their own airline, People's (formerly People's Viennaline), to serve the route. Austrian decided to continue the route as well in direct competition. As a result, there were up to six daily flights from the small airport to Vienna during that period. In spring 2013, Austrian announced the termination of its route to Vienna due to continuing losses as a result of the harsh competition. After that, People's offered a codeshare agreement to Austrian, which it declined.

== Facilities ==
=== Terminal ===
The airport features a small passenger terminal building and some apron and hangar stands for aircraft such as the Embraer 170, business jets or general aviation planes such as the Cessna 172. As there are no jet bridges, walk-boarding is used.

=== Runway ===
The paved, eastbound runway 10 is equipped with an Instrument landing system (ILS CAT I). Due to its short length the main runway can only be used by smaller passenger aircraft such as the Embraer E-Jets or the Bombardier Q Series.

== Airlines and destinations ==
The following airline offers regularly scheduled, seasonal, and seasonal charter flights at St. Gallen–Altenrhein Airport:

| Airlines | Destinations |
|---|---|
| People's | Vienna; Seasonal: Cagliari, Ibiza, Kefalonia, Menorca, Naples, Olbia, Palma de Mallorca, Preveza, Pula; Seasonal charter: Lamezia Terme, Zadar |
| Private Wings | Seasonal charter: Brač, Elba |

The nearest larger airport is Friedrichshafen Airport in Germany, on the opposite side of Lake Constance, 45 kilometres (28 mi) to the north-west by car or by ferry.

== Ground transportation ==
The airport can be reached via motorway A1 (Zürich - Winterthur, Exit Rheineck-Thal). Taxis and a shuttle service are available. There is also a scheduled bus connection from the airport to the nearby towns of Rorschach and Rheineck and their railway stations, Rorschach and Rheineck, respectively.

== Incidents and accidents ==
- On 24 January 1994, a Cessna 425 crashed into Lake Constance at Rorschach during its approach to the airport, killing all 5 people on board.

== See also ==
- Transport in Switzerland
- RUAG
