= Sundor =

Israeli airline

Sundor סאן דור
IATA	ICAO	Call sign
LY	ELY	ELAL
- Founded: 1977; 49 years ago
- Hubs: Ben Gurion Airport
- Frequent-flyer program: Matmid
- Fleet size: 6
- Destinations: 17
- Parent company: El Al
- Headquarters: Tel Aviv, Israel
- Key people: Olga Alauof, President
- Website: elal.com

Sundor (Hebrew: סאן דור, previously styled as Sun d'Or) is an Israeli airline brand and former airline with its base at Tel Aviv's Ben Gurion Airport. It is a wholly owned subsidiary of El Al, which uses the brand mainly for seasonal scheduled and charter services, mostly to European destinations. All of their flights are operated by El Al, as Sundor's own license was suspended in 2011.

== History ==
The former Sundor logo before its rebranding in 2024.

=== 20th century ===
Sundor was established on 1 October 1977 as El Al Charter Services Ltd., as a subsidiary of El Al at a time when the airline was fully owned by the State. The airline changed its name in 1981 to Sun d'Or (d’Or means "of Gold" in French), and soon after, Uriel Yashiv, the CEO of the airline at the time, chose to add "International Airlines" to the airline's name to create Sun d'Or International Airlines. This additional qualification is not used in Hebrew, however, and both aircraft flown by the company bear solely the "Sundor - סאן דור" title.

In 1988, Sundor had its head office in the El Al House in Tel Aviv.

=== 21st century ===
Since April 2001, Sundor had grown to become a significant player in the Israeli charter market. The airline also operated flights for incoming tourists, on behalf of European and Israeli operators. In January 2005, Sundor became a private company following the privatisation of El Al. The airline is licensed for the commercial transport of passengers and cargo on charter flights to and from Israel and owned an Air Operator Certificate to operate two leased planes that were fully serviced by El Al's maintenance.

Sundor remained a fully owned subsidiary company of El Al and as such its passengers could take advantage of this association. Benefits included the ability for passengers to accumulate El Al frequent flyer points on Sundor flights, and the supplying of food including all types of special meals through Tamam-Catering, an El Al Subsidiary. El Al also provided ground services, air crews and aircraft for Sundor. The airline had introduced a new look website and were to apply the same to their fleet as well.

In March 2011, The Israel Civil Aviation Authority (CAA) announced the suspension of Sundor's operating license effective 1 April 2011. The CAA based its decision citing non-compliance with Israeli and international airline management standards, mainly lack of self-owned planes and crew. Since then, Sundor no longer operates own aircraft but utilizes planes from its parent, El Al.

In May 2015, El Al confirmed it was in merger talks with its competitor Israir Airlines. While Sundor would be dissolved, El Al would gain shares in Israir instead.

== Destinations ==
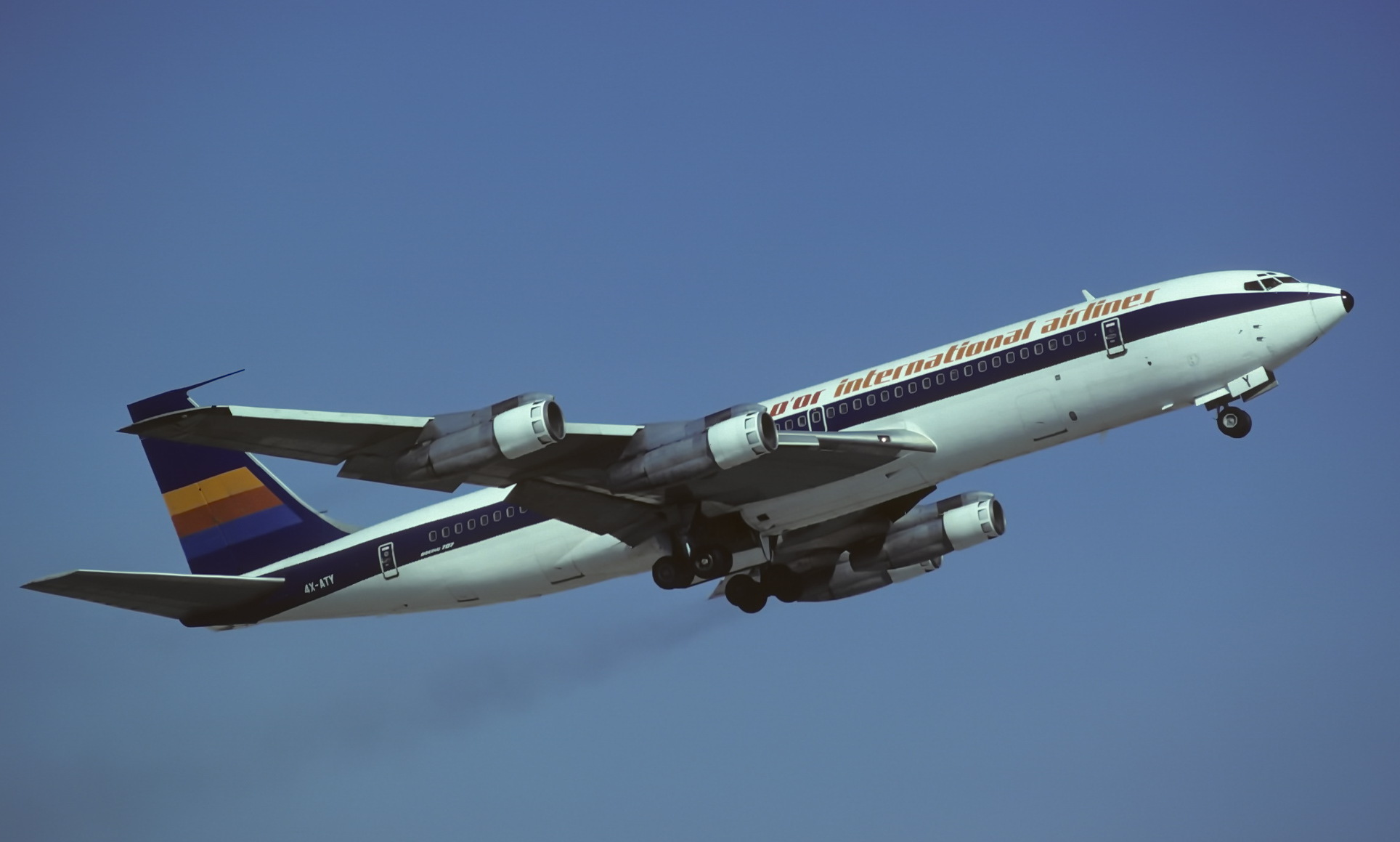
Sundor Boeing 707 in 1984

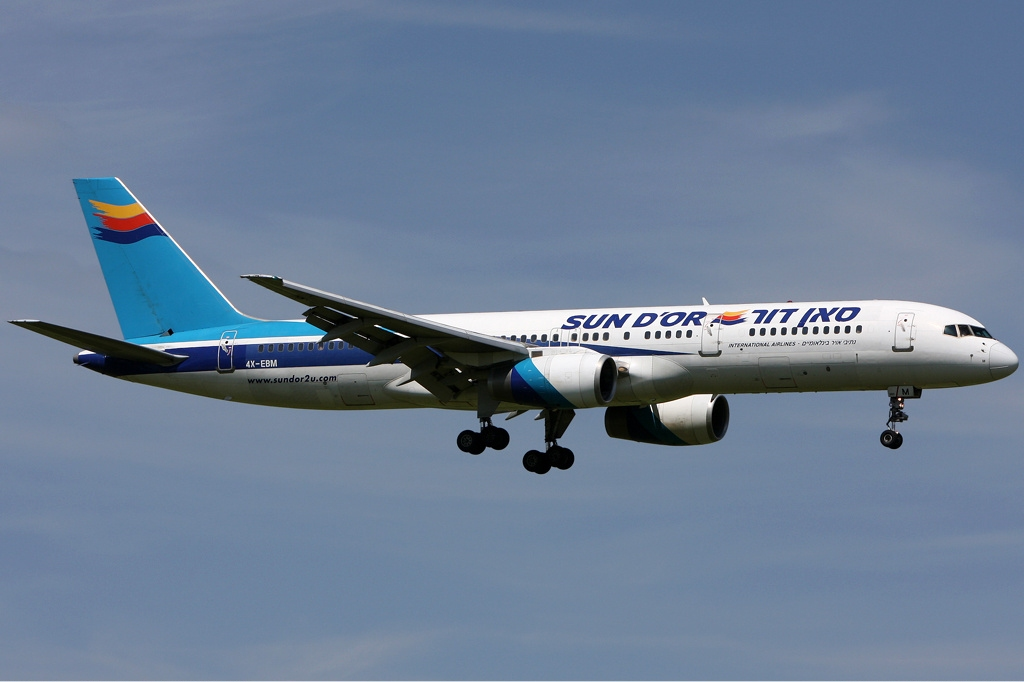
Sundor Boeing 757-200, retired in 2011

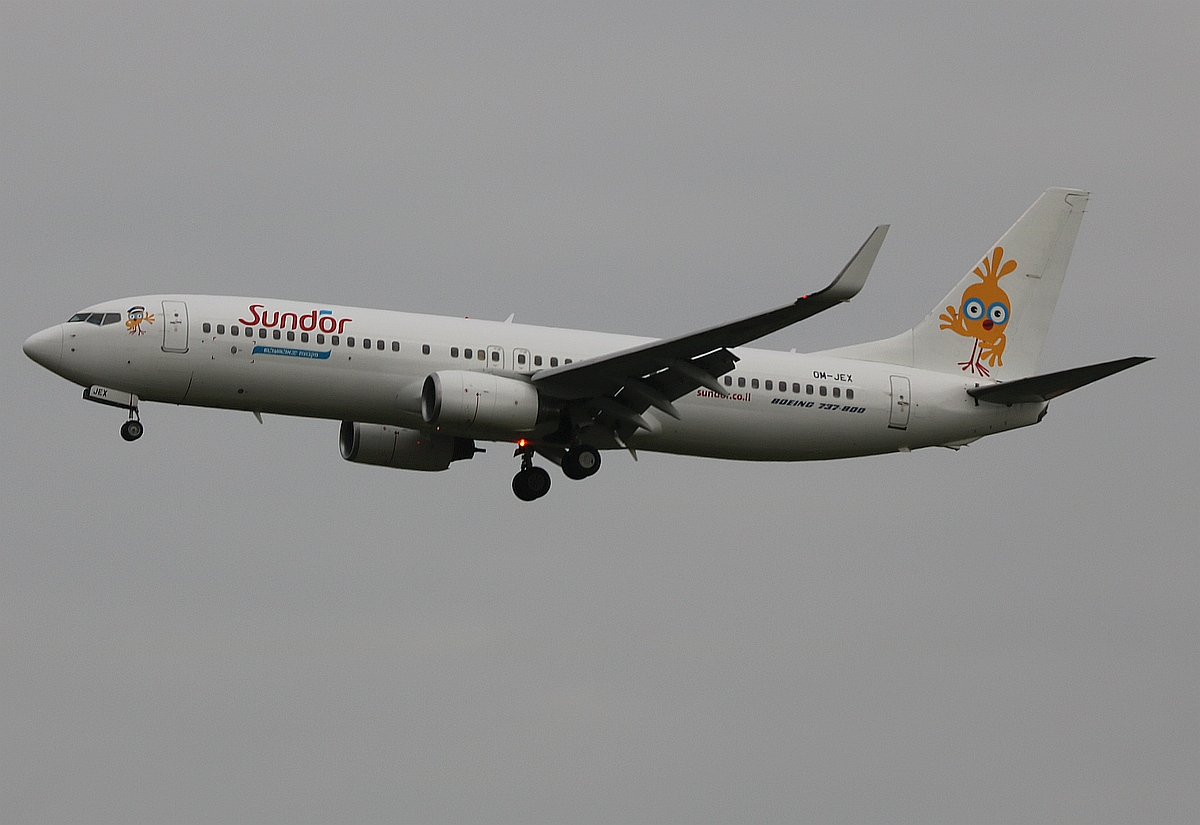
Sundor Boeing 737-800 operated by El Al in 2019

Sundor branded flights are operated by El Al to the following destinations as of January 2024:

Country	City	Airport	Notes	Refs
Albania	Tirana	Tirana International Airport Nënë Tereza	Seasonal	
Austria	Salzburg	Salzburg Airport W. A. Mozart	Seasonal	
Bulgaria	Varna	Varna Airport	Seasonal	
Croatia	Dubrovnik	Dubrovnik Ruđer Bošković Airport	Seasonal	
Croatia	Zagreb	Zagreb Franjo Tuđman Airport	Seasonal	
Cyprus	Larnaca	Larnaca International Airport		
Cyprus	Paphos	Paphos International Airport		
Denmark	Copenhagen	Copenhagen Airport, Kastrup	Seasonal	
Egypt	Sharm El Sheikh	Sharm El Sheikh International Airport	Terminated	
France	Lyon	Lyon–Saint-Exupéry Airport		
France	Nice	Nice Côte d'Azur Airport	Terminated	
Georgia	Batumi	Alexander Kartveli Batumi International Airport	Seasonal	
Georgia	Tbilisi	Shota Rustaveli Tbilisi International Airport		
Greece	Athens	Athens International Airport Eleftherios Venizelos	Terminated	
Greece	Heraklion	Heraklion International Airport "Nikos Kazantzakis"	Seasonal	
Greece	Kefalonia	Kefalonia International Airport	Seasonal	
Greece	Mykonos	Mykonos Airport	Seasonal	
Greece	Preveza / Lefkada	Aktion National Airport	Seasonal	
Greece	Rhodes	Rhodes Airport	Seasonal	
Greece	Sitia	Sitia Public Airport	Terminated	
Greece	Thessaloniki	Thessaloniki Airport "Makedonia"		
Greece	Thira	Santorini International Airport	Seasonal	
Israel	Tel Aviv	David Ben Gurion Airport	Base	
Italy	Cagliari	Cagliari Elmas Airport	Seasonal	
Italy	Catania	Catania–Fontanarossa Airport	Seasonal	
Italy	Naples	Naples-Capodichino International Airport		
Italy	Verona	Verona Villafranca Airport	Begins 25 October 2026	
Moldova	Chișinău	Chișinău Eugen Doga International Airport		
Montenegro	Podgorica	Podgorica Airport	Terminated	
Montenegro	Tivat	Tivat Airport	Seasonal	
Morocco	Marrakesh	Marrakesh Menara Airport	Begins 15 December 2026	
Poland	Kraków	Kraków John Paul II International Airport		
Poland	Warsaw	Warsaw Chopin Airport		
Portugal	Porto	Francisco Sá Carneiro Airport		
Serbia	Belgrade	Belgrade Nikola Tesla Airport		
Slovakia	Piešťany	Piešťany Airport	Terminated	
Slovenia	Ljubljana	Ljubljana Jože Pučnik Airport	Terminated	
Switzerland; France; Germany	Basel; Mulhouse; Freiburg	EuroAirport Basel Mulhouse Freiburg	Seasonal	
Turkey	Istanbul	Istanbul Airport	Terminated	

== Fleet ==
As of May 2026, the fleet operated under the Sundor brand consists of the following aircraft:

Sundor fleet
Aircraft	In service	Orders	Passengers	Notes
Boeing 737-800	7	—	189	Operated by El Al. 3 leased from KlasJet.
Total	7	—		
