= Vienna International Airport =

Airport in Schwechat, Austria

Vienna Airport Flughafen Wien-Schwechat

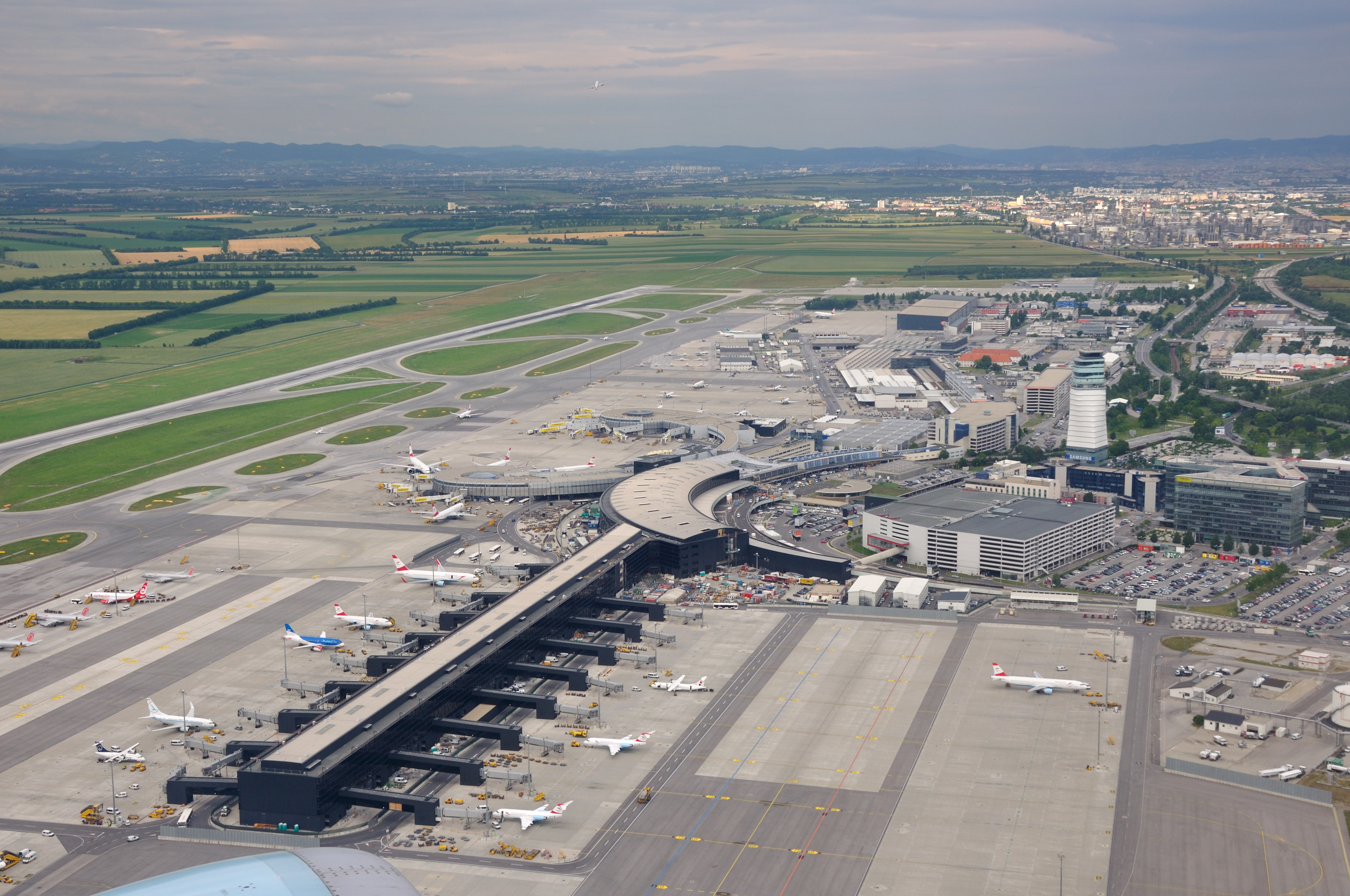
- IATA: VIE; ICAO: LOWW

Summary
- Airport type: Public
- Owner/Operator: Flughafen Wien AG
- Serves: Vienna, Austria; Bratislava, Slovakia
- Location: Schwechat, Lower Austria
- Opened: 1938; 88 years ago
- Hub for: Austrian Airlines
- Focus city for: Korean Air Cargo
- Operating base for: Ryanair
- Elevation AMSL: 183 m (600 ft)
- Coordinates: 48°06′37″N 016°34′11″E
- Website: www.viennaairport.com

Maps
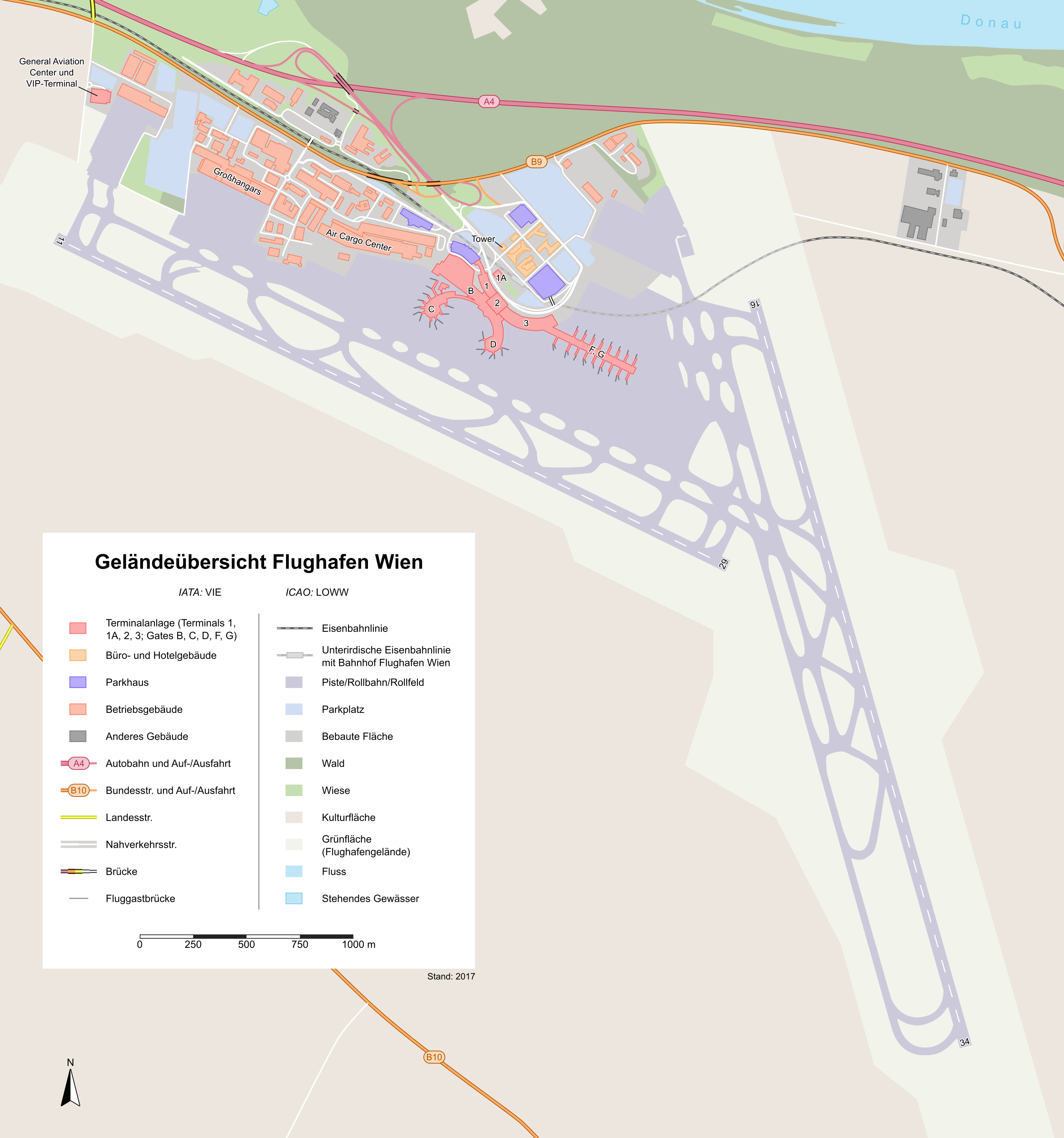
- Airport map

- Location within Austria
- Interactive map of Vienna Airport

Runways
Direction	Length		Surface
Direction	m	ft	Surface
11/29	3,500	11,483	Asphalt
16/34	3,600	11,811	Asphalt

Statistics (2025)
- Passengers: 32,559,135 ▲+2.6%
- Aircraft movements: 240,361 ▲+2.7%
- Cargo (metric tons): 232,840 ▼-3.9%
- Source: Statistics Austria

Vienna Airport (IATA: VIE, ICAO: LOWW) is an international airport serving Vienna, the capital of Austria. It is located in Schwechat, 18 km (11 mi) southeast of central Vienna and 57 kilometres (35 mi) west of Bratislava, the capital of Slovakia. Its official name according to the Austrian Aeronautical Information Publication is Wien-Schwechat Airport. It is the country's largest airport and serves as the hub for Austrian Airlines as well as a base for low-cost carrier Ryanair and since April 2025 also for leisure airline Condor. It is capable of handling wide-body aircraft up to the Airbus A380. The airport features a dense network of European destinations as well as long-haul flights to Asia, North America and Africa.

== History ==
=== Early years ===
On 27 December 1985, the El Al ticket counter was attacked by Abu Nidal, a Palestinian terrorist organisation that simultaneously conducted a terrorist attack at Fiumicino Airport in Rome.

Flughafen Wien AG, one of the few publicly traded airport operators in Europe, was privatised in 1992. The state of Lower Austria and the City of Vienna each hold 20% of the shares, the private employee participation foundation holds 10%, with the remaining 50% held privately. The shares used to be part of the Austrian Traded Index but were removed in September 2017.

=== Development since the 2000s ===
To accommodate future growth, in 1998 Vienna Airport published a master plan that outlined expansion projects until 2015. These projects included a new office park, railway station, cargo centre, general aviation centre, air traffic control tower, terminal, and runway. Additionally, the plan called for streamlined security control. The centrepiece of the enlargement was the new terminal, dubbed Skylink during its construction. In 2002, the airport's management estimated that building the new terminal will cost €401.79 million. However, costs skyrocketed and in 2009 stood at an estimated €929.5 million. The Austrian Court of Audit then recommended that the airport implement several cost-savings measures, which in the Court's estimate brought down final costs to €849.15 million, still more than double the original plans.

On 5 June 2012, the new Austrian Star Alliance Terminal (Terminal 3, named Skylink during its construction) was opened, which enables the airport to handle up to 30 million passengers per year. Construction started in 2004 and was suspended due to projected cost increases in 2009, but resumed in 2010. The maximum planned costs totaled less than €770 million. Following concerns over the mismanagement of the Skylink project, chief executive Herbert Kaufman agreed to resign at the end of December 2010. The new building with its North Pier has 17 jetbridges and makes the airport capable of handling more aircraft, although the new terminal is not able to handle Airbus A380 aircraft. However, the older Concourse D will see an upgrade to accommodate the A380.

== Terminals ==
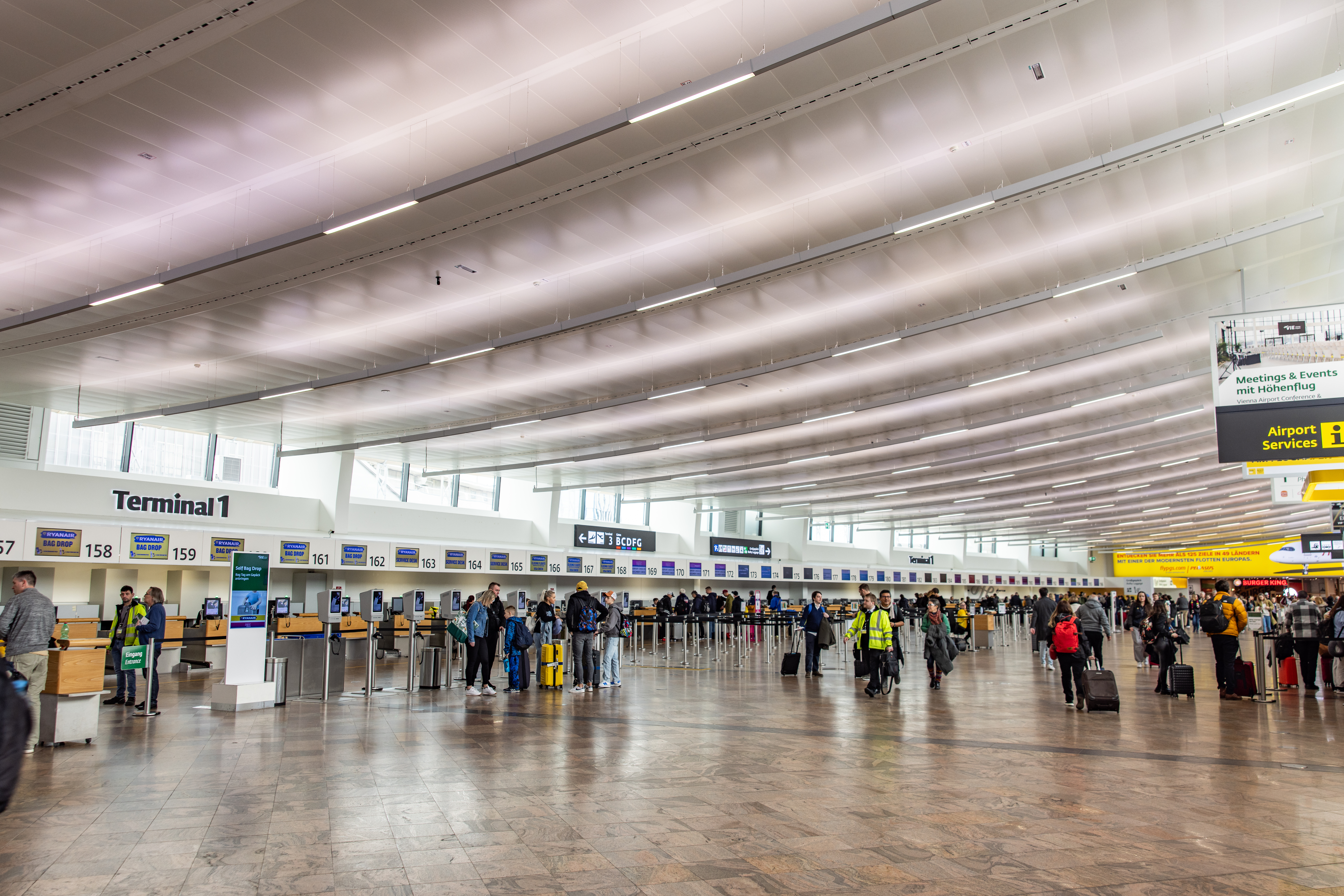
Terminal 1 interior

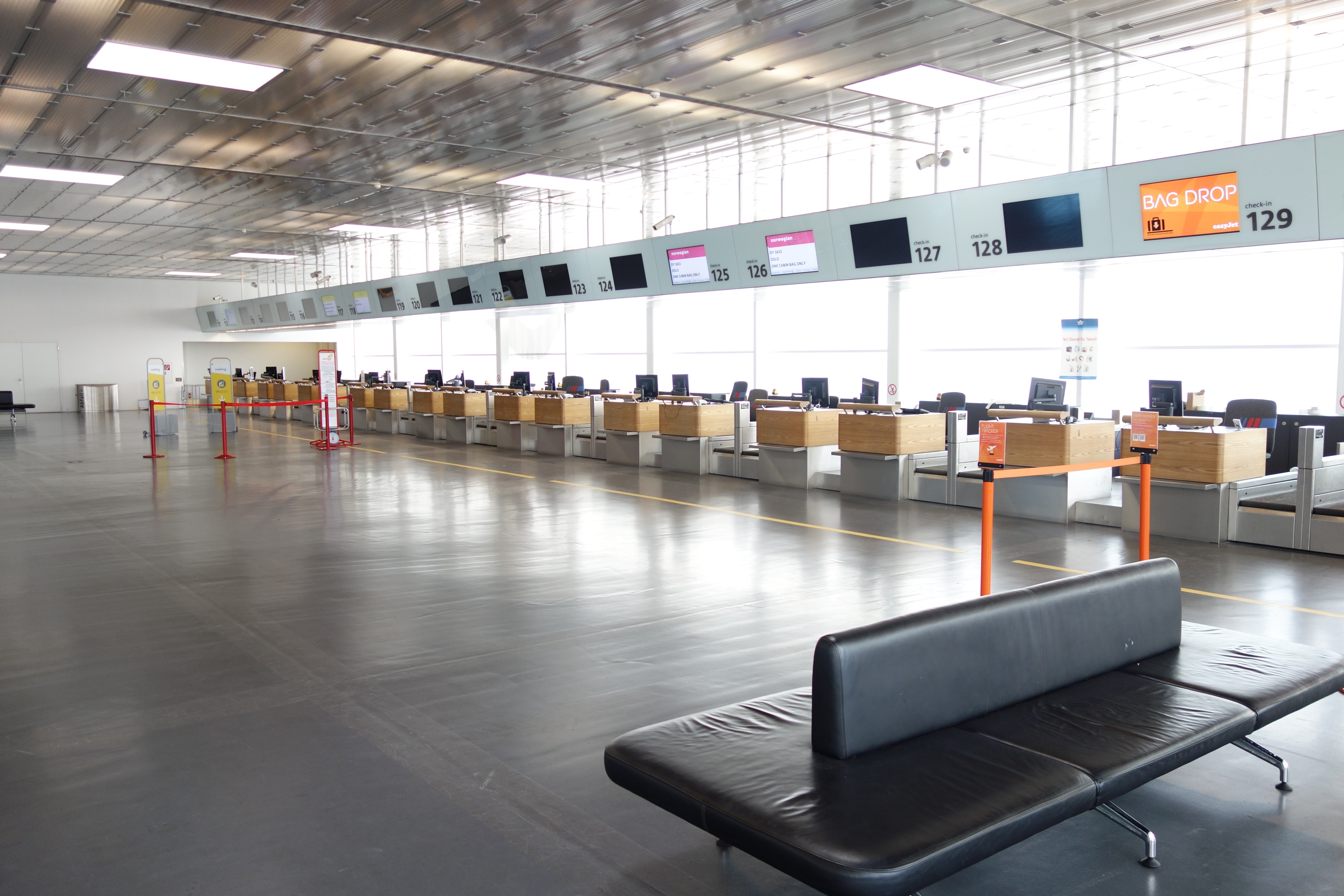
Terminal 1A interior

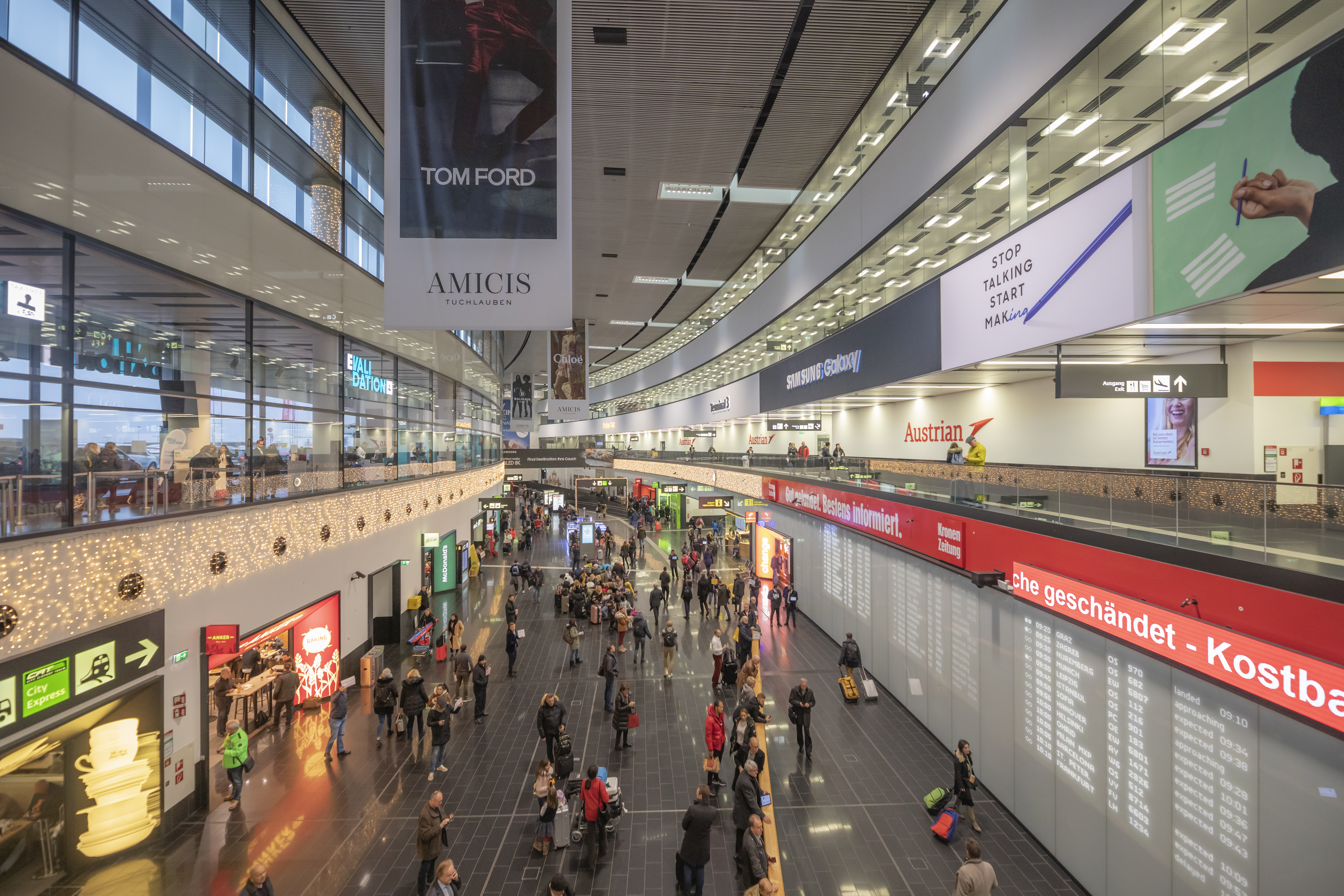
Terminal 3 interior

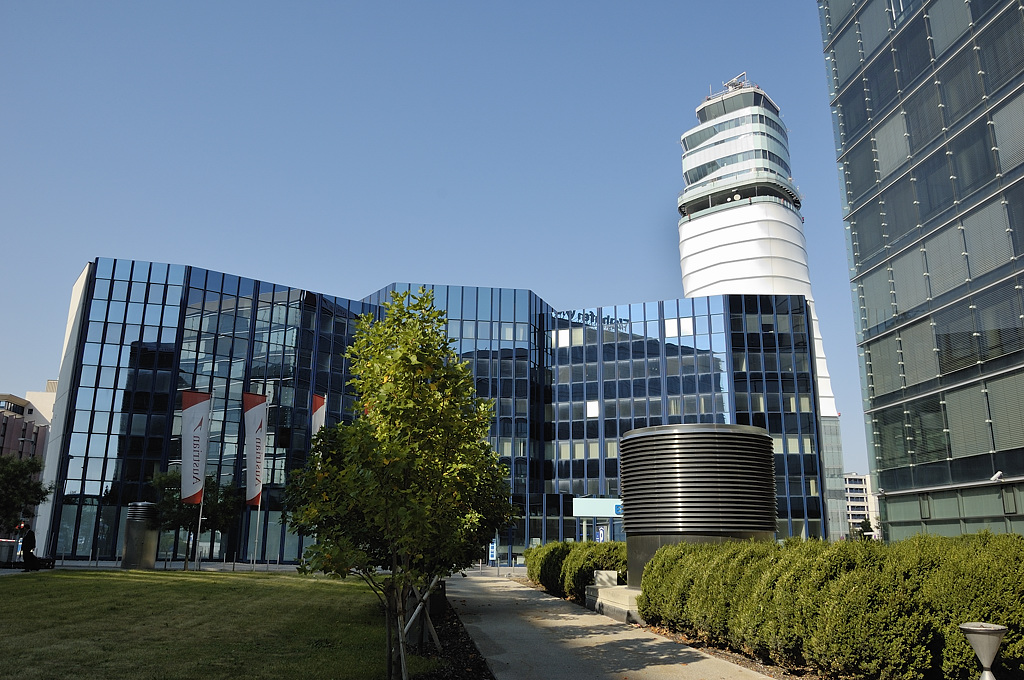
Air traffic control tower behind the head office of Austrian Airlines

The airport has four terminal buildings named Terminal 1, 2 and 3 which are directly built against each other as well as the additional Terminal 1A located opposite Terminal 1. Terminals 1, 2 and 3 connect to the five concourses. The central arrivals hall for all terminal areas is located in Terminal 3.

=== Terminals ===
- Terminal 1A, a standalone building opposite Terminal 1, originally built as a temporary complex in 2005. It hosts check-in facilities for a variety of carriers, including leisure airlines like Air Arabia, Condor or SunExpress, along with legacy and long haul carriers like Hainan Airlines or China Airlines. For renovation purposes the terminal had been temporarily closed in early 2025 and was reopened in modernised appearance April 2025.
- Terminal 2 was finished in 1960, when it was the only terminal of the airport. A huge extension was built in 1993, when the Plaza opened. Because of the opening of the new Terminal 3, the check-in area of Terminal 2 stopped operating in 2012. It was refurbished between 2016 and 2022 and now features new security screening areas and a revamped baggage reclaim, which is connected to the baggage reclaim of Terminal 3. The original Terminal 2 is now used as the entrance of Concourses C and D.
- Terminal 3, also referred to as the Austrian Star Alliance Terminal, with its adjoining Concourses F and G is the airport's newest facility. It was built between 2006 and 2012. It is used by Austrian Airlines, most Star Alliance members, and a number of other carriers including Emirates, El Al, Korean Air and Qatar Airways. A planned expansion has been postponed indefinitely.

=== Concourses ===
- Concourse B was on ground level, adjacent to Concourse C and featured Gates B31–B42 (boarding by buses) for Schengen destinations. From 2021 it was temporarily used to handle non-Schengen bus arrivals. In 2022 it has been refurbished to assume that role permanently.
- Concourse C (pier west) was finished in 1996. It is used for Schengen destinations; features Gates C21-24) (boarding via buses), C31–C42 (jetbridges) C71–C75 (boarding via buses)
- Concourse D (pier east; formerly Concourse A) opened 1988 and is used for non-Schengen destinations with shared passport control at the entrance of Pier East; features Gates D21–D29 (boarding via jetbridges), D31–D37 (boarding via buses), D61–D70 (buses). Concourse D has been closed and partially refurbished during the COVID-19 pandemic.
- Concourse F (Level 1 of pier north) was finished in 2012, when the new Terminal 3 opened. It is used for Schengen destinations and consists of Gates F01-F37 (jetbridges and buses) and Gates F71-F75 (bus gates)
- Concourse G (Level 3 and basement of pier north) for non-Schengen destinations; shared passport control at the entrance of Level 3; features Gates G01-G37 (jetbridges and bus gates) and G61-67 (boarding via buses).

== Expansion projects ==
=== Terminal 3 expansion ===
In addition to the aforementioned refurbishments of existing passenger facilities, a completely new building is under construction as of early 2024, which is supposed to connect the existing pier east and pier north. The so-called T3 Southern Enlargement will be offering 70,000 m^{2} (750,000 sq ft) of leisure area, 10,000 m² of which will be used for shops and restaurants etc. The building will also feature 18 new additional bus gates, including 9 gates for Schengen Destinations and 9 gates for Non-Schengen Destinations. The opening had originally been planned for 2023, however, the project had been delayed in the wake of the COVID-19 pandemic. In January 2023 it was announced that the construction of the new building was then set to start in mid-2023. Construction for the new terminal annex subsequently started in February 2024 with a completion date expected for early 2027.

=== Third runway ===
Map with planned third runway

Vienna Airport originally projected that it would need a third runway by 2012, or 2016 at the latest, in the event of cooperation with nearby Bratislava Airport. The third runway is planned to be parallel to and south of the existing runway 11/29. It will be designated 11R/29L, with the existing runway being renamed 11L/29R. The new runway is planned to be 3,680 m (12,070 ft) long and 60 m (200 ft) wide, and equipped with a category III instrument landing system in one direction (29L).

Prior to the COVID-19 pandemic the airport projected that a third runway will be necessary by 2025, however, environmental organisations and some local communities oppose construction. These groups have attacked the decision of Lower Austria (the state in which the airport is located) to move ahead with the first phase of construction. A verdict from the administrative court that has taken up the lawsuit was expected later in 2015. As of September 2016, there were ongoing public protests while no legal decision had been made. On 28 March 2018, the Austrian Federal Administrative Court ruled in favour of a third runway. Despite the approval to build the third runway the airport in late 2025 decided to not continue the project.

== Airlines and destinations ==
=== Passenger ===
The following airlines offer regular scheduled and charter flights at Vienna Airport:

Airlines	Destinations
Aegean Airlines	Athens
Aer Lingus	Dublin
Air Algerie	Algiers
Air Arabia	Sharjah
Air Cairo	Hurghada; Seasonal: Marsa Alam
Air Canada	Toronto–Pearson
Air China	Beijing–Capital
Air France	Paris–Charles de Gaulle
Air India	Delhi
Air Mediterranean	Athens
Air Serbia	Belgrade, Niš
AirBaltic	Riga, Tallinn
AJet	Ankara, Istanbul–Sabiha Gökçen; Seasonal: Bodrum, Dalaman
All Nippon Airways	Tokyo–Haneda
American Airlines	Seasonal: Philadelphia (begins 7 May 2027)
Animawings	Cluj
Arkia	Tel Aviv
Austrian Airlines	Amman–Queen Alia, Amsterdam, Athens, Bangkok–Suvarnabhumi, Barcelona, Belgrade, Berlin, Bologna, Boston, Bremen, Brussels, Bucharest–Otopeni, Budapest, Cairo, Chicago–O'Hare, Chișinău, Cologne/Bonn, Copenhagen, Düsseldorf, Erbil, Frankfurt, Geneva, Gran Canaria, Hamburg, Hanover, Iași, Innsbruck, Klagenfurt, Košice, Kraków, Larnaca, Leipzig/Halle, London–Heathrow, Lyon, Málaga, Milan–Linate, Montréal–Trudeau, Munich, Naples, New York–JFK, Newark, Nice, Oslo, Palma de Mallorca, Paris–Charles de Gaulle, Podgorica, Prague, Pristina, Rome–Fiumicino, Sarajevo, Shanghai–Pudong, Sibiu, Skopje, Sofia, Stockholm–Arlanda, Stuttgart, Tbilisi, Tehran–Imam Khomeini, Tel Aviv, Tenerife–South, Thessaloniki, Tirana, Varna, Venice, Vilnius, Warsaw–Chopin, Washington–Dulles, Zagreb (ends 10 January 2027), Zurich; Seasonal: Alicante, Antalya, Bari, Bastia, Bergen, Bilbao, Burgas, Cagliari,, Catania, Chania, Corfu,, Dubai–International, Dubrovnik, Edinburgh, Florence, Funchal, Gothenburg, Harstad/Narvik, Heraklion, Ibiza, Ivalo, Kalamata, Karpathos, Kavala, Kefalonia, Kittilä, Kos, Lamezia Terme, Lemnos, Los Angeles, Malé, Marrakesh, Marseille, Mauritius, Menorca, Mykonos, Mytilene, Ohrid, Olbia, Palermo, Patras, Ponta Delgada, Porto, Preveza/Lefkada, Reykjavík–Keflávik, Rhodes, Rovaniemi, Samos, Santorini, Seville, Skiathos, Split, Sylt, Tivat, Tokyo–Narita, Tromsø, Valencia, Volos, Zadar, Zakynthos; Seasonal charter: Calvi, Hurghada, Marsa Alam, Monastir, Skyros
Azerbaijan Airlines	Baku
Bluebird Airways	Tel Aviv
British Airways	London–Heathrow
Brussels Airlines	Brussels
China Airlines	Taipei–Taoyuan
China Eastern Airlines	Xi'an
Condor	Frankfurt
Corendon Airlines	Seasonal: Antalya, Hurghada, Izmir
Croatia Airlines	Zagreb; Seasonal: Split
easyJet	Milan–Linate; Seasonal: Basel/Mulhouse, Bordeaux, Bristol, Liverpool, London–Gatwick
EgyptAir	Cairo
El Al	Tel Aviv
Electra Airways	Varna
Emirates	Dubai–International
Ethiopian Airlines	Addis Ababa, Copenhagen
Etihad Airways	Abu Dhabi
Eurowings	Cologne/Bonn, Düsseldorf, Hamburg, Stuttgart
EVA Air	Bangkok–Suvarnabhumi, Taipei–Taoyuan
Finnair	Helsinki
FlyLili	Seasonal charter: Tel Aviv
Flynas	Seasonal: Riyadh
Georgian Airways	Tbilisi
Hainan Airlines	Chengdu–Tianfu, Shenzhen
Iberia	Madrid
Jet2.com	Seasonal: Belfast–International, Birmingham, Bournemouth, Bristol, East Midlands, Edinburgh, Glasgow, Leeds/Bradford, Liverpool, London–Gatwick (begins 19 November 2026), London–Stansted, Manchester, Newcastle upon Tyne
KLM	Amsterdam
KM Malta Airlines	Malta
Korean Air	Seoul–Incheon
Kuwait Airways	Seasonal: Kuwait City
LOT Polish Airlines	Warsaw–Chopin
Lufthansa	Frankfurt, Munich
Luxair	Luxembourg
Nile Air	Seasonal charter: Hurghada
Norwegian Air Shuttle	Oslo
Nouvelair	Seasonal: Djerba, Monastir
Pegasus Airlines	Ankara, Istanbul–Sabiha Gökçen; Seasonal: Antalya, Izmir
People's	St. Gallen/Altenrhein
Qatar Airways	Doha
Royal Jordanian	Amman–Queen Alia
Ryanair	Agadir, Alicante, Athens, Banja Luka, Barcelona, Bari, Beauvais, Bergamo, Bologna, Bucharest–Otopeni, Catania, Charleroi, Cologne/Bonn, Dublin, Edinburgh, Eindhoven, Faro, Fuerteventura, Gran Canaria, Helsinki, Kraków, Larnaca, Lisbon, London–Stansted, Madrid, Málaga, Malta, Manchester, Milan–Malpensa, Naples, Palma de Mallorca, Paphos, Porto, Rome–Fiumicino, Stockholm–Arlanda, Tenerife–South, Thessaloniki, Tirana, Treviso, Valencia, Vilnius; Seasonal: Amman–Queen Alia, Burgas, Cagliari, Chania, Corfu, Gothenburg, Heraklion, Ibiza, Kalamata, Kefalonia, Kos, Lamezia Terme, Mykonos, Olbia, Palermo, Preveza/Lefkada, Pula, Rhodes, Rimini, Santorini, Venice, Zadar, Zakynthos
SalamAir	Muscat
Saudia	Jeddah; Seasonal: Riyadh
Scandinavian Airlines	Copenhagen
Scoot	Singapore
Sky Express	Athens
SkyUp Airlines	Chișinău (begins 25 March 2027)
SunExpress	Antalya, Izmir; Seasonal: Ankara, Dalaman, Diyarbakır, Kayseri, Samsun
Syrian Air	Damascus
Swiss International Air Lines	Seasonal: Geneva
TAP Air Portugal	Lisbon
Transavia	Paris–Orly
Tunisair	Tunis
Turkish Airlines	Istanbul
TUS Airways	Tel Aviv
Volotea	Nantes
Vueling	Barcelona

=== Cargo ===
Airlines	Destinations
AirZeta	Milan–Malpensa, Seoul–Incheon
DHL Aviation	Leipzig/Halle
Korean Air Cargo	Delhi, Frankfurt, Hanoi, Madrid, Milan–Malpensa, Oslo, Seoul–Incheon, Zurich
Qatar Airways Cargo	Doha
Silk Way Airlines	Baku, Hahn, Istanbul, Milan–Malpensa

== Statistics ==
=== Traffic figures ===
Traffic by calendar year. Official ACI statistics.
	Passengers	Change from previous year	Aircraft operations	Change from previous year	Cargo (including road feeder service, metric tonnes)	Change from previous year
2005	15,859,050	▲7.26%	252,988	▲3.42%	180,066	▲13.77%
2006	16,855,725	▲6.28%	260,846	▲3.11%	201,870	▲12.11%
2007	18,768,468	▲11.35%	280,912	▲7.69%	205,024	▲1.56%
2008	19,747,289	▲5.22%	292,740	▲4.21%	201,364	▼1.79%
2009	18,114,103	▼8.27%	261,758	▼10.58%	198,407	▼1.47%
2010	19,691,206	▲8.71%	265,150	▲1.30%	231,824	▲16.84%
2011	21,106,292	▲7.19%	266,865	▲0.65%	291,313	▲25.66%
2012	22,195,794	▲5.02%	264,542	▼0.87%	265,467	▼8.89%
2013	21,999,926	▼0.75%	250,224	▼5.41%	268,155	▲1.03%
2014	22,483,158	▲2.20%	249,989	▼0.09%	290,116	▲8.19%
2015	22,775,054	▲1.30%	226,811	▼1.70%	272,575	▼1.80%
2016	23,352,016	▲2.50%	226,395	▼0.20%	282,726	▲3.70%
2017	24,392,805	▲4.50%	224,568	▼0.80%	287,692	▲1.90%
2018	27,037,292	▲10.80%	241,004	▲7.30%	295,427	▲2.60%
2019	31,662,189	▲17.10%	266,802	▲10.70%	283,806	▼3.90%
2020	7,812,938	▼75.32%	95,880	▼64.06%	217,888	▼23.23%
2021	10,405,815	▲33.19%	111,567	▲16.36%	208,010	▼4.53%
2022	23,682,133	▲127.59%	188,412	▲68.88%	208,713	▲0.34%
2023	29,533,186	▲24.70%	221,095	▲17.3%	245,009	▲17.39%
2024	31,719,836	▲7.4%	234,138	▲5.9%	297,945	▲21.6%
Sources: (Years 2005, 2006, 2007, 2009, 2011, 2012, 2013, and 2014, 2015, 2016, 2017, 2018, 2019, 2020, 2021, 2022 2023 and 2024

=== Busiest routes ===
Busiest routes at Vienna Airport (2019)
Rank	Destination	Passengers
1	Frankfurt	1,109,585
2	Berlin–Tegel	966,659
3	Paris–Charles de Gaulle	944,404
4	Amsterdam	943,705
5	Zürich	940,410
6	London–Heathrow	833,930
7	Düsseldorf	771,175
8	Hamburg	720,332
9	Barcelona	640,052
10	Bucharest	634,044

Busiest intercontinental routes at Vienna Airport (2019)
Rank	Airport	Passengers	Operating airlines
1	Tel Aviv	596,989	Austrian Airlines, El Al, Wizz Air, Lauda, Malta Air
2	Dubai–International	415,169	Emirates
3	Bangkok–Suvarnabhumi	340,639	Austrian Airlines, EVA Air, Thai Airways International
4	Taipei–Taoyuan	301,982	China Airlines, EVA Air
5	Istanbul–Sabiha Gökçen	299,778	Pegasus Airlines, AnadoluJet
6	Antalya	273,000	Austrian Airlines, SunExpress, Lauda, Corendon Airlines
7	Doha	228,502	Qatar Airways
8	Chicago–O'Hare	163,006	Austrian Airlines
9	Toronto–Pearson	152,583	Air Canada
10	Cairo	147,210	Austrian Airlines, Egyptair

== Ground transportation ==
=== Train ===
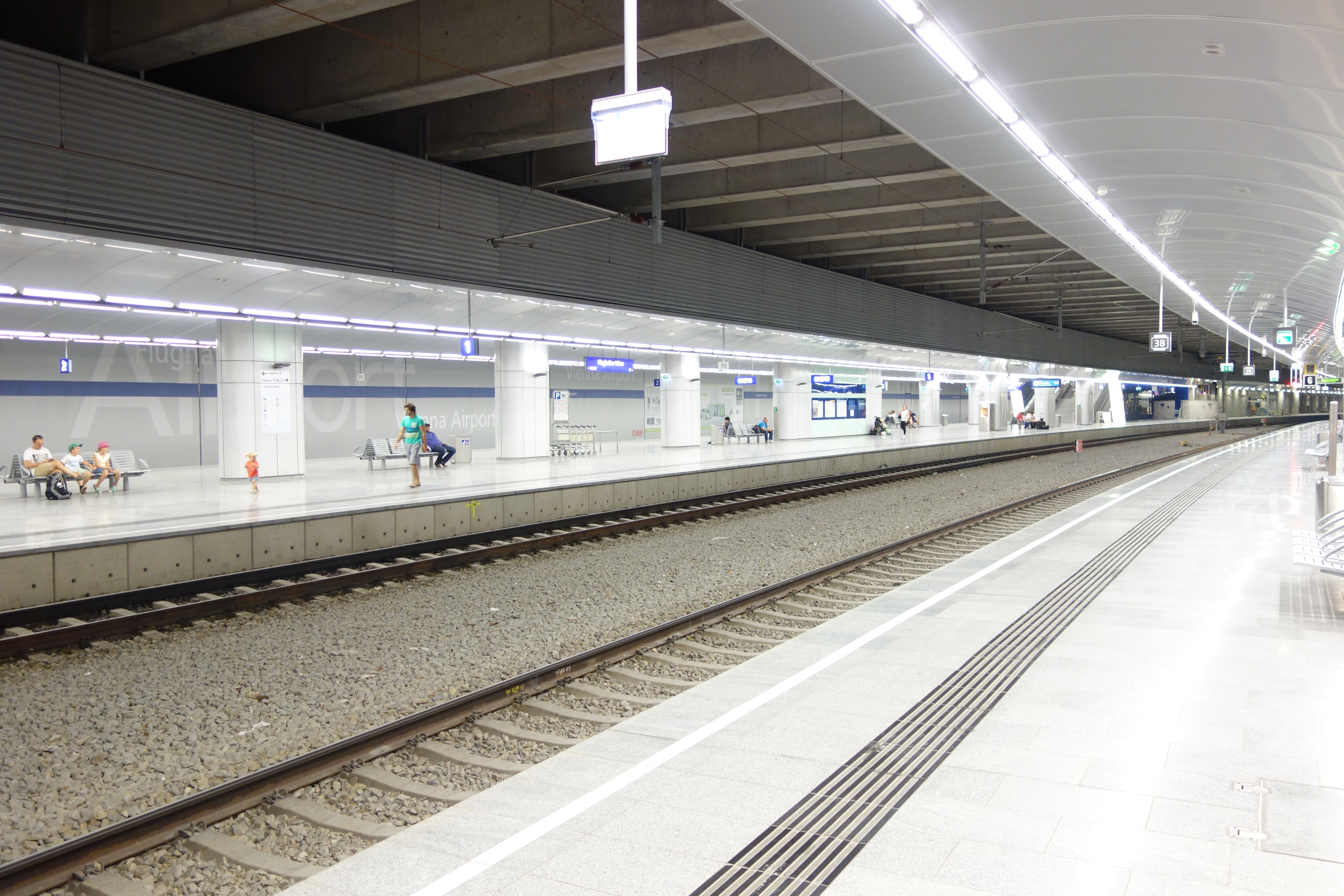
Vienna Airport railway station

The Vienna S-Bahn line S7 provides a local service to the city centre taking approx. 25 minutes. The more expensive City Airport Train connects the airport directly to Wien Mitte railway station, close to the city centre, in 16 minutes.

Additionally, the underground railway station has been expanded to accommodate long-distance trains. Since December 2014, the first trains passing Vienna's new main station, ICE services from Germany, terminate at the airport. Since December 2015, ÖBB Railjet services operate to the airport as well. Long-distance train rides between the airport and the main station take approx. 15 minutes.

=== Car ===
The airport lies directly adjacent to motorway A4 which leads from central Vienna to Budapest. It has its own exit named Flughafen Wien-Schwechat. Bratislava can be reached via motorway A6 which splits from the A4 in the east. Taxis and car rental facilities are available at the airport. There are also several taxi companies that operate at the airport.

=== Bus ===
Buses operate from the airport to various places in Vienna and to other cities including Bratislava, Budapest and Brno.

== Accidents and incidents ==
- In 1955, a Convair CV-340 crashed on approach to the airport, killing 7 of the 29 passengers and crew on board. This is the last fatal aviation accident to occur at Wien-Schwechat Airport.
- On 27 December 1985, 1985 Rome and Vienna airport attacks
- On 12 July 2000, Hapag-Lloyd Flight 3378 crashed short of the runway at the airport on the final approach of its diverted flight due to fuel exhaustion. There were no fatalities, but the aircraft was damaged beyond repair.

== See also ==
- Transport in Austria
- List of airports in Austria
- Wien-Aspern Airport
