= Kefalonia International Airport =

Airport in Greece

Kefalonia Airport "Anna Pollatou" Αερολιμένας Κεφαλονιάς "Άννα Πολλάτου"

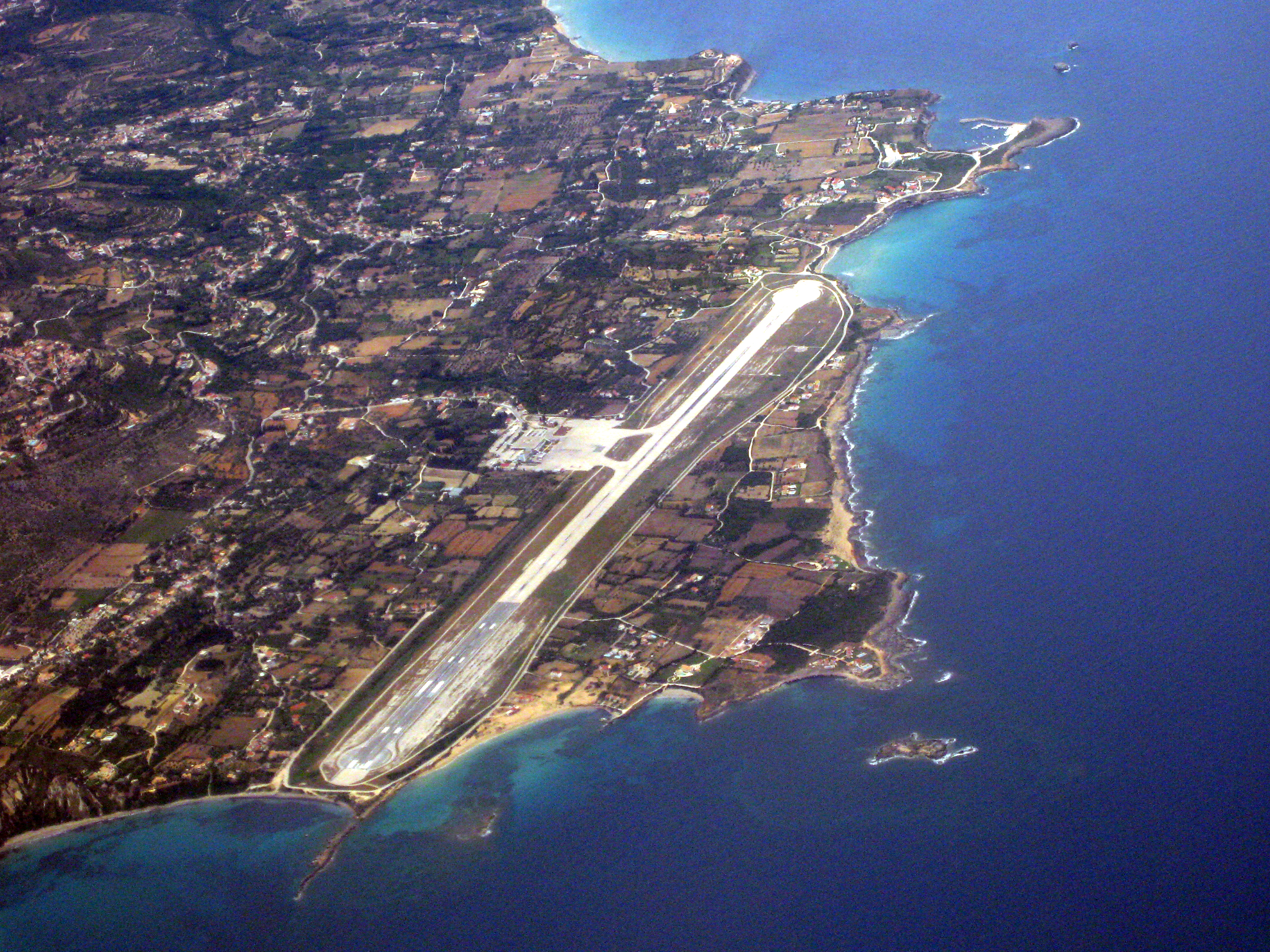
- IATA: EFL; ICAO: LGKF

Summary
- Airport type: Public
- Owner: Greek state
- Operator: Fraport AG/Copelouzos Group joint venture
- Serves: Cephalonia, Greece
- Location: Argostoli
- Elevation AMSL: 59 ft (18 m)
- Coordinates: 38°07′12″N 020°30′01″E
- Website: efl-airport.gr

Map
- Location of airport in Greece

Runways
| Direction | Length | | Surface |
| Direction | m | ft | Surface |
|---|---|---|---|
| 14/32 | 2,436 | 7,992 | Asphalt |

Statistics (2024)
- Passengers: 872,536
- Passenger traffic change: ▲1.4%
- Aircraft movements: 7,998
- Aircraft movements change: ▼1.4%
- Sources:Fraport Greece, DAFIF

Kefalonia Airport "Anna Pollatou" (IATA: EFL, ICAO: LGKF) is an airport on the island of Cephalonia, in Greece. It is located in the southwest of the island, 8 km away from the capital Argostoli.

== History ==
The airport opened in 1971 to serve the former municipality Leivatho with improved transportation links; Kefalonia is now a single municipality. A new runway and the current terminal building were constructed in the 1980s.

In December 2015, the privatization of Kefalonia Airport and 13 other regional airports of Greece was finalized with the signing of the agreement between the Fraport AG/Copelouzos Group joint venture and the state privatisation fund. "We signed the deal today," the head of Greece's privatisation agency Hellenic Republic Asset Development Fund (HRADF), Stergios Pitsiorlas, told Reuters. According to the agreement, the joint venture will operate the 14 airports (including Kefallinia International Airport) for 40 years as of April 2017.

The new operator completed a major upgrade of the airport's facilities, including constructing a new terminal building that replaced the outdated existing one. Upgrades included new check-in desks and security lanes, larger airside space with more shops, new carousels for arrivals and extra car-hire companies. Work has also been completed on the car park and pick-up/drop-off points outside the terminal building. Due to the COVID-19 pandemic, many flights to the airport were suspended for 2020, although flights from Europe are gradually restarting.

== Airlines and destinations ==
The following airlines operate regular scheduled and charter flights at Kefalonia Airport:

| Airlines | Destinations |
|---|---|
| Aegean Airlines | Athens |
| Air Serbia | Seasonal charter: Belgrade |
| Animawings | Seasonal: Bucharest–Otopeni, Timișoara |
| Austrian Airlines | Seasonal: Vienna |
| British Airways | Seasonal: London–Heathrow |
| Condor | Seasonal: Munich |
| Discover Airlines | Seasonal: Frankfurt, Munich |
| easyJet | Seasonal: London–Gatwick, Manchester, Milan–Malpensa, Nice |
| Edelweiss Air | Seasonal: Zurich |
| ITA Airways | Seasonal: Milan-Linate, Rome–Fiumicino |
| Jet2.com | Seasonal: Birmingham, Bristol, East Midlands, Edinburgh, Glasgow, Leeds/Bradford, London–Gatwick, London–Luton (begins 26 May 2027), London–Stansted, Manchester, Newcastle upon Tyne |
| Norwegian Air Shuttle | Seasonal: Oslo |
| People's | Seasonal: St. Gallen/Altenrhein |
| Ryanair | Seasonal: London–Stansted, Milan-Bergamo, Pisa, Rome–Fiumicino, Vienna |
| SkyAlps | Seasonal: Bolzano; Seasonal charter: Innsbruck |
| Sky Express | Athens, Corfu, Preveza/Lefkada, Zakynthos |
| Smartwings | Seasonal: Prague; Seasonal charter: Budapest |
| Sundor | Seasonal: Tel Aviv |
| Transavia | Seasonal: Amsterdam, Paris–Orly |
| TUI Airways | Seasonal: Birmingham, Bournemouth, Bristol, Cardiff, East Midlands, London–Gatwick, London–Stansted, Manchester, Newcastle upon Tyne |
| TUI fly Netherlands | Seasonal: Amsterdam |
| Volotea | Seasonal: Bari, Naples |
| Wizz Air | Seasonal: Bucharest–Otopeni, Budapest, Rome–Fiumicino |

== Statistics ==
The data is taken from the official website of the airport.

| Year | Passengers | | |
| Year | Domestic | International | Total |
|---|---|---|---|
| 2009 | 69,130 | 287,759 | 356,889 |
| 2010 | ▼56,144 | ▲299,824 | ▼355,968 |
| 2011 | ▲48,309 | ▼298,088 | ▼346,397 |
| 2012 | ▲40,984 | ▲337,543 | ▲378,527 |
| 2013 | ▼33,699 | ▲396,663 | ▲430,362 |
| 2014 | ▲58,443 | ▲420,989 | ▲479,432 |
| 2015 | ▼55,915 | ▲436,587 | ▲492,502 |
| 2016 | ▲69,956 | ▲468,243 | ▲538,199 |
| 2017 | ▲82,058 | ▲547,613 | ▲629,671 |
| 2018 | ▲97,622 | ▲664,025 | ▲761,647 |
| 2019 | ▲100,958 | ▲673,212 | ▲774,170 |
| 2020 | ▼33,762 | ▼158,715 | ▼192,477 |
| 2021 | ▲62,874 | ▲240,464 | ▲303,338 |
| 2022 | ▲95,971 | ▲721,245 | ▲817,216 |
| 2023 | ▲114,155 | ▲746,378 | ▲860,533 |
| 2024 | ▲116,607 | ▲755,929 | ▲872,536 |
| 2025 | ▲124,382 | ▲769,315 | ▲893,697 |

=== Traffic statistics by country (2024) ===
Traffic by country at Kefalonia International Airport – 2024
| Place | Country | Total passengers |
|---|---|---|
| 1 | United Kingdom | 481,860 |
| 2 | Greece | 116,607 |
| 3 | Italy | 94,848 |
| 4 | Netherlands | 41,335 |
| 5 | Austria | 27,968 |
| 6 | Czech Republic | 20,789 |
| 7 | Poland | 18,990 |
| 8 | Germany | 14,688 |
| 9 | Israel | 13,476 |
| 10 | France | 9,361 |
| 11 | Serbia | 5,823 |
| 12 | Slovakia | 5,480 |
| 13 | Hungary | 5,053 |
| 14 | Romania | 4,718 |
| 15 | Slovenia | 3,520 |

== Ground transport ==
KTEL runs a limited bus service between the airport and Argostoli.

== See also ==
- Transport in Greece
