= Aktion National Airport =

Airport in Aktion, Greece

Aktion National Airport Αεροδρόμιο Ακτίου

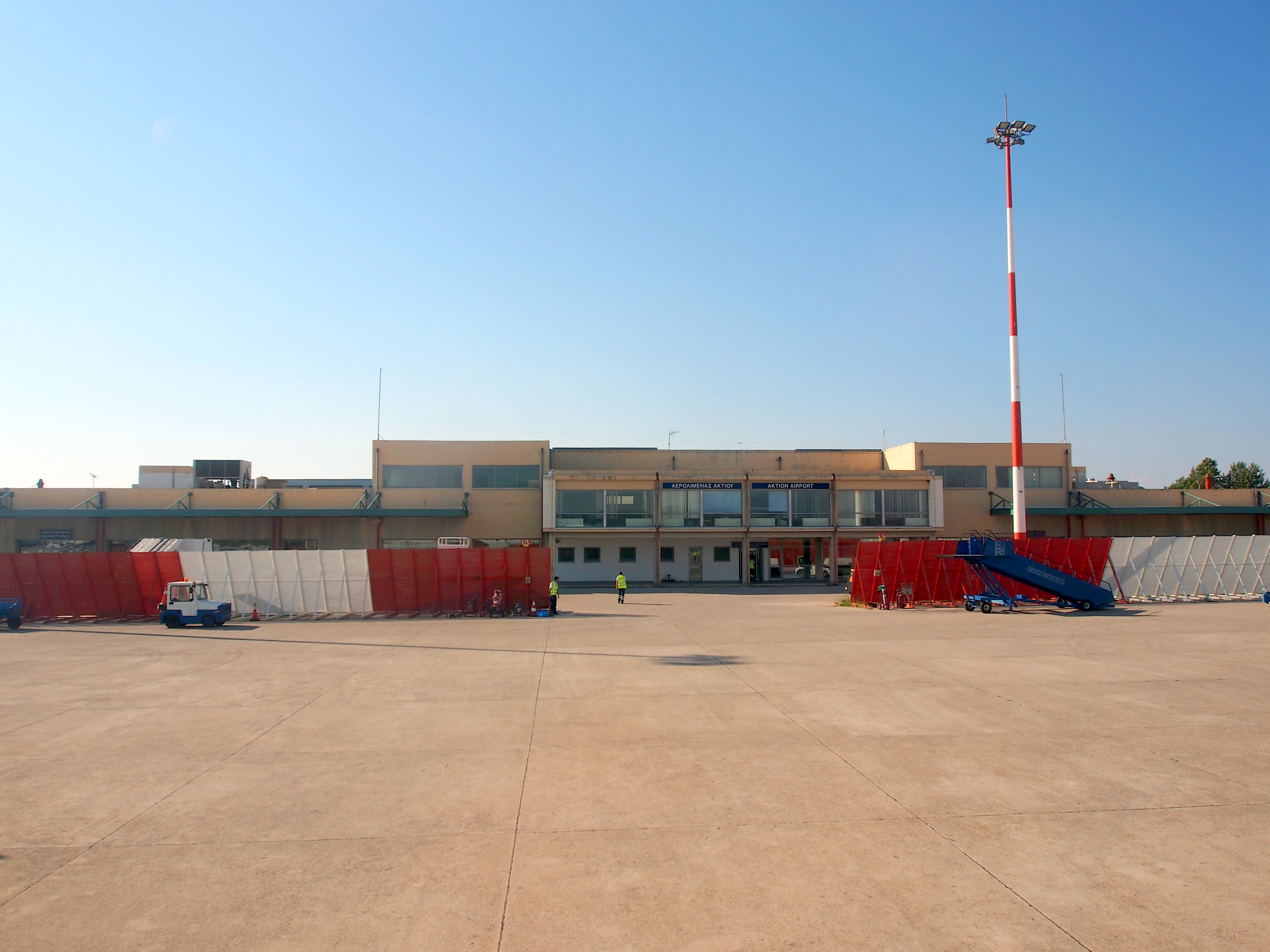
- IATA: PVK; ICAO: LGPZ

Summary
- Airport type: Public and military
- Owner/Operator: Fraport AG/Copelouzos Group joint venture
- Serves: Preveza / Lefkada, Greece
- Location: Aktion
- Elevation AMSL: 11 ft (3.4 m)
- Coordinates: 38°55′32″N 20°45′55″E
- Website: pvk-airport.gr

Map
- Location of airport in Greece

Runways
Direction	Length		Surface
Direction	m	ft	Surface
06/24	2,871	9,419	Asphalt

Statistics (2022)
- Passengers: 773,587
- Passenger traffic change: ▲107.9%
- Aircraft movements: 6,610
- Aircraft movements change: ▲46.2%
- Sources:HCAA, DAFIF, Aktion Airport

Aktion National Airport (IATA: PVK, ICAO: LGPZ) is an airport on the Aktion Peninsula in Acarnania, Greece, serving Preveza and Lefkada. It is also known as Preveza Airport. It is also used by NATO and Hellenic Air Force Command. The airport commenced operations in 1968.

== History ==
In December 2015, the privatisation of Aktion National Airport and 13 other regional airports of Greece was finalised with the signing of the agreement between the Fraport AG/Copelouzos Group joint venture and the state privatisation fund. "We signed the deal today", the head of Greece's privatisation agency HRADF, Stergios Pitsiorlas, told Reuters. According to the agreement, the joint venture will operate the 14 airports (including Aktion National Airport) for 40 years as of autumn 2016.

== Airlines and destinations ==
The following airlines operate regular scheduled and charter flights at Aktion National Airport:

Airlines	Destinations
arkia	Seasonal: Tel Aviv
Austrian Airlines	Seasonal: Vienna
British Airways	Seasonal: London–Heathrow
Condor	Seasonal: Frankfurt, Stuttgart
Corendon Dutch Airlines	Seasonal: Amsterdam
Cyprus Airways	Seasonal: Larnaca
easyJet	Seasonal: Berlin, Bristol, London–Gatwick, Manchester, Milan–Malpensa, Naples
Edelweiss Air	Seasonal: Zurich
Eurowings	Seasonal: Düsseldorf, Stockholm–Arlanda, Stuttgart
Jet2.com	Seasonal: Birmingham, Bristol, East Midlands, Edinburgh, Leeds/Bradford (begins 23 May 2027), London–Gatwick, London–Luton, London–Stansted, Manchester, Newcastle upon Tyne
LOT Polish Airlines	Seasonal: Warsaw–Radom
Lufthansa	Seasonal: Munich
Marabu	Seasonal: Hamburg
Marathon Airlines	Seasonal charter: Innsbruck
Norwegian Air Shuttle	Seasonal: Copenhagen, Oslo
Ryanair	Seasonal: Bergamo, Bologna, Budapest, London–Stansted, Nuremberg, Rome–Fiumicino, Vienna
Scandinavian Airlines	Seasonal charter: Gothenburg, Stavanger, Stockholm–Arlanda
Sky Alps	Seasonal: Bolzano
Sky Express	Corfu, Kefalonia, Sitia, Zakynthos
Smartwings	Seasonal: Prague; Seasonal charter: Bratislava, Brno, Budapest, Ostrava
Sunclass Airlines	Seasonal charter: Copenhagen, Helsinki, Oslo, Stockholm–Arlanda
Sundor	Seasonal: Tel Aviv
Transavia	Seasonal: Amsterdam, Paris–Orly
TUI fly Netherlands	Seasonal: Amsterdam
Volotea	Seasonal: Bari

== Statistics ==
Annual passenger traffic
Year	Flights	Domestic passengers	International passengers	Total passengers	% annual change
1994	1,648	11,650	161,229	172,879	Steady
1995	1,898	14,786	198,300	213,058	▲23.2%
1996	1,906	18,347	183,933	202,280	▼5.1%
1997	2,043	**20,177**	217,774	237,951	▲17.6%
1998	2,250	18,832	244,561	263,393	▲10.7%
1999	1,837	14,213	227,932	242,145	▼8.1%
2000	2,331	16,933	282,482	299,415	▲23.7%
2001	2,208	15,025	286,857	301,882	▲0.8%
2002	2,337	13,257	315,791	329,048	▲9.0%
2003	3,011	15,690	283,162	298,852	▼9.2%
2004	3,156	17,613	271,362	288,975	▼3.3%
2005	3,061	16,701	284,152	300,853	▲4.1%
2006	3,014	17,654	270,901	288,555	▼4.1%
2007	3,260	19,673	302,088	321,761	▲11.5%
2008	3,256	17,715	310,404	328,119	▲2.0%
2009	3,034	15,690	295,233	310,923	▼5.2%
2010	2,758	6,343	286,105	292,448	▼5.9%
2011	2,728	4,891	289,265	294,156	▲0.6%
2012	2,858	4,629	284,206	288,835	▼1.8%
2013	3,166	7,758	308,607	316,365	▲9.5%
2014	3,590	5,861	352,384	358,245	▲13.2%
2015	3,940	8,284	380,011	388,295	▲8.4%
2016	4,510	18,570	454,300	472,870	▲21.8%
2017	5,295	12,771	532,879	569,082	▲20.3%
2018	5,394	8,152	541,283	583,666	▲2.6%
2019	5,592	16,763	609,027	625,790	▲7.2%
2020	2,342	5,561	155,847	161,408	▼74.2%
2021	4,520	11,433	360,663	372,096	▲**130.5%**
2022	6,610	12,973	760,614	773,587	▲107.9%
2023	6,684	12,642	804,564	817,206	▲5.9%
2024	6,712	14,357	810,537	824,894	▲0.9%
2025	**7,013**	13,264	**862,698**	**875,962**	▲6.2%

The record (highest) figure to date is highlighted in bold

=== Traffic statistics by country (2024) ===
Traffic by country at Aktion National Airport (2024)
Place	Country	Total passengers
1	United Kingdom	230,024
2	Germany	114,705
3	Netherlands	92,010
4	Denmark	73,971
5	Sweden	61,619
6	Italy	55,446
7	Norway	36,130
8	Austria	28,381
9	Czech Republic	28,177
10	Finland	27,547
11	Hungary	20,139
12	Greece	14,357
13	Israel	11,897
14	Poland	9,443
15	Cyprus	8,081

== Accidents and incidents ==
- On 14 July 1996, a NATO-operated E-3 Sentry (serial number LX-N90457) overran the runway and crashed into a sea wall when the pilot attempted to abort takeoff after thinking the aircraft had ingested birds. There were only minor injuries and no fatalities, however, the fuselage broke, causing total loss of the aircraft. During the investigation of the incident, no indications of bird ingestion were found. The aircraft was subsequently written off.

== See also ==
- Transport in Greece
