= Naples International Airport =

Main airport serving Naples, Italy

Naples-Capodichino International Airport Aeroporto internazionale di Napoli-Capodichino "Ugo Niutta"
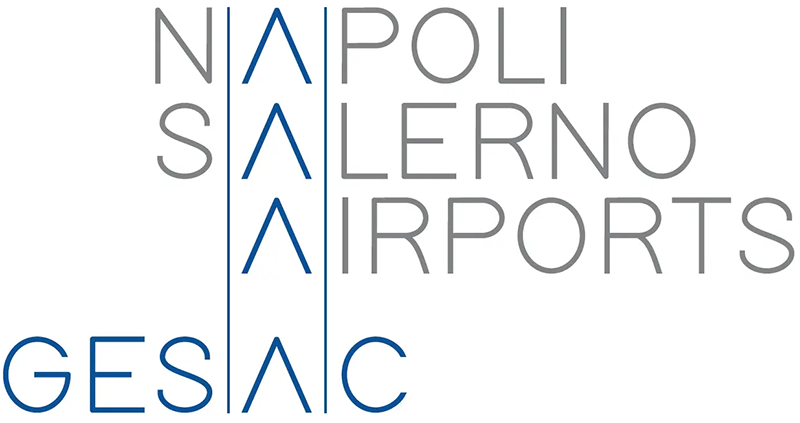

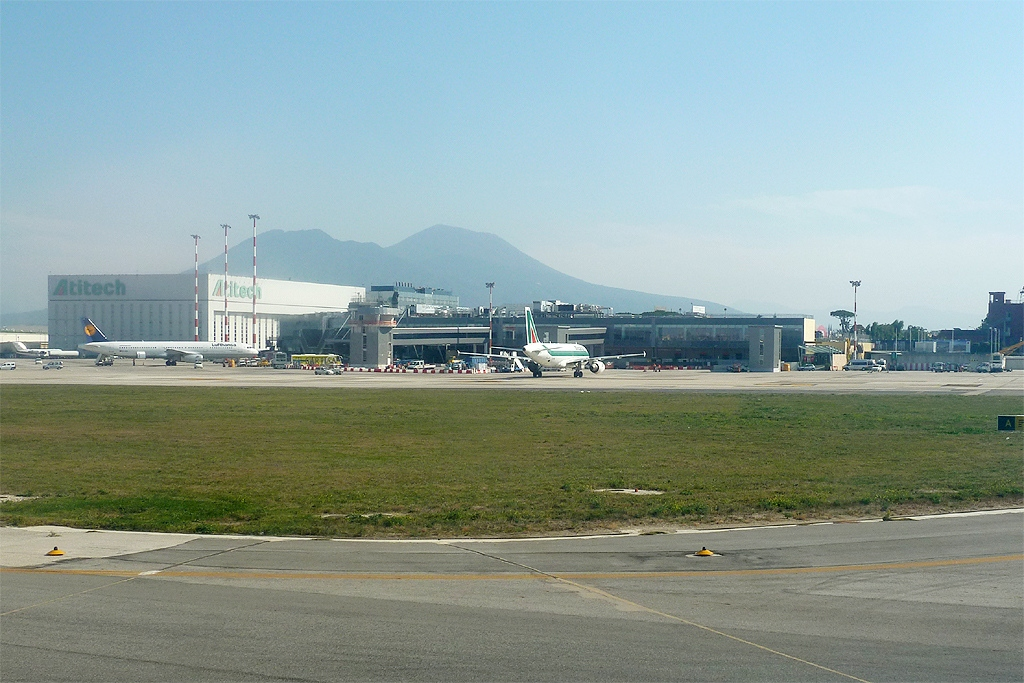
- IATA: NAP; ICAO: LIRN; WMO: 16289

Summary
- Airport type: Public/Military
- Operator: GE.S.A.C. S.p.a.
- Serves: Naples; Metropolitan City of Naples; Campania region
- Location: Capodichino (San Pietro a Patierno), Naples, Campania, Italy
- Opened: 1950; 76 years ago
- Operating base for: easyJet; Ryanair; Volotea; Wizz Air
- Built: 1910
- Elevation AMSL: 294 ft (90 m)
- Coordinates: 40°53′04″N 014°17′27″E
- Website: https://www.aeroportodinapoli.it/en/

Map
- Location within Campania Location within Italy

Runways
Direction	Length		Surface
Direction	m	ft	Surface
06/24	2,628	8,622	Asphalt

Statistics (2024)
- Passengers: 12,650,478
- Passenger change 23–24: ▲2.1%
- Movements: 86,498
- Movements change 23–24: ▼ -2.8%
- Cargo (tons): 9,467
- Cargo change 23–24: ▼ -13.1%
- Source: Italian AIP at EUROCONTROL; Statistics from Assaeroporti

Naples-Capodichino International Airport (IATA: NAP, ICAO: LIRN) (Italian: Aeroporto internazionale di Napoli-Capodichino "Ugo Niutta") is the international airport serving Naples, its metropolitan city and the Campania region. Located 3.2 NM (5.9 km; 3.7 mi) north-northeast of the city in Naples, within the Capodichino area of the San Pietro a Patierno district, the airport is officially named after decorated WWI pilot Ugo Niutta.

In 2025, the airport handled 13,271,522 passengers, making it the fourth-busiest airport in Italy and the busiest in Southern Italy, according to the Assaeroporti rankings. The airport serves as a base for easyJet, Ryanair, Volotea and Wizz Air.

== History ==
=== Origins ===
The former Campo di Marte, established by Joachim Murat in 1816 and later known as Piazza d'Armi, began to be used for the first aviation experiments. The flat, 44-hectare site, diamond-shaped and situated 72 metres above sea level, was ideally suited for the aircraft that were then taking their first steps.

The history of Capodichino Airport began in the early 20th century. On 5 May 1910, three foreign aviators and one Italian aviator carried out the first aircraft demonstrations on the then Campo di Marte, a large flat area that had previously been used during the Bourbon period for military training and displays. Sporting aviation events continued to be held until 1913.

On 23 April 1912, at the initiative of the Circolo Aeronautico Napoletano, Rosina Ferrario, the first Italian woman to obtain a pilot's licence and the seventh woman in the world to do so, took flight. During the exhibition, while flying over Naples, she dropped red carnations as a tribute to the city.

Following the bombing of Naples on the night of 10–11 March 1918 by the German Zeppelin LZ 104, which departed from Bulgaria and dropped 6,400 kilograms (14,100 lb) of bombs, striking the Pattison shipyard, the city centre and the Ilva Bagnoli steelworks, causing around thirty deaths, it was decided to expand the airfield. The event led to a parliamentary inquiry regarding the city's inadequate air defence and to measures aimed at strengthening the airport.

In 1919, a civil air terminal was opened to serve 17 airliners operated by various airlines.

=== Military airport ===
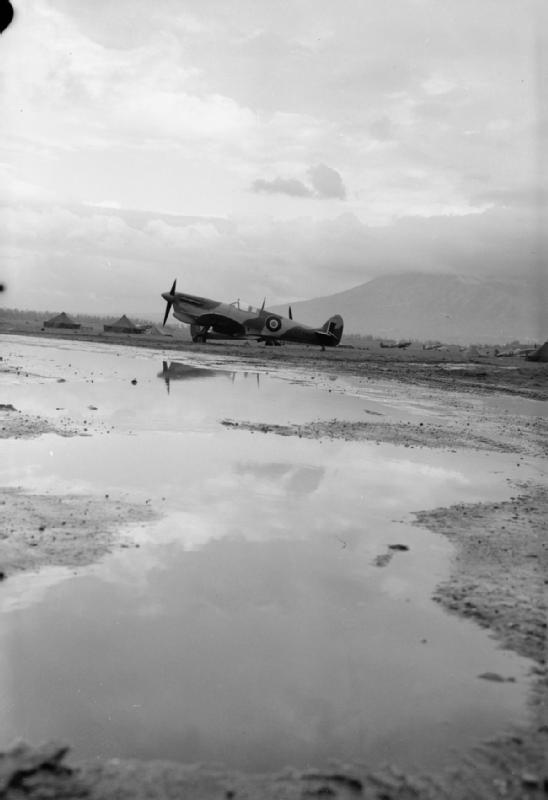
A Royal Air Force aircraft at Capodichino during World War II

After being used as an airfield during the final year of World War I, it was developed as a military airport under the name Campo di Marte Military Airport of the Regia Aeronautica and was intended to serve as the home of the Accademia Aeronautica. Two hangars were built next to the entrance, which at the time was located on Via Nuovo Tempio, one of them being capable of accommodating a small airship. The airport was named after aviator Ugo Niutta on 19 June 1921.

Following the end of the Great War, the Regia Aeronautica took possession of the airport and carried out an initial extension of the runway. By Royal Decree No. 444 of 1 March 1925, several plots of land were expropriated. A new entrance was opened from Piazza Capodichino (now Piazza Giuseppe Di Vittorio).

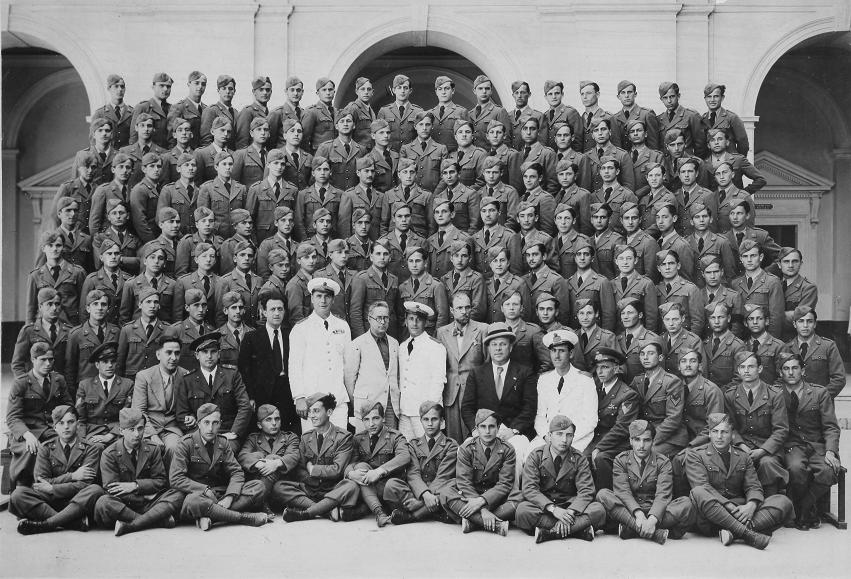
Specialists School of the Regia Aeronautica at Capodichino, class of 1935

From 1935 to 1939, the airport was home to the Scuola specialisti dell'Aeronautica Militare. During the late 1930s and early 1940s, the runway was further developed along a new alignment.

During World War II, the airport hosted the 22º Gruppo autonomo caccia terrestre, organised into four squadrons (359th, 362nd, 369th and 371st Squadrons), operating a mixed fleet of Macchi C.202 Folgore, Reggiane Re.2001, Macchi C.200 and Fiat CR.42CN fighter aircraft for night operations. At the end of February, the unit also received Dewoitine D.520 fighters. The 371st Fighter Squadron of the Regia Aeronautica was equipped with Macchi C.202 Folgore aircraft, while in March the first Reggiane Re.2005 Sagittario fighters arrived.

Following the Allied landings, the airport was used extensively by Allied air forces during the Italian campaign. It was first used by No. 324 Wing RAF, with its five squadrons of Supermarine Spitfires, in 1943, and was subsequently taken over by the United States Army Air Forces, then the air component of the United States Army. The Twelfth Air Force used the airport as a base for the following units:

- 79th Fighter Group, January 1944 – May 1944, Curtiss P-40 Warhawk and Republic P-47 Thunderbolt
- 47th Bombardment Group, 22 March 1944 – 25 April 1944, Douglas A-20 Havoc
- 33rd Fighter Group, 15 April 1944 – 28 May 1944, Republic P-47 Thunderbolt
- 332nd Fighter Group, 15 April 1944 – 28 March 1944, Bell P-39 Airacobra

After the combat units were withdrawn, the Air Transport Command began using the airport as a major hub for cargo aircraft and for the transit of aircraft and personnel returning from operations.

In the spring of 1946, the Italian Air Force assigned the 10º Gruppo to the airport, where it remained until 16 June 1956. In 1948, the Allied authorities carried out a further extension of the runway, increasing its length to 2,100 metres.

On 1 September 1953, the 12º Gruppo caccia also arrived and remained until 16 June 1956. From 1948 to 1956, the airport was home to the 4º Stormo and subsequently the 4th Interceptor Air Brigade. In 1957, the 86th Anti-Submarine Group arrived, equipped with Grumman S2F Tracker aircraft, and remained there until 1970.

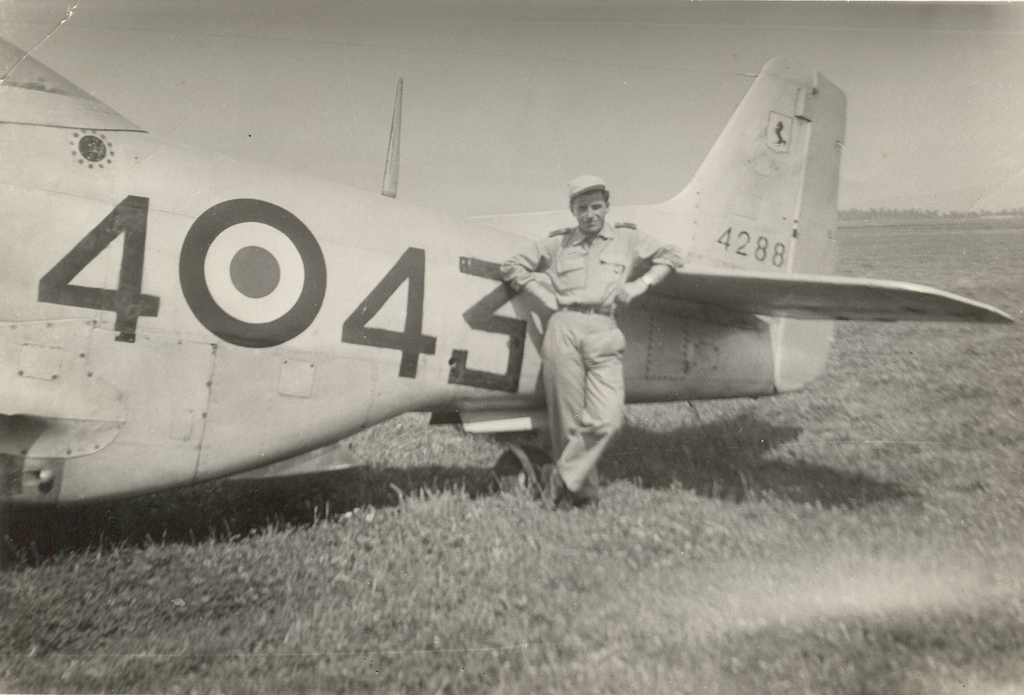
An F-51D Mustang of the 4th Wing while stationed at Capodichino

From the immediate post-war years onwards, Capodichino also progressively became an important maintenance centre for the Italian Air Force. This period began on 1 January 1948 with the establishment of the 5th Aircraft Technical Department (5º Reparto Tecnico Aeromobili, 5º R.T.A.) as part of the organisational restructuring of the Italian Air Force. On 1 November 1985, it was redesignated as the 5th Aircraft Maintenance Group (5º Gruppo Manutenzione Velivoli, 5º G.M.V.).

During this period, the unit was entrusted with the maintenance and overhaul of a wide range of training aircraft, including the Lockheed T-33 and the Aermacchi MB-326 operated by the Basic and Advanced Jet Flying School at Amendola. Following the retirement of the Aermacchi MB-326 in 1996, the unit's mission was redefined from a third-level aircraft maintenance centre to the management of Air Ground Equipment.

=== Civilian airport ===
From 1950, Capodichino Airport was also opened to civilian air traffic. To accommodate this new role, the runway was further extended to 2,150 metres (7,050 ft). From that date, the airport underwent continuous development, culminating in its privatisation in 1997 and an investment programme worth €145 million.

==== Privatisation and Gesac ====
In August 1997, the public shareholders sold 35% of their respective holdings to British Airports Authority, a British group that was a leading airport operator worldwide. With the acquisition of the majority shareholding by BAA, Naples became the first Italian airport to be privatised. The privatisation stemmed from the awareness among the public shareholders (the Municipality and Province of Naples) and the company's management of the strategic importance of private-sector management for the development of both the airport and the surrounding region. In the same year, Terminal 2 was opened; it was later demolished in 2015.

In May 1999, BAA transferred a 5% shareholding to Interporto Campano S.p.A. (a participation now held through Aliport S.r.l.).

=== Recent developments ===
In June 2006, the ADI Consortium (Airport Development Investment Ltd.), led by the Spanish group Ferrovial, acquired ownership of BAA and became the controlling shareholder of the airport management company.

On 21 December 2010, following an agreement signed on 1 October, the transfer of the majority shareholding in Gesac was completed, marking the definitive transfer of control from the Spanish group Ferrovial to the Italian infrastructure fund manager F2i.

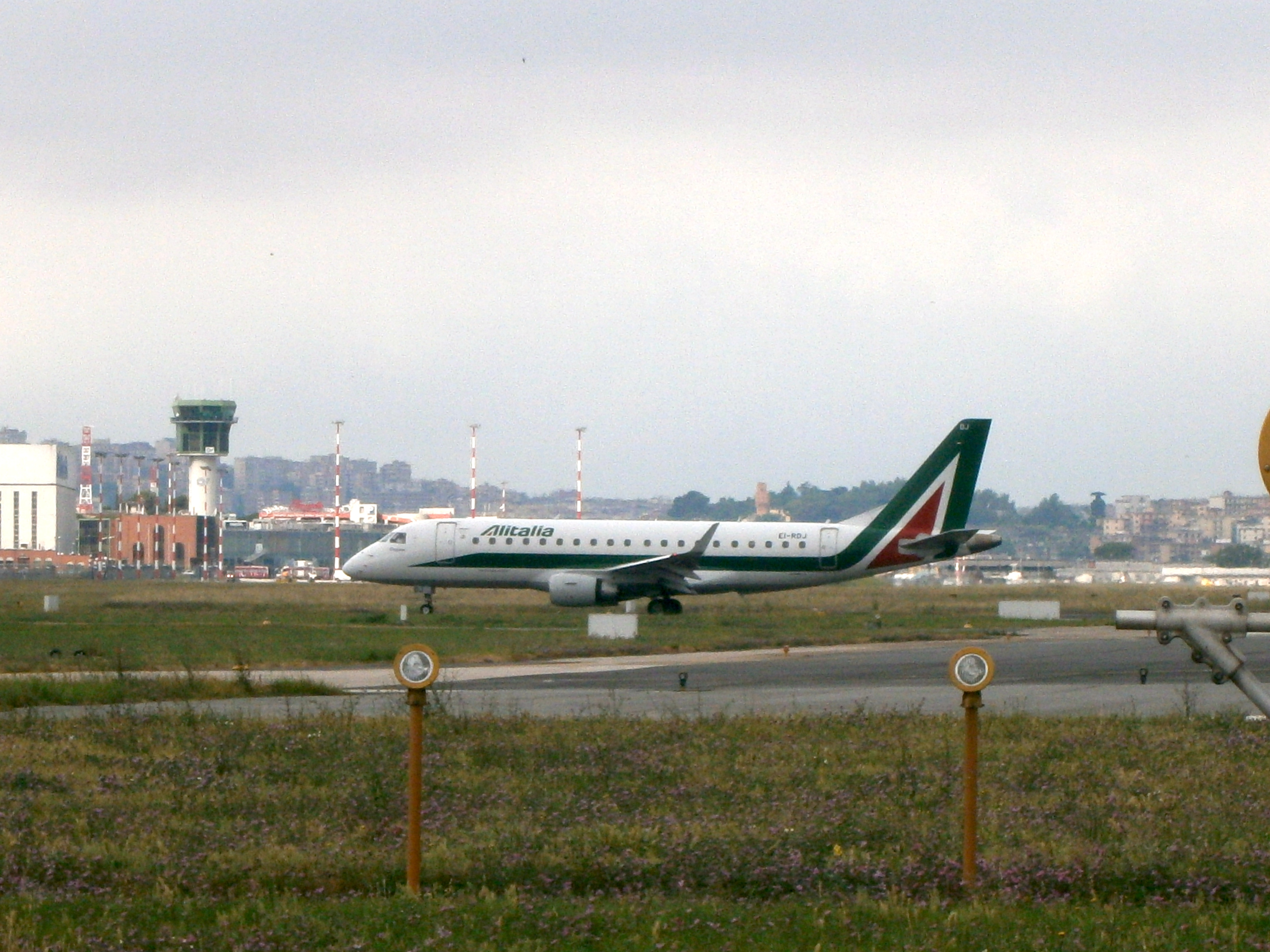
An Embraer 175 of Alitalia exiting the runway.

On 6 February 2015, F2i signed an agreement for the sale of 49% of F2i Aeroporti S.p.A. to a consortium composed of Ardian (60%) and Crédit Agricole Assurances (40%). Following this transaction, F2i Aeroporti changed its corporate name to 2i Aeroporti S.p.A..

On 1 March 2016, the airport inaugurated the Archaeological Airport (Aeroporto Archeologico), a permanent exhibition created by Gesac and the Regional Superintendence of Campania in collaboration with the Italian Ministry of Culture. The exhibition includes works such as statues of Nike, Hermes, Triptolemus and Urania from the archaeological museums of Naples and Capua, introducing travellers to Italy's cultural heritage upon arrival at the airport.

On 24 October 2019, the merger of Aeroporto di Salerno S.p.A. into Gesac S.p.A. was formally completed, creating an integrated and complementary airport system for the Campania region.

In June 2005, Eurofly began seasonal services to New York City using Airbus A330s; this was the airport's first transatlantic flight. In 2010, the airline merged with Meridiana to form Meridiana Fly, which maintained the route. The service ceased in 2017, ahead of Meridiana Fly's rebranding as Air Italy. In May 2019, United Airlines launched seasonal flights to Newark aboard a Boeing 767.

From May 2022, transatlantic services to the United States resumed, operated by United Airlines, and continued until October.

In 2023, United Airlines expanded its operations by adding a second daily flight to Newark from June to October.

In 2024, the two daily United Airlines flights to Newark were joined by direct services to New York–JFK and Atlanta operated by Delta Air Lines, direct services to Philadelphia and Chicago O'Hare operated by American Airlines, and, for the first time, a direct service to Canada, with flights to Montréal operated by Air Canada.

== Infrastructure ==
=== Airfield ===
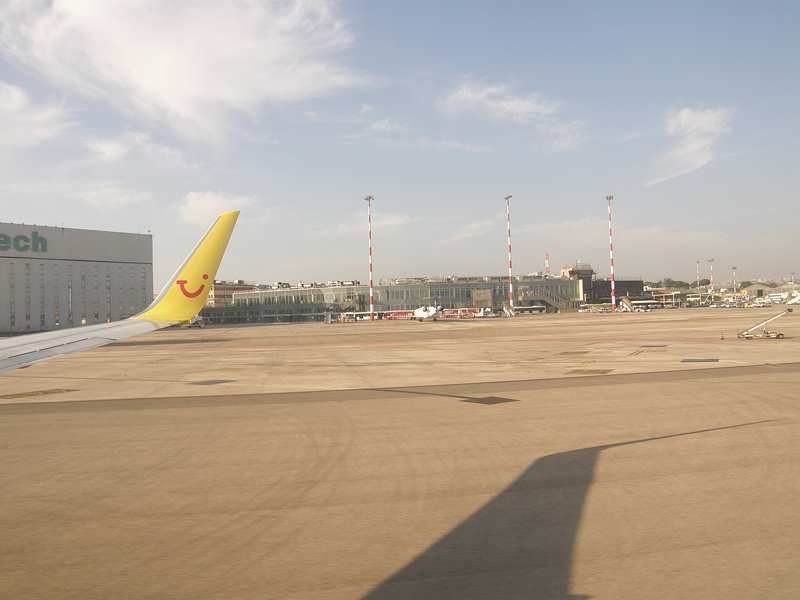
View of the runway.

The airport has a single runway (orientation: 06/24 – 2,628 m × 45 m (8,622 ft × 148 ft) – resistance: PCN90/F/B/W/T – assistance: PAPI, ILS) in bituminous conglomerate and asphalt concrete, with one taxiway. It is equipped with PAPI and ILS systems. According to ICAO classification, the runway falls within category 4D and is capable of supporting a load up to PCN 90/F/B/W/T, making it suitable for accommodating medium and large aircraft. The magnetic orientation is 056°/236°.

Runway at Naples International Airport
NE	Length	Width	SW
06 →	2,628 m 8,622 ft	45 m 148 ft	← 24
Terminal area and apron

Both runway thresholds are equipped with PAPI systems for visual glide path guidance and Category I ILS installations, ensuring safe landings even in reduced visibility conditions. The taxiway system consists of two main taxiways: the southern taxiway (TS) and the northern taxiway (TN). The latter is approximately 23 metres (75 ft) wide and classified as PCN 78/F/B/X, while TS has similar characteristics but a narrower width of approximately 15 metres (49 ft). The two taxiways are connected to the runway and aprons through numerous connecting taxiways designated by the letters A to M, ensuring smooth aircraft movements.

The airport site covers an area of approximately 233 hectares, of which 8 hectares are occupied by the passenger terminal and parking facilities. An adjacent area hosts a United States military base covering a further 41 hectares. The airport is situated at an elevation of 89.61 metres (294.0 ft) above mean sea level, with a transition altitude of 8,000 feet (approximately 2,440 metres (8,010 ft)).

The airport consists of three aircraft aprons:

- Apron 1 comprises 26 stands, of which 6 are self-manoeuvring stands and 20 are nose-in stands.
- Apron 2 comprises 6 nose-in stands.
- Apron 3 comprises 4 nose-in stands equipped with an A-VDGS (Advanced Visual Docking Guidance System).
- The airfield includes the main southern taxiway TS, an additional northern taxiway TN, and the connecting taxiways A, B, BC, C, D, E, F, G, H, L and M.

In the past, these areas were divided into three principal aprons, known as Apron 1, Apron 2 and Apron 3, equipped with Advanced Visual Docking Guidance Systems (A-VDGS). The taxiway and apron infrastructure is designed to support a maximum wheel load of approximately 61,600 pounds (more than 28,000 kilograms), making the airport compatible with most commercial aircraft currently in service.

The airport is equipped with advanced technological systems that allow precise aircraft landings in low-visibility conditions, including ILS systems available for both runway 24 and runway 06.

=== Operations ===
The airport retained the status of a military airport open to civil air traffic until 2008, when Ministerial Decree of 14 February 2008 (Official Gazette No. 105 of 6 May 2008) modified its previous status and reclassified it as a civil airport open to military traffic. The airport handles an average of approximately 170 aircraft movements (take-offs and landings) per day.

=== Terminal ===
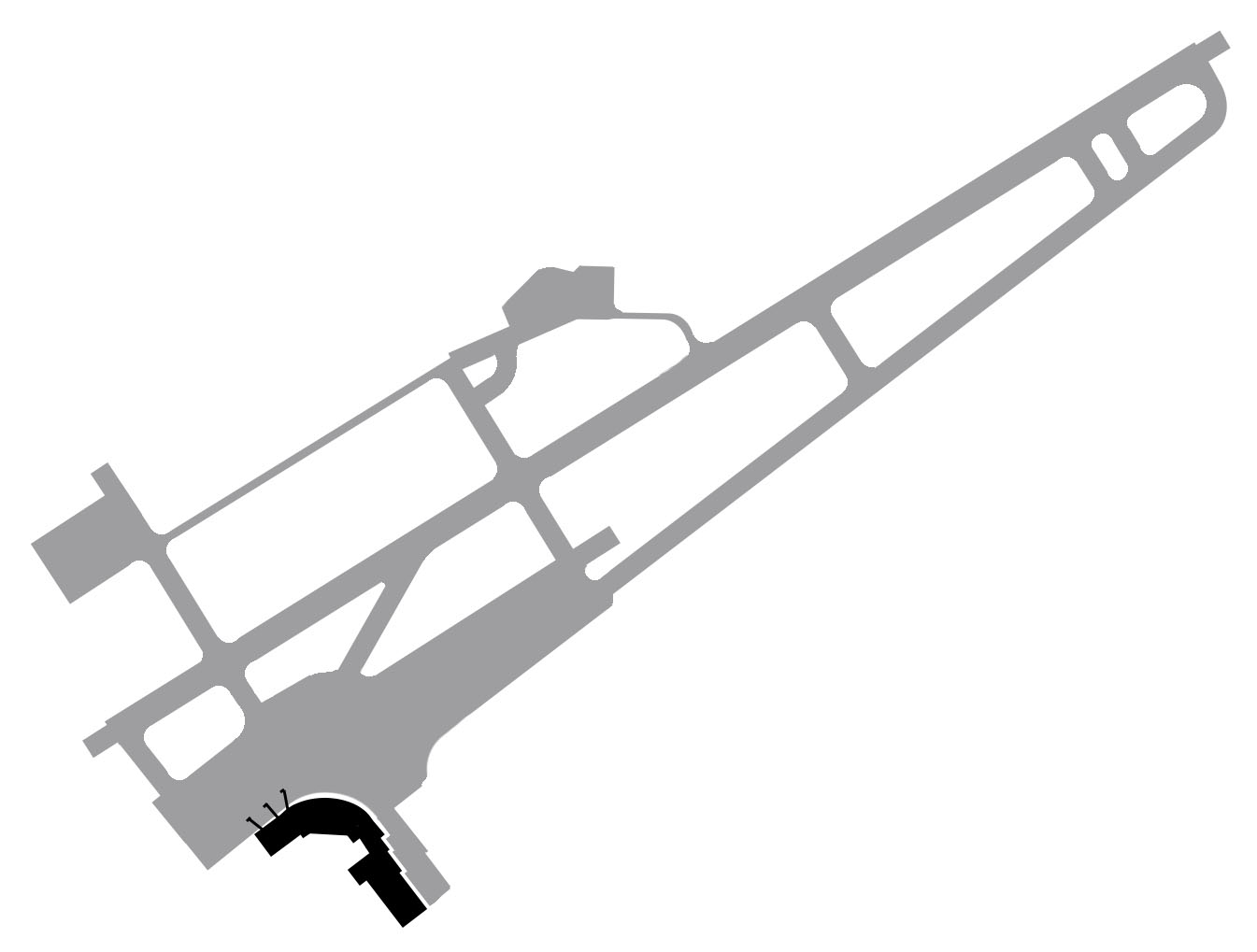
Map of the airport

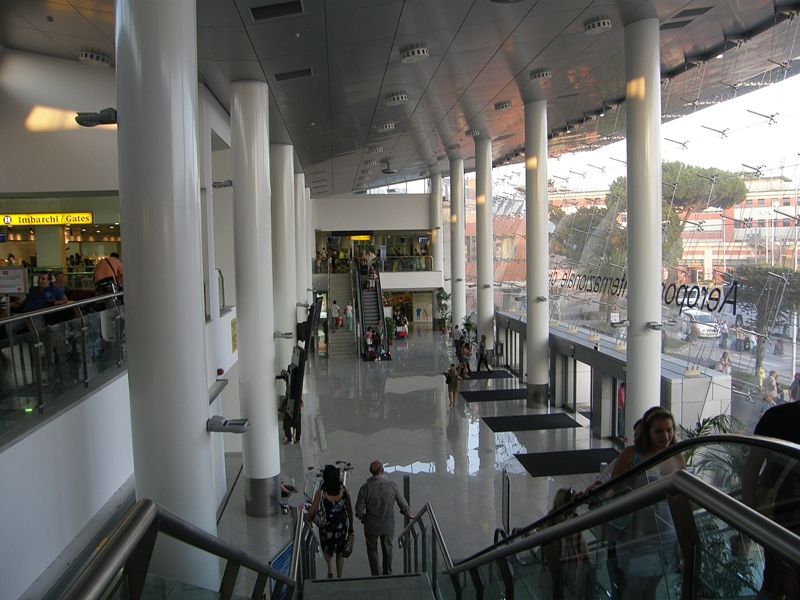
Entrance and check-in area

Terminal 1, which operates daily from 3:30 am to 10:30 pm, is divided into separate departure and arrival areas, both located within the same building. The departures area is equipped with 59 conventional check-in counters, supplemented by 13 automated self-service check-in kiosks, while the boarding area comprises 22 gates. The terminal contains shops, bars, restaurants and duty-free outlets. Lounges for business-class passengers and frequent flyers are also available. Free Wi-Fi is available throughout the terminal.

A distinctive service is the Al Volo desk, operated by the Municipality of Naples, which allows Italian citizens departing within 48 hours to request the exceptional issuance of a paper identity card. For security and immigration procedures, the terminal is equipped with 11 security screening lanes and 16 automated passport control gates (eGates). The arrivals area is equipped with seven baggage reclaim belts.

In 1995, Terminal 2 was inaugurated for charter flights, and in 2000 Charles, Prince of Wales inaugurated the new departures hall. In August 2015, Terminal 2 was dismantled and was subsequently demolished in September 2015. The site is planned to accommodate Capodichino station on Line 1 of the Naples Metro.

== Airlines and destinations ==
The following airlines operate regular scheduled and charter flights at Naples Airport:

Airlines	Destinations
Aegean Airlines	Athens
Aer Lingus	Seasonal: Dublin
Air Arabia	Casablanca
Air Cairo	Sharm El Sheikh; Seasonal: Hurghada
Air Canada	Seasonal: Montréal–Trudeau
Air France	Paris–Charles de Gaulle
Air Serbia	Seasonal: Belgrade
airBaltic	Seasonal: Riga
American Airlines	Seasonal: Chicago–O’Hare, Philadelphia
Austrian Airlines	Vienna
Bluebird Airways	Tel Aviv
British Airways	London–Heathrow
Brussels Airlines	Seasonal: Brussels
Delta Air Lines	Seasonal: Atlanta, New York–JFK
easyJet	Alicante, Amsterdam, Athens, Barcelona, Basel/Mulhouse, Berlin, Bordeaux (begins 4 December 2026), Catania, Geneva, Gran Canaria, Liverpool, London–Gatwick, Luxembourg, Lyon, Manchester, Marrakech, Milan–Malpensa, Munich, Nice, Palermo, Paris–Orly, Prague, Sharm El Sheikh, Strasbourg, Zurich; Seasonal: Bristol, Cagliari, Corfu, Dubrovnik, Edinburgh, Fuerteventura, Giza (begins 2 December 2026), Heraklion, Hurghada, Ibiza, Kefalonia, Kos, Lampedusa, London–Luton, Malta, Menorca, Mykonos, Nantes, Olbia, Palma de Mallorca, Porto, Preveza, Rhodes, Santorini, Skiathos, Split, Zakynthos
Eurowings	Düsseldorf, Stuttgart; Seasonal: Berlin, Cologne/Bonn, Hamburg
flydubai	Dubai–International
Iberia Express	Madrid
Israir Airlines	Seasonal: Tel Aviv
ITA Airways	Milan–Linate, Rome–Fiumicino
Jet2.com	Seasonal: Birmingham, East Midlands, Edinburgh, Glasgow, Leeds/Bradford, London–Gatwick, London–Stansted, Manchester
KLM	Amsterdam
Lufthansa	Frankfurt, Munich
Lufthansa City Airlines	Munich
Luxair	Luxembourg
Neos	Seasonal: Sharm El Sheikh
Norwegian Air Shuttle	Seasonal: Billund, Copenhagen, Oslo
Royal Air Maroc	Casablanca
Ryanair	Alghero, Barcelona, Bergamo, Bucharest–Otopeni, Budapest, Cagliari, Catania, Charleroi, Dublin, Edinburgh, Gdańsk, Genoa, Katowice (begins 1 December 2026), Kraków, Lisbon, London–Luton, London–Stansted, Madrid, Málaga, Malta, Manchester, Marrakech, Milan–Malpensa, Palermo, Paphos, Prague, Seville, Sofia, Tenerife–South, Trieste, Turin, Valencia, Venice, Verona, Vienna, Warsaw–Modlin (ends 24 October 2026), Warsaw-Chopin (begins 25 October 2026), Wrocław; Seasonal: Beauvais, Chania, Copenhagen, Corfu, Eindhoven, Kaunas, Marseille, Memmingen Menorca, Mykonos, Nuremberg, Palma de Mallorca, Rhodes, Santorini, Shannon, Thessaloniki, Toulouse, Zagreb, Zakynthos
Scandinavian Airlines	Copenhagen, Seasonal: Stockholm
Sky Alps	Mostar
Sundor	Tel Aviv
Swiss International Air Lines	Zürich
Transavia	Amsterdam, Paris–Orly
TUI Airways	Seasonal: Birmingham, East Midlands, Glasgow, Manchester, Newcastle upon Tyne
TUI fly Belgium	Seasonal: Brussels
Turkish Airlines	Istanbul
TUS Airways	Tel Aviv
United Airlines	Seasonal: Newark
Volotea	Athens, Bilbao, Genoa, Nantes, Palermo, Turin, Venice; Seasonal: Aalborg, Heraklion, Kefalonia, Lampedusa, Lourdes, Lyon, Mykonos, Olbia, Preveza/Lefkada, Rhodes, Santorini, Skiathos, Split, Zakynthos
Vueling	Barcelona, Bilbao (begins 4 December 2026)
Wizz Air	Barcelona (begins 14 December 2026), Basel/Mulhouse (begins 2 March 2027), Bilbao (begins 14 December 2026), Brașov, Bratislava, Bucharest–Băneasa, Budapest, Chișinău, Craiova, Madrid (begins 14 December 2026), Genoa (begins 2 March 2027), Milan–Malpensa, Nice (begins 2 March 2027), Palermo (begins 1 March 2027), Palma de Mallorca, Sharm El Sheikh, Skopje, Sofia, Tel Aviv, Tirana, Timișoara, Trieste (begins 14 December 2026), Turin (begins 1 December 2026), Valencia (begins 14 December 2026), Venice, Warsaw–Chopin, Yerevan; Seasonal: Cluj-Napoca, Hurghada (begins 2 December 2026)

Naples International Airport passenger destinations map (26 March 2026)

== Traffic and statistics ==
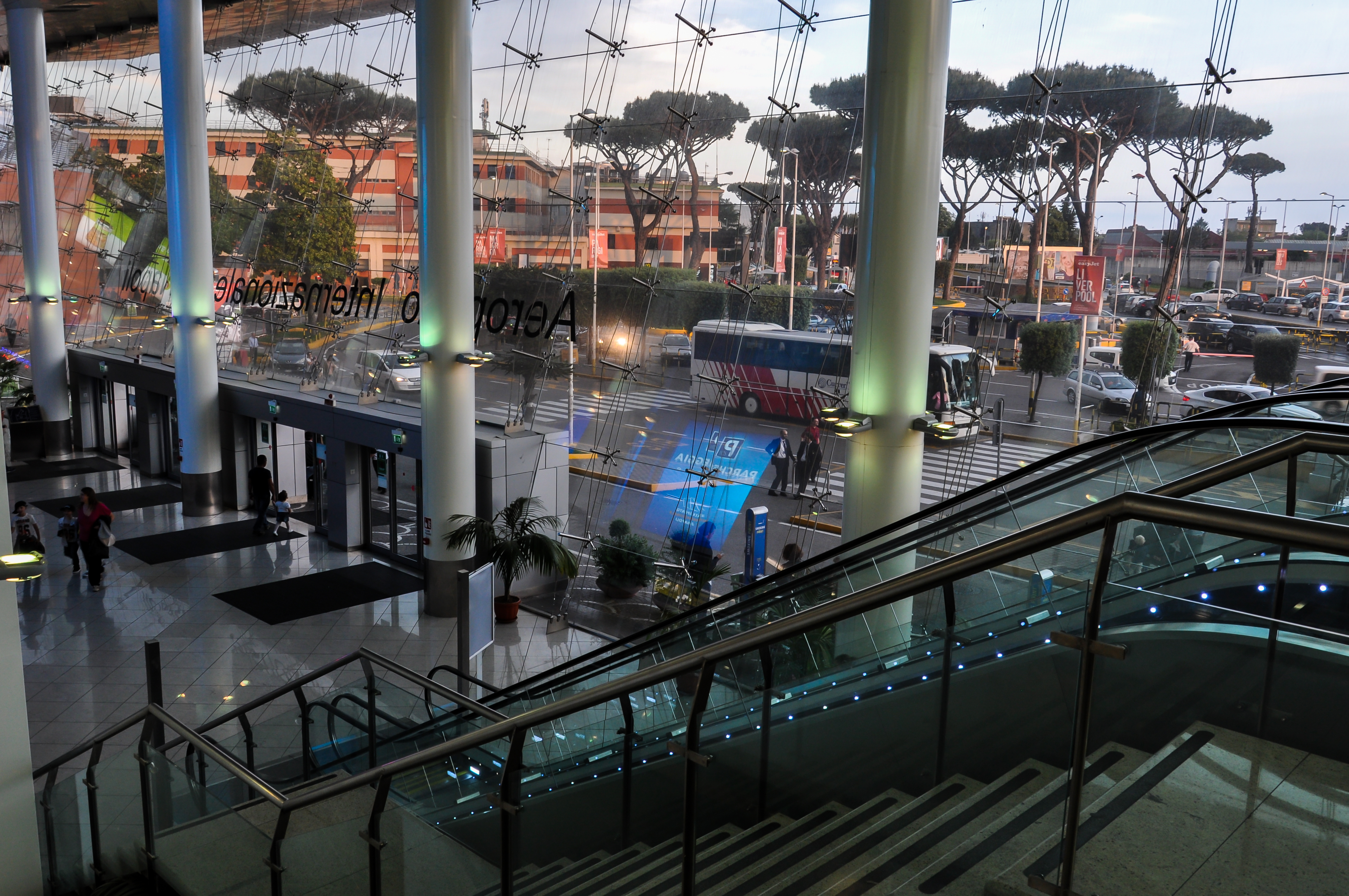
Check-in hall

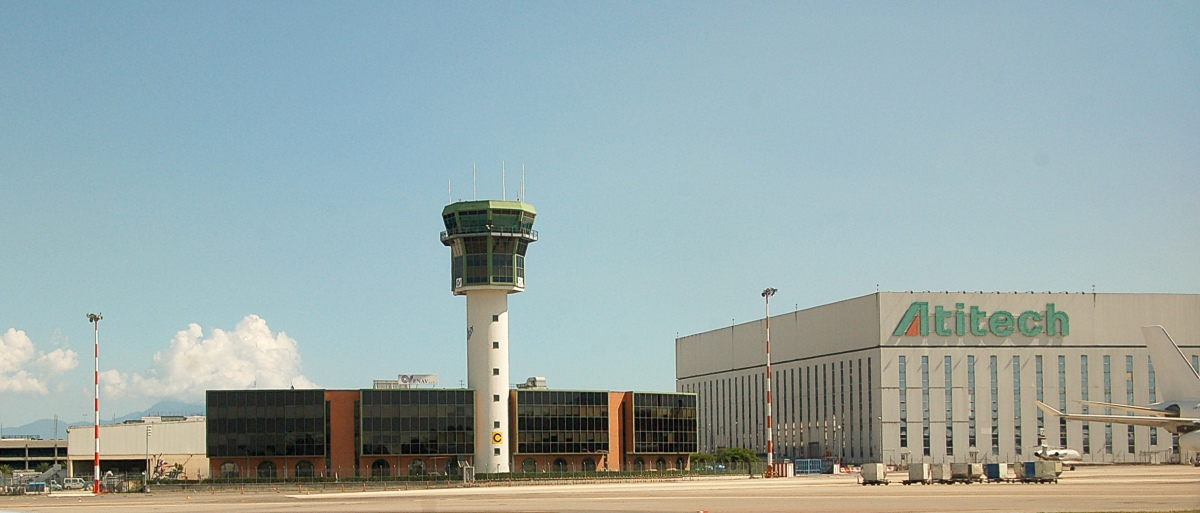
Control tower and hangars

Traffic by calendar year
	Passenger volume	Aircraft movements
2000	4,132,508	62,494
2001	4,053,791	60,916
2002	4,136,874	63,690
2003	4,587,163	65,016
2004	4,632,388	59,962
2005	4,588,695	58,002
2006	5,095,969	61,708
2007	5,775,838	72,330
2008	5,642,266	68,548
2009	5,322,161	64,032
2010	5,584,114	63,564
2011	5,768,873	62,878
2012	5,801,836	61,113
2013	5,444,422	55,940
2014	5,960,035	58,681
2015	6,163,188	60,261
2016	6,775,988	63,935
2017	8,577,507	75,013
2018	9,932,029	79,722
2019	10,860,068	82,577
2020	2,779,946	29,414
2021	4,636,501	45,333
2022	10,918,234	83,956
2023	12,394,911	89,023
2024	12,650,478	86,498
2025	13,271,522	89,275
Source: Assaeroporti

=== Top domestic destinations ===
Busiest domestic routes from NAP (2022)
Rank	Airport	Passengers
1	Milan Malpensa	828,864
2	Milan Linate	493,224
3	Milan Bergamo	457,435
4	Venice Marco Polo	447,839
5	Catania	318,577
6	Palermo	297,554
7	Turin	312,069
8	Cagliari	146,124
9	Genoa	138,473
10	Olbia	113,557
11	Verona	105,174
12	Rome Fiumicino	92,161
13	Trieste	79,317
14	Alghero	52,426

=== Top international destinations ===
Busiest international routes from NAP (2022)
Rank	Airport	Passengers
1	Paris Orly, France	376,995
2	Barcelona, Spain	347,091
3	Paris Charles de Gaulle, France	249,326
4	London Gatwick, United Kingdom	266,174
5	Munich, Germany	233,833
6	Madrid, Spain	245,122
7	Amsterdam, Netherlands	221,786
8	Vienna, Austria	171,195
9	Frankfurt, Germany	192,983
10	London Stansted, United Kingdom	172,691
11	London Heathrow, United Kingdom	180,312
12	Sharm El Sheikh, Egypt	138,174
13	Istanbul, Turkey	105,473
14	Tel Aviv, Israel	91,171
15	Geneva, Switzerland	122,705
16	Zurich, Switzerland	100,778
17	Manchester, United Kingdom	127,506
18	Dublin, Ireland	146,800
19	Budapest, Hungary	144,761
20	Nice, France	136,871
21	London Luton, United Kingdom	133,936
22	Bucharest, Romania	131,639
23	Prague, Czech Republic	112,195
24	Charleroi, Belgium	111,521
25	Berlin Brandenburg, Germany	105,561

== Ground transportation ==
=== Metro ===
As of 2026, the Capodichino station on Naples Metro's Line 1 is under construction to connect the airport with the current terminus at Naples' central station. It is expected to be finished by 2027.

=== Bus ===
Bus line Alibus, operated by ANM, connect the airport to Piazza Garibaldi and Piazza Municipio. Distance airport/centre city is about 7 km (4.3 mi). The airport is also connected to Avellino, Benevento, Caserta, Salerno, Serre and Sorrento.

=== Car ===
Capodichino is easily accessible from all the city thanks to the exit of the so-called "Tangenziale", an urban highway (A56) connecting the city of Naples to metropolitan area and highways to Rome and Caserta (A1), Salerno (A3) and Bari, Benevento and Avellino (A16). Fixed taxi rates are in use for the main destinations within the city limits of Naples from Airport to: Naples Centre, Molo Beverello (Port), Mergellina (Hydrofoils to Capri and Ischia's islands).

== Incidents and accidents ==
On 15 February 1958, a United States Air Force Douglas VC-47A Skytrain, 42-93817, c/n 13771, built as a C-47A-25-DK and upgraded, en route from its home base, Ramstein-Landstuhl Air Base, Germany, to Istanbul, departed Capodichino Airport on a flight to Athens, with 16 servicemen aboard. Following a report 30 minutes after departure when the crew reported en route at 6500 feet and switching to the Rome ATC, nothing further was heard from the flight, which never contacted Rome, nor arrived in Greece. Dense fog over the Ionian Sea and mountainous southern Italy on 17 February greatly impeded search efforts for the missing aircraft. "U.S. authorities did not exclude the possibility the plane might have been forced down in Communist Albania."

On 19 February 1958, the burned and scattered wreckage was found high on the rugged slope of Mount Vesuvius at the 1,200-metre (3,800 ft) level, about 60 m (200 ft) below the top of the cone of the volcano. A search plane first spotted the wreckage following "four days of fruitless ground, sea and air search impeded by fog, rain and snow." Patrols of U.S. servicemen, Italian soldiers and carabinieri reached the crash site four hours after it was found, battling though heavy snow, but reported no survivors amongst the 16 on board. They stated that all had been identified. According to a 1958 Associated Press report, "a surgeon said death apparently was instantaneous." There were 15 Air Force officers and men from Ramstein-Landstuhl Air Base, and one seaman of the USS Tripoli on board. The report stated that "officials declined to venture a theory on the cause of the crash except that the weather was bad and the pilot, Capt. Martin S. Schwartz of Ashland, Kentucky, had not previously flown from Capodichino field."

On 31 March 1959, a United States Navy Douglas R4D-8 crashed after takeoff due to engine failure. Three occupants out of 20 on board were killed as well as one ground worker.

== Use by U.S. military forces ==
U.S. military forces have been present on this site, primarily US Navy personnel, since 1951. Among two other facilities in Naples, Naval Support Activity Naples is a tenant of several buildings in the Northwestern area of the airport. The United States Navy handles military and civilian aircraft on this airport for logistics. It is home to U.S. Naval Forces Europe and the U.S. Sixth Fleet.

== See also ==
- List of the busiest airports in Italy
- List of airports in Italy
