= Palmair =

Tour operator in Dorset, England, 1993–2011

Palmair European
- Founded: 1993
- Ceased operations: April 2011
- Hubs: Bournemouth Airport
- Fleet size: 1 at closure
- Destinations: 14
- Parent company: R.E. Bath Travel Service (Palmair) Ltd (Now Hays Travel)
- Headquarters: Bournemouth, Dorset, England
- Key people: Peter Bath (Founder) Deceased; David Skillicorn (MD)
- Website: www.palmair.co.uk

Palmair European was a British tour operator with its head office in the Space House in Bournemouth, Dorset, England. Palmair offered charter and scheduled flights on behalf of Bath Travel. Its main base was Bournemouth Airport. Palmair have now stopped any flights for the foreseeable future and the airline has been placed into a "deep freeze" until the economic climate improves.

The company holds a United Kingdom Civil Aviation Authority Air Travel Organiser's Licence (ATOL0003).

== History ==
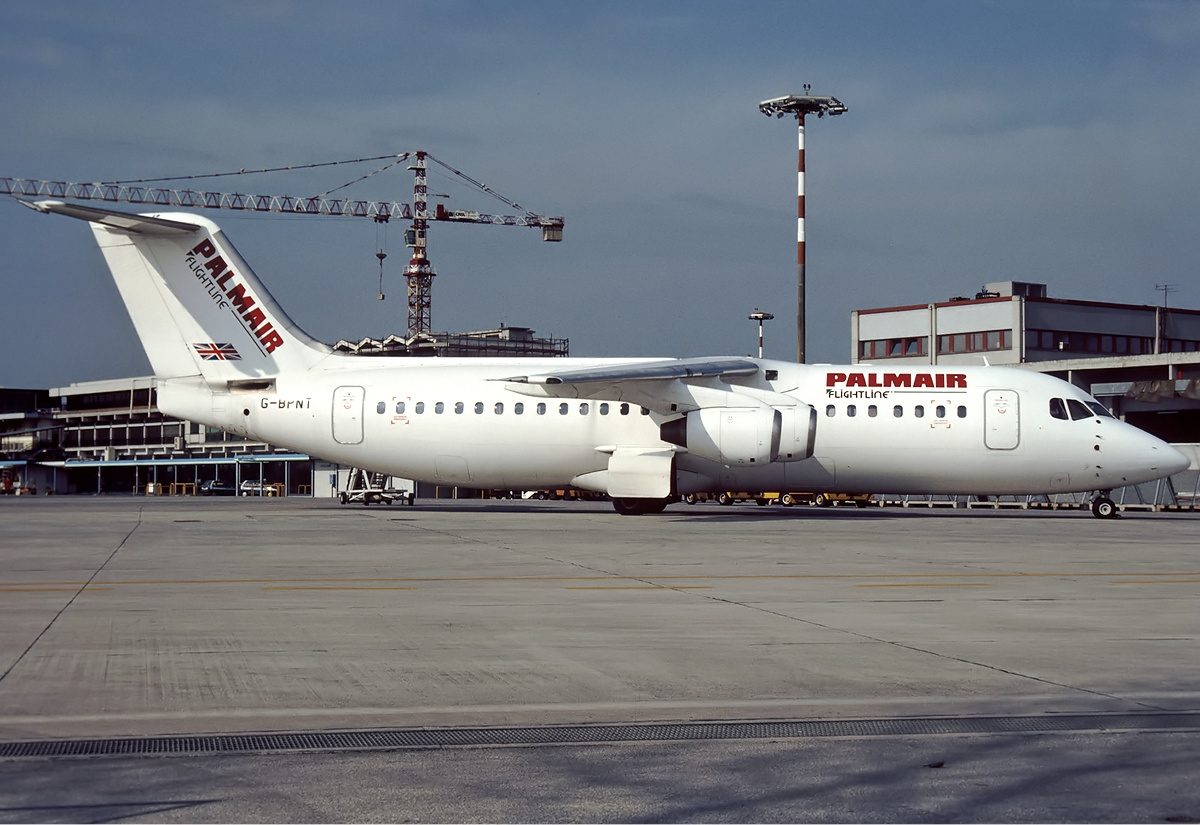
A Palmair BAe 146

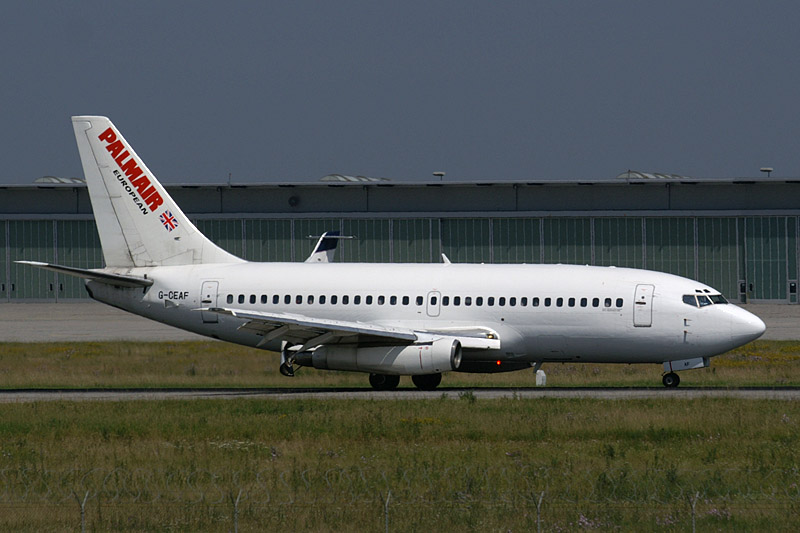
A Palmair Boeing 737-200, in old livery, lands at Stuttgart Airport, Germany. (2006)

The first Palmair charter took place in 1958 with a single flight to Palma followed a year later with just 2 flights. Over the following years the number of flights increased and expanded to a range of destinations, chartering aircraft from a number of different airlines.

In 1993 the company formed its own airline, Palmair Flightline, operating a BAe 146 aircraft. Upgraded aircraft were acquired in 1999 to reflect increased demand for capacity from Bournemouth and for the introduction of longer range routes. Until winter 1999 services was operated by Flightline, using a single BAe 146–300. In 2003 Palmair carried 75,000 passengers. In 2004 the company operated scheduled passenger flights to ten European airports, and day trips to 25 European cities.

On 22 December 2006, founder, Peter Bath, who had previously seen off every flight personally, died, aged 79.

In November 2008, European Aviation, which had been operating a Boeing 737-200 for Palmair, ceased trading meaning that the Boeing 737-200 was grounded.

For winter 2008/2009, Palmair flights were operated by Jet2.com using a Boeing 737-300.

On 9 May 2009, Palmair resumed flights with a Boeing 737-500 aircraft operated by Astraeus. The airline continued using the plane until October 2010 when it left Bournemouth Airport for the last time. The original agreement between Palmair and Astraeus was for Palmair to use the plane up until April 2012, but due to unforeseen circumstances it had to be handed back to Astraeus.

As a result, during the Winter and Summer of 2010, Thomson Airways operated Palmair's routes to Lanzarote and Tenerife. Thomson continued to operate these routes until April 2011 when Palmair finally pulled the plug. Given the current climate Palmair has been forced to cease its entire operations starting from Summer 2011. Bosses stated that they won't be issuing any new schedules for the airline in the foreseeable future and that Palmair would be placed in a deep freeze, at least until the climate improves.

The contributing factors to the downfall of Palmair was said to have been increasing competition from various low cost airlines using Bournemouth airport, rising fuel prices and the recession.

== Awards ==
=== 2003 ===
The UK consumer magazine Holiday Which? published the results of a survey of 20,000 UK air passengers, showing that Palmair was the top rated airline flying from the UK.

=== 2008 ===
Palmair was mentioned on BBC World's Fast Track on 26 June 2008, as one of the top four airlines in the world in the British Which? magazine consumer survey. In the short haul airline category Palmair was picked as the best. Palmair tied with Air New Zealand for third in the 70,000 consumer opinion responses comparing 70 worldwide airlines.

David Skillicorn, managing director of Palmair, said he was delighted. He said, "We are just little Palmair with a little Boeing 737 yet we beat the likes of Virgin Atlantic and British Airways. Singapore Airlines has 100 planes including the A380 which is the largest plane in service, on-board massages and a choice of DVDs. All we can offer is the choice of tea or coffee – that is why I feel so flattered. Coming joint third in this poll is such an amazing achievement."

== Livery ==
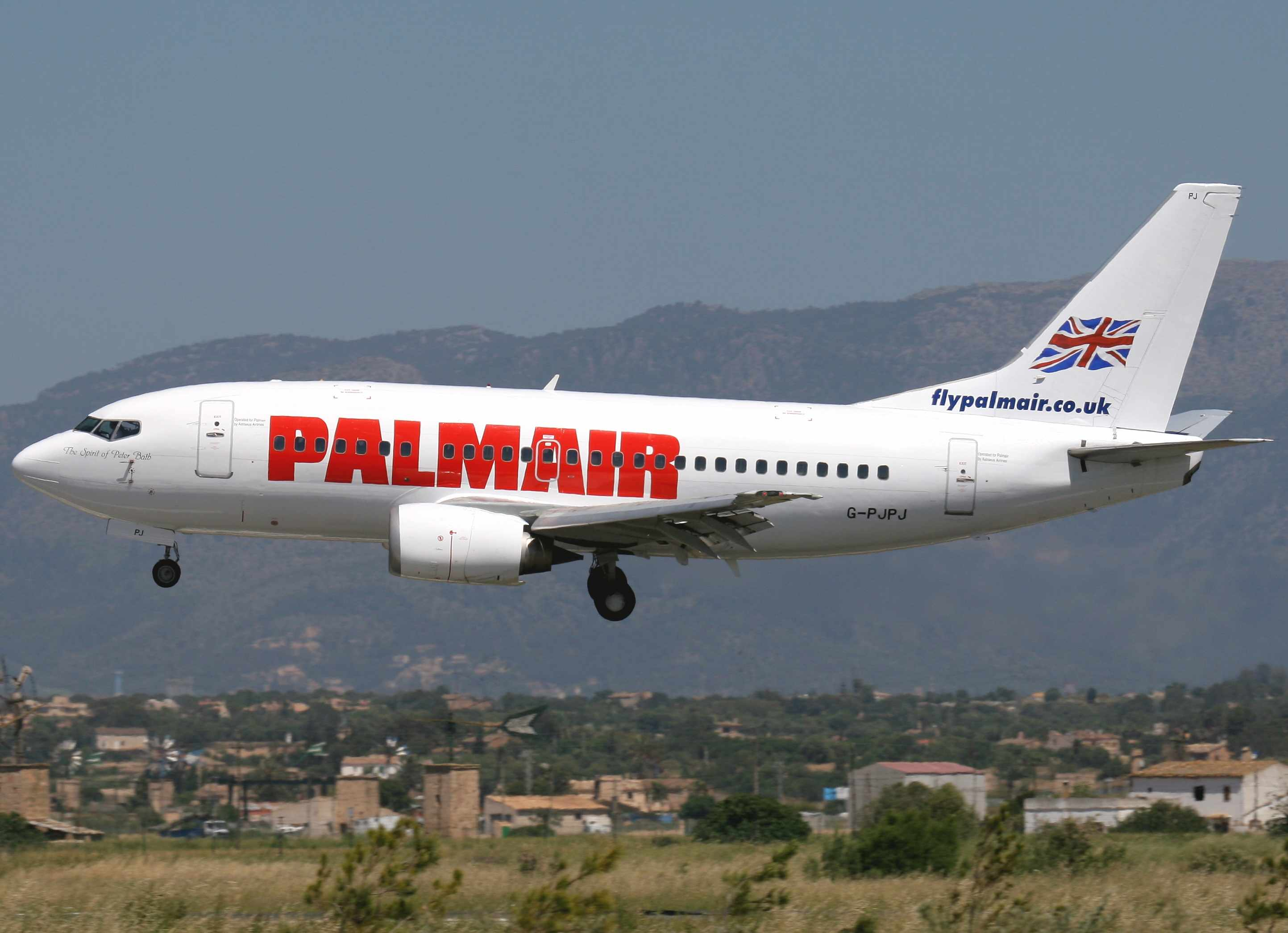
A Palmair Boeing 737-500 in new livery, operated by Astraeus. (2009)

With the airline beginning their own scheduled service operated by an Astraeus Boeing 737-500, the airline revealed a new livery at a ceremony in a hangar at Bournemouth Airport. Over 300 people turned up to the unveiling of the new livery and aircraft that has been named The Spirit of Peter Bath (the founder of Palmair). The new livery features larger tiles across the fuselage saying 'PALMAIR' and on the tail, the Union Flag and the airlines new website tiles, 'flypalmair.co.uk'.

== Fleet ==
A Boeing 737-500 operated in Palmair livery was returned to the leasing company (Astraeus Airlines).

== See also ==
- List of defunct airlines of the United Kingdom
