= Flightline =

Flightline may refer to:

- Flightline (airline) - former British airline company
- Flightline (horse) - American thoroughbred racehorse

== See also ==
- Airport apron, sometimes referred to as a "flight line"
