= Channel Express =

Airline of the United Kingdom (1978–2006)

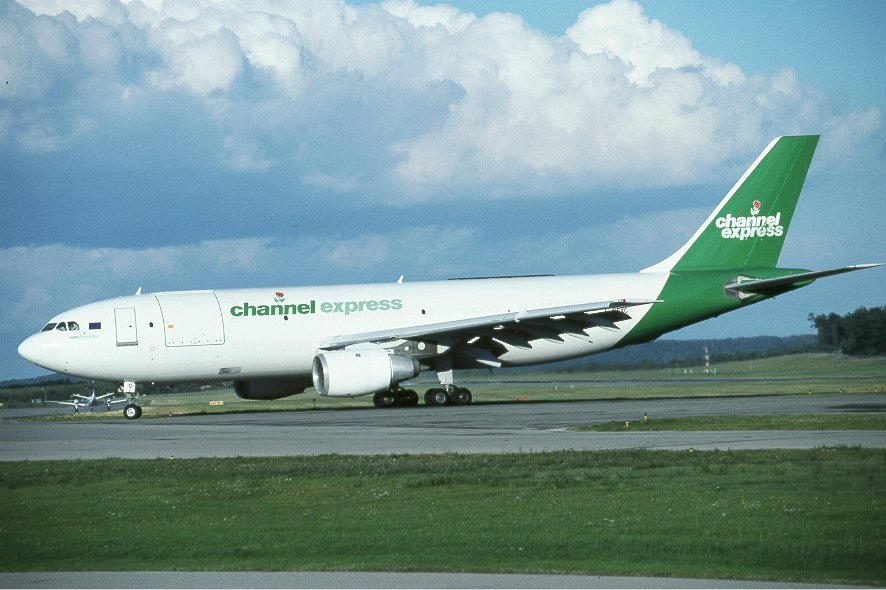
- Airbus A300
IATA	ICAO	Call sign
LS	EXS	CHANNEX
- Founded: 1975 (as Express Air Freight)
- Commenced operations: 1983 (as Channel Express)
- Ceased operations: January 2006 (assets merged into Jet2.com)
- Operating bases: Bournemouth Airport
- Parent company: Channel Express Group (1983–1991); Dart Group plc (1991–2006)
- Headquarters: Christchurch, Dorset
- Website: channel-express.co.uk

Channel Express (Air Services) Limited was an airline with its head office in Building 470 at Bournemouth Airport in Christchurch, Dorset, near Bournemouth. It operated scheduled services from Bournemouth to the Channel Islands and nightly cargo services to Europe and throughout the UK on behalf of Royal Mail and other overnight express carriers. Short notice and ad hoc charters were also operated throughout Europe, the Middle East and North Africa, as well as wet-lease operations on behalf of major scheduled airlines. Its main base was Bournemouth International Airport (BOH). In early January 2006 Channel Express stopped operating, and the company entirely merged assets to become Jet2.com, a successful low-cost airline which was already its subsidiary.

== History ==
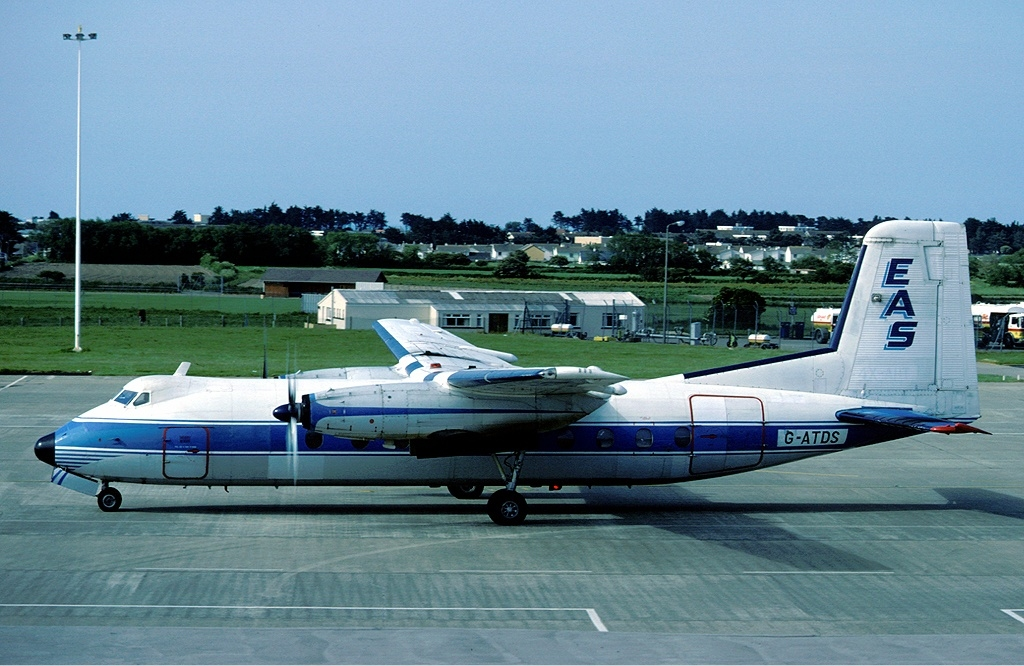
Handley Page Dart Herald

From Carpenter Air Services to Express Air Services (C.I.)

In 1971 Guernsey's flower and vegetable growers combined with Art Carpenter to form Carpenter Air Services for the purposes of flying fresh flowers and produce to the mainland. Initially, two DC 3s were chartered to operate into Bournemouth-Hurn and East Midlands airports. In 1975 the company was renamed Express Air Freight (C.I.)Ltd. and two years later, owned by the Hunting Group through Field Aviation, it replaced the DC 3s with two second-hand Handley Page Dart Heralds. Two further Heralds were acquired early in 1978, enabling the commencement of passenger charters under the corporate name Express Air Services (C.I.) Ltd. from 17 March.

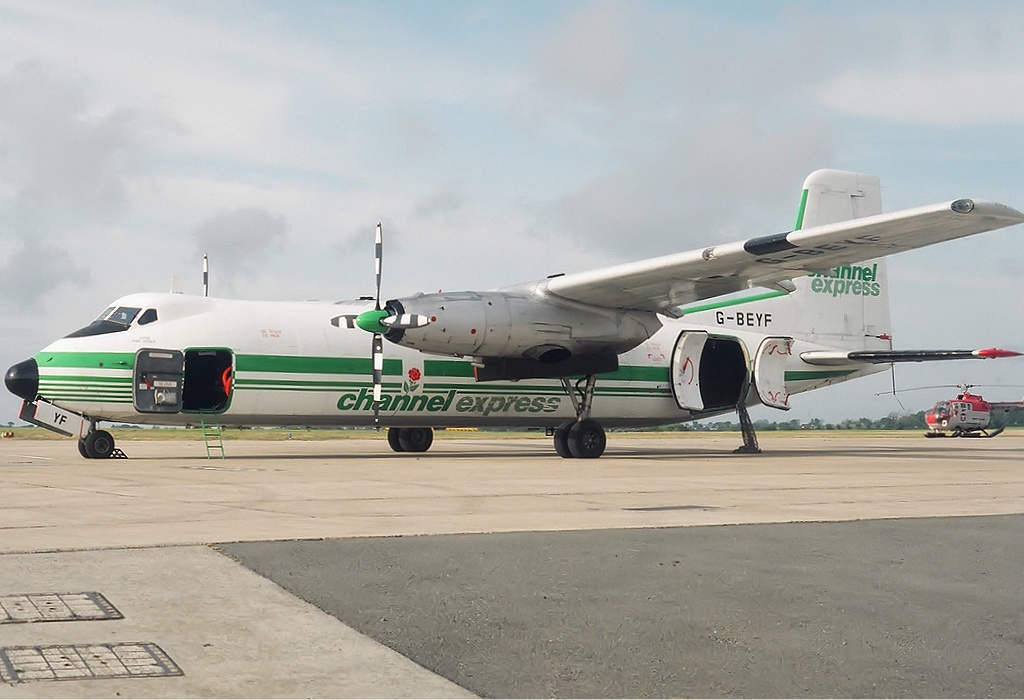
Handley Page Dart Herald

Channel Express

Major re-organisation came about in January 1979, when EAF group merged with Intra Airways to form the nucleus of Jersey European Airways. Under this arrangement, Viscount, Herald and Dakota operations were combined under EAS, while JEA operated a local-service network from the Channel Islands. This amalgamation was short-lived, for in October 1980 EAF was de-merged, taking with it the four-strong Herald fleet and two DC 3s, although these latter were sold in early 1982. The airline and its associate companies again changed hands in 1983, when it was acquired by the Philip Meeson Group, whence adoption of Channel Express name marked the beginnings of measured expansion. With new contracts for the Royal Mail/Datapost, Guernsey Post Office and major newspapers the Herald fleet was gradually expanded to peak at nine aircraft by 1990.

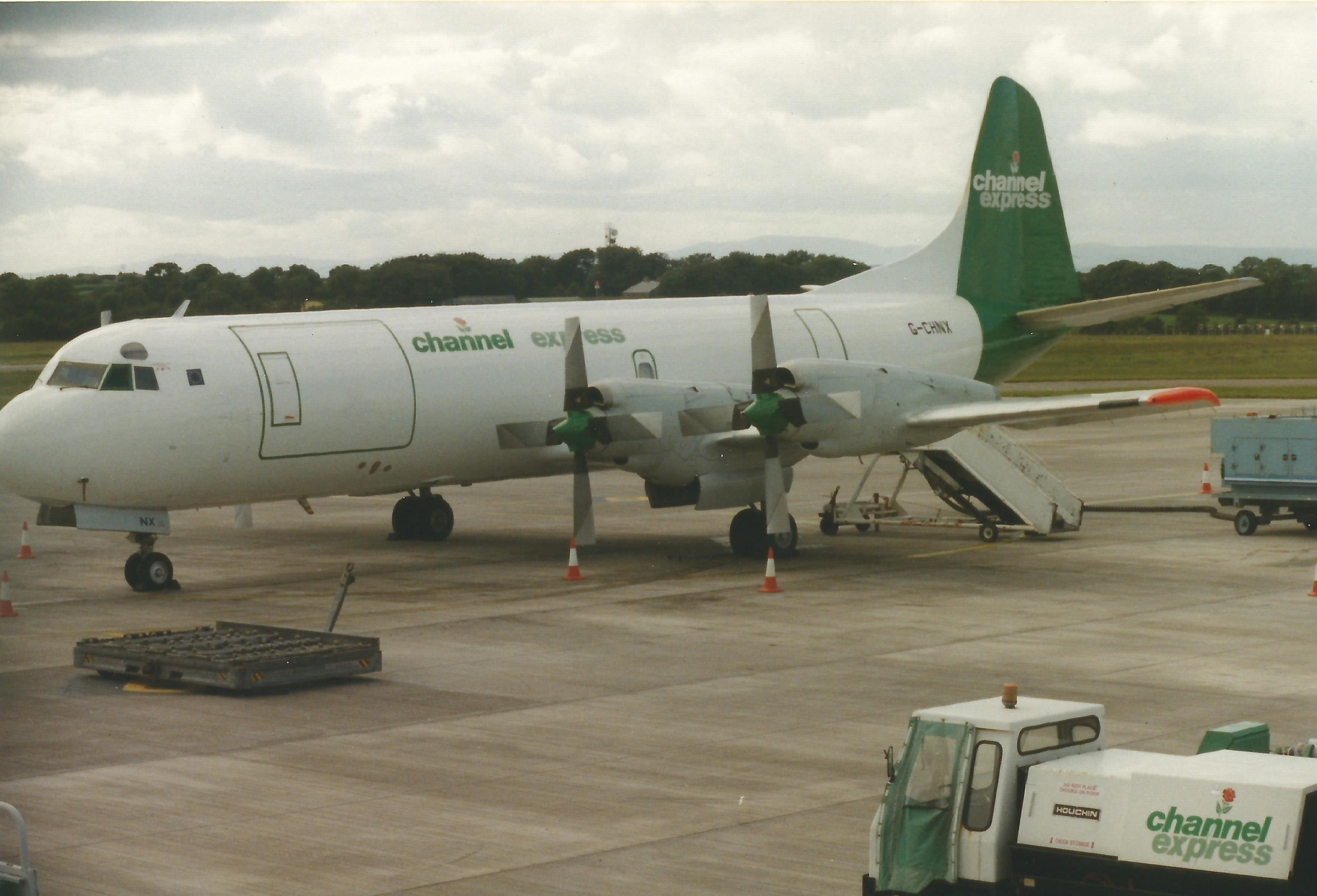
Lockheed L-188 ElectraF at Cork airport in July 1999

Having already sampled the benefits of a recently arrived Lockheed L.188 Electra freighter in March 1989, the air carrier decided to purchase its own example. The first aircraft was delivered late in November 1989, ultimately for use on the high-density Channel Islands run, more than doubling the capacity of a single Herald. Later it undertook services for UPS between Southend and Cologne.

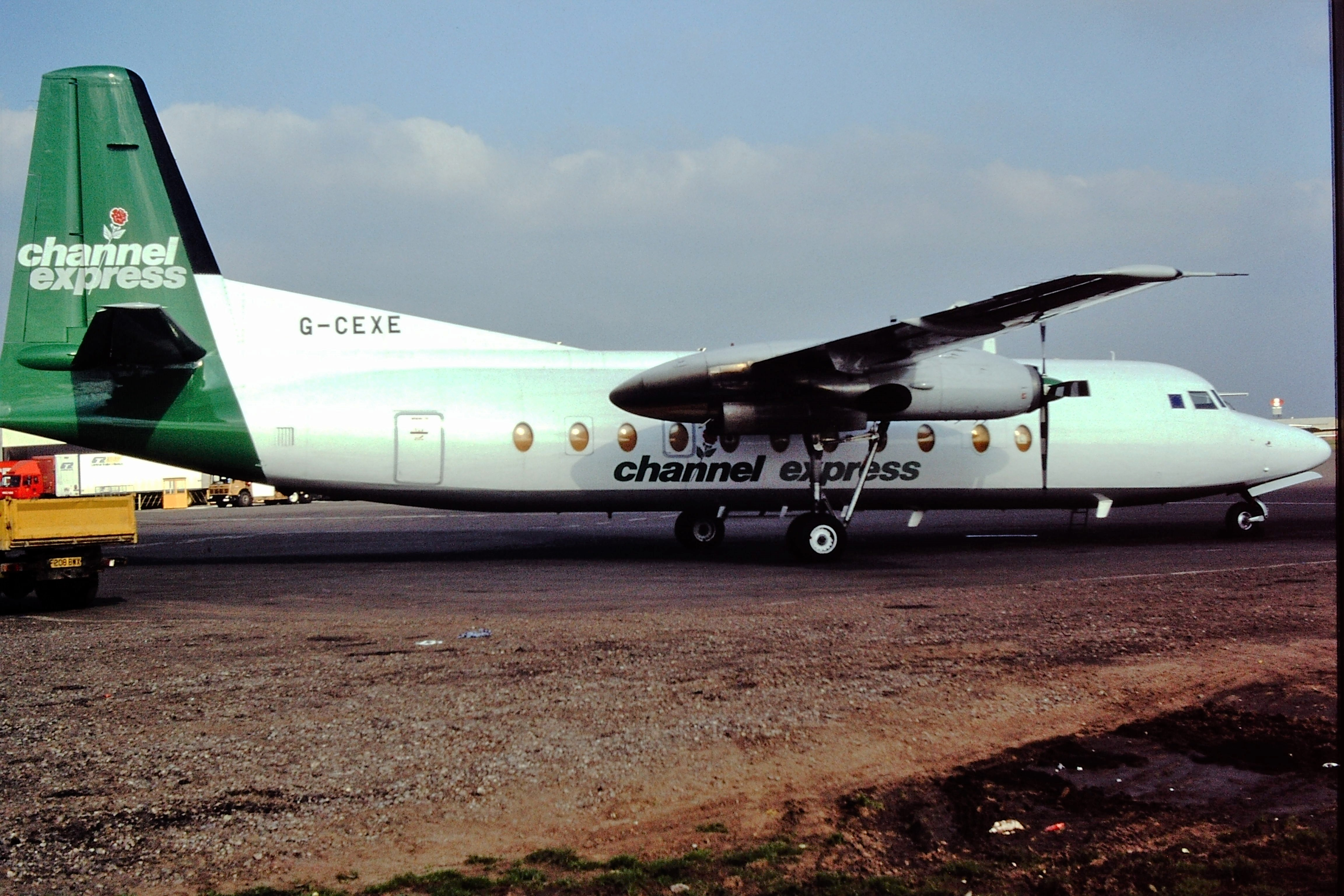
Fokker F27

The extra capacity requirements of competitors saw the operation of a dedicated Fokker F27 Friendship in January 1990 to take over the nightly Brussels connection. The addition of two more Electras by the autumn of 1991 saw all three largely devoted to UPS services, now extended to Helsinki, Stockholm and Bergamo. A parallel Herald service connected UPS facilities at Shannon and Paris (Orly). Under the Royal Mail guise, the L.188F first appeared on the new Stansted-Edinburgh route from the summer of 1992, anticipated to carry up to 43m letters annually.

From 1994, Channel express began amassing a fleet of F 27s with a view to eventual retirement of ageing Heralds, the last of which made her final flight from Liverpool to Bournemouth in the early hours of April 9, 1999, ending 22 years of continuous operation. Having relied solely on propeller-driven aircraft since its inception, the air carrier now began seeking jet equipment. Accordingly, in 1996 an Airbus A300B4 was obtained and converted to 45-tons freighter configuration. It entered service in July 1997 on weekday Sweden-Luxembourg flights, augmented by Stansted-Tel Aviv at weekends. During the next eighteen months, four further A300s were commissioned and eventually three were placed on prime express parcels runs for TNT and, subsequently the long-haul Stansted-Cologne-Dubai route on behalf of UPS.

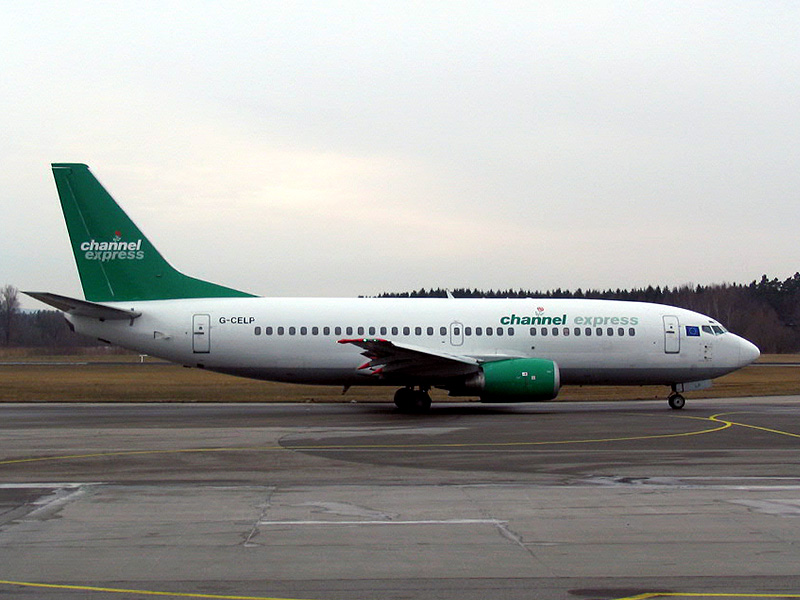
Channel Express Boeing 737 serie 300 in Friedrichshafen

Looking towards entering the VIP/incentive and IT/ airline sub-charter markets, in 2001 two 'quick-change' Boeing 737s were wet-leased. With their 17-tons freight capacity they also proved ideal for larger volume mail routes such as Stansted-Edinburgh. In October 2002 the Dart Group (new parent name from 1991) began an LCC passenger operation under the title, jet2.com with several B737s. Ultimately, all Dart Group aviation activities were harmonised under jet2 name, as of January 2006 and, operationally, from the following month of February.

== Fleet ==
As of 2005 the Channel Express fleet was made up of:

- 6 x Airbus A300
- 9 x Boeing 737
- 11 x Fokker F27
- 13 x Handley Page Dart Herald
- 5 x Lockheed L-188 Electra

== Destinations ==
Belgium

- Brussels - Brussels Airport

Czech Republic

- Prague - Prague Ruzyně International Airport

Denmark

- Copenhagen - Copenhagen Airport

Finland

- Helsinki - Helsinki Airport

France

- Nice - Nice Côte d'Azur Airport
- Paris - Charles de Gaulle Airport
- Toulouse - Toulouse–Blagnac Airport

Germany

- Cologne - Cologne/Bonn Airport

Guernsey

- Guernsey - Guernsey Airport

Ireland

- Dublin - Dublin Airport
- Waterford - Waterford Airport

Italy

- Milan - Milan Malpensa Airport
- Naples - Naples International Airport
- Rome - Leonardo da Vinci–Fiumicino Airport

Jersey

- Jersey - Jersey Airport

Kosovo

- Pristina - Pristina International Airport Adem Jashari

Malta

- Luqa - Malta International Airport

Netherlands

- Amsterdam - Amsterdam Airport Schiphol

Poland

- Warsaw - Warsaw Chopin Airport

Portugal

- Funchal - Cristiano Ronaldo International Airport
- Lisbon - Lisbon Airport

Spain

- Barcelona - Josep Tarradellas Barcelona–El Prat Airport
- Palma de Mallorca - Palma de Mallorca Airport
- Murcia - Murcia–San Javier Airport

United Kingdom

- Aberdeen - Aberdeen Airport
- Bournemouth - Bournemouth Airport
- Nottingham - East Midlands Airport
- Edinburgh - Edinburgh Airport
- London - Gatwick Airport
- London - London Stansted Airport
- Manchester - Manchester Airport

== Accidents and incidents ==
12 January 1999 – a Channel Express Fokker F-27 Mk 500 G-CHNL stalled and crashed on approach to Guernsey Airport, Channel Islands. Both crew were killed. Two houses were destroyed by fire and one person on the ground was injured.

== See also ==
- List of defunct airlines of the United Kingdom
