= List of Jet2.com destinations =

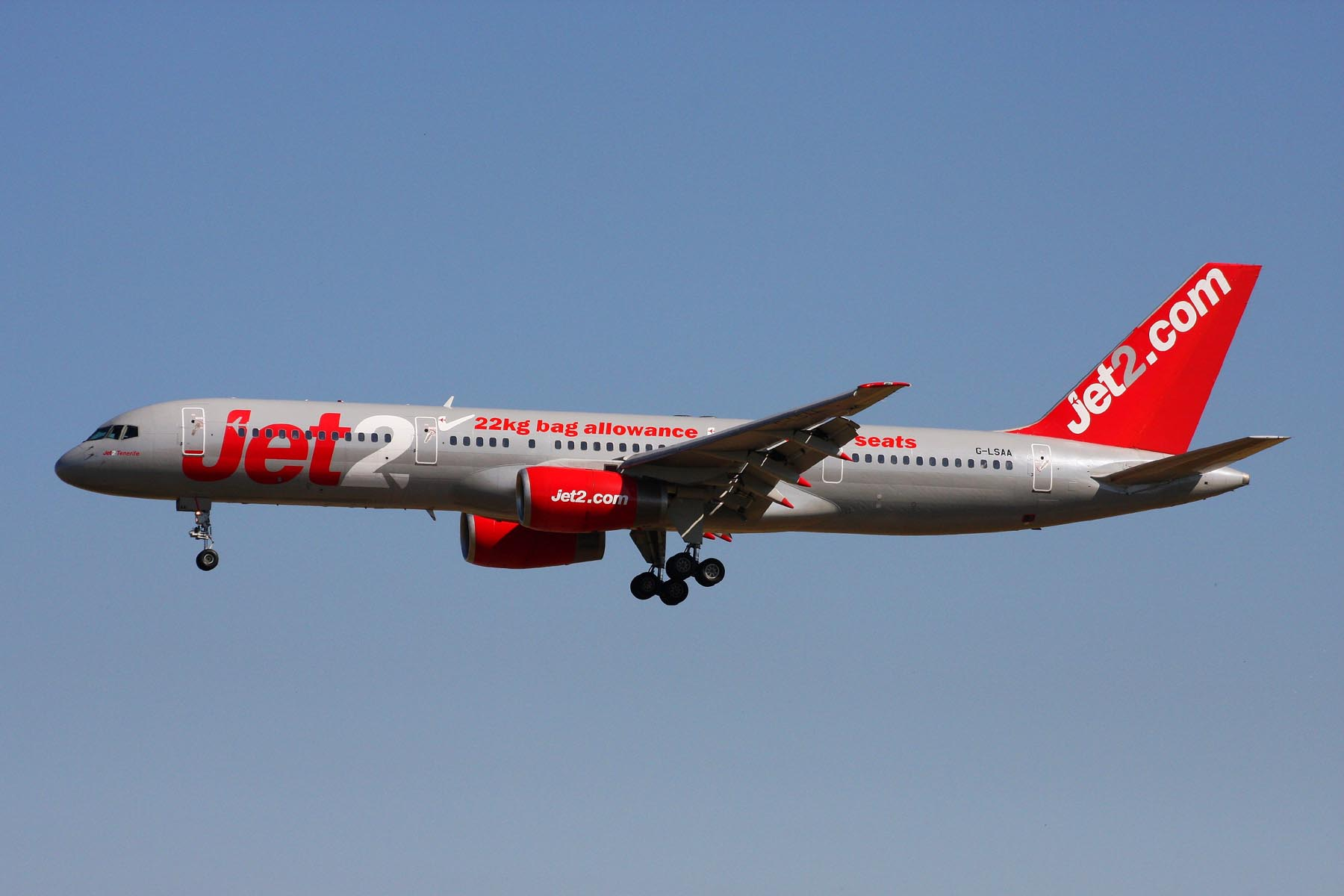
A former Jet2.com Boeing 757-200

As of June 2026, Jet2.com operates to the following destinations:

== List ==
Country	Town	Airport	Notes	Refs
Austria	Innsbruck	Innsbruck Airport	Seasonal	
Austria	Salzburg	Salzburg Airport	Seasonal	
Austria	Vienna	Vienna International Airport	Seasonal	
Bulgaria	Burgas	Burgas Airport	Seasonal	
Bulgaria	Plovdiv	Plovdiv Airport	Seasonal charter	
Bulgaria	Sofia	Vasil Levski Sofia Airport	Terminated	
Croatia	Dubrovnik	Dubrovnik Airport	Seasonal	
Croatia	Pula	Pula Airport	Seasonal	
Croatia	Split	Split Airport	Seasonal	
Croatia	Zadar	Zadar Airport	Terminated	
Cyprus	Larnaca	Larnaca International Airport	Seasonal	
Cyprus	Paphos	Paphos International Airport		
Czech Republic	Prague	Václav Havel Airport Prague		
Denmark	Copenhagen	Copenhagen Airport	Seasonal	
Egypt	Hurghada	Hurghada International Airport	Restarts 11 February 2027	
Egypt	Sharm El Sheikh	Sharm El Sheikh International Airport	Restarts 11 February 2027	
Estonia	Tallinn	Lennart Meri Tallinn Airport	Seasonal	
Finland	Enontekiö	Enontekiö Airport	Seasonal charter	
Finland	Ivalo	Ivalo Airport	Seasonal charter	
Finland	Kittilä	Kittilä Airport	Seasonal charter	
Finland	Kuusamo	Kuusamo Airport	Seasonal charter	
Finland	Rovaniemi	Rovaniemi Airport	Seasonal charter	
France	Bergerac	Bergerac Dordogne Périgord Airport	Seasonal	
France	Chambéry	Chambéry Airport	Seasonal	
France	Grenoble	Alpes–Isère Airport	Seasonal	
France	La Rochelle	La Rochelle–Île de Ré Airport	Begins 22 May 2027	
France	Lyon	Lyon–Saint-Exupéry Airport	Seasonal	
France	Nice	Nice Côte d'Azur Airport	Seasonal	
France	Paris	Charles de Gaulle Airport		
France	Perpignan	Perpignan Airport	Begins 2 May 2027	
France	Strasbourg	Strasbourg Airport	Seasonal	
France	Toulouse	Toulouse–Blagnac Airport	Terminated	
Gambia	Banjul	Banjul International Airport	Seasonal charter	
Germany	Berlin	Berlin Brandenburg Airport	Seasonal	
Germany	Berlin	Berlin Schönefeld Airport	Airport closed	
Germany	Cologne	Cologne Bonn Airport	Seasonal	
Greece	Athens	Athens International Airport		
Greece	Chania	Chania International Airport	Seasonal	
Greece	Corfu	Corfu International Airport	Seasonal	
Greece	Heraklion	Heraklion International Airport	Seasonal	
Greece	Kalamata	Kalamata International Airport	Seasonal	
Greece	Kavala	Kavala Airport	Begins 11 May 2027	
Greece	Kefalonia	Kefalonia International Airport	Seasonal	
Greece	Kos	Kos International Airport	Seasonal	
Greece	Lesvos	Mytilene International Airport	Seasonal	
Greece	Mykonos	Mykonos Airport	Terminated	
Greece	Preveza	Aktion National Airport	Seasonal	
Greece	Rhodes	Rhodes International Airport	Seasonal	
Greece	Samos	Samos Airport	Seasonal	
Greece	Santorini	Santorini International Airport	Seasonal	
Greece	Skiathos	Skiathos International Airport	Seasonal	
Greece	Thessaloniki	Thessaloniki Airport	Seasonal	
Greece	Zakynthos	Zakynthos International Airport	Seasonal	
Hungary	Budapest	Budapest Ferenc Liszt International Airport		
Iceland	Reykjavík	Keflavík International Airport	Seasonal	
Israel	Tel Aviv	David Ben Gurion Airport	Terminated	
Italy	Catania	Catania–Fontanarossa Airport	Seasonal	
Italy	Milan	Milan Bergamo Airport	Terminated	
Italy	Naples	Naples International Airport	Seasonal	
Italy	Olbia	Olbia Costa Smeralda Airport		
Italy	Palermo	Palermo Airport	Seasonal	
Italy	Pisa	Pisa International Airport	Seasonal	
Italy	Rimini	Rimini Airport	Terminated	
Italy	Rome	Rome Fiumicino Airport		
Italy	Turin	Turin Airport	Seasonal	
Italy	Venice	Venice Marco Polo Airport	Seasonal	
Italy	Verona	Verona Villafranca Airport	Seasonal	
Jersey	Jersey	Jersey Airport	Seasonal	
Malta	Luqa	Malta International Airport		
Montenegro	Tivat	Tivat Airport	Seasonal	
Morocco	Agadir	Agadir–Al Massira Airport		
Morocco	Marrakesh	Marrakesh Menara Airport		
Netherlands	Amsterdam	Amsterdam Airport Schiphol	Terminated	
Norway	Bergen	Bergen Flesland Airport	Seasonal	
Poland	Gdańsk	Gdańsk Lech Wałęsa Airport	Seasonal	
Poland	Kraków	Kraków John Paul II International Airport		
Portugal	Faro	Faro Airport		
Portugal	Lisbon	Lisbon Airport	Terminated	
Portugal	Madeira	Madeira Airport		
Portugal	Porto	Porto Airport	Seasonal	
Spain	Alicante	Alicante–Elche Miguel Hernández Airport	Base	
Spain	Almeria	Almería Airport	Seasonal	
Spain	Barcelona	Josep Tarradellas Barcelona–El Prat Airport		
Spain	Fuerteventura	Fuerteventura Airport		
Spain	Girona	Girona–Costa Brava Airport	Seasonal	
Spain	Gran Canaria	Gran Canaria Airport		
Spain	Ibiza	Ibiza Airport	Seasonal	
Spain	Jerez de la Frontera	Jerez Airport	Seasonal	
Spain	La Palma	La Palma Airport	Terminated	
Spain	Lanzarote	Lanzarote Airport		
Spain	Mallorca	Palma de Mallorca Airport	Base	
Spain	Málaga	Málaga Airport		
Spain	Menorca	Menorca Airport	Seasonal	
Spain	Murcia	Murcia–San Javier Airport	Airport closed	
Spain	Murcia	Región de Murcia International Airport	Terminated	
Spain	Reus	Reus Airport	Seasonal	
Spain	Tenerife	Tenerife South Airport		
Spain	Valencia	Valencia Airport	Terminated	
Switzerland	Geneva	Geneva Airport	Seasonal	
Tunisia	Enfidha	Enfidha–Hammamet International Airport	Restarts 1 May 2027	
Tunisia	Monastir	Monastir Habib Bourguiba International Airport	Terminated	
Turkey	Antalya	Antalya Airport		
Turkey	Bodrum	Milas–Bodrum Airport	Seasonal	
Turkey	Dalaman	Dalaman Airport	Seasonal	
Turkey	İzmir	İzmir Adnan Menderes Airport	Seasonal	
United Kingdom	Belfast	Belfast International Airport	Base	
United Kingdom	Birmingham	Birmingham Airport	Base	
United Kingdom	Blackpool	Blackpool Airport	Airport closed	
United Kingdom	Bristol	Bristol Airport	Base	
United Kingdom	Bournemouth	Bournemouth Airport	Base	
United Kingdom	East Midlands	East Midlands Airport	Base	
United Kingdom	Edinburgh	Edinburgh Airport	Base	
United Kingdom	Glasgow	Glasgow Airport	Base	
United Kingdom	Leeds/Bradford	Leeds Bradford Airport	Base	
United Kingdom	Liverpool	Liverpool John Lennon Airport	Base	
United Kingdom	London	London Gatwick Airport	Base	
United Kingdom	London	London Luton Airport	Base	
United Kingdom	London	London Stansted Airport	Base	
United Kingdom	Manchester	Manchester Airport	Base	
United Kingdom	Newcastle upon Tyne	Newcastle International Airport	Base	
United States	Boston	Logan International Airport	Terminated	
United States	New York City	Newark Liberty International Airport	Terminated	

== See also ==
- Jet2.com
- Transport in the United Kingdom
