= Jet2 plc =

British multinational airline company

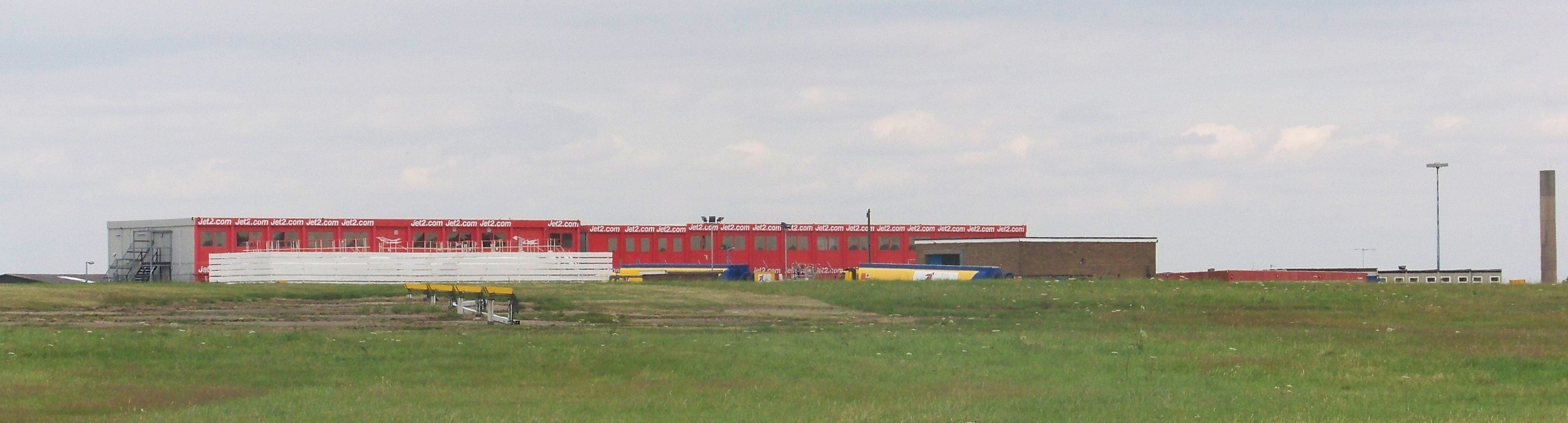
- Jet2.com headquarters
- Formerly: Carpenter's (1971–1975); Express Air Freight (1975–1983); Channel Express (1983–1991); Dart Group plc (1991–2020)
- Type: Public
- Traded as: AIM: JET2
- Founded: 1971; 55 years ago
- Founder: Art Carpenter
- Headquarters: Leeds Bradford Airport, Yorkshire, England
- Area served: Europe
- Key people: Steve Heapy (CEO)
- Products: Charter and scheduled passenger airlines, package holidays, cruise lines, hotels and resorts
- Revenue: ▲£5,003.5 million (2023)
- Operating income: ▲£394.0 million (2023)
- Net income: ▲£290.8 million (2023)
- Total assets: ▲£3.38 billion (2020)
- Total equity: ▲£634.10 million (2020)
- Subsidiaries: Jet2.com; Jet2holidays
- Website: www.jet2plc.com

Jet2 plc (formerly Dart Group plc) is a British multinational airline company based near Leeds in Yorkshire. It owns the large low-cost airline Jet2.com and the package holiday company Jet2holidays.

Its head office is listed as Low Fare Finder House on the grounds of Leeds Bradford Airport, England. Subsidiary Jet2.com has its head office in the same building. The commercial operations for the company are based at Holiday House, an office building in Leeds' city centre.

The company's name for most of its existence was derived from the type of aircraft that it first flew, the Handley Page Dart Herald. After selling off other units, the company rebranded as Jet2 in 2020. The stock ticker symbol also changed to Jet2 to reflect the name change.

== History ==
Dart Group logo used until 2020.

=== Leased aircraft ===
The company's operations originated in 1971 when Art Carpenter formed two companies: Carpenter's Air Services Ltd to fly flowers using contracted aircraft to the UK mainland from Guernsey; and Carpenter's Transport to distribute the flowers on the UK mainland to wholesale markets. In 1975, these two companies became Express Air Freight.

=== Purchase of aircraft ===
In 1978, the company purchased Handley Page Dart Herald aircraft to fly flowers and fresh produce from the Channel Islands to Bournemouth Airport, and consumer goods from the UK via Bournemouth to the Channel Islands. In 1979, it became Express Air Services and flew contracts for the Royal Mail to the Channel Islands from Bournemouth, Bristol and Liverpool from 1980.

=== Purchase by Philip Meeson ===
In 1983, the company changed its name to identify with its regional route, becoming three companies under the Channel Express name, which had the air freight, running of the two Dart Herald aircraft, and the distribution within the UK as separate operations. It was purchased in 1983 by Philip Meeson, becoming Channel Express Group. It was split into Aviation Services and Distribution divisions. In 1985, a third Dart Herald aircraft was bought, which flew an overnight parcels service from Birmingham Airport to Nuremberg and Hanover.

=== Flotation ===
Channel Express Group Ltd floated on the UK's Unlisted Securities Market (USM) and had seven Super Dart Herald aircraft. In 1989, it bought the first of three Lockheed Electra aircraft, as well as having nine Super Dart Herald aircraft. In 1991, the company changed its name to Dart Group plc and floated on the London Stock Exchange.

=== Fowler Welch ===
In 1994, it purchased the Spalding-based company Fowler Welch, a temperature-controlled distribution company. The first of seven Fokker F27 aircraft was purchased in 1994. Its airline group, Channel Express (Air Services), bought its first 257-seater Airbus A-300B4 in 1996. It was converted to become a freighter at BAE Systems in Filton. A southern distribution centre was built in Portsmouth in 1999 under the Channel Express name. The Coolchain distribution company in Kent was bought in 1999. By 2000 the company had 1,500 employees and two divisions (air and freight distribution). In 2001, two Boeing 737 aircraft were purchased with a quick-change facility allowing a freight aircraft to transform into a passenger aircraft in only 30 minutes.

On 1 June 2020 it was confirmed that Dart Group PLC had sold Fowler Welch for £98 million to Culina Group Limited.

=== Jet2.com ===
In 2002, four Boeing 737 aircraft were purchased with two becoming 737 QC (quick change) aircraft and two as passenger aircraft. From February 2003, the Jet2 low-cost airline began flying from Leeds Bradford Airport to mainland Europe destinations. Fowler-Welch and Coolchain merged to become Fowler-Welch Coolchain Ltd in 2003. Eight Boeing 737-300 aircraft (of which five were passenger aircraft) were purchased in 2003 to bring the total to 12. In 2004, six more Boeing 737-300 passenger aircraft were purchased, and routes from Belfast International Airport started in April and from Manchester Airport in December. In 2005, routes began from Newcastle Airport in October and two Boeing 757-200 aircraft were purchased. In 2006, six more Boeing 757-200 passenger aircraft were bought and the Channel Express Portsmouth distribution base was sold to Ferryspeed C.I. Ltd in June. A package holiday company, Jet2holidays, was formed in January 2007.

== Corporate Affairs ==
Below is the financial information of Jet2 plc and its predecessor Dart Group plc:

Year	Revenue	Net Income
2002/03	£197.46 million	£7.41 million
2003/04	▲£228.2 million	▼£5.65 million
2004/05	▲£267.99 million	▼£5.61 million
2005/06	▲£310.1 million	▲£11.2 million
2006/07	▲£349 million	▲£13.6 million
2007-08	▲£429.3 million	▼£8.7 million
2008-09	▲£439.3 million	▲£27.1 million
2009-10	▼£434.5 million	▼£15.6 million
2010-11	▲£542.9 million	▲£17.3 million
2011-12	▲£683 million	▲£22.7 million
2012-13	▲£869.2 million	▲£31.2 million
2013-14	▲£1.12 billion	▲£35.9 million
2014-15	▲£1.25 billion	▼£32.8 million
2015-16	▲£1.4 billion	▲£88.8 million
2016-17	▲£1.72 billion	▼£76.7 million
2017-18	▲£2.22 billion	▲£108.9 million
2018-19	▲£3.14 billion	▲£145.6 million
2019-20	▲£3.58 billion	▼£116 million
2020-21	▼£395.4 million	▼£(271.2) million
2021-22	▲£1.23 billion	▼£(315.4) million
2022-23	▲£5.03 billion	▲£290.8 million

== Operations ==
The company has the Jet2.com low cost airline that has its headquarters on the grounds of Leeds Bradford Airport, along with its subsidiary Jet2holidays. The airline operates from 13 UK bases, such as Leeds Bradford Airport, Newcastle International Airport, Edinburgh Airport, Manchester Airport, Glasgow Airport, Belfast International Airport, East Midlands Airport, Birmingham Airport, London Stansted Airport, Bristol Airport, Liverpool Airport, Bournemouth Airport, London Luton Airport. They also have 3 overseas bases, Alicante Airport, Palma de Mallorca Airport and Tenerife South Airport. In March 2024, Jet2.com launched operations from Liverpool John Lennon Airport.

== In popular culture ==
In the summer of 2025, Jet2 plc parent company, Jet2holidays long-running marketing campaign, "Hold My Hand", became a popular meme on TikTok, often showing a compilation of comedic and/or strange visuals. The marketing campaign, voiced by British actress Zoë Lister and famous for using the Jess Glynne song "Hold My Hand", has been in use since 2015, and gained international popularity on social media apps a decade later.

== See also ==
- Jet2.com destinations
