= Peter Rigby =

British entrepreneur (born 1943)

Sir Peter Rigby
- Born: September 29, 1943 (age 83); Liverpool, United Kingdom
- Occupation: Businessman
- Known for: Chair of Rigby Group
- Children: 2 including James Rigby

Sir Peter Rigby DL (born 29 September 1943) is a British entrepreneur. He is chairman of Rigby Group PLC, and is one of Britain's richest people.

== Early life ==
Rigby was born in 1943 in Liverpool and went to a local grammar school. He learned to fly at 15 and wanted a career in the Royal Air Force but the health of his father meant he instead took a graduate position with National Cash Register Company in their electronic processing division. There he learned to program and design computer systems.

== Career ==
=== Specialist Computer Centres ===
Peter Rigby founded SCC (Specialist Computer Centres) in 1975 with an initial cash investment of just £2,000. Rigby has maintained control of the company over 40 years of sustained growth and has seen SCC's turnover rise to £2.038 billion (2005).

In May 2012, a company press release claimed that turnover to year end March 2012, had risen to £2.75billion, a 10% rise on the previous yearly period. Peter Rigby claims that if SCC were a public company, turnover would be as much as £14 billion.

SCC is now the largest privately owned technology company in Europe.

His sons, James Rigby and Steven Rigby serve as co-CEOs, while Peter Rigby is chairman.

=== Other activities ===
In April 2010 Rigby's Patriot Aviation Group bought Coventry Airport, with a view to moving from freight-only to serving business passengers and helicopters. In June 2013 it bought Exeter International Airport. In June 2014 it bought Norwich International Airport, and in December 2017, Bournemouth Airport.

Rigby also owns the luxury hotel group Eden Hotel Collection, of which Mallory Court in Leamington was named "Most Excellent Hotel in the United Kingdom and Ireland" for 2009 by magazine Condé Nast Johansens.

== Wealth ==
In 2010, the Sunday Times Rich List estimates Rigby to be worth £430m, based on his corporate investments. This ranked him as the 158th richest person in Britain. Although his net worth has increased through the acquisition of European IT companies, his position on the rich list has slipped from a peak of 61st in 2003.

The Birmingham Post also publishes a rich list of residents of the West Midlands; Rigby was at number 11 in 2017 with an estimated net worth of £850 million.

In 2024 he donated £50,000 to the Conservatives.

== Honours ==
In 2000 Rigby was appointed Deputy Lieutenant of the West Midlands. He was knighted in the 2002 Birthday Honours "for services to information technology and to business in the West Midlands".

2021 : Knight of the Légion d'Honneur in France.
