= Bergerac Dordogne Périgord Airport =

Airport in south-west France

Bergerac Dordogne Périgord Airport Aéroport de Bergerac Dordogne Périgord
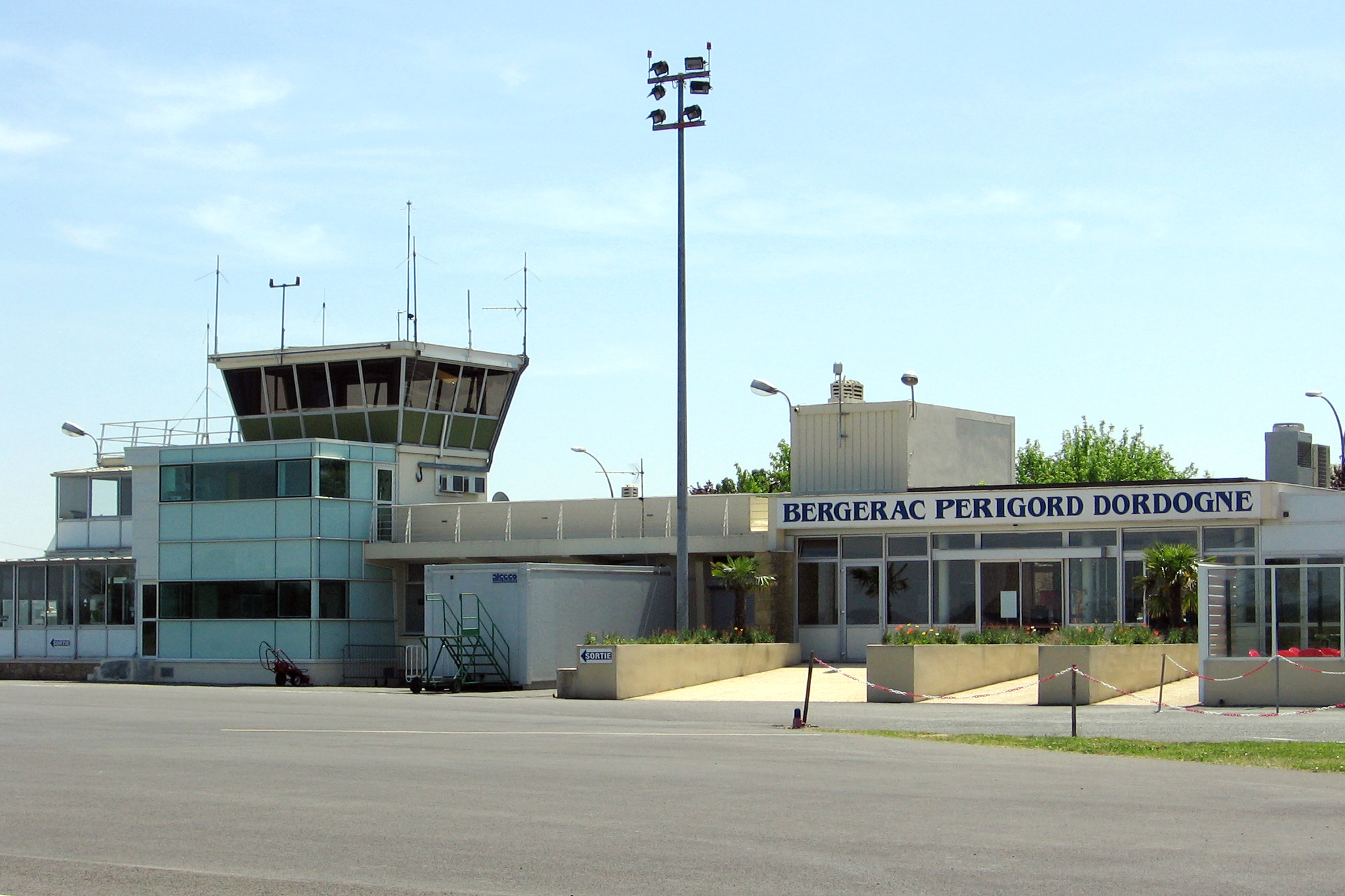
- IATA: EGC; ICAO: LFBE

Summary
- Airport type: Private, seasonal public
- Operator: CCI de Dordogne
- Serves: Bergerac, Dordogne, France
- Elevation AMSL: 171 ft / 52 m
- Coordinates: 44°49′28″N 00°31′14″E
- Website: www.bergerac.aeroport.fr

Map
- Location of airport in Nouvelle-Aquitaine region LFBE (France)

Runways
| Direction | Length | | Surface |
| Direction | m | ft | Surface |
|---|---|---|---|
| 10/28 | 2,205 | 7,324 | Asphalt |
| 10R/28L | 770 | 2,526 | Grass |

Statistics (2014)
- Passengers: 277,312
- Passenger change 13-14: ▼3.1%
- Sources: French AIP, UAF, DAFIF

Bergerac Dordogne Périgord Airport (French: Aéroport de Bergerac Dordogne Périgord) (IATA: EGC, ICAO: LFBE) is an international airport serving Bergerac, a commune of the Dordogne department (formerly the Périgord province) in the Nouvelle-Aquitaine region of France. The airport is located 3 kilometres (1.6 NM) south-southeast of Bergerac. It is also known as Bergerac-Roumanière Airport.

== Facilities ==
The airport is situated at an elevation of 52 metres (171 ft) above mean sea level. It has one paved runway designated 10/28 which measures 2,205 by 45 metres (7,234 ft × 148 ft). It also has a parallel unpaved runway with a grass surface measuring 770 by 60 metres (2,526 ft × 197 ft).

== Airlines and destinations ==
The following airlines operate regular scheduled and charter flights at Bergerac Dordogne Périgord Airport:

| Airlines | Destinations |
|---|---|
| British Airways | Seasonal: London–City, London–Stansted |
| Jet2.com | Seasonal: Birmingham (begins 22 May 2027), Leeds/Bradford, Manchester (begins 22 May 2027) |
| Ryanair | Seasonal: Bournemouth, Bristol, East Midlands, Edinburgh, Liverpool, London–Stansted |
| Transavia | Rotterdam/The Hague |
