= Rigby Group =

English international business group

- Type: Private
- Founded: 1975
- Founder: Peter Rigby
- Headquarters: Stratford-upon-Avon, England
- Key people: Peter Rigby (Chairman); Steve Rigby, Co-Chief Executive Officer; James Rigby, Co-Chief Executive Officer
- Revenue: £2.86 billion ▲5.5% (FY20)
- Number of employees: ~8,500 (2020)
- Website: www.rigbygroupplc.com

The Rigby Group is the parent company of several privately owned businesses operating across Europe, the Middle East and North Africa.

The Rigby Group, incorporated in 1997, began its business activities in 1975. The net assets of The Rigby Group are estimated at over £500 million at the end of 2023.

In 2013 the company was ranked 13th in the Sunday Times’ Top Track 100 listing of the UK’s fastest growing private enterprises.

== History ==
The Rigby Group was founded in 1975 as Specialist Computer Recruitment, a computer recruitment company based in Birmingham.

In May 1992, Peter Rigby established the Rigby Foundation to invest in charitable causes relating to lifelong learning, health and education. Since 2024 the Rigby Foundation has focused its work on programmes that enable young people, regardless of their background, to access the best education possible and to have the chance of securing meaningful and sustainable employment.

The group’s hotel division, the Eden Hotel Collection, was founded in 1995 and currently comprises five hotels across the Midlands and South West England.

In 2006, the group launched its real estate division, Rigby & Rigby.

In 2010, the group acquired Coventry Airport after it was forced to close in 2009 due to debt.

In 2013, the group expanded its aviation division by acquiring British International Helicopters. In June 2013, the group acquired Exeter Airport from Balfour Beatty. The following week, the group announced it had also acquired Regional and City Airport Management Limited from Balfour Beatty and became responsible for the overall operation of Blackpool, City of Derry and Solent airports.

In June 2014 Norwich Airport was acquired. In September 2014, the group’s aviation division completed the acquisition of Capital Air Charter, Exeter, bringing both Capital Air Charter and Capital Air Ambulance services into the Rigby Group.

In 2017, the group acquired Helen Green Design and, in the following year, acquired Lawson Robb to bring together with their own design firm, Rigby & Rigby. Since 2018, these firms have all operated under the new Rigby Group Allect Design banner. In 2017, the group also acquired Bournemouth Airport from Manchester Airports Group.

As of 2018, the group’s financial services division consisted of three companies: FluidOne, Nuvias and Rigby Capital.

According to the 2023 Global Family Index published by EY and the University of St Gallen, The Rigby Group is one of the 500 largest family businesses globally.

In June 2024, the Rigby Group, in collaboration with Haatch and the West Midlands Co-Invest Fund, funded the ‘One to Win’ initiative, which aims to support tech start-ups in the West Midlands region. In August 2025Bournemouth and Exeter airports were sold to ICG.

The Rigby Group's headquarters are located in Stratford-upon-Avon.

== Activities ==
Allect is an international design group. It is the stable for Rigby Group’s design and delivery business. The Allect design group comprises founding member Rigby & Rigby, Helen Green Design (acquired in 2017), and Lawson Robb (acquired in 2018).
