= Jet2holidays =

British package holiday and tour operator

- Type: Subsidiary
- Traded as: Jet2holidays Limited
- Industry: Hospitality, tourism
- Founded: 2007; 19 years ago
- Headquarters: Leeds Bradford Airport, Yorkshire, England
- Area served: Europe, Turkey, Morocco
- Key people: Philip Meeson (executive chairman); Steve Heapy (CEO)
- Products: Package holidays
- Brands: Jet2CityBreaks; Jet2Villas; Indulgent Escapes; Vibe
- Parent: Jet2 plc
- Website: jet2holidays.com

Jet2holidays Limited is a British package holiday provider and tour operator based near Leeds, Yorkshire, owned by Jet2 plc. It was formed in 2007 as a subsidiary of Dart Group plc (now renamed Jet2 plc), and a sister to the airline Jet2.com, the third-largest in the UK. As of 2023, Jet2holidays is the largest tour operator in the United Kingdom, by ATOL licences in 2023.

== History ==
Jet2holidays was founded in June 2007. Upon launch, Jet2holidays provided package holidays from Jet2.com's six bases in Leeds, Manchester, Belfast, Newcastle, Blackpool and Edinburgh. It began operations at East Midlands Airport in May 2010 and announced an expansion to Glasgow Airport later that year. In 2014, Blackpool Airport closed, taking the company back down to seven bases.

By March 2015, Jet2holidays was providing package holidays to one million customers per year. The following month, it created Jet2CityBreaks, a subsidiary specialising in shorter holidays to its city destinations.

In April 2017, Jet2holidays became available from nine bases after the company announced an expansion to Birmingham Airport and London Stansted Airport. On 7 June 2017, Jet2holidays launched Jet2Villas, expanding its portfolio of self-catered package holidays. Later that month, it celebrated ten years of operation, and had sold more than seven million package holidays.

In October 2017, when Monarch Airlines ceased operations, Jet2.com and Jet2holidays added more than 650,000 seats from former Monarch airports, leading to Jet2holidays overtaking Thomas Cook Tour Operations to become the second-largest tour operator in the UK.

In November 2018, Jet2holidays successfully defended itself against four holidaymakers who falsely claimed to suffer gastric illness on a holiday in Benidorm, Spain. All four were given a three-month prison sentence suspended for two years, and fines of £750 each. In December 2018, Jet2holidays fought a false compensation claim from two holidaymakers who travelled to Marmaris, Turkey, which resulted in the couple being forced to pay the company £30,000 in damages.

In February 2023, Jet2holidays added an extra 500,000 to its operating licence making it the largest tour operator in the UK. This now means it overtakes TUI UK as it will carry 5.8 million passengers in 2023.

The company's repeated usage of Jess Glynne's "Hold My Hand" on its adverts since 2015 has attracted considerable criticism in the UK due to its longevity and for being deemed annoying. This song became an Internet meme around June 2025, where it was used to mock the company's adverts. It was also parodied by the American White House official Twitter account using the soundtrack of the Jet2 advert over footage of American Immigration agents deporting migrants, which itself received criticism.

== Operations ==
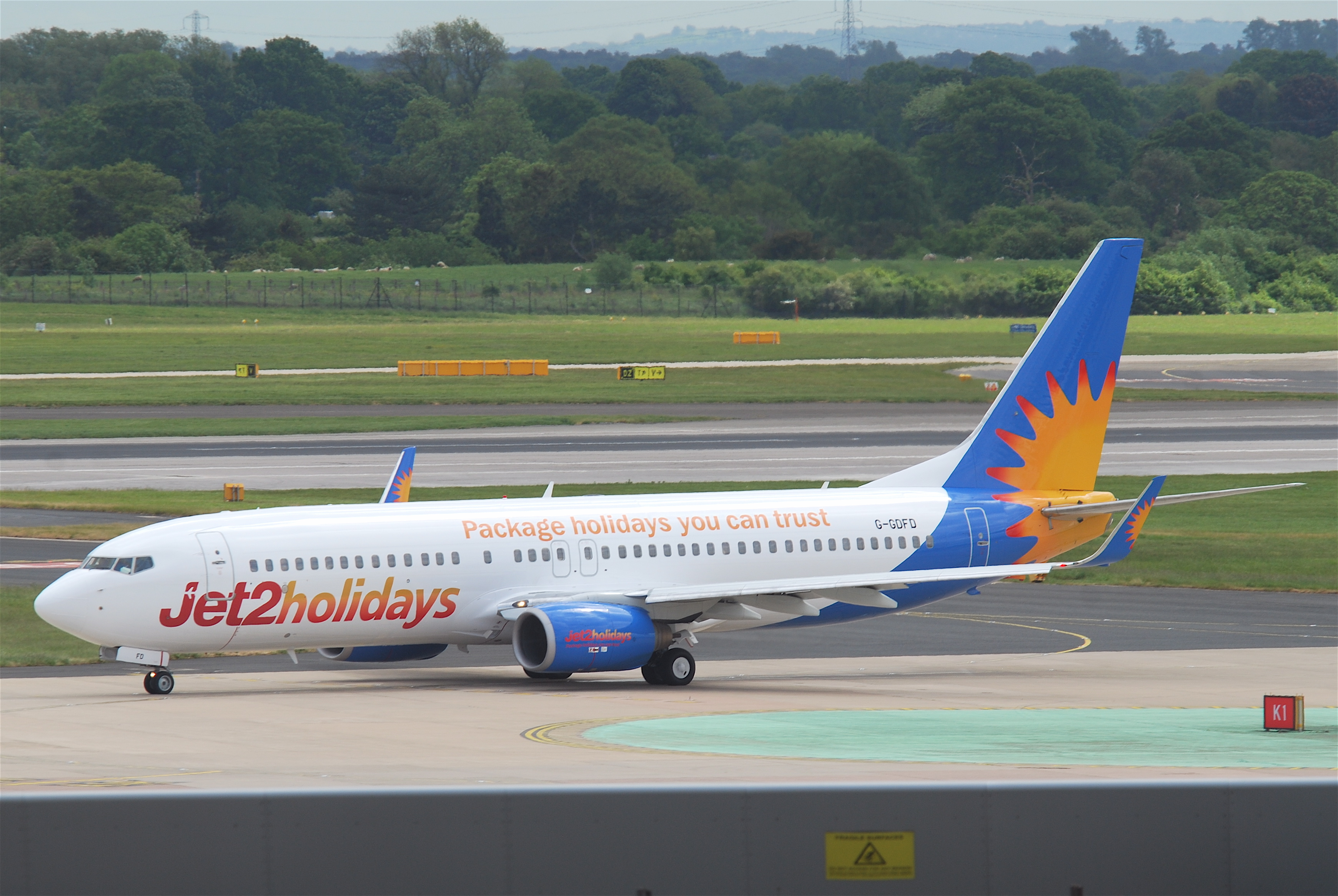
Jet2 Boeing 737-800 in the Jet2 Holidays Livery

Jet2holidays offers ABTA and ATOL-protected package holidays that comprise accommodation, transfers, baggage and return Jet2.com flights to 65 destinations, focusing on the Canary Islands, Balearic Islands, Spain, Greece, Türkiye, Morocco, and Egypt, from February 2027.

Jet2Villas provides self-catering villas and apartments across Jet2holidays destinations on a similar basis, along with car hire, while Jet2CityBreaks provides ABTA and ATOL-protected holidays with accommodation, baggage and flights to 37 destinations.

Jet2holidays sells its products through both its website and independent travel agents. In 2010, TUI Group and Thomas Cook offered Jet2holidays deals through their own travel agent networks. As Jet2holidays grew to become the third-largest tour operator in the UK, both competitors ended these arrangements in 2017.

By January 2019, Jet2holidays was partnered with 1,000 travel agents, which were accountable for 25% of its overall bookings.

In March 2026, Jet2holidays reported that its collection of certified sustainable hotels had grown from 800 to 1,500 over three years, and was targeting more than 3,000 by 2035.

== Awards ==
- 2018–2020, 2022–2025: Best Short-Haul Operator, Travel Weekly Globe Travel Awards.
- 2018, 2020 and 2022–2025: Best Trade-Friendly Brand, Travel Weekly Globe Travel Awards.
- 2018–2019: Gold Trusted Service Award, Feefo Trusted Service Awards.
- 2018, 2022–2024: Travel Brand of the Year, Which? Awards.
- 2025: Which? Recommended Provider for beach and resort holidays, family holidays, solo holidays and tailor-made holidays.
- 2021–2025: Which? Recommended Provider for city breaks (Jet2CityBreaks).
