= Flightline (airline) =

Airline based in Southend-on-Sea, Essex, England

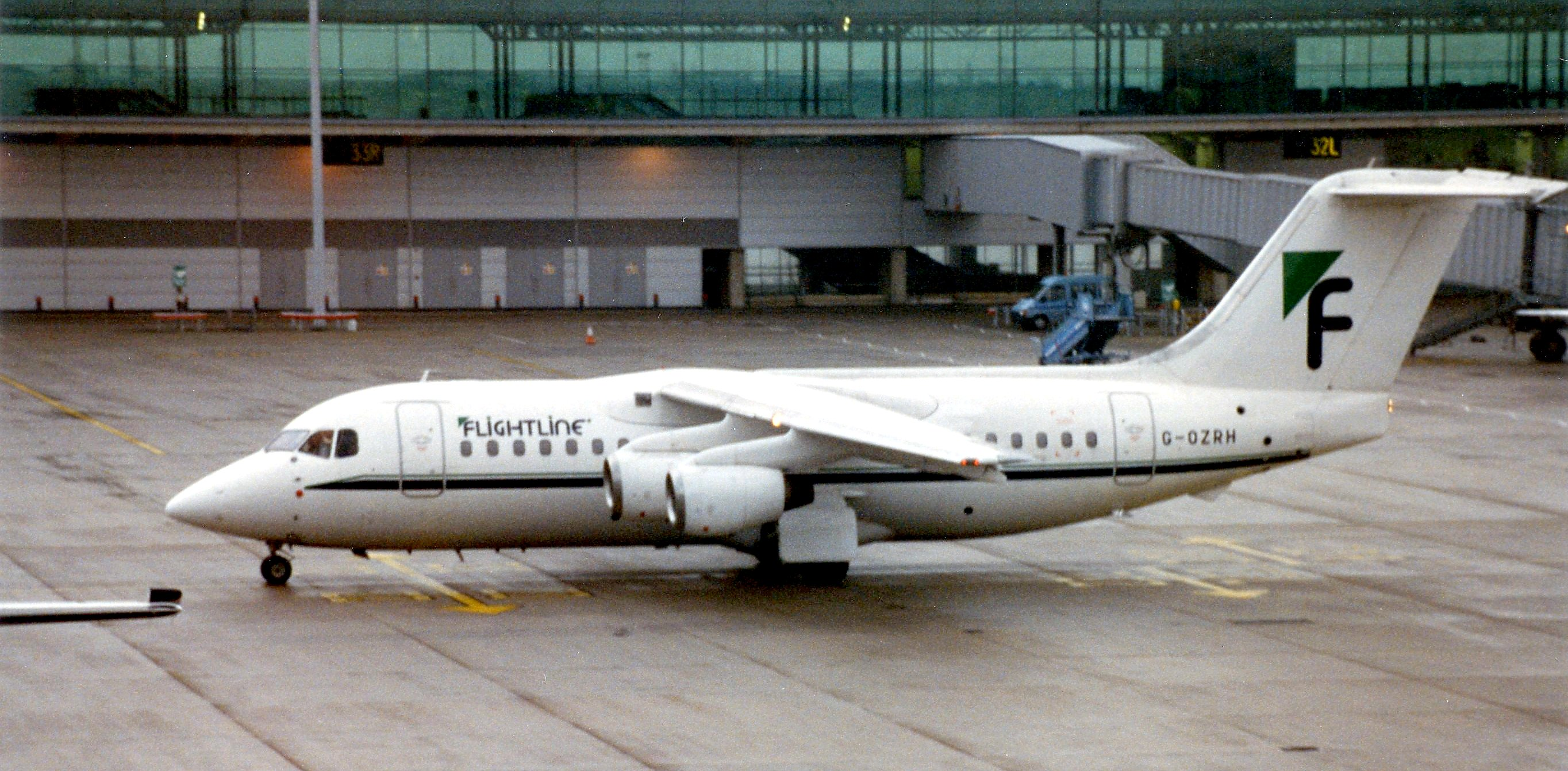
- BAe 146-200
IATA	ICAO	Call sign
B5	FLT	FLIGHTLINE
- Founded: 1989
- Commenced operations: 1993
- Ceased operations: 2 December 2008
- Hubs: London Southend Airport
- Fleet size: 11
- Destinations: 16
- Headquarters: London Southend Airport, United Kingdom
- Key people: Alan Trotter, Gareth Evans, Kevin Callan, Phil

Flightline was an airline based in Southend-on-Sea, England. It operated branded wet lease, ad hoc and contract passenger and freight charter services, as well as VIP flights and aircraft sales and maintenance. Sub-services were flown for major airlines in Europe as required. The company held a United Kingdom Civil Aviation Authority Type A Operating Licence, and was permitted to carry passengers, cargo and mail on aircraft with 20 or more seats.

== History ==
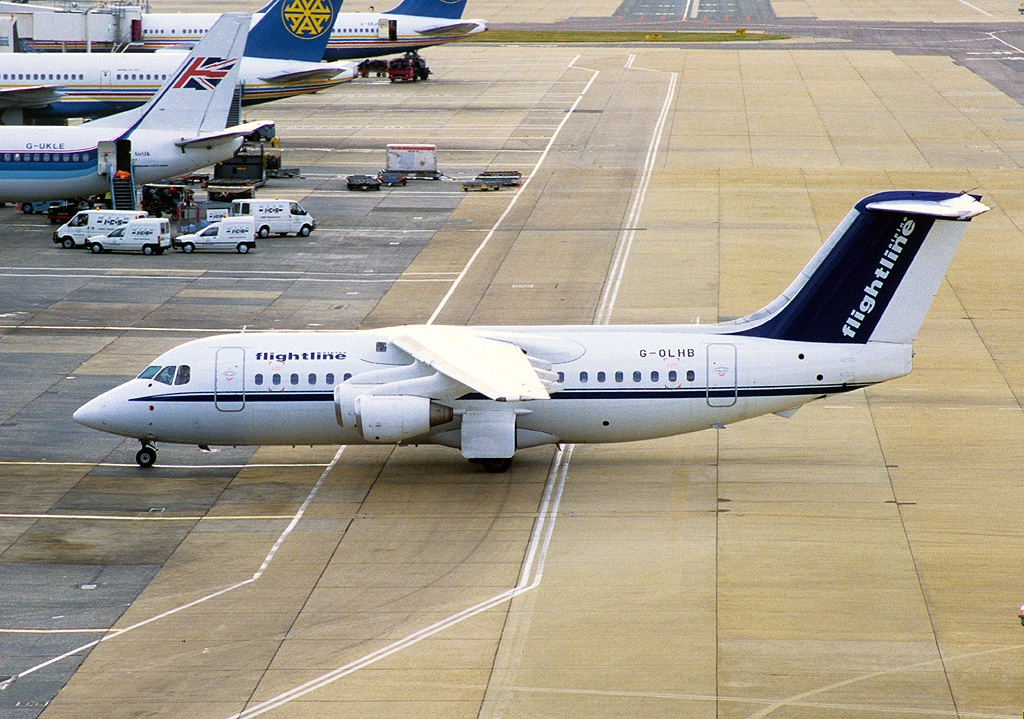
BAe 146-200 operated for Alpine Aviation

The airline was established in April 1989 and started operations in 1990. Initially it had two Embraer EMB 110 Bandeirante aircraft which operated mail and small parcel flights from Southend. Flightline began jet operations with BAe 146s in March 1992 operating on behalf of independent tour operator Palmair from Bournemouth until 1999. In April 1993 own operations were started.

In November 2001 the air carrier took over the contract (previously operated by British World Airlines) to transport oil rig workers between Aberdeen and Scatsta, in the Shetland Isles (SCS). Flightline operated up to 14 flights a day between Aberdeen (ABZ) and Scatsta on behalf of Royal Dutch Shell and other members of the IAC (Integrated Aviation Consortium). Offshore workers were flown to Scatsta Airport and then transferred onto helicopters to several oil platforms, however this contract was due to end in February 2009.

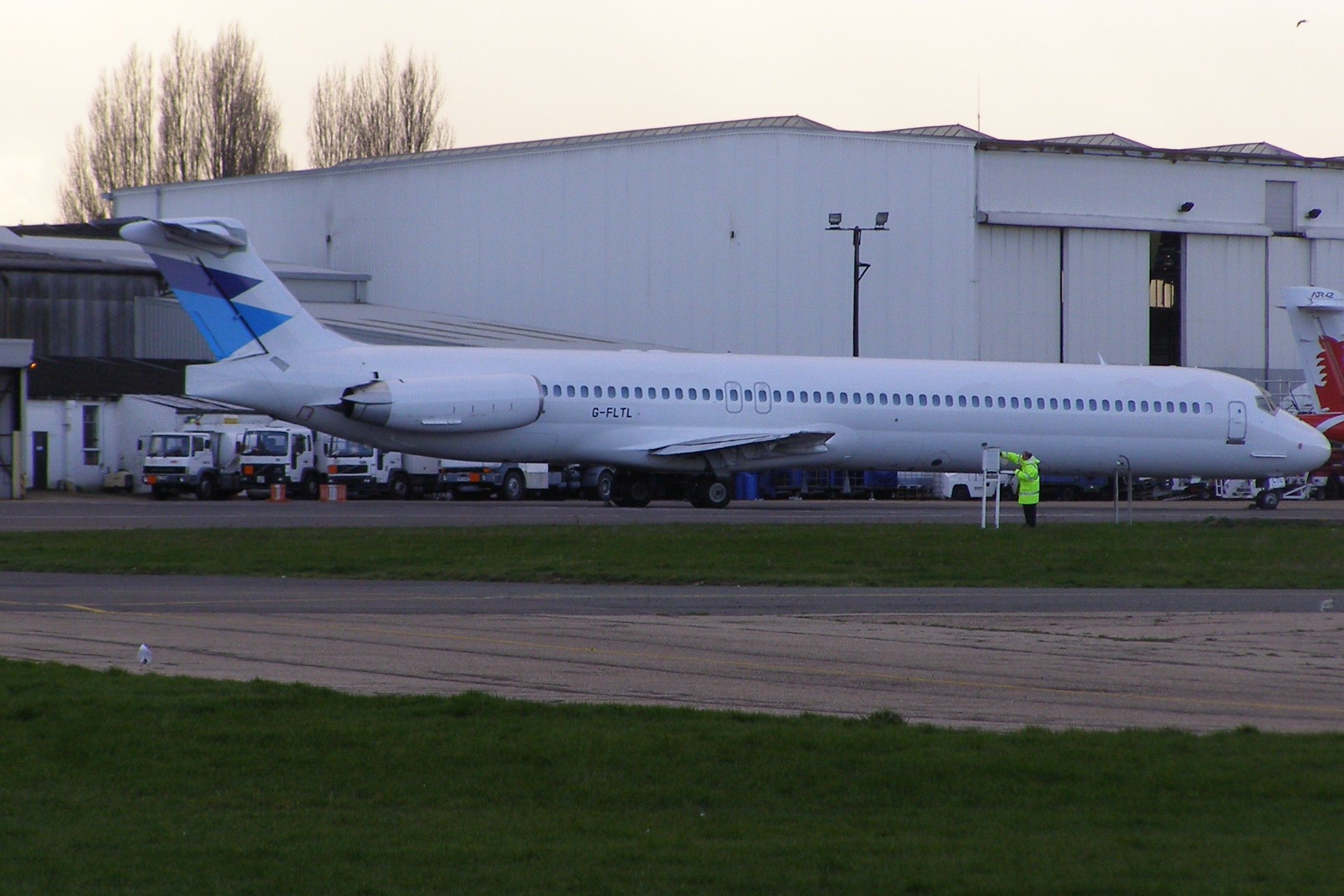
An MD-83 parked at London Southend Airport, England, in 2007

The MD-80 fleet operated a range of holiday charter flights to the Mediterranean, Manchester being a common departure point. The MD-80 fleet was grounded at Southend in November 2008 due to the lack of business in the winter season.

At time of closure the airline had contracts to operate several services on behalf of British Airways out of London City Airport, and also for the Ford car company from their base at Southend (near the Ford European headquarters) to Cologne, Germany. The company was placed into administration on 3 December 2008. Upon its demise the airline had debts exceeding £6 Million.

== Fleet ==
The fleet consisted of the following aircraft (at July 2008):

Aircraft	Total
BAe 146	8
McDonnell Douglas MD-83	3

Flightline also had a maintenance facility at its Southend base which provided base maintenance for the BAe 146 fleet as well as a small number of third party aircraft. The engineering facility was closed in July 2008 in order to raise more funds to keep the airline running.

== Incidents and accidents ==
In August 2007, a Flightline plane operating from Lisbon, Portugal to Dublin, Ireland had to make an emergency go-around after the pilot mistook the lights of a local hotel for the runway and proceeded on approach towards it. The aircraft only diverted from its approach towards the 16 story hotel after being alerted to his mistake by Air Traffic Control.

== See also ==
- List of defunct airlines of the United Kingdom
