= Jet2.com =

Low-cost airline of the United Kingdom

Jet2.com Limited

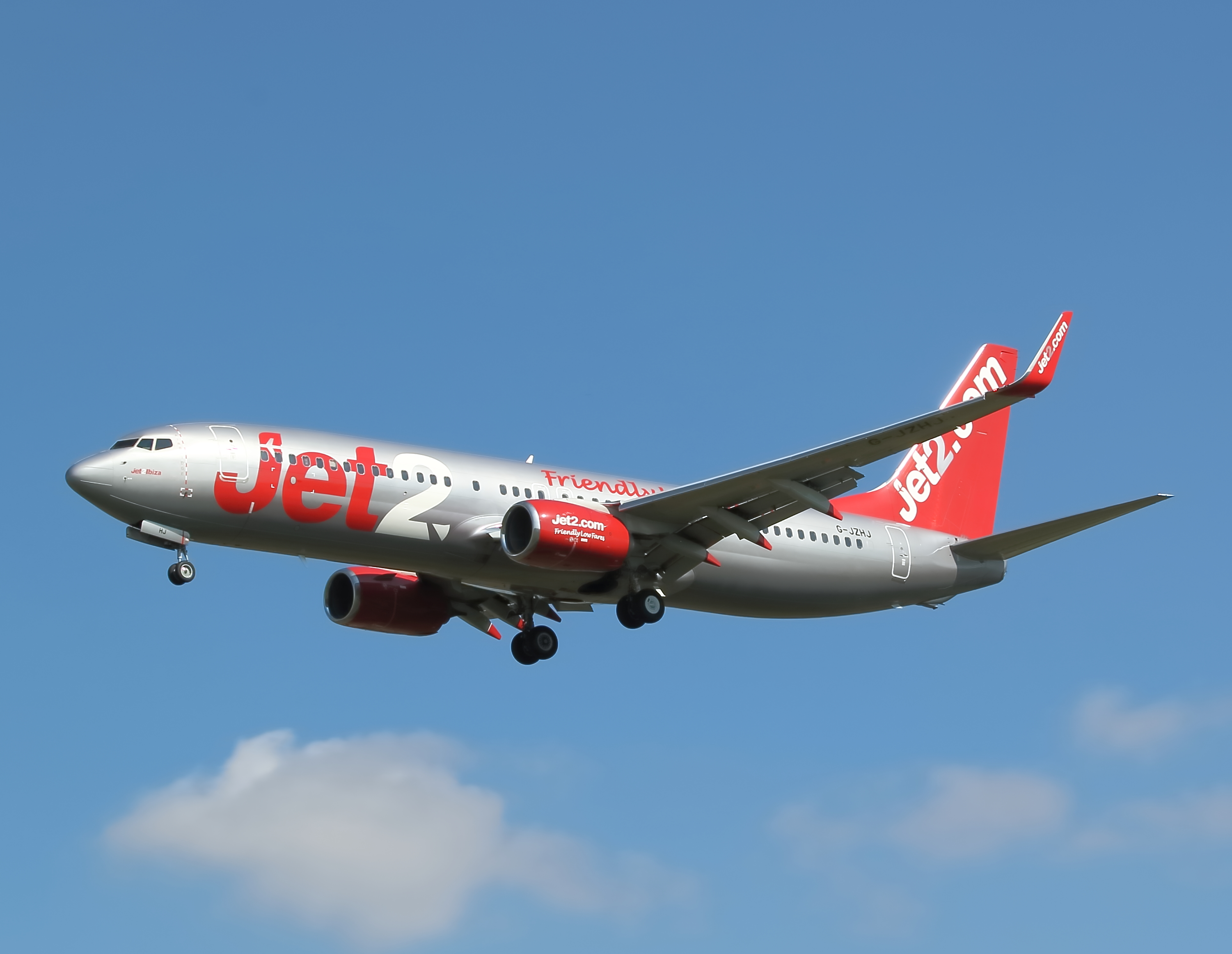
- Jet2 Boeing 737-800 in one of the two standard liveries
IATA	ICAO	Call sign
LS	EXS	CHANNEX
- Commenced operations: 12 February 2003; 23 years ago
- AOC #: 598
- Operating bases: Belfast–International; Birmingham; Bournemouth; Bristol; East Midlands; Edinburgh; Glasgow; Leeds/Bradford; Liverpool; London–Gatwick; London–Luton; London–Stansted; Manchester; Newcastle upon Tyne
- Fleet size: 120
- Destinations: 80
- Parent company: Jet2 plc
- Headquarters: Leeds Bradford Airport, Yorkshire, England
- Key people: Robin Terrell (Non-executive chairman); Steve Heapy (CEO); Phil Ward (Managing director)
- Founder: Philip Meeson
- Website: www.jet2.com

Jet2.com Limited, also branded as Jet2, is a British low-cost airline headquartered near Leeds, Yorkshire, at Leeds Bradford Airport. It is owned by parent company Jet2 plc., and operates scheduled and charter flights from the United Kingdom to Europe destinations. As of 2022, it is the third-largest scheduled airline registered in the UK, behind easyJet and British Airways. Since 2023, Jet2 has also been the largest tour operator in the UK.

Further bases are at Belfast International, Birmingham, Bournemouth, Bristol, East Midlands, Edinburgh, Glasgow, Liverpool, London-Gatwick, London–Luton, London–Stansted, Manchester and Newcastle airports. The company holds a United Kingdom Civil Aviation Authority Type A Operating Licence to carry passengers, cargo and mail on aircraft with 20 or more seats. Jet2 also offers a charter service through its Jet2charters brand.

== History ==
=== Origins ===
Jet2.com is a subsidiary of Jet2 plc, an aviation services group. The airline began operating commercial aircraft in 1983 under the name Channel Express, when it was purchased by the Dart Group's current Executive Chairman, Philip Meeson. Initially a freight operator, from 2001, the airline also began operating passenger charter services using Boeing aircraft to international destinations on mainly short and medium-haul routes.

=== Formative years ===
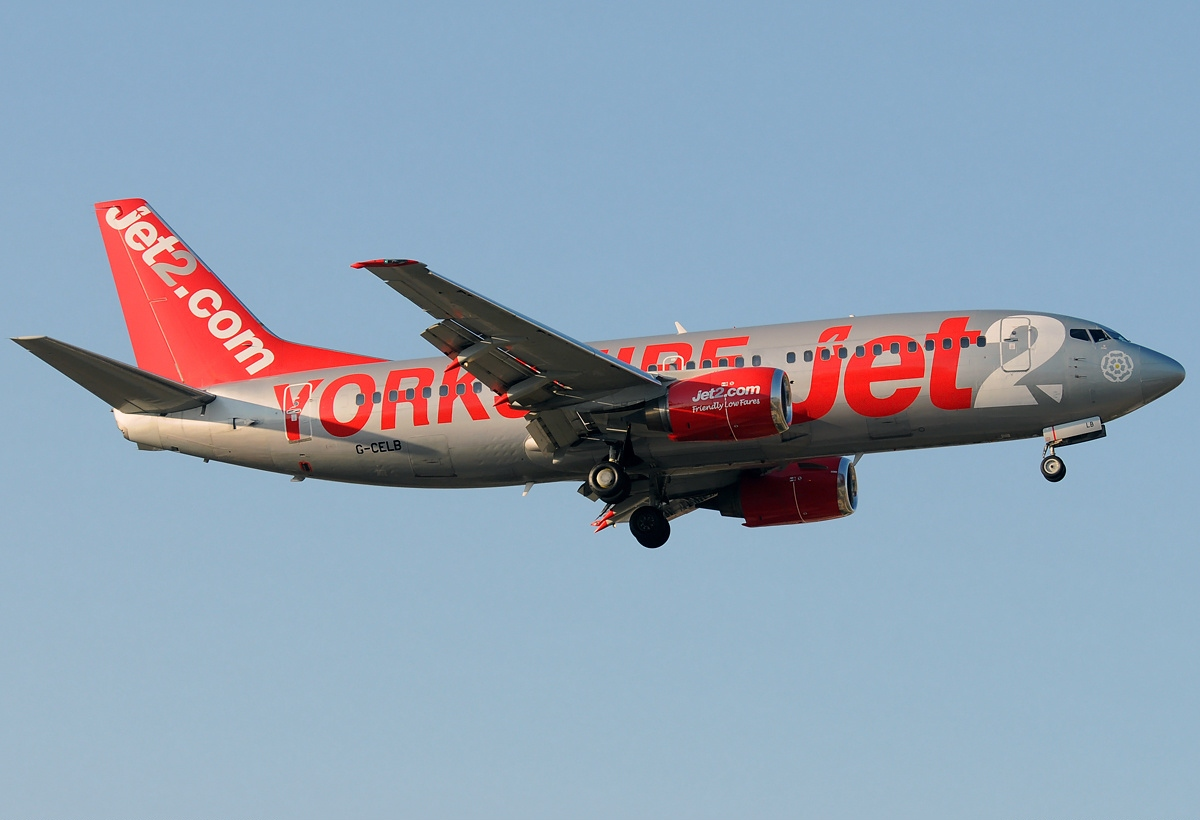
Jet2.com Boeing 737-300 in the former livery in 2011

In 2003, Channel Express launched the Jet2.com brand from Leeds Bradford Airport. It began operating as a leisure airline with its first flight from Leeds Bradford to Amsterdam on 12 February 2003, which operated a twice-daily rotation with two Boeing 737-300 aircraft. During 2003, further scheduled flights were launched to seven European sun and city break destinations.

In 2004, a second base was opened at Manchester Airport with the airline operating from Terminal 1. The airline also acquired further Boeing 737 and 757 aircraft and opened a base at Belfast International Airport. In 2005, Jet2.com opened a third base at Newcastle. Later that year, the company acquired two Boeing 757-200 aircraft, enabling it to fly medium-long haul destinations as well as carrying more passengers on popular existing routes. These aircraft helped the company to open two more bases at Blackpool and Edinburgh. In 2006, the company relocated from Bournemouth to Leeds and was renamed Jet2.com Limited.

=== Expansion ===
In November 2008, Jet2.com changed its slogan from "The North's Low Cost Airline" to "Friendly Low Fares". This preceded the announcement of opening a hub at East Midlands Airport, the first of the airline's hubs outside the North of England and Scotland. The base at East Midlands Airport opened in May 2010.

During November and December 2008, the airline operated four direct flights from Leeds Bradford to Newark Liberty International Airport using Boeing 757–200s, with a series of flights also planned from both Leeds Bradford and Newcastle during December 2010. Once again, Jet2.com re-introduced seasonal Christmas flights to New York during the 2012 winter season; however, this time, flights would operate from Glasgow, East Midlands and Newcastle, in addition to Leeds. The seasonal flights to New York continued annually until 2019 and ran from five of its UK bases. As an effect of the COVID-19 pandemic, the airline cancelled the flights.

In 2010, the airline announced an eighth base at Glasgow Airport would be opened in April 2011, with an initial nine routes. The base was opened on 31 March, slightly earlier than scheduled. In January 2011, the airline introduced second-hand Boeing 737-800 aircraft into its fleet. This provided aircraft larger than its existing 737-300s yet smaller than its 757-200 aircraft.

Jet2.com carried more than 600,000 passengers in its first year of operation and more than nine million passengers during 2017, its highest recorded total.

On 17 September 2016, the airline received its first brand new Boeing 737–800 of the order for thirty made in 2015. In November 2016, Jet2.com opened its new maintenance hangar at Manchester Airport. In December 2016, Jet2.com announced that it had ordered a further four Boeing 737–800 aircraft, bringing the total on order to 34. The airline further expanded by opening its eighth and ninth UK bases in March 2017 at Birmingham and London Stansted airports, the latter being its first in the southeast of England. These have since expanded significantly to become the airline's largest UK bases after Manchester.

=== Recent years ===
In 2019, Jet2.com received delivery of its 34th new Boeing 737–800 aircraft, taking its permanent and leased fleet size to more than 100 aircraft.

Owing to the impact of the COVID-19 pandemic on aviation, Jet2.com announced they were suspending flight operations until at least 15 July 2020. The airline continued to operate repatriation flights for British citizens overseas. On 17 August 2020, Jet2 announced via BALPA that they would be laying off 102 pilots from various UK bases due to the COVID-19 pandemic. In November 2020, Jet2.com and Jet2holidays announced that they would open their tenth United Kingdom base at Bristol Airport on 1 July 2021, operating to 33 destinations.

In August 2021, Jet2.com announced an order for 36 Airbus A321neo aircraft, plus 24 options, totalling an order for 60 planes. Although Jet2 has operated a small number of Airbus jets on lease to cope with summer demand, this is Airbus' first direct order from Jet2, and a clear shift away from the company's traditionally all-Boeing fleet.

Jet2.com celebrated its 20th birthday on 12 February 2023. On the same day, it was revealed that Jet2holidays had become the UK's largest tour operator with an ATOL licence to carry 5.8 million passengers, surpassing TUI's 5.3 million. On 16 May 2023, Jet2 announced they were opening their eleventh UK base at Liverpool John Lennon Airport. In June 2023, Jet2 announced an expansion to their 2024 summer season, with some destinations being made available from earlier months, and extra capacity for other destinations. This includes additional services to Spain, Turkey, Italy and Greece destinations across all of their bases. In July 2023, Jet2 announced that its Chairman Philip Meeson was stepping down. Robin Terrell took over as chairman in September 2023. Robin joined Jet2 as a non-executive director in April 2020. Meeson has now moved to the position of founder and advisor to the board.

In March 2024, Jet2.com announced they would open their twelfth United Kingdom base at Bournemouth Airport on 1 April 2025, operating to 16 destinations. Also in March 2024, Jet2 launched its first flight from Liverpool John Lennon Airport to Tenerife, marking the start of its new services to 20 different holiday destinations with plans for further expansion in summer 2025. In July 2024, Jet2.com announced that they were bringing forward the launch of their operations from Bournemouth Airport to February 2025, due to high demand with their first flight operating to Tenerife. In November 2024, Jet2.com announced they would be opening up a thirteenth UK base at London Luton Airport, basing two Airbus A321neo aircraft flying to 17 destinations from 1 April 2025.

In December 2025, Jet2 announced plans to resume flights and package holidays to Egypt, with scheduled services to Sharm El Sheikh and Hurghada beginning in February 2027.

== In popular culture ==
In the summer of 2025, Jet2's long-running marketing campaign, "Hold My Hand", became a popular meme on TikTok, often showing a compilation of comedic and/or strange visuals. The marketing campaign, voiced by British actress Zoë Lister and famous for using the Jess Glynne song "Hold My Hand", has been in use since 2015, and gained international popularity on social media apps a decade later.

== Corporate affairs ==
=== Head office ===
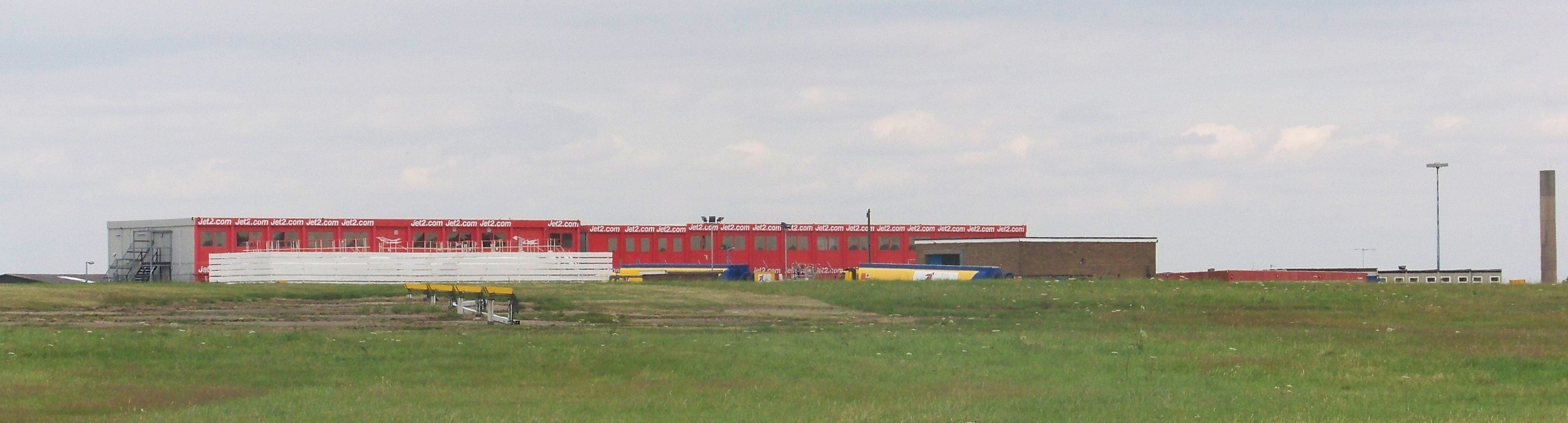
Low Fare Finder House, the head office of Jet2.com at Leeds Bradford International Airport

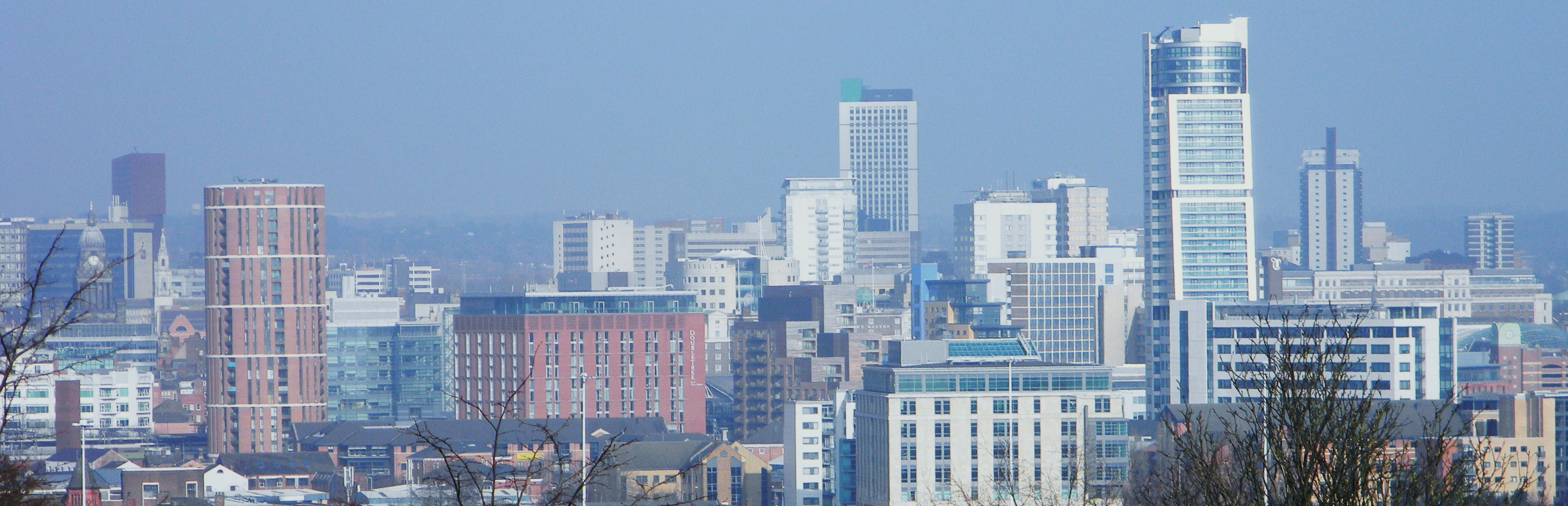
Leeds skyline with Holiday House in the foreground which houses the commercial office for Jet2 plc

Jet2.com's registered office, Low Fare Finder House, is located on the grounds of Leeds Bradford International Airport. Construction of the facility broke ground in 2006, in order to accommodate pilots, cabin crew, and back of house operations. In April 2013, Jet2.com moved its Customer Contact, Finance, IT, Human Resources, Commercial and Marketing departments to a new office, "Holiday House", located within the city centre of Leeds. In September 2014, the airline opened a new £9.5 million training academy at Euroway Industrial Estate in Bradford. In addition to the training centre located in Bradford, Jet2.com announced in February 2023 that they had opened a new £8.5 million training centre in Cheadle. Both training centres will operate in parallel.

=== Senior leadership ===
- Non-executive chairman: Robin Terrell (since September 2023)
- Chief executive officer: Steve Heapy (since January 2013)

==== Former chairmen ====
- Philip Meeson (2003–2023)

==== Former chief executives ====
- Philip Meeson (2003–2013)

=== Subsidiaries ===
In 2007, sister company Jet2holidays was launched offering package holidays. In 2011, Jet2 launched their new brand, Indulgent Escapes, providing more luxurious getaways. On 29 April 2015, sister company Jet2CityBreaks was launched. In June 2017, Jet2.com launched Jet2Villas through its Jet2holidays brand.

=== Ownership ===
Jet2.com is wholly owned by Jet2 plc (formerly Dart Group PLC), a holding company based in Leeds, England.

=== Statistics ===
Year	Total passengers	Total flights	Load factor	Passenger change (YoY)
2003	604,563	5,543	78.9%	–
2004	1,211,139	11,266	79.1%	▲100.3%
2005	2,376,900	24,151	74.5%	▲96.3%
2006	2,831,922	26,808	77.2%	▲19.1%
2007	3,860,266	34,358	73.6%	▲36.3%
2008	3,454,578	27,851	79.4%	▼10.5%
2009	3,089,340	24,282	81.6%	▼10.6%
2010	3,338,921	24,708	86.3%	▲8.1%
2011	4,235,752	29,806	87.3%	▲26.9%
2012	4,776,257	32,520	89.0%	▲12.8%
2013	5,515,021	36,064	89.8%	▲15.5%
2014	6,007,549	39,362	89.0%	▲8.9%
2015	5,853,447	36,657	91.3%	▼2.6%
2016	6,721,129	41,796	90.8%	▲14.8%
2017	9,695,445	58,541	90.6%	▲30.7%
2018	12,170,681	70,963	91.4%	▲25.5%
2019	14,393,162	82,931	90.9%	▲18.3%
2020	2,851,455	20,287	74.8%	▼80.2%
2021	3,168,738	27,879	62.9%	▲11.1%
2022	15,533,430	92,062	87.8%	▲390.2%
2023	17,321,108	100,817	88.9%	▲11.5%
2024	19,495,418	114,496	87.9%	▲12.6%
2025	20,522,019	122,978	85.5%	▲5.3%
Source: United Kingdom Civil Aviation Authority

== Destinations ==
Jet2.com operates flights to 70 destinations in Europe, with a focus on Spain, the Mediterranean Sea, Bulgaria, France, Greece, Italy and Turkey. Its main base is at Leeds Bradford Airport with twelve additional operating bases across the United Kingdom as well as overseas bases at Alicante Airport, Palma de Mallorca Airport and Tenerife South Airport.

Biggest bases of Jet2.com (April 2025)
Rank	Airport	IATA	Destinations
1.	Manchester	MAN	72
2.	Birmingham	BHX	70
3.	Leeds/Bradford	LBA	55
4.	Newcastle upon Tyne	NCL	54
5.	London–Stansted	STN	53
6.	Bristol	BRS	42
7.	Edinburgh	EDI	41
8.	East Midlands	EMA	38
9.	Glasgow	GLA	33
10.	Liverpool	LPL	28
11.	Belfast–International	BFS	26
12.	Bournemouth	BOH	22
13.	London–Luton	LTN	17

=== Interline agreements ===
- Air Transat

== Fleet ==
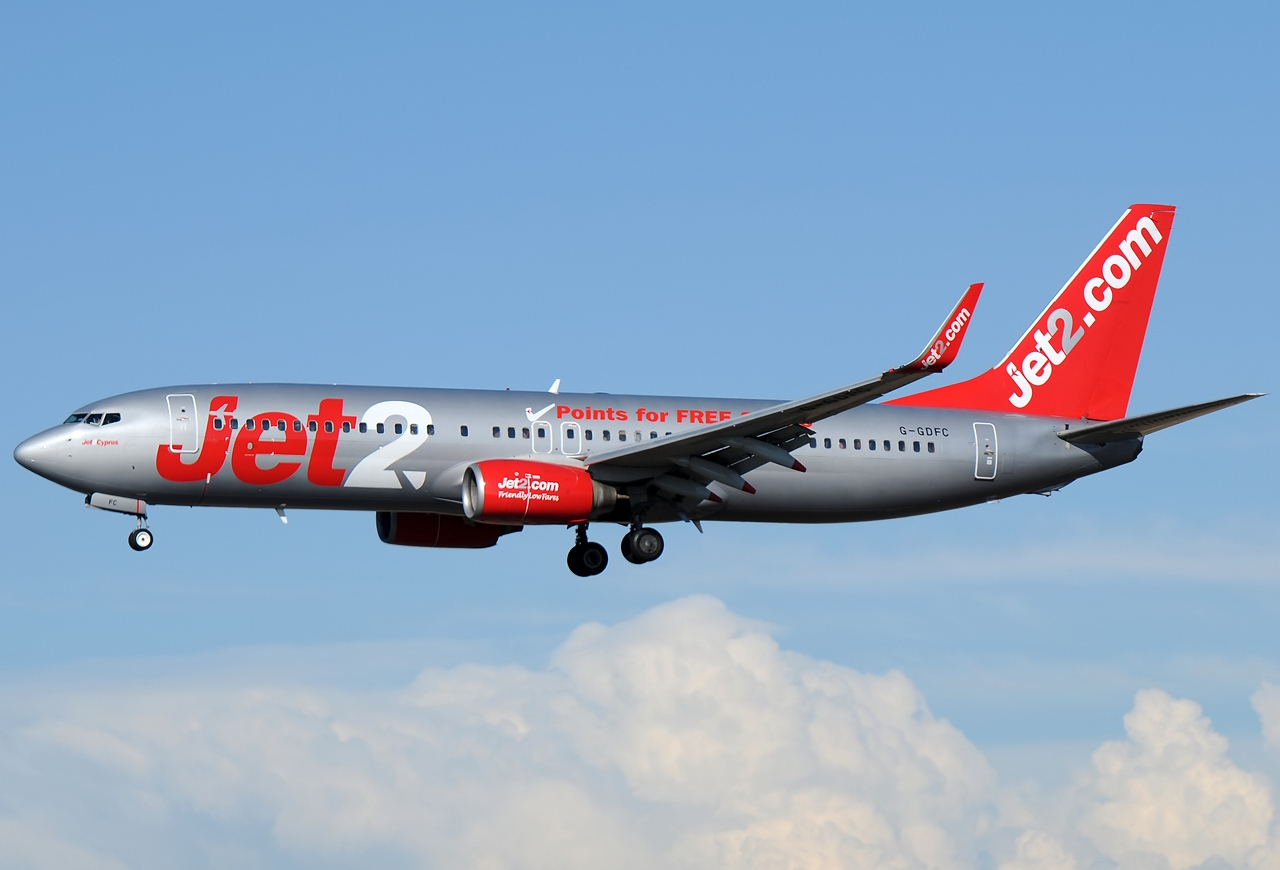
Jet2.com Boeing 737-800

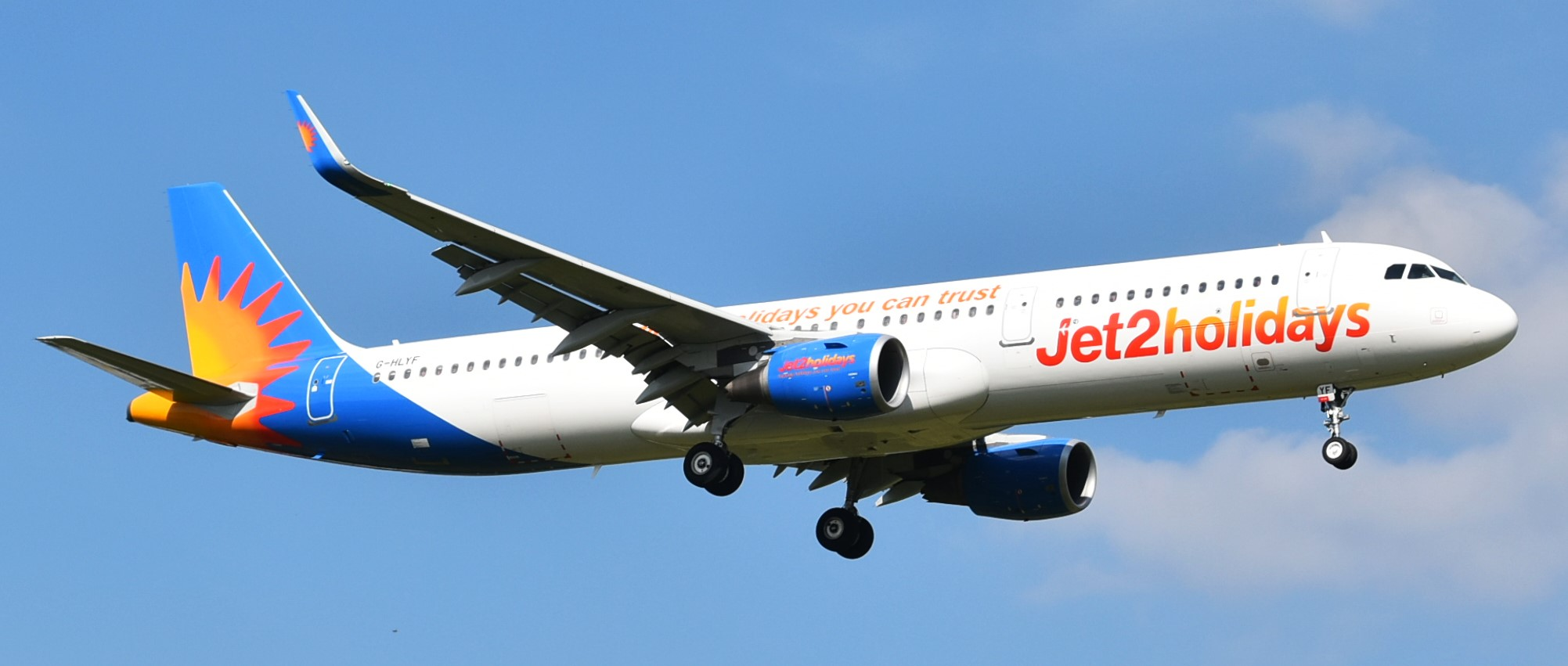
Jet2.com Airbus A321-200 in Jet2holidays livery

=== Current fleet ===
As of October 2025, Jet2.com operates the following aircraft:

Jet2.com fleet
Aircraft	In service	Orders	Passengers	Notes
Airbus A321-200	5	—	220	
Airbus A321neo	23	129	232	Airbus A320neo orders converted to the larger A321neo in July 2024.
Boeing 737-300	7	—	148	
Boeing 737-800	98	—	189	
Total	133	129		

=== Fleet development ===
In October 2021, Jet2.com announced that they had placed an order with Airbus to purchase multiple Airbus A321neo aircraft. In July 2022, Jet2.com further announced that they had expanded their order with Airbus, ordering a total of 60 A321neo aircraft. In October 2022, Jet2.com announced an additional order for 35 Airbus A320neo aircraft; however, in July 2024, this order was converted into the larger A321neo, and later that month, Jet2.com exercised its remaining purchase options with Airbus taking the total order up to 146 A321neo aircraft. These aircraft are intended to increase the fleet size along with replacing older 737-300 and 757-200 aircraft. In January 2025, the remaining Boeing 757s were phased out of the fleet with Jet2.com being the last UK airline to operate the passenger variant.

=== Historic fleet ===
Jet2.com previously operated the following aircraft types:

Jet2.com historic fleet
Aircraft	Total	Year introduced	Year retired	Notes
Boeing 757-200	17	2005	2025	Last UK passenger airline to operate the type.
