= Bournemouth Airport =

Airport in Bournemouth, England

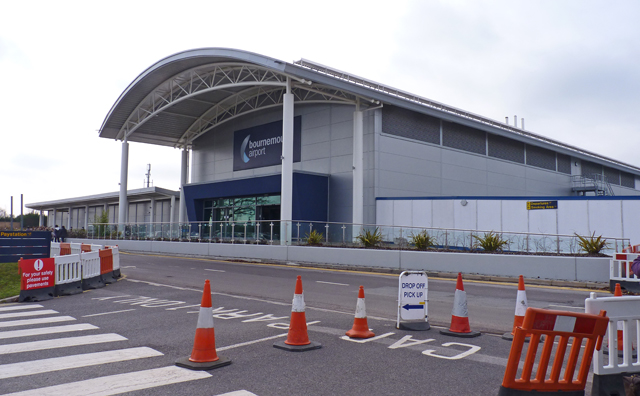
- IATA: BOH; ICAO: EGHH; WMO: 03862

Summary
- Airport type: Public
- Owner/Operator: Rigby Group
- Serves: Bournemouth
- Location: Hurn, England
- Opened: 1944; 82 years ago
- Focus city for: Jet2.com; Ryanair; TUI Airways
- Built: 1941; 85 years ago
- Elevation AMSL: 38 ft (12 m)
- Coordinates: 50°46′48″N 001°50′33″W
- Website: www.bournemouthairport.com

Map
- Location in Dorset BOH/EGHH (the United Kingdom)

Runways
Direction	Length		Surface
Direction	m	ft	Surface
08/26	2,272	7,454	Asphalt

Statistics (2025)
- Passengers: 1,380,454
- Passenger change 24-25: ▲26.84%
- Aircraft movements: 24,861
- Movements change 24-25: ▲18.39%
- Sources: UK AIP at NATS; Statistics from the UK Civil Aviation Authority

Bournemouth Airport (IATA: BOH, ICAO: EGHH), previously known as Hurn Airport and Bournemouth International Airport, is an international airport located 4 miles (6.4 kilometres) north-northeast of Bournemouth, England.

Subsequently, Ryanair and TUI Airways based aircraft at the airport, with scheduled flights now frequently serving Western Europe and the Mediterranean area, with charter and seasonal services serving North Africa, North America, and the Caribbean. Passenger numbers peaked in 2007 when just over one million passed through the airport. In 2019, the passenger total was around 803,000. This dropped to around 176,000 in 2020 due to the COVID-19 pandemic.

Ryanair and TUI Airways are the primary users of the airport, which was owned and operated by Manchester Airports Group (MAG), one of the largest British airport operators until December 2017, when Regional & City Airports (RCA) acquired Bournemouth Airport for an undisclosed amount.

== Location ==
Bournemouth Airport is situated on the edge of Hurn village in the BCP Council area, 4 miles (6 km) north of Bournemouth, 1 mile (1.6 km) west of the A338 and approximately 100 miles (160 km) south west of London. The airport is accessible via the A31 from the M27 and M3 motorways to the east, and via the A35 to the west. The nearest other airport serving the area is Southampton Airport.

== History ==
Before World War II, Bournemouth's airport was Christchurch Airfield.

=== 1940s ===
From November 1944, the airfield took over from Bristol's Whitchurch airport as the main operating base for British Overseas Airways Corporation until Heathrow fully opened in 1948. Starting in October 1945, Hurn served as London's transatlantic airport until Heathrow opened to the airlines in mid-1946. In that role, it participated in the "First Commercial Land Plane Flight Overseas" from the United States, on 23 October. (That intercontinental flight in the Douglas DC-4 involved refueling stops at Gander, Newfoundland and Shannon in the Republic of Ireland.)

In January 1946 Pan Am opened a scheduled New York (La Guardia) to London (Hurn) service, five days a week, using the new DC-4; the journey time was 17 hours 40 minutes. It was also the starting point of the first England-Australia landplane service, which took three days in Avro Lancastrians (modified Lancaster bombers).

=== 1950s–1980s ===
==== First charter flights ====
The first Palmair charter from the airport took place in 1958, using a single 36-seat Viking aircraft destined for Palma de Mallorca. The service was one of the first charter flights in the United Kingdom.

==== Aircraft manufacture ====
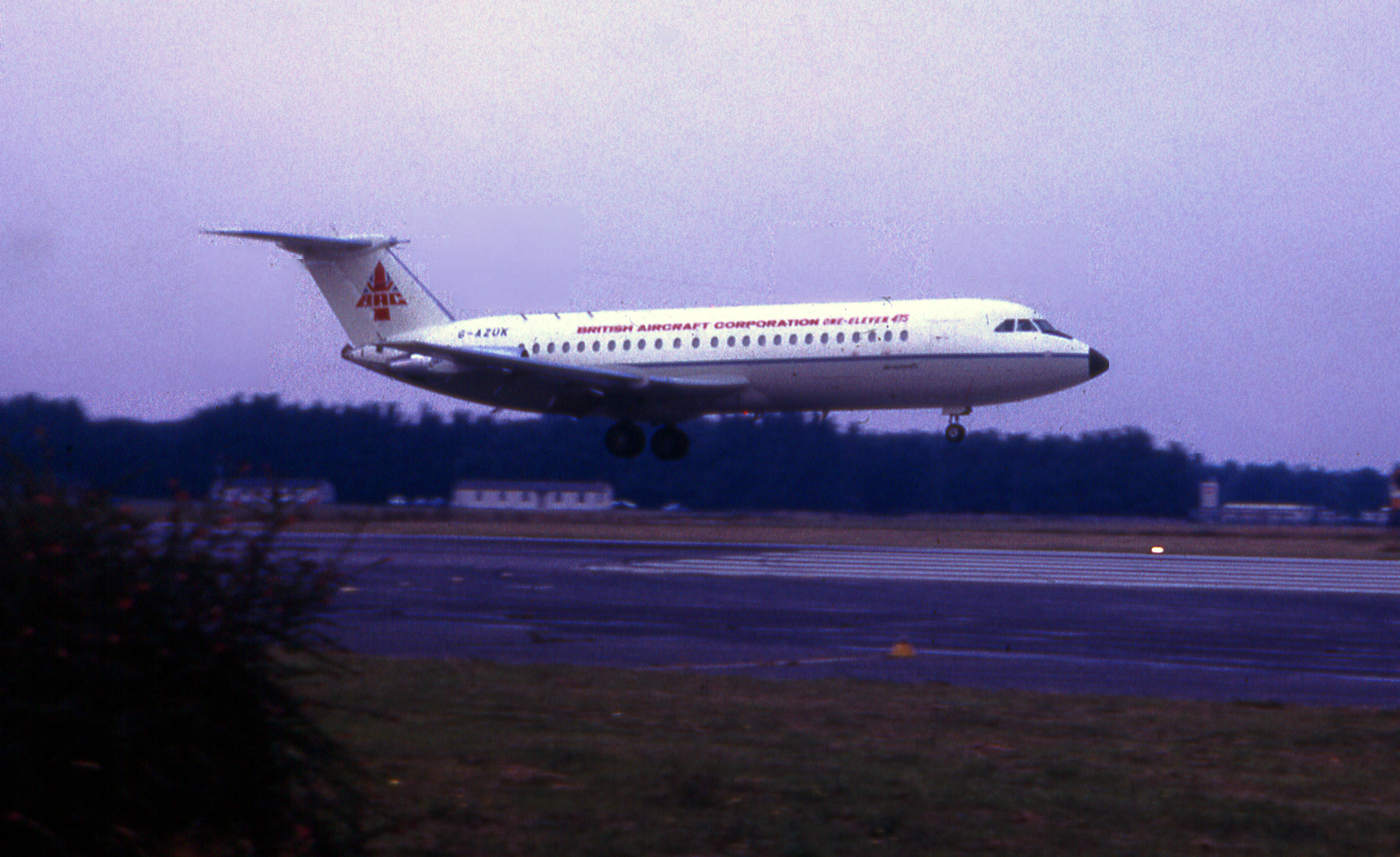
A BAC 1-11 in British Aircraft Corporation house colours at Bournemouth Airport in 1971

Vickers-Armstrongs took over some ex-BOAC hangars at Hurn in 1951 and started production of Varsities, then Viscounts and eventually, as the British Aircraft Corporation, the BAC One-Eleven. During a 33-year period, 222 One-Elevens, 146 Varsities and 279 Viscounts were built and delivered from Hurn making a total of 647 produced at this site.

Some of the development of the ill-fated TSR-2 was also done here (although assembly and flight testing was carried out at Warton, Lancs), as well as the production of Jet Provost wings; other components were manufactured here for Concorde, the Panavia Tornado and Short Skyvan. The closure of the British Aerospace site in 1984 ended Bournemouth's role as a significant player in the aircraft manufacturing industry. The former aircraft factory now forms one of Dorset's largest industrial sites, including a base for Cobham plc.

==== College of Air Traffic Control ====
Adjacent to the entrance to Bournemouth Airport was the College of Air Traffic Control, operated by NATS, the now privatised provider of air traffic control services in the UK. Established by the Ministry of Civil Aviation as the School of Air Traffic Control in 1949, the establishment was retitled as a college in 1962. Students from home and abroad were trained in all aspects of ATC operations and went on to work throughout the world. Electronic computer-based ATC simulators were widely employed. Usefully situated at an operational airfield, for a considerable period training in approach radar control was facilitated by the airport ATC unit. Students were able to practise live radar control exercises using temporarily detached Civil Aviation Flying Unit Dove aircraft as live targets. The building was also the home to the Air Traffic Control Evaluation Unit, responsible for developing technology used within the service.

During 2011, NATS transferred ATC training to its headquarters facility at Whiteley near Southampton. The Hurn facility was purchased by a free school, Parkfield School, serving Bournemouth and the local area.

==== First British woman air traffic controller ====
Yvonne Pope Sintes was the first British woman air traffic controller and worked at Bournemouth Airport when first qualified, before graduating to Gatwick and later becoming Britain's first female commercial airline captain.

==== Airwork Fleet Requirements Unit ====
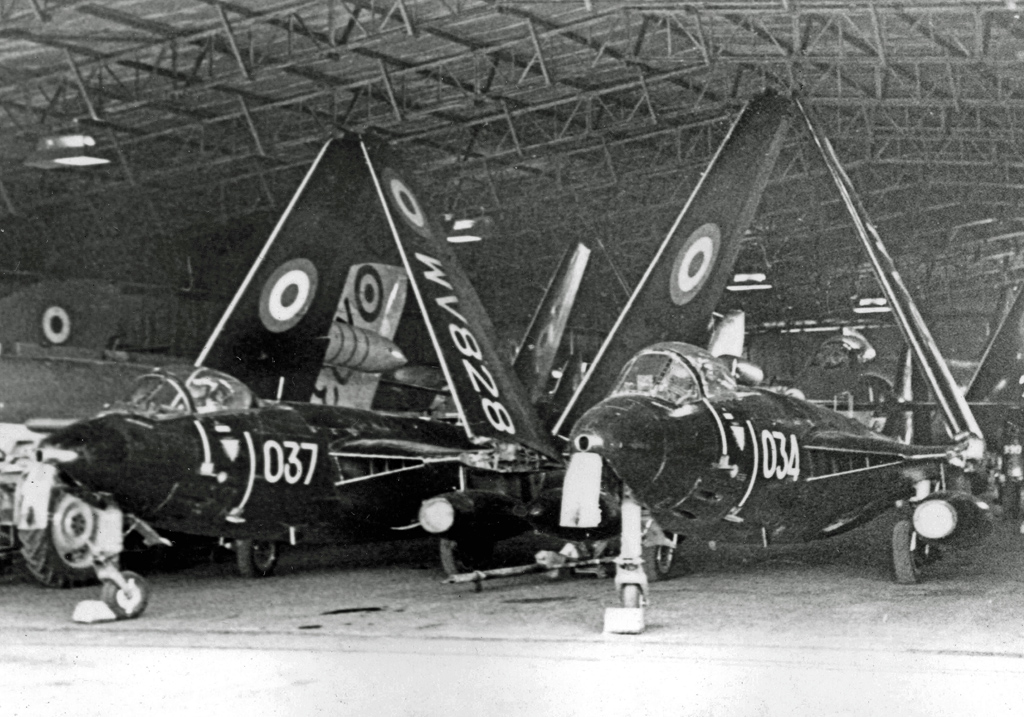
Hawker Sea Hawk aircraft, of the Airwork FRU, at Bournemouth (Hurn) Airport in 1967

Airwork Services from 1957 for defence support work, secured a contract in September 1952 with the Royal Navy, to operate the Fleet Requirements Unit (FRU) at Hurn. It used ex-Fleet Air Arm aircraft as targets to provide training for Royal Navy radar operators, however, civilian pilots were employed to fly the aircraft. During the summer of 1959 Airwork moved its head office from Langley to Hurn and centralised its overhaul facilities there. In October 1972 the FRU moved to RNAS Yeovilton (HMS Heron), in Somerset.

==== Change of ownership ====
In 1969, the airport was purchased jointly by the Bournemouth Corporation and Dorset County Council and renamed as "Bournemouth Hurn Airport", later to become Bournemouth International Airport. The new owners decided to redevelop the facility as a commercial airport and, by 1980, the airport became used by charter airlines, when European Aviation began services.

=== 1990s–2000s ===
In 1993, the airport received its first regular passenger flights when Palmair wet leased its first aircraft and European Aviation Air Charter (EAC) started operations. In 1995, the airport was sold to National Express and then, in March 2001, was acquired by the Manchester Airports Group, which was at that time the second-largest owner of UK airports.

In 1996, an extension to the main runway was officially opened by the arrival of Concorde. Travel agency Bath Travel chartered Concorde for supersonic champagne lunches across the Bay of Biscay. Ryanair also began services from Bournemouth to Dublin with a Boeing 737-200.

Since 2001, a Boeing 747SP has been based at the airport; it is used by the Royal Family of Qatar and other VIP government staff from the Middle East state of Qatar. The aircraft is often stored in the former BASCO building (Hangar 12) and is a regular visitor to Zürich Airport and Heathrow.

In late 2001, Bournemouth Flying Club took the leap into full commercial flight training and established Bournemouth Commercial Flight Training on the former SFT site adjacent to the threshold for runway 08. Bournemouth Commercial Flight Training (BCFT) has adapted and expanded throughout its history, contributing to the overall success of the airport and continuing to make Bournemouth Airport important to the overall commercial flight training in the UK.

Bath Travel's Palmair remained the prime user of the airport, with a 737-200 permanently based there. In 2005, Thomsonfly became the first major low-cost airline to establish a hub at Bournemouth, allocating two Boeing 737-300 aircraft for scheduled services to Europe and (in 2008) to the Caribbean. Also in 2005, Air Berlin and EasyJet began services by announcing routes to Paderborn and Geneva respectively. Air Berlin have now ceased operations at the airport. The airport previously had a daily service to the Channel Islands provided by the Jersey-based Blue Islands airline, which withdrew from Bournemouth in April 2009. Hungarian-based Wizz Air also ran routes to Gdansk, Katowice, and Kraków during 2006 and 2007.

In December 2017 Manchester Airports Group sold the airport to the Rigby Group. In August 2025 the airport was purchased by ICG.

=== Route development ===
In 2007, Ryanair began to rapidly increase the number of services from the airport, initially starting routes to Marseille, Alicante, and Milan which brought the total to eight. In 2008, Palmair introduced a new series of charter flights to Tunisia, Fuerteventura, Naples, Amalfi Coast, and Rhodes. Olympic Holidays also launched new charter flights to Corfu and Zakynthos in Greece and Larnaca in Cyprus.

On 9 January 2008, Ryanair announced that they would base one of their Boeing 737-800s at Bournemouth from April 2008. During the first quarter, the airline announced routes to Málaga, Murcia, Palma de Mallorca, Wrocław and the re-introduction of the Nantes route. An additional flight each day was added to the Glasgow Prestwick route, with the addition of a twice-daily flight to Edinburgh. In May the same year, Bergamo and Beauvais routes were announced to commence in October plus a new weekly ski flight to Turin for the winter season.

Increasing from 14 routes, after the discontinuation of the Nantes route, to 18 – Carcassonne, Faro, Limoges, and Reus were added to the route network in February 2009.

In December 2009, bmibaby announced a new summer route to Jersey. It was the first time the airline had operated out of the airport; they provided three services a week, using a Boeing 737-500. Again in December, Ryanair added four new routes to the network, bringing the total to 17. Another Boeing 737-800 was based at the airport and the airline projected to fly 650,000 passengers per annum at Bournemouth, however the actual figure was lower.

Following the closure of European Aviation Air Charter, Palmair chartered various aircraft types from Jet2, Viking, Blue Line, Tor Air and Astraeus, before unveiling their new Astraeus-leased Boeing 737-500 (G-PJPJ) on 13 May 2009. The original agreement was for the aircraft to be leased until April 2012, but the airline ceased operations in October 2010.

Flybe started services in May 2010 but discontinued services in November the same year. It led to no scheduled services from the airport. After a hiatus of services, Blue Islands recommenced services to Guernsey and Jersey on 1 November 2011. Flybe announced on 10 November 2015 that all destinations would end 27 March 2016

In September 2016 one of the UK's newest AOC's Scenic Air Tours started operations from the airport, offering pleasure/scenic flights along the south coast and aircraft rentals. The company has now expanded with a second operating base at Teesside International Airport in the North East. The company operates two Piper PA-28 and one Grumman American AA-5.

In November 2016, Bournemouth based Eagle European commenced operations on its A – B AOC, flying the Cessna 421 Golden Eagle on charter flights, focusing heavily on the medical role.

During the Summer of 2021, influenced by the ongoing pandemic and international travel restrictions, easyJet operated its first UK domestic services to Edinburgh, Belfast and later Liverpool.

In March 2024, Jet2 the UK's largest tour operator and third largest airline which was originally founded in Bournemouth as Channel Express Airways announced that it would serve 16 new destinations in Spain, Greece, Portugal and Turkey would become available from the airport by April 2025. TUI and Ryanair also expanded their services in summer 2026.

== Expansion ==
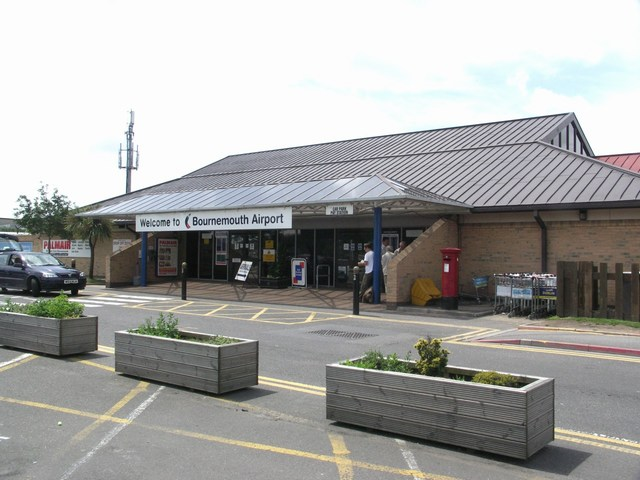
The former terminal building, which has been replaced under expansion

With the budget increased to £45 million in July 2008, the plan intended to replace the arrivals terminal and upgrade the check-in and departure lounge areas. The number of aircraft stands to rise from four to 11. Christchurch Council and central government backed plans for the re-building of the airport terminal, increasing its size by 62%; work started in August 2007.

Work on the terminal itself is now complete, where the check-in areas, security control, and departure lounges have been upgraded. A new World Duty Free store has opened on the airside, as have a new WHSmith store and The Olive Tree eatery. All remaining retail space has since been completed and opened.

The new arrivals hall was completed on time and budget in July 2011. The building produces 70% less carbon dioxide than the previous facility with the design taking advantage of the building's orientation to make maximum possible use of solar gain, solar shading, daylight, and natural ventilation. These measures will reduce the need for mechanical and electrical installations which, in turn, will reduce the building's energy requirements.

Other changes to the infrastructure around the airport include adding traffic lights at the entrance to the airport.

== Airlines and destinations ==
The following airlines operate regular scheduled flights to and from Bournemouth:

=== Passenger ===
Airlines	Destinations
easyJet	Seasonal: Geneva
Jet2.com	Fuerteventura, Funchal, Gran Canaria, Lanzarote, Tenerife–South; Seasonal: Agadir, Alicante, Antalya, Corfu, Dalaman, Faro, Heraklion, Ibiza, Jersey (begins 24 April 2027), Kos, Menorca, Palma de Mallorca, Paris–Charles de Gaulle (begins 26 April 2027), Reus (begins 2 May 2027), Rhodes, Verona (begins 28 April 2027), Zakynthos
Ryanair	Alicante, Edinburgh, Faro, Gran Canaria, Kraków, Lanzarote, Málaga, Malta, Tenerife–South, Wrocław; Seasonal: Bergerac, Carcassonne, Chania, Fuerteventura, Girona, Murcia, Palma de Mallorca, Porto (begins 31 March 2027), Rhodes, Trapani, Toulouse (begins 4 June 2027), Zadar
TUI Airways	Lanzarote, Tenerife–South; Seasonal: Antalya, Corfu, Dalaman, Gran Canaria, Heraklion, Ibiza, Innsbruck (begins 20 December 2027), Kefalonia, Kos, Menorca, Palma de Mallorca, Paphos, Rhodes, Zakynthos

== Statistics ==
=== Passengers ===
	Passengers (Note: Number of passengers including domestic, international and transit.)	Aircraft movements (Note: Number of movements represents total takeoffs and landings during that year.)	Bournemouth Airport passenger totals 2003–2022 (millions)
2003	460,872	76,177	
2004	492,882	77,142	
2005	829,108	79,512	
2006	960,773	75,505	
2007	1,083,379	71,742	
2008	1,078,941	78,527	
2009	868,445	82,538	
2010	751,331	55,398	
2011	613,755	51,799	
2012	689,913	51,089	
2013	660,272	47,174	
2014	661,584	43,122	
2015	706,776	43,020	
2016	667,981	36,922	
2017	694,660	34,641	
2018	674,972	39,886	
2019	803,307	39,886	
2020	175,907	28,370	
2021	200,640	38,304 (Note: 38,304 includes a high number (18,977) of Test and Training flights (2021))	
2022	734,530	29,186	
2023	950,206	20,650 (Note: 20,650 includes only 402 Test and Training flights (2023))	
2024	1,088,370	21,000	
2025	1,380,454	24,861	

=== Routes ===
Busiest routes to and from Bournemouth (2025)
Rank	Airport	Total passengers	Change 2024 / 25
1	Palma de Mallorca	167,031	▲21.4%
2	Alicante	120,161	▲17.4%
3	Tenerife South	110,370	▲8.2%
4	Málaga	103,162	▲54.4%
5	Faro	93,568	▲61.7%
6	Lanzarote	80,029	▲42.8%
7	Krakow	63,717	▲55.6%
8	Edinburgh	50,172	▼1.0%
9	Girona	48,615	▼18.5%
10	Malta	44,350	▲4.5%

== Other facilities ==
The airport has a 200-acre (0.81 km^{2}) industrial park, including offices and hangars. In early March 2009, Manchester Airport Developments completed the construction of Cirrus Court, a development of 14 industrial units which is the first part of a number of phases to redevelop the northern aviation sector.

When Channel Express operated, its head office was in Building 470 at the airport.

Babcock International Group has its Defence and Security offices located at the airport.

L3 CTS (formerly CTC Aviation) used to have its main U.K flight training base at the airfield with students completing basic, intermediate and advanced training there. Located on the East side from its purpose built hangar, the company operated a fleet of Diamond DA42, Slingsby T67 Firefly and recently Diamond DA40 aircraft. Their Bournemouth base complemented its facilities in Southampton, Coventry, Ponte de Sor (Portugal), Hamilton (New Zealand) and Cranfield.

Bournemouth Commercial Flight Training and Airline Pilot Academy Operated from its main office and hangar on Aviation Park West adjacent to the National Police Air Service (NPAS) facility. The apron provided parking for its commercial fleet including two BE76 Duchess and four Piper PA-28 aircraft. They also had hangared aircraft belonging to the company, including a Pilatus PC-12, a SIAI-Marchetti SF.260, a Beagle B.121 Pup, a Scottish Aviation Bulldog, a Partenavia P.68 and several Robin HR 200 aircraft. BCFT specialised in modular flight training whilst its sister company APA was pioneering a new and dynamic approach to Integrated Flight Training with bases at Bournemouth International Airport and Melbourne Orlando International Airport. It ceased operations in early September 2022.

Scenic Air Tours, an A to A AOC holder, also operates from Aviation Park West with its main base of operation at the airport. Its secondary base located at Teesside International Airport houses one of its Piper PA-28 aircraft available for sightseeing and aerial photography. The Bournemouth-based fleet consists of a Piper PA-28 and Grumman American AA-5, both available for sightseeing trips and rentals.

Bournemouth is the home of a dedicated Pilatus maintenance facility, focusing on the Pilatus PC-12, serving aircraft from across Europe. Jetfly Aviation, a fractional ownership company, uses the Bournemouth facility for its maintenance needs and has aircraft and crew based at the airport.

The airport is also home to several other maintenance facilities, all specialising in various areas of the industry. The largest for general aviation aircraft is Airtime Aviation, providing maintenance for aircraft up to the size of Beechcraft King Air. Airtime also provide aircraft painting through its sister company, Airtime Paint, handling all kinds of aircraft including small jets. Fast Aviation also provides maintenance for general aviation aircraft and is based on the north side of the airfield. MCA provide specialist King Air support and maintenance, with several worldwide contracts. Jets and Technic Air provide maintenance for Jet aircraft and smaller turboprop airliners.

Handling for general aviation aircraft is provided by two companies. Bliss Aviation, a small flight school specialising in helicopter training, provides handling for smaller aircraft such as Piper PA-28 and larger multi-engine pistons like Piper Chieftain and Beechcraft Baron. Larger corporate aircraft are handled by Signature Flight Support, often handling aircraft up to the size of Gulfstream G650 and Falcon 7X.

== Accidents and incidents ==
- On 21 March 1944, a Royal Air Force Halifax Bomber crashed in Moordown soon after takeoff.
- On 28 January 1972, Vickers Viscount D-ANEF of Airwork Services was damaged beyond repair when the undercarriage collapsed after a heavy landing.
- On 23 September 2007, a Thomson Airways Boeing 737-300 registered as G-THOF stalled whilst on approach to Bournemouth from Faro.

== See also ==
- Bournemouth Aviation Museum – located at the airport from 1998 until 2008
