= List of defunct airlines of Cyprus =

This is a list of defunct airlines of Cyprus.

Airline	Image	IATA	ICAO	Callsign	Commenced operations	Ceased operations	Notes
Aerotrans Airlines		6F	PFO	AEROTRANS	1999	2002	
Air Fast			AFS		1986		
Air Venus					1971	1979	
AJet		ZU	AJY		2006	2006	
Avistar			KJA	AVISTAR	1990	1998	Operated Boeing 707
Capital L Airlines					1999	2003	
Cobalt Air		CO	FCB	APOLLO	2016	2018	
Cyprair Tours		CB	CYC	CYPRAIR	1971	1979	
Cyprus Airways		CY	CYP	CYPRUS	1948	2015	Went bankrupt
Eurocypria Airlines		UI	ECA	EUROCYPRIA	1992	2010	
FOS Logistics			SFB		2004	2006	
Freedom Airways			FAS		2004	2008	Operated Fokker F27
Helios Airways		ZU	HCY	HELIOS	2000	2006	Renamed Ajet Airways
Jenair			JEN		1992	1997	
Kibris Turk Hava Yollary Cyprus Turkish Airlines					1975	2010	Unofficial and unrecognized airline established in the Northern part of the island under Turkish occupation
Orion Airways			FOH	ORION	2015	2015	Failed project
SkyMiddleEast					2011	2011	Virtual carrier
TEA Cyprus			TEC	TEAK	1993	1997	Operated Boeing 737

== See also ==
- List of airlines of Cyprus
- List of airports in Cyprus
