= NRK (disambiguation) =

NRK is a Norwegian public broadcaster.

NRK may also refer to:

- Nik-related protein kinase gene
- Newark station, Delaware, Amtrak station code NRK
- Norrköping Airport, Sweden, IATA airport code NRK
- Northern Rock, British bank, London Stock Exchange ticker NRK
- KNRK (94-7 NRK), radio station in Portland, Oregon
- Ground Robotic Complex (Ukrainian: Наземний роботизований комплекс, "NRK"), a Ukrainian term for all unmanned ground vehicles (UGVs) and ground drones operated by special forces
