= Cobalt Air =

Cypriot airline

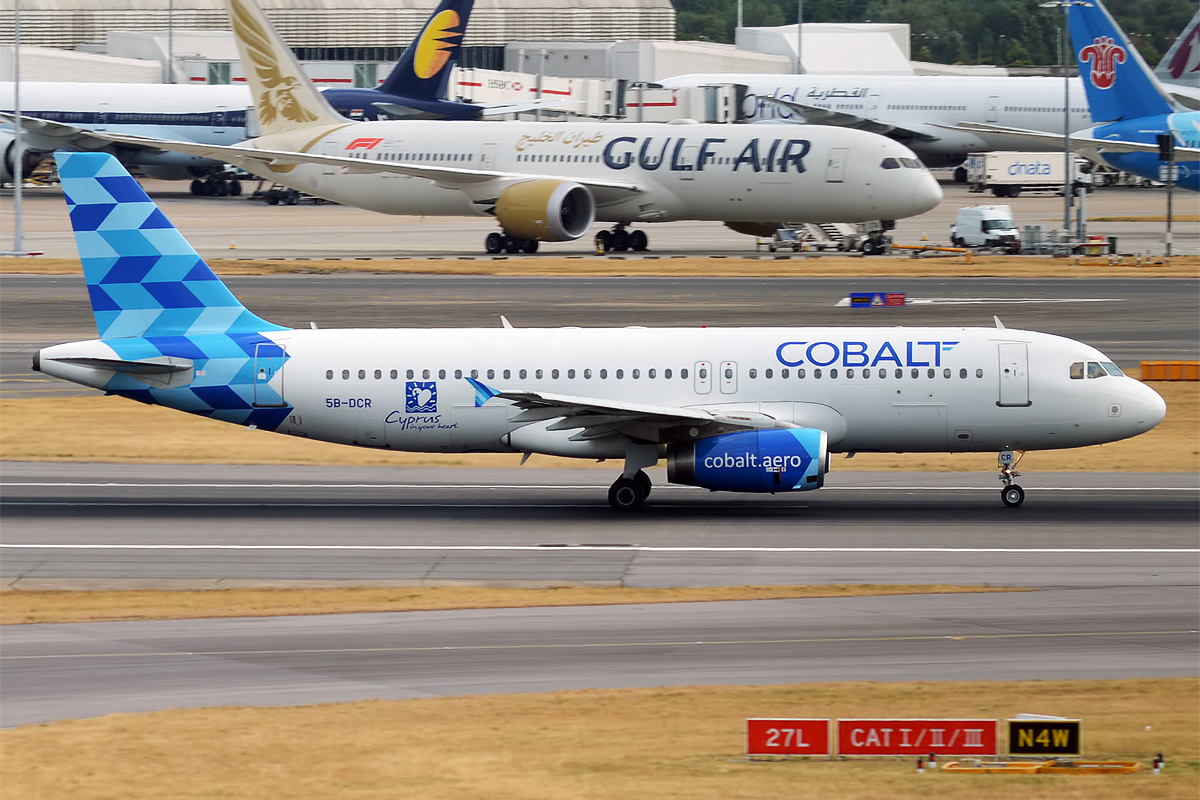
- Airbus A320-200
IATA	ICAO	Call sign
CO	FCB	APOLLO
- Founded: 27 November 2015
- Commenced operations: 1 June 2016
- Ceased operations: 17 October 2018
- Hubs: Larnaca International Airport
- Frequent-flyer program: Cobalt Elements
- Fleet size: 6
- Destinations: 23
- Headquarters: Nicosia, Cyprus
- Key people: Petros Souppouris (CEO); Guy Maclean (Accountable Manager)
- Employees: 350 approx (2017)
- Website: www.cobalt.aero

Cobalt Air was a Cypriot airline headquartered in Nicosia based out of Larnaca International Airport.

The airline operated its maiden flight on 1 June 2016 from Larnaca to Athens. It was the second Cypriot airline after Tus Airways to be established since the dissolution of flag carrier Cyprus Airways in January 2015. From June 2017 until October 2018, it was the second largest airline at Larnaca International Airport with 8.2% of weekly capacity after Aegean Airlines, and was predicted to become the largest airline by summer 2018 following expansion and the subsequent reduction by Aegean in Larnaca. However, Cobalt Air ceased all operations on 17 October 2018 facing financial difficulties.

== History ==
Cobalt Air was established in 2015. The first Airbus A320 aircraft arrived in April 2016 and the airline was granted an air operator's certificate (AOC) on 18 May 2016 following a test flight between Larnaca and Heraklion. According to chairman Gregory Diacou, Cobalt planned to receive another three aircraft of the same type by the end of June 2016. Following the successful completion of its maiden flight from Larnaca to Athens on June 1, Cobalt on 14 June 2016 began selling tickets from Larnaca on the Athens route as well as on 5 other new routes for the airline to Dublin, Heraklion, London–Stansted, Manchester and Thessaloniki.

On 4 March 2017, it was announced by the transport minister of Cyprus that Cobalt would operate the route from Paphos to Athens after Ryanair stopped operating the route in late March. In May 2017, the airline announced that it would add five rows of 'economy comfort seats' to its six aircraft, to be sold at an additional fee at the airport, or as business-class seats in a 2x2. A frequent flyer program was to be implemented. In August 2017, the airline announced plans to fit its fleet with onboard Wi-Fi available to passengers, part of a move from the airline's original low-cost approach to more of a full-service model.

In May 2018, the airline announced it would be using a portable wireless IFE platform called Bluebox Wow to introduce IFE across its fleet. In June 2018, Cobalt signed an agreement with Etihad Airways to allow passengers to check their bags through on connecting flights to destinations on the over 100 routes on the Etihad network. On 17 October 2018, Cobalt Airways suspended all operations indefinitely due to financial difficulties. The last flight to land was CO327 from London-Heathrow to Larnaca, which arrived at 00:10 local time on 18 October 2018.

On 2 November 2018, it was reported that A Cypriot Administrative Court had temporarily reinstated Cobalt's Air Transport License (ATL) after overturning an earlier Air Transport Licensing Authority (ATLA) decision to withdraw it. This was due to a request from Virgin Atlantic, who had leased London Heathrow slots to Cobalt and was in danger of losing them given the cancellation of Cobalt's operating licences. As such, in addition to saving the UK carrier's Heathrow slots, the formal reinstatement of Cobalt's ATL would allow the Cypriot carrier to continue its hunt for a Good Samaritan investor willing to revive its operations. On 5 November, the day of the court case, it was reported Virgin had withdrawn the legal bid against the airline. This led to the suspension of the airline's ATL for a second time.

== Destinations ==
As of February 2018, Cobalt Air flew to 23 destinations in 13 countries, all in Europe, Russia and the Middle East. Prior to the closure of the airline, several network expansions were planned. The airline's previous CEO, Andrew Madar, stated that an aircraft could be based at Paphos International Airport from winter 2017/18, operating flights to Birmingham, Brussels, Dublin and London–Stansted.

In August 2017, the airline announced two new routes from Larnaca to Frankfurt and London–Gatwick. The airline also announced its intention to launch operations to Moscow from Larnaca by the end of the year. It initially intended to launch the service to Moscow in summer 2017, but failed to complete the formalities on time, subsequently the route is planned to launch in late March 2018. The airline also stated its interest in operating to Saint Petersburg in the near future.

In March 2018, it was announced the airline would start a route from Athens to London-Gatwick, its first route to not originate from Cyprus, its home base.

Towards the end it began flying to Heathrow Airport in England too.

== Fleet ==
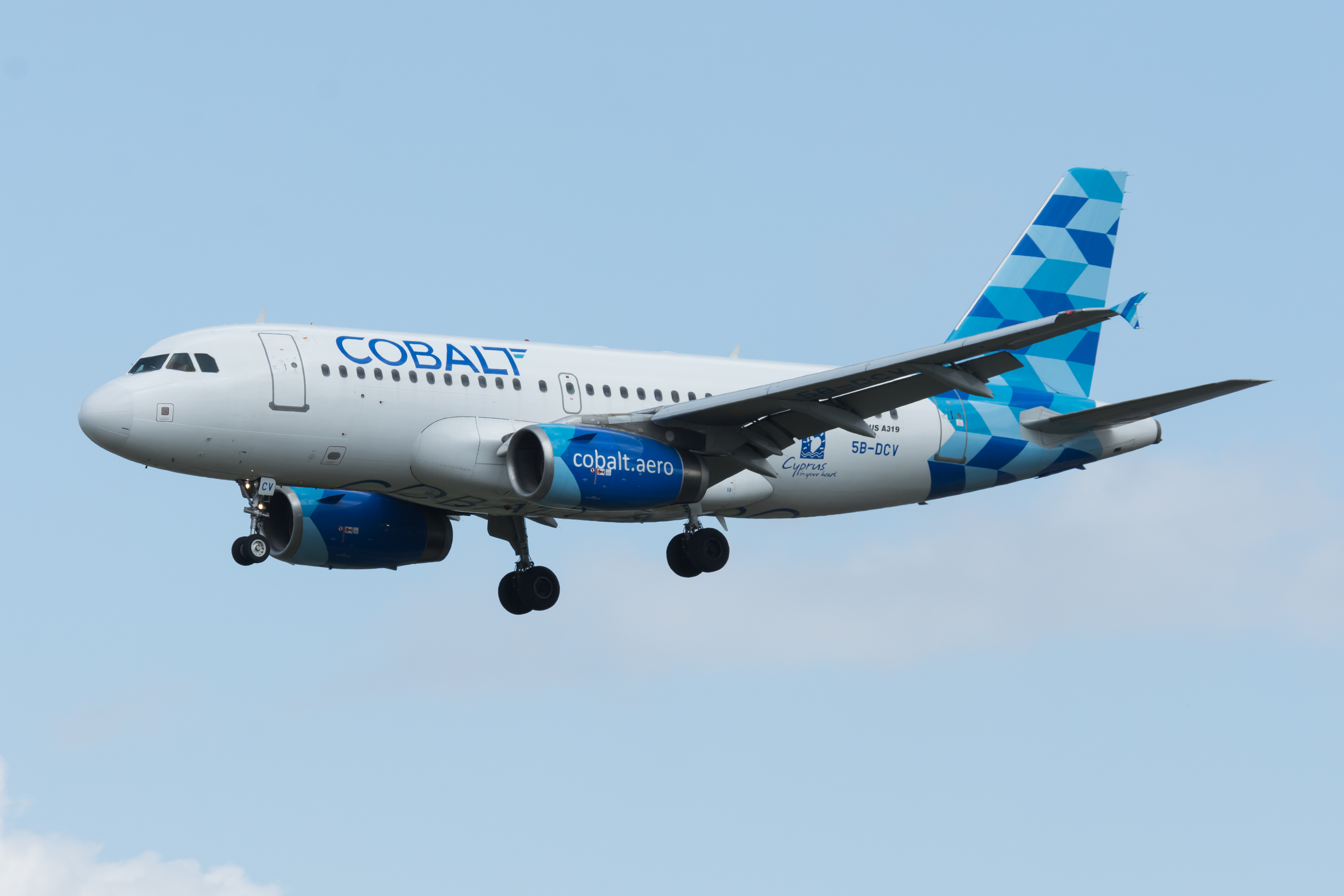
Cobalt Air Airbus A319-100

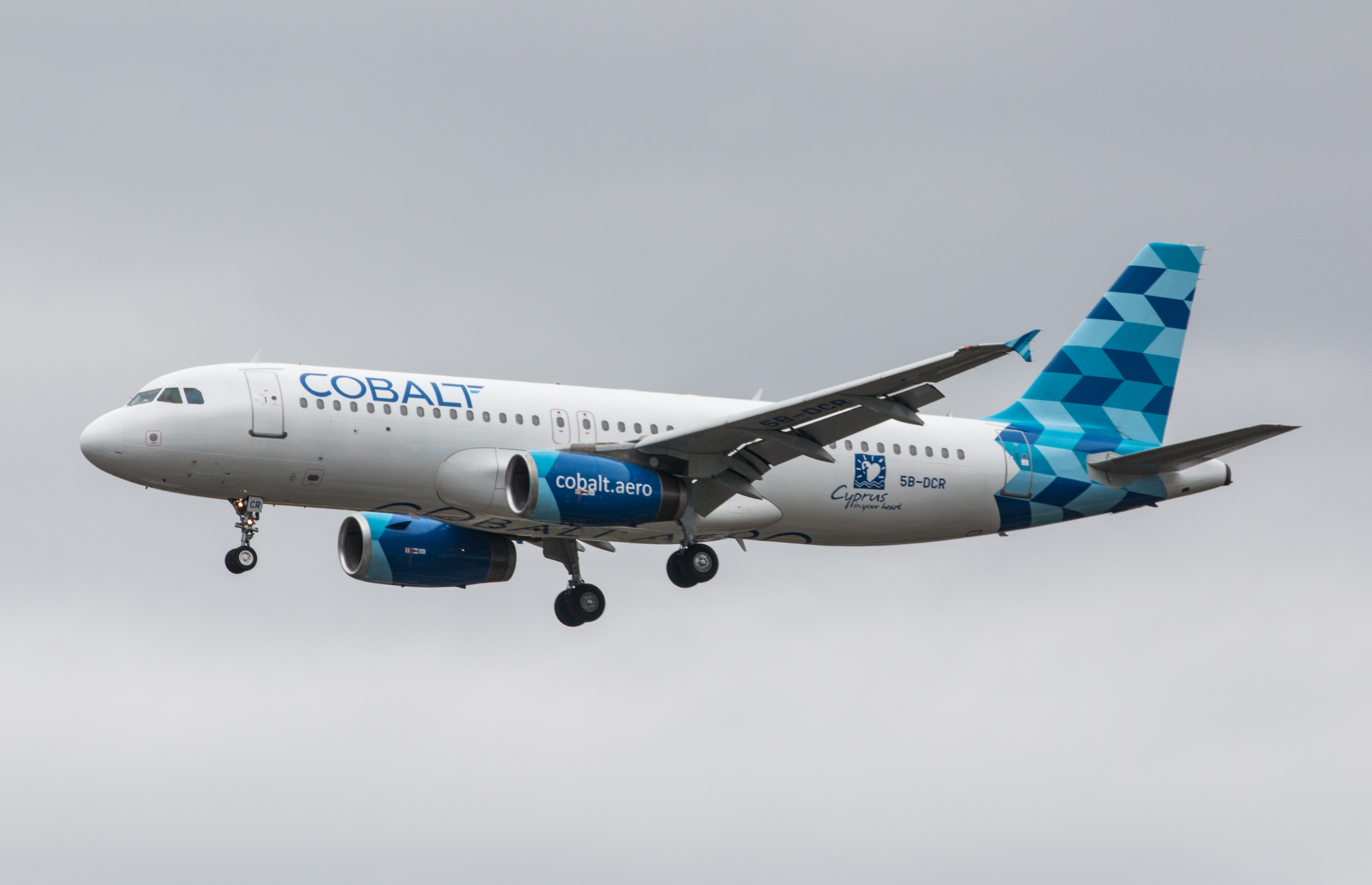
Cobalt Air Airbus A320-200

As of 30 June 2018, the Cobalt fleet consisted of the following aircraft:

Cobalt Air fleet
Aircraft	In service	Orders	Passengers			Notes
Aircraft	In service	Orders	C	Y	Total	Notes
Airbus A319-100	2	—	—	144	144	
Airbus A320-200	4	—	12	144	156	
Airbus A330-200	—	2	N/A	N/A	N/A	The airline was shut down and never received the aircraft
Total	6	2				

== Services ==
=== Aircraft cabins ===
Cobalt Air offered business class on selected routes operated by Airbus A320 aircraft but the airline's fleet of Airbus A319s did not feature the business class offering. Business class featured 12 large leather seats in a 2 by 2 configuration. Passengers were offered priority boarding, a dedicated check-in desk, spacious seating and an extensive dining menu that could be ordered at a time of customer's choice. In addition, Business Class passengers had access to a business class lounge. In economy class passengers are offered a Buy-on-board service.

=== In-flight entertainment ===
The airline offered in flight entertainment through a portable wireless IFE platform called Bluebox Wow. Bluebox Wow was a portable, lunchbox-sized unit. Each box's single, swappable and rechargeable battery could deliver up to 15 hours of streamed video content. Cobalt Air had specified three Bluebox Wow units per aircraft, which are secured in the overhead lockers.

=== Frequent flyer program ===
In September 2018, Cobalt Air launched a passenger recognition programme Cobalt Elements. The recognition card offered benefits including seat upgrades, fare discounts, priority check-in/boarding, increased baggage allowance, a dedicated support line and other incentives to frequent flyer members across the Cobalt network. Members received a Cobalt Elements black card and premium baggage tags. Elements vouchers could be used to upgrade flights. An annual membership included three complimentary upgrade vouchers from economy to business class. Additional upgrade vouchers could be purchased at a discount. Elements members also received a 10% discount on Cobalt's lowest fares.
