= Cyprus Airways =

Flag carrier of Cyprus

- Airbus A220-300
IATA	ICAO	Call sign
CY	CYP	CYPRUS
- Founded: 29 January 2016; 10 years ago
- Commenced operations: 1 June 2017; 9 years ago
- AOC #: CY-012
- Operating bases: Larnaca International Airport
- Fleet size: 6
- Destinations: 18
- Headquarters: Larnaca, Cyprus
- Key people: Vasilis Zertalis - Chairman Thanos Pascalis - CEO
- Employees: 220
- Website: cyprusairways.com

Cyprus Airways (Greek: Κυπριακές Αερογραμμές) is the flag carrier of Cyprus, based at Larnaca International Airport. It is the largest airline in Cyprus, connecting the island to Europe and the Middle East with a regional network of flights. The registered name of the company is Charlie Airlines Ltd. The airline's logo incorporates an olive branch, the main symbol of Cyprus.

== History ==
Start-up Cypriot air carrier Charlie Airlines was established in early 2016. It bid to the open government tender and won the rights to use Cyprus Airways trademark, logo, trading name and other such rights, for an initial period of 10 years. By March 2017 the company obtained its Air Operator Certificate (AOC) from the Cypriot Department of Civil Aviation. Scheduled operations were launched in June 2017, The airline operates under EASA regulations, maintains an IOSA certification as a full member of IATA, while is also a member of ERAA since 2025.

== Destinations ==
As of September 2025, Cyprus Airways is operating flights to the following airports:

Country	City	Airport	Notes	Refs
Cyprus	Larnaca	Larnaca International Airport	Hub	
Egypt	Cairo	Cairo International Airport	Starts 2027	
Egypt	Sharm El Sheikh	Sharm El Sheikh International Airport	Seasonal charter	
France	Paris	Charles de Gaulle Airport		
Germany	Munich	Munich Airport		
Greece	Athens	Athens International Airport		
Greece	Heraklion	Heraklion International Airport		
Greece	Preveza	Aktion National Airport	Seasonal	
Greece	Rhodes	Rhodes International Airport	Seasonal	
Greece	Santorini	Santorini International Airport	Seasonal	
Greece	Skiathos	Skiathos International Airport	Seasonal	
Israel	Tel Aviv	Ben Gurion Airport		
Italy	Milan	Milan Malpensa Airport		
Italy	Rome	Rome Fumicino Airport		
Italy	Venice	Venice Marco Polo Airport	Seasonal	
Lebanon	Beirut	Beirut–Rafic Hariri International Airport		
Romania	Craiova	Craiova International Airport	Seasonal charter	
Romania	Sibiu	Sibiu International Airport	Seasonal charter	
Slovakia	Košice	Košice International Airport	Seasonal charter	
Slovakia	Piešťany	Piešťany Airport	Seasonal charter	
Spain	Barcelona	Josep Tarradellas Barcelona–El Prat Airport		
United Arab Emirates	Dubai	Dubai International Airport		
United Kingdom	London	London Stansted Airport	Starts April 2027	

== Code-share and Interline agreements ==
Cyprus Airways maintains a code-share agreement with Air France on its Paris service, as well as interline agreements with the following airlines:

- Air France
- Air India
- Bulgaria Air
- flyDubai
- Qatar Airways
- Sky Express

== Fleet ==
As of July 2026, Cyprus Airways operates an all-Airbus fleet composed of the following aircraft:

Cyprus Airways fleet
Aircraft	In service	Orders	Passengers		
Aircraft	In service	Orders	J	Y	Total
Airbus A220-300	4	-	12	110	122
Airbus A220-300	4	-	8	130	138
Airbus A320ceo	2	-	-	180	180
Airbus A320neo	0	2 + 2	8	168	174
Total	6	4			

== See also ==
- List of airlines of Cyprus
