= List of airlines of Cyprus =

This is a list of airlines which have an Air Operator Certificate issued by the Civil Aviation Authority of Cyprus.

== Scheduled airlines ==
Airline	ICAO	IATA	Callsign	Image	Commenced operations	Notes
Cyprus Airways	CYP	CY	CYPRUS		2017	Charlie Airlines trading name Flag carrier
Euroavia Airlines	SEB	M8	EURO AVIA		2024	Cargo airline
Tus Airways	CYF	U8	TUS AIR		2016	

== See also ==
- List of airlines
- List of defunct airlines of Cyprus
- List of defunct airlines of Europe
