= Eurocypria Airlines =

Cypriot charter airline

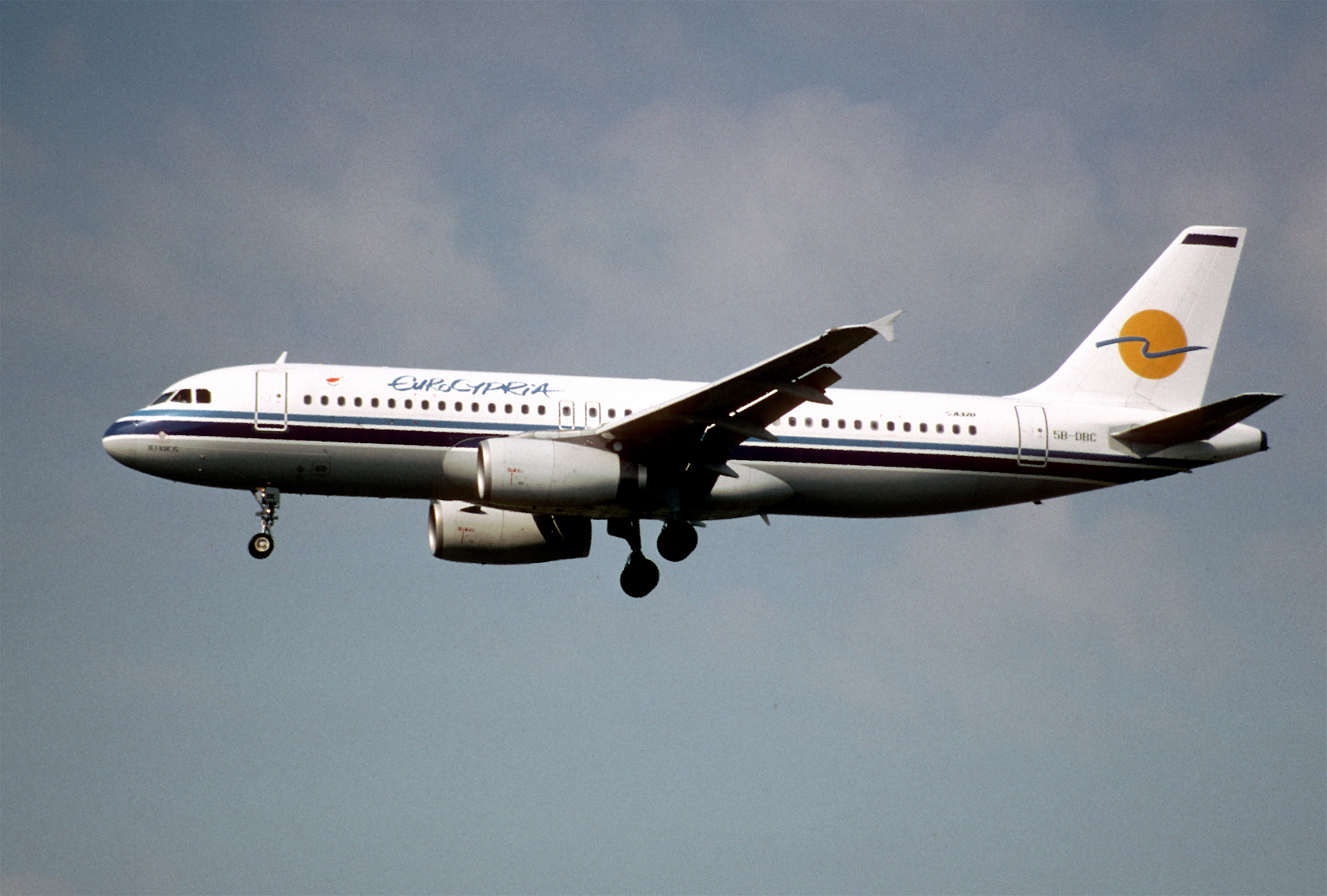
- Airbus A320
IATA	ICAO	Call sign
UI	ECA	EUROCYPRIA
- Founded: 25 March 1992
- Commenced operations: 12 June 1992
- Ceased operations: 4 November 2010
- Operating bases: Larnaca International Airport; Paphos International Airport
- Fleet size: 6
- Destinations: 72 (11 scheduled)
- Headquarters: Larnaca, Cyprus
- Website: www.eurocypria.com

Eurocypria Airlines Limited was a charter airline with its head office in the Artemis Building in Larnaca, Cyprus, owned by the government of Cyprus, operating mostly chartered flights. Its main base was Larnaca International Airport, with a secondary base at Paphos International Airport. On 4 November 2010 it was announced that the airline would file for bankruptcy and cease all flights by 13 November. All flights were suspended by decision of the Board of Directors on 4 November 2010.

== History ==
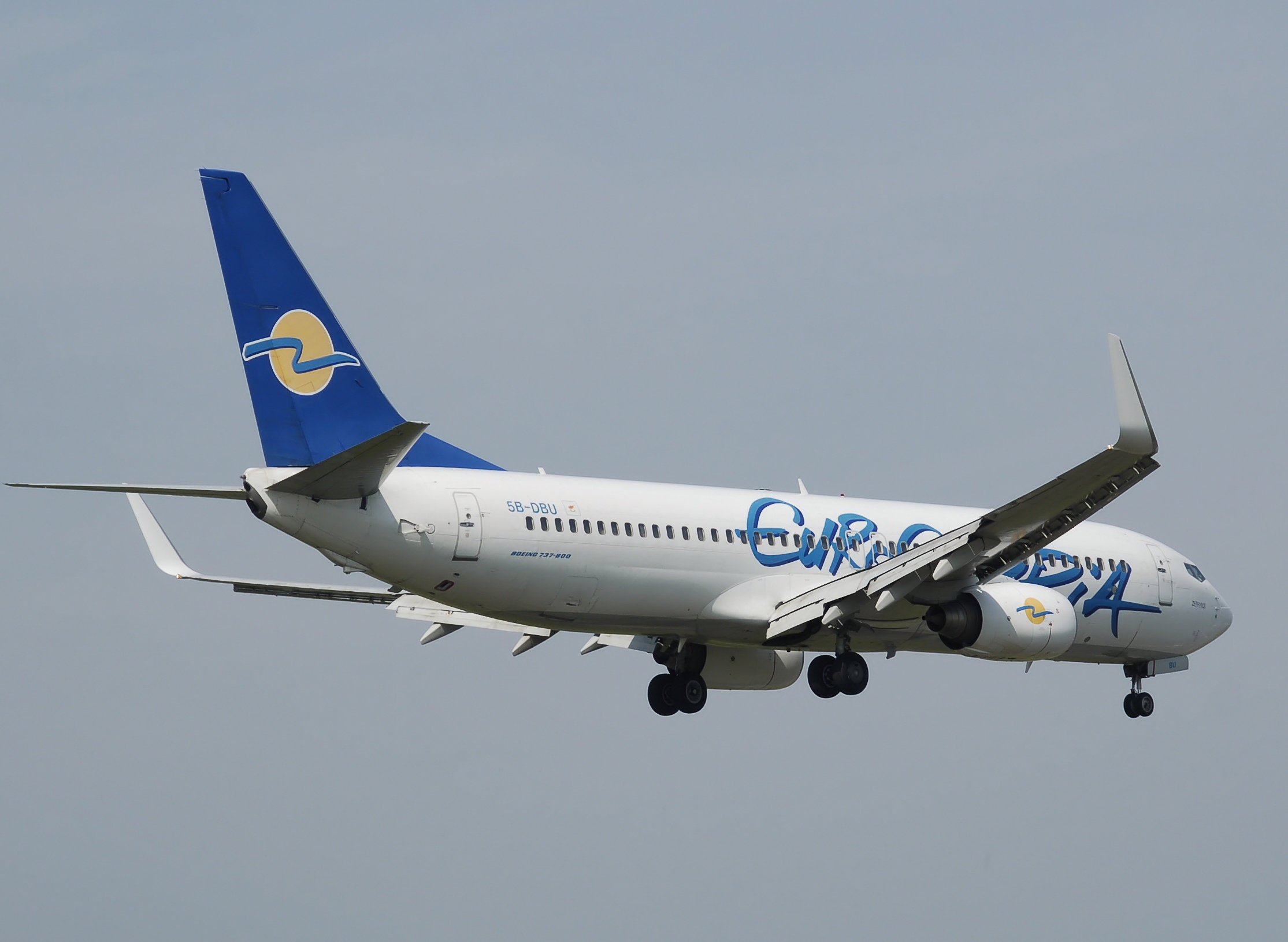
Boeing 737-800, named "Zephyros", 2008

Eurocypria was established on 25 March 1992 as a wholly owned subsidiary of Cyprus Airways, as the first Cyprus based charter airline. Operations began on 12 June 1992 with two new Airbus A320 aircraft. Two more were added later. Since 2001, the airline has operated scheduled services from Cyprus, and charter flights.

== Bailout ==
It was announced on 19 February 2010 that the Cyprus Government would inject €35m into Eurocypria's capitalization, to enable the airline to pay off €28m of owed debt and invest in the airline's future. Cyprus Airways stated Eurocypria should shut down as "a small island cannot withstand two state-owned airlines and if they're not shut down, we might both go bust", but the government declined this prospect and the House of Representatives went ahead with the bailout.

Yet the approval of the cash injection for Eurocypria was, as the 'Cyprus Mail' reported on 19 February 2010, "unlikely to be the final word". Anastasios Antoniou LLC, a Law Firm based in Limassol, filed an official complaint on 17 February 2010 with the European Commission regarding the proposed financing of Eurocypria on behalf of a client who wished to remain anonymous. As national daily 'Phileleftheros' reported on 19 February 2010 - based on its own sources - the complainant could be a competitor in the relevant market that has unsuccessfully attempted to enter the market. In a statement issued on 19 February 2010 in response to the media commentary, Anastasios Antoniou LLC explained that the capital injection on the part of the Republic of Cyprus is likely to be in violation of the applicable EU legislation regarding State Aid. The Firm pursued its complaint before the European Commission further in the following months, also filing a request for interim measures on behalf of the Commission pursuant to the provisions of Council Regulation (EC) No 659/1999.

In June 2010, it was unveiled that two reports, prepared in February 2010 before the capital injection had been approved, were opposed to the bailout. Made public by Finance Minister Charilaos Stavrakis on 10 June 2010, the two reports created a series of debates and rows with the island's political parties, who felt they were misled into approving the money. The first report, carried out by the Accountant-general on February 3, proposed a strict implementation of Eurocypria's business plan to reinforce its profit-making abilities. Meanwhile, it was proposed that a strategic investor be found. Failure to do so by mid-2010, it added, would lead to Eurocypria going bankrupt, in combination with some of its human and material resources being absorbed by national carrier Cyprus Airways. According to the Accountant-general, this would reduce the cost of bankruptcy from €84 million to €55 million. The second report - carried out by technocrats at the Finance Ministry and Planning Office – contradicted Finance Minister Charilaos Stavrakis’ claims that the reports had nothing to do with the €35 million injection, as its conclusions were centred on the specific fund.

In September 2010, Minister of Finance Mr Stavrakis announced that a possible merge of operations between Cyprus Airways and Eurocypria Airlines was under consideration, in an attempt to staunch losses. These considerations were geared, after the disclosure of the 1H2010 troubled financial results of Cyprus Airways Ltd, in which the Government is the major shareholder. European Union rejected this possibility, and Eurocypria ceased operations in November 2010.

== Destinations ==
All flights were suspended on 4 November 2010 and the company entered liquidation by decision of the board of directors.

== Fleet ==
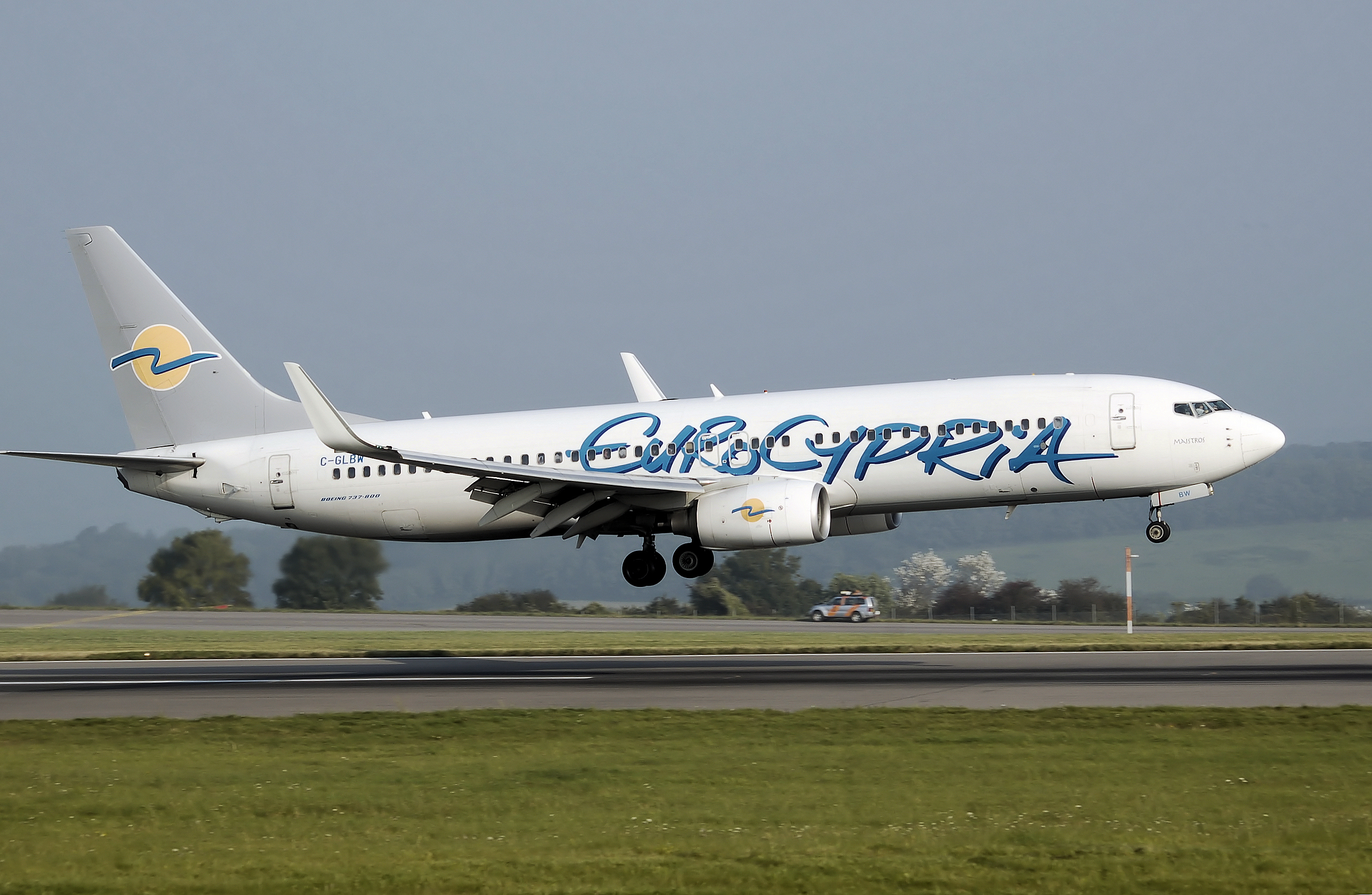
Boeing 737-800, named "Maistros", landing at Bristol Airport in 2008

Eurocypria Airlines fleet consisted of the following aircraft as at 1 November 2010:

Eurocypria fleet
Aircraft	In fleet	Passengers	Names	Notes
Boeing 737-800(WL)	6	189	Eypos, Zephyros, Levantes, Grecos, Notos, Maistros	1 leased from Sunwing Airlines

Eurocypria also operated 5 Airbus A320-200.

Eurocypria's aircraft were named after a wind and each featured a differently colored tailfin.

On 3 September 2010, Eurocypria pilots went on strike due to the government's proposal of reducing Eurocypria's fleet to 4 aircraft in 2011. Finally, all operations ceased on 4 November 2010.
