= Euroavia Airlines =

Cypriot airline

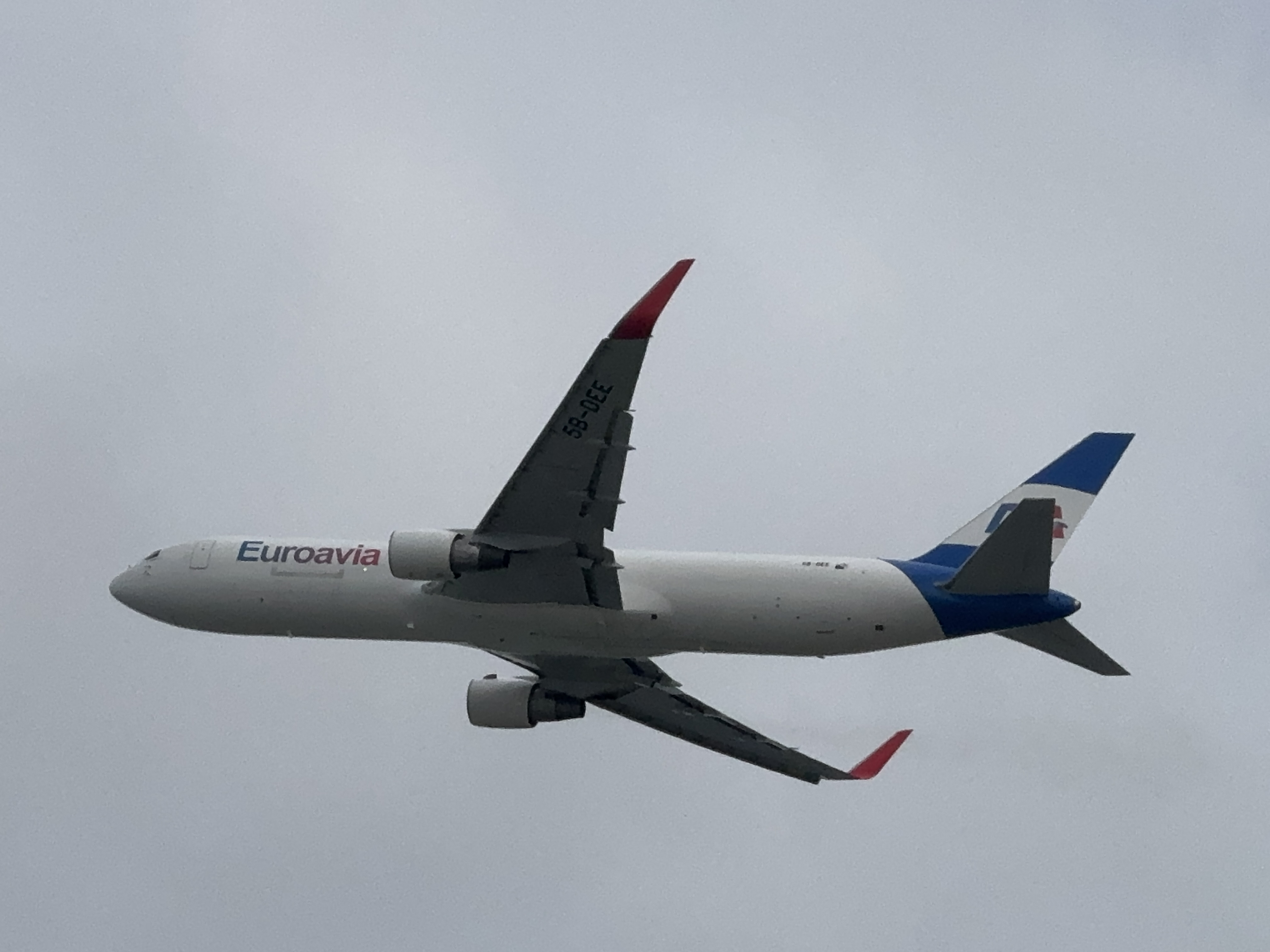
- Boeing 767-300ER(BDSF)
IATA	ICAO	Call sign
M8*	SEB	EURO AVIA
- Founded: 25 April 2024
- Commenced operations: December 2024
- Operating bases: Larnaca International Airport
- Fleet size: 1
- Headquarters: Latsia, Cyprus
- Key people: Chuanning Zhu (Co-Chairman), Theodoris Karabatis (Co-Chairman)
- Website: www.euroaviaairlines.com

Euroavia Airlines is a cargo airline headquartered in Latsia, Cyprus. Founded in April 2024, the airline's primary hub is located at Larnaca International Airport. The airline offers freight services to various destinations across Europe, Africa, and Asia.

== History ==
Euroavia Airlines was established and started operations in 2024 after receiving its first aircraft, a Boeing 767-300 freighter from Air Transport Services Group. The aircraft was delivered in October 2024. The airline began revenue operations in December 2024.

== Fleet ==
=== Current fleet ===
As of July 2026, Euroavia Airlines operates the following aircraft:

Aircraft	In service	Orders	Total
Boeing 767-300ER(BDSF)	1	-	1

The Boeing 767-300ER(BDSF), registered as 5B-DEE (c/n 26991) and based in Larnaca, was 32 years old, having first entered service with Condor in 1992. It was leased to Thomas Cook Airlines from 2002 to 2004 before returning to Condor. In June 2023, it was sold to Air Transport Services Group, and in May 2024, it underwent a Bedek Special Freighter conversion to join their Cargo Aircraft Management division (CAM).

=== Former fleet ===
As of August 2025, Euroavia Airlines operated 1 Boeing 767-300ER(BDSF)

== See also ==
- List of airlines of Cyprus
- List of cargo airlines
