= Aerotrans Airlines =

Cypriot airline

IATA	ICAO	Call sign
6F	PFO	AEROTRANS
- Founded: 1999
- Ceased operations: 2002
- Operating bases: Larnaca International Airport
- Fleet size: 1 – BAC 1-11

Aerotrans Airlines was an airline from Cyprus. It was operational from 1999 to 2002.
