= Norrköping Airport =

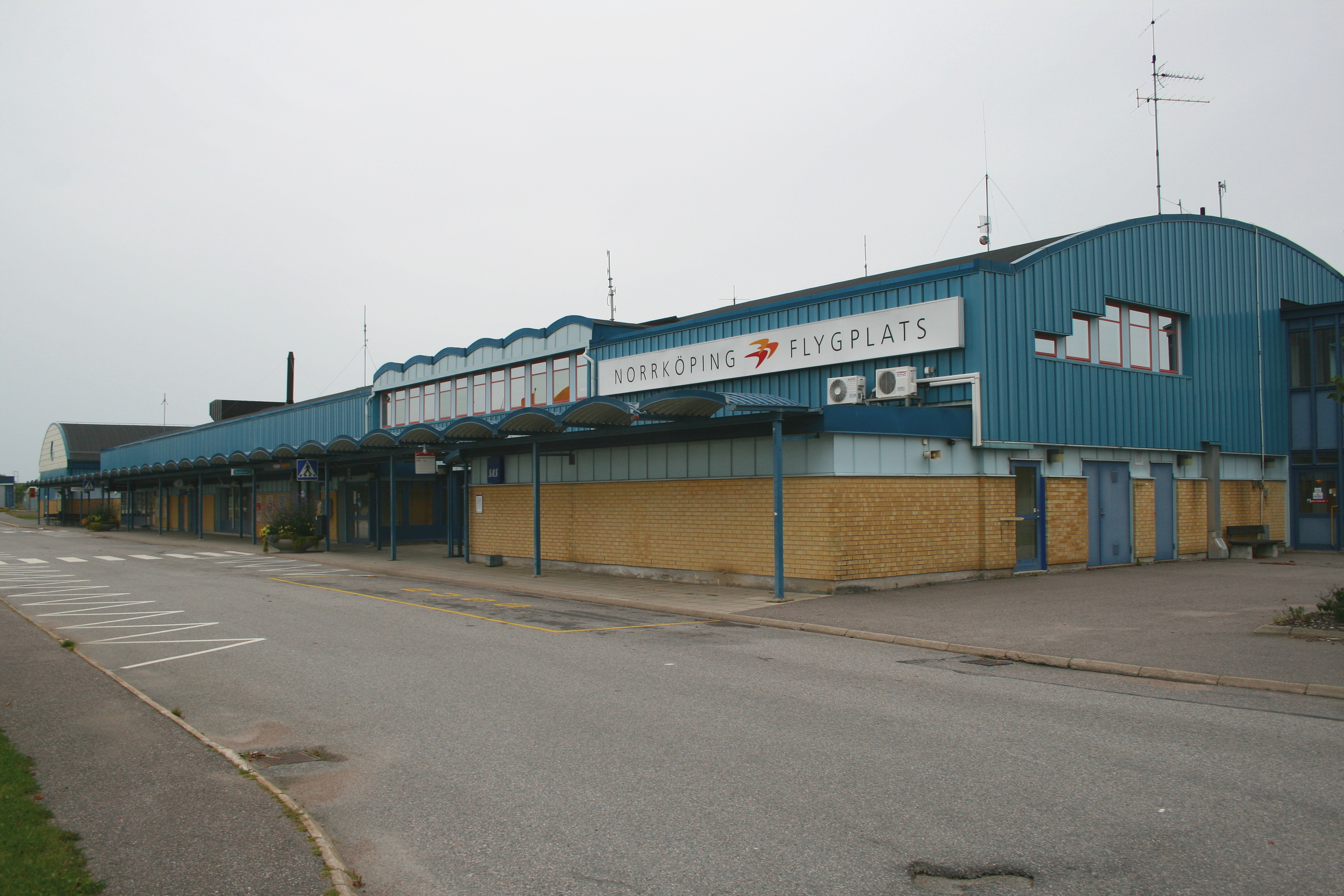
- IATA: NRK; ICAO: ESSP

Summary
- Airport type: Public
- Operator: Norrköping Municipality
- Location: Norrköping
- Elevation AMSL: 32 ft / 10 m
- Coordinates: 58°35′10″N 016°13′54″E

Map
- Location of airport in Sweden

Runways
Direction	Length		Surface
Direction	ft	m	Surface
09/27	7,228	2,203	Asphalt

Statistics (2019)
- Passengers total: 103,298
- Aircraft movements: 4,617

Norrköping Airport (IATA: NRK, ICAO: ESSP) is an airport situated around 3 kilometres (1.9 mi) from the city center of Norrköping, Sweden. In 2019, it saw 103,298 passengers.

== History ==
The airport was founded in 1934. It had the highest number of passengers in the 1980s, and has declined since. The connection to Stockholm was closed down in 2001 because of improvements in highway connections to Stockholm, and train connection to Arlanda (so passengers planning to fly from Arlanda could use the train instead of an expensive air connection). As of mid-February 2019, flybmi was the only airline offering regularly scheduled flight services to and from the airport; this service ended on 16 February 2019, when flybmi ceased all of its operations after it filed for administration.

== Airlines and destinations ==
The following airlines operate regular scheduled and charter flights at Norrköping Airport:

Airlines	Destinations
Pegasus Airlines	Seasonal: Antalya
TUI fly Nordic	Seasonal charter: Chania, Gran Canaria, Larnaca, Palma de Mallorca, Rhodes, Split

== See also ==
- List of the largest airports in the Nordic countries
