= TUS Airways =

Cypriot airline

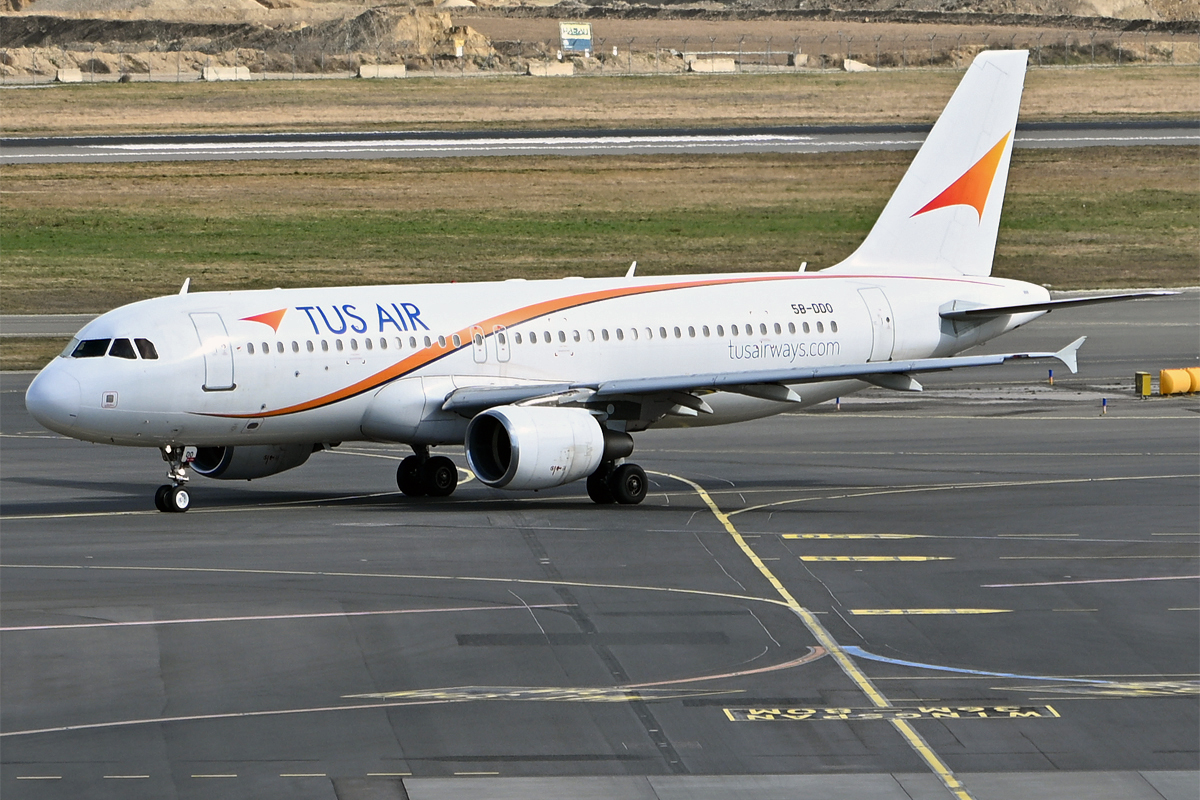
- Airbus A320-200
IATA	ICAO	Call sign
U8	CYF	TUS AIR
- Founded: June 2015; 11 years ago
- Commenced operations: 14 February 2016; 10 years ago
- Hubs: Larnaca International Airport
- Focus cities: Ben Gurion Airport
- Fleet size: 5
- Destinations: 25
- Headquarters: Larnaca, Cyprus
- Key people: Kenneth Woolley; Michael Weinstein; Tami Mosez-Borovitz
- Founders: Michael Weinstein; Kenneth Woolley
- Website: tusairways.com

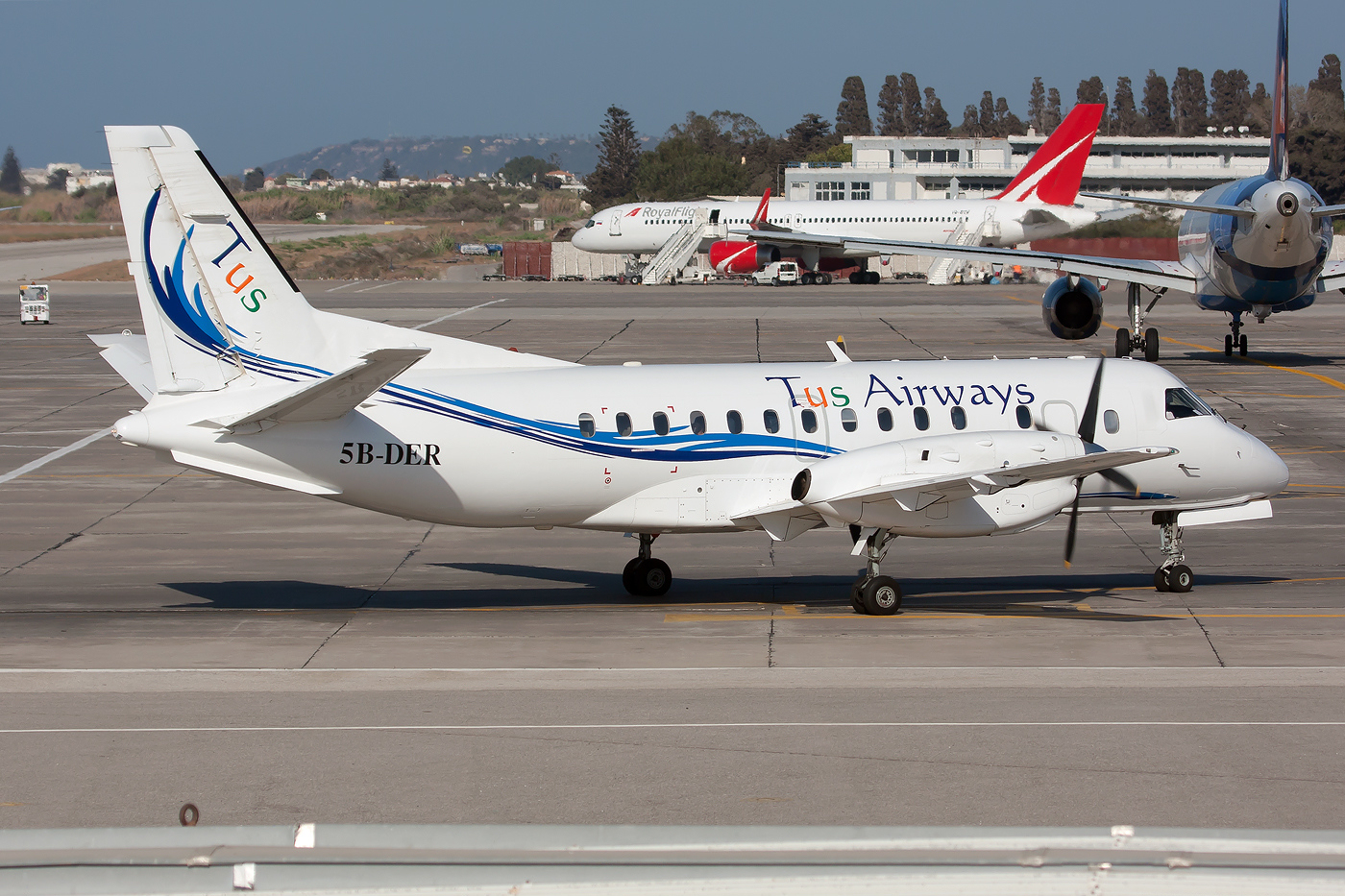
Saab 340B at Rhodes Island airport

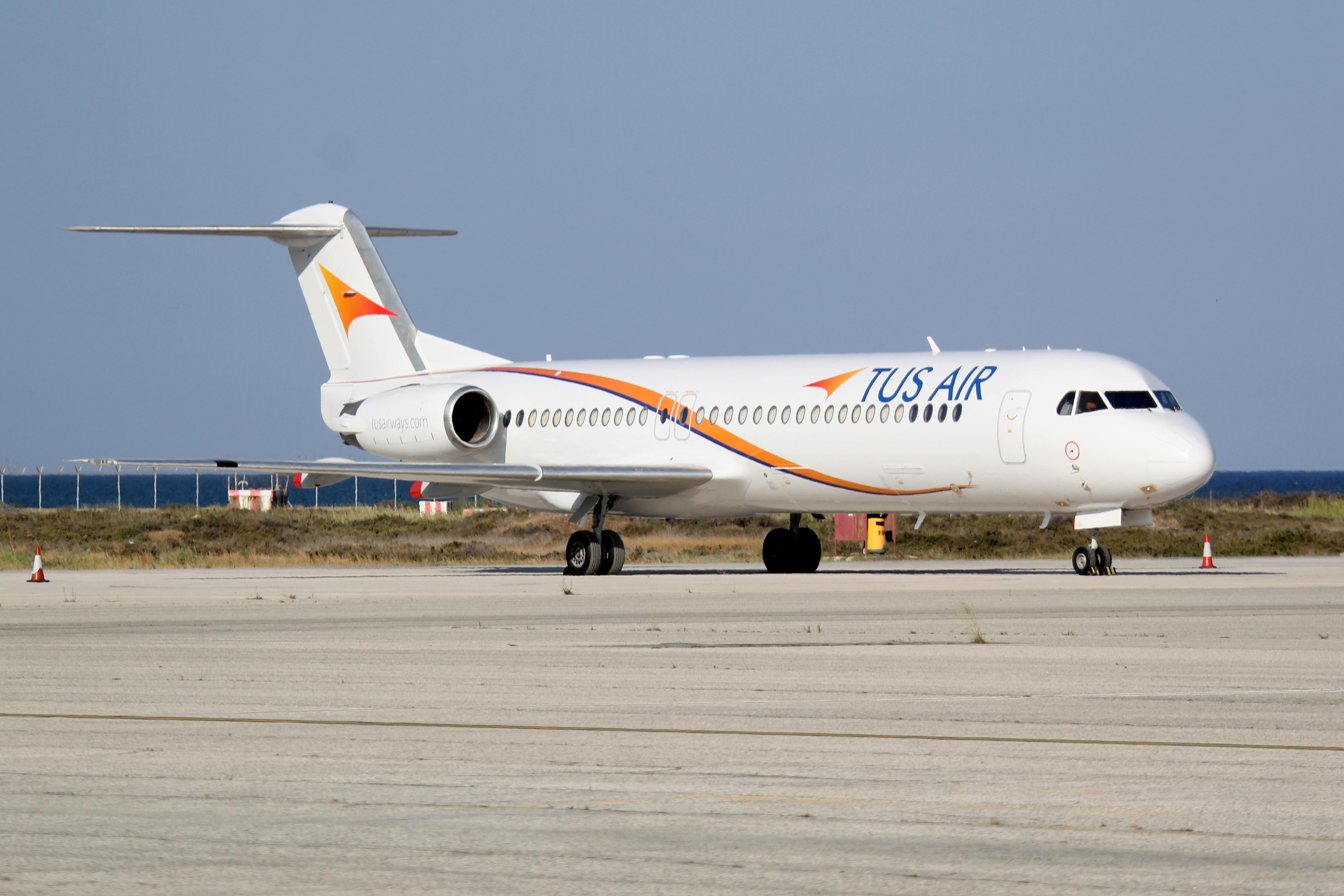
Fokker 100

TUS Airways is a Cypriot airline headquartered in Larnaca with its main hub at Larnaca International Airport. The airline was established in June 2015 and commenced flight operations on 14 February 2016.

== History ==
TUS Airways was founded in June 2015 by Israeli aviation executive Michael "Miki" Weinstein, backed by investors from Europe and the United States. Its name is an acronym of The Ultimate Schedule and was the first Cypriot airline to be founded following the dissolution of Cyprus Airways in January 2015. TUS Airways began operations on 14 February 2016 with a Saab 340B, flying from Larnaca to Tel Aviv and Haifa in Israel. In July 2016, the airline received its first Saab 2000 to increase capacity. In June 2017, the airline acquired its first jet aircraft, two Fokker 100s. It subsequently bought five Fokker 70s, bringing the total number of aircraft to seven.

In September 2019, media reported that TUS Airways would cease operations by the 30th. However, Chief Executive Andrew Pyne—who had replaced founding CEO Michael Weinstein earlier that year—issued a statement clarifying that the airline was only pausing most scheduled flights to restructure and renew its fleet. For a while Ela Airways was suggested to be the new name but it did not happen. Weinstein returned to the helm in January 2021, relaunching the carrier under a hybrid business model centered on an all-Airbus A320 fleet. By 2023, TUS Airways had become the largest Cypriot airline by fleet size, with five A320-200 aircraft serving scheduled and charter routes from Larnaca and Paphos.

== Destinations ==
As of June 2023, TUS Airways operates scheduled flights from its hubs in Larnaca and Paphos, as well as Tel Aviv.

Country	City	Airport	Notes	Refs
Austria	Vienna	Vienna Airport		
Bulgaria	Sofia	Sofia Airport		
Cyprus	Larnaca	Larnaca International Airport	Hub	
Cyprus	Paphos	Paphos International Airport	Hub	
Czech Republic	Prague	Václav Havel Airport Prague		
France	Paris	Charles de Gaulle Airport		
Germany	Düsseldorf	Düsseldorf Airport		
Greece	Athens	Athens International Airport		
Greece	Chania	Chania International Airport	Seasonal	
Greece	Corfu	Corfu International Airport	Seasonal	
Greece	Heraklion	Heraklion International Airport		
Greece	Kefalonia	Kefalonia International Airport	Seasonal	
Greece	Preveza/Lefkada	Aktion National Airport	Seasonal	
Greece	Rhodes	Rhodes International Airport	Seasonal	
Israel	Haifa	Haifa Airport	Terminated	
Israel	Tel Aviv	Ben Gurion Airport	Focus city	
Italy	Bergamo	Milan Bergamo Airport		
Italy	Naples	Naples International Airport		
Italy	Rome	Leonardo da Vinci–Fiumicino Airport		
Jordan	Amman	Queen Alia International Airport	Seasonal	
Qatar	Doha	Hamad International Airport	Terminated	
Slovakia	Bratislava	M. R. Štefánik Airport	Seasonal	
Slovakia	Košice	Košice Airport	Seasonal	
Spain	Barcelona	Josep Tarradellas Barcelona–El Prat Airport		
United Arab Emirates	Dubai	Dubai International Airport		

== Fleet ==
=== Current fleet ===
As of July 2026, the TUS Airways fleet consists of the following aircraft:

TUS Airways fleet
Aircraft	In service	Orders	Passengers	Notes
Airbus A320	5	—	180	
Total	5	—		

=== Former fleet ===
As of August 2025, TUS Airways fleet operated 5 Airbus A320.

Tus Air used to operate the following aircraft:

- 3 further Airbus A320-200's
- 4 Fokker 70's
- 2 Fokker 100's

== See also ==
- List of airlines of Cyprus
- Transport in Cyprus
