= Sibiu International Airport =

Airport

Sibiu International Airport Aeroportul Internațional Sibiu
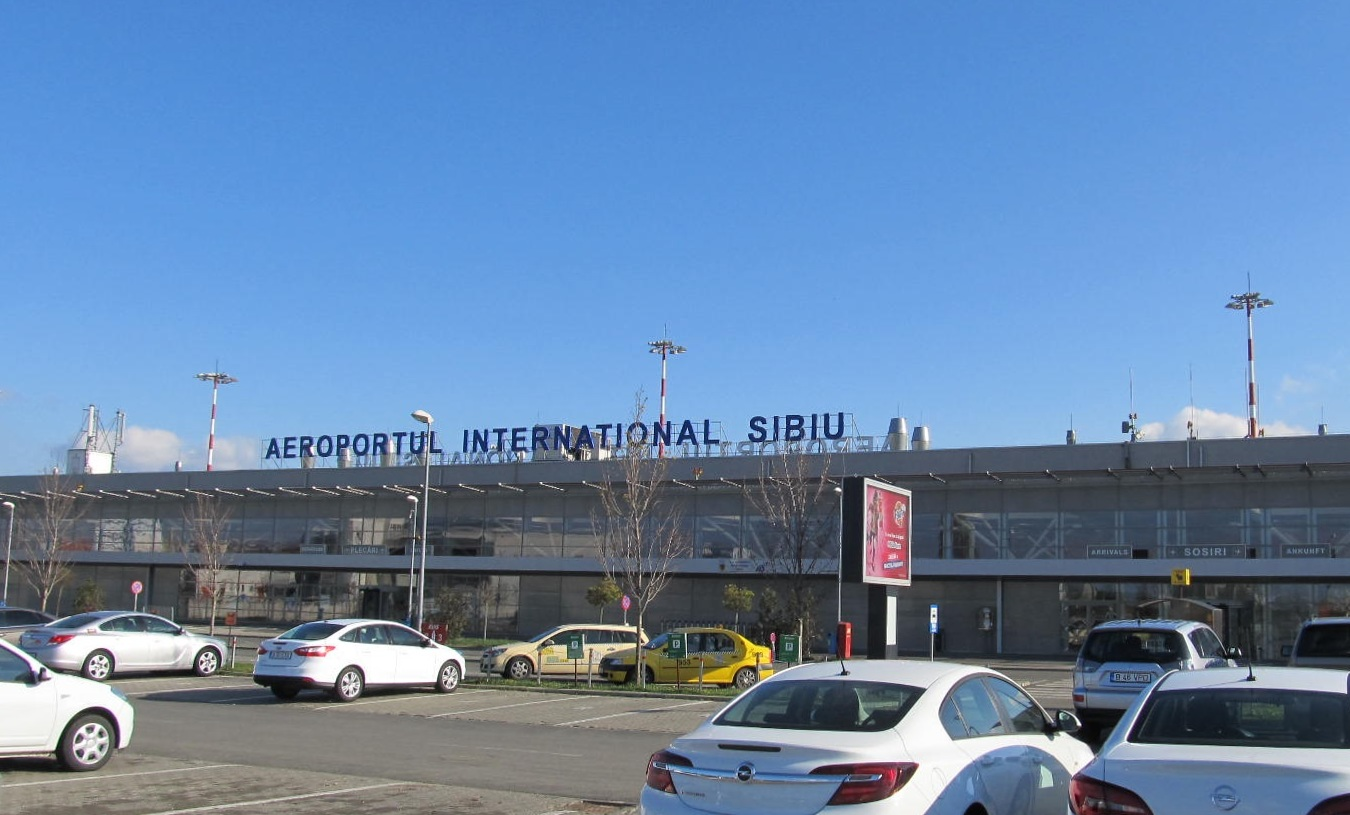
- IATA: SBZ; ICAO: LRSB

Summary
- Airport type: Public
- Operator: Sibiu County Council
- Serves: Sibiu, Romania
- Opened: 1943
- Focus city for: Wizz Air, Lufthansa
- Elevation AMSL: 1,520 ft (460 m)
- Coordinates: 45°47′09″N 024°05′08″E
- Website: sibiuairport.ro

Map
- Location of airport in Romania

Runways
Direction	Length		Surface
Direction	m	ft	Surface
09/27	2,630	8,629	Concrete

Statistics (2025)
- Passengers: 694,805 ▲
- Aircraft movements: 7,733 ▲
- Source: AIP at the Romanian Airports Association (RAA)

Sibiu International Airport (Romanian: Aeroportul Internațional Sibiu) (IATA: SBZ, ICAO: LRSB) serves the city of Sibiu. It is located in southern Transylvania, 3 km (1.9 mi) west of Sibiu and about 260 km (160 mi) northwest of Romania's capital city, Bucharest.

== History ==
=== Foundation and early years ===
In 1943, the flying activities have been developed on a field (with grass) of 174 ha surface. The Lockheed operating planes belonged to the first Romanian operating airline - LARES. The first routes were Bucharest – Sibiu – Arad and Bucharest – Sibiu – Oradea. In 1944, Sibiu was connected by air with some other cities like Bucharest, Brasov, Deva, Oradea and Targu-Mures. In 1959, it was inaugurated the airport building with two floors, a control tower, a waiting room for 50 passengers on each way (embarking and debarking) and a store-room.

In 1970, the airport was capable to operate during the night, due to the approach and runway guiding lights that have been installed. The concrete runway was 2000m long and 30m wide. In 1975, radar facilities became operational and later in 1992, the airport was opened for international traffic, with flights to Stuttgart and Munich.

In 2006 - 2008, the airport passed through the most important rehabilitation program in its history, a €77 million investment in a new terminal building and in runway upgrade.

=== Development since 2010 ===
In 2013, Sibiu International Airport handled 189,300 passengers, which represents an increase over the previous year, while in 2014 the number of passengers increased to almost 216,000 and two new destinations to London and Dortmund have been introduced. In 2015, the total traffic grew up to 276,533 embarked-disembarked passengers, while the number of aircraft movements increased to 5,468.

In December 2016, Lufthansa announced its plans to increase operations on Munich – Sibiu route, as the airline scheduled up to 19 weekly flights from 26 March 2017. The airline operates this route with CityLine CRJ900 aircraft.

In November 2017, Wizz Air, announced that it will further expand its Sibiu operations, adding a second Airbus A320 aircraft to its local fleet in June 2018. At the same time, WIZZ will launch five long-awaited routes from Sibiu and increase frequencies on four popular services adding a total of 21 incremental flights to its schedule. Together with the new connections to Copenhagen, Charleroi, Paris Beauvais, Basel and Frankfurt Hahn, starting in June 2018, Sibiu's low fare network will be expanded to a total of 11 routes to 8 countries. The additional aircraft will also allow WIZZ to increase the frequency of flights on four services from summer 2018: London-Luton route will become daily; Memmingen Munich and Dortmund flights will increase to five, while the connection to Nuremberg will be operated four times per week.

In February 2023 the airport tripled its capacity and terminal size by modernizing and expanding the old terminal.

Since the airport had completed its expansion, making the terminal 3x as big, Wizz Air and Lufthansa have slowly increased presence on the local Airport. Lufthansa currently offers daily flights to Munich three times per day, and plans to bring new, bigger airplanes at the airport from October 2025. Wizz air has slowly expanded its route network from Sibiu, with flights to: Hamburg, Frankfurt, Vienna, Madrid, Rome, Basel from August 2025 and Birmingham from October 2025, while also increasing the frequency on the following routes: Memmingen(4/week->daily), Dortmund(2/week->4/week), Nuremberg(3/week->4/week), Karlsruhe Baded-Baden(3/week->4/week). While Austrian Airlines hasn't made any big changes at Sibiu International presence, it has quietly increased the frequency on the Sibiu-Vienna route, from 3 weekly flights to daily connections.

== Airlines and destinations ==
The following airlines operate regular scheduled and charter flights at Sibiu Airport:

Airlines	Destinations
Austrian Airlines	Vienna
Cyprus Airways	Seasonal charter: Larnaca
Sky Express	Seasonal charter: Heraklion, Rhodes
Wizz Air	Dortmund, Hamburg (ends 28 June 2026), Karlsruhe/Baden-Baden, London–Luton, Madrid, Memmingen, Nuremberg, Rome–Fiumicino

== Statistics ==
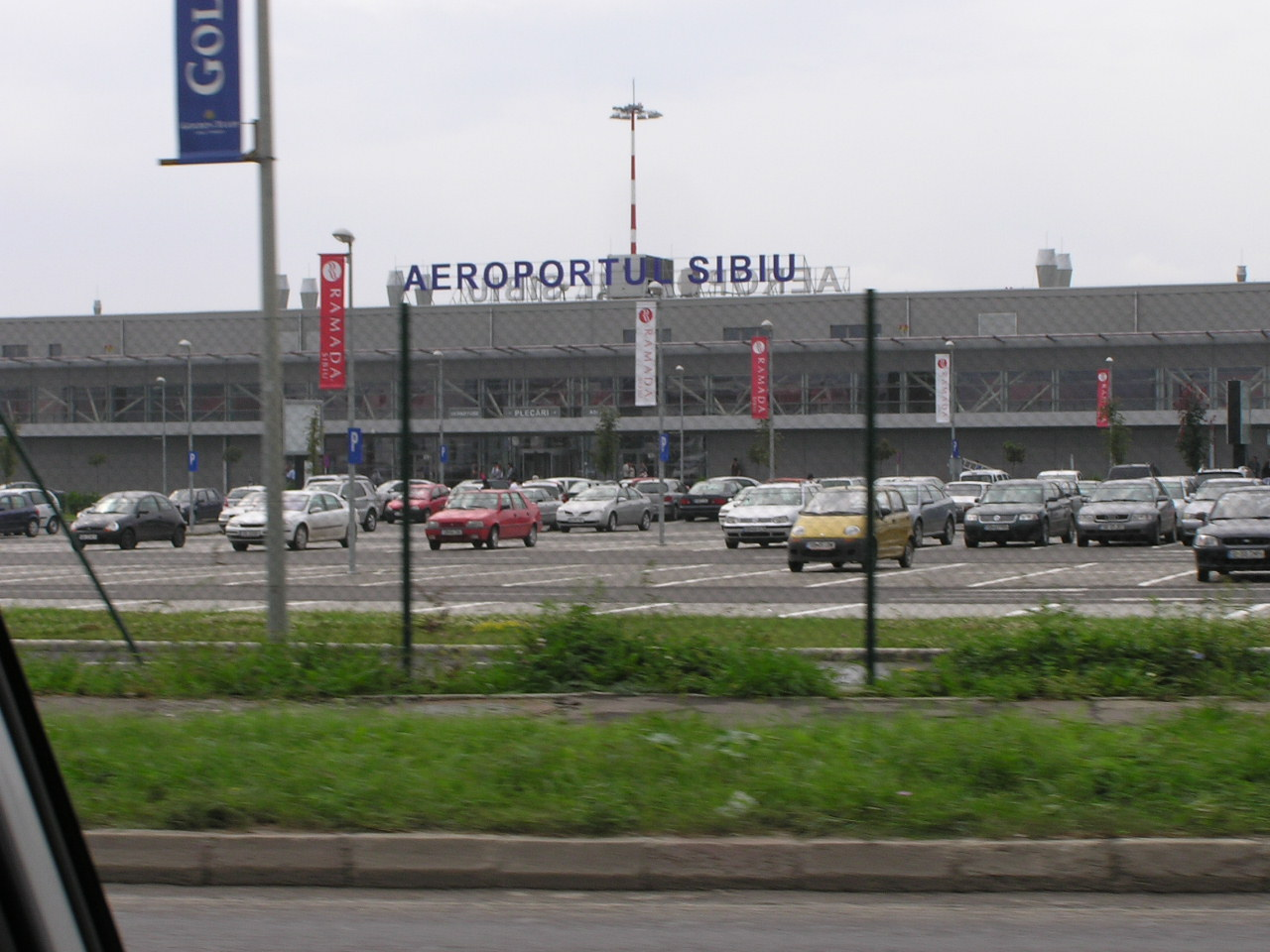
Parking lot and terminal

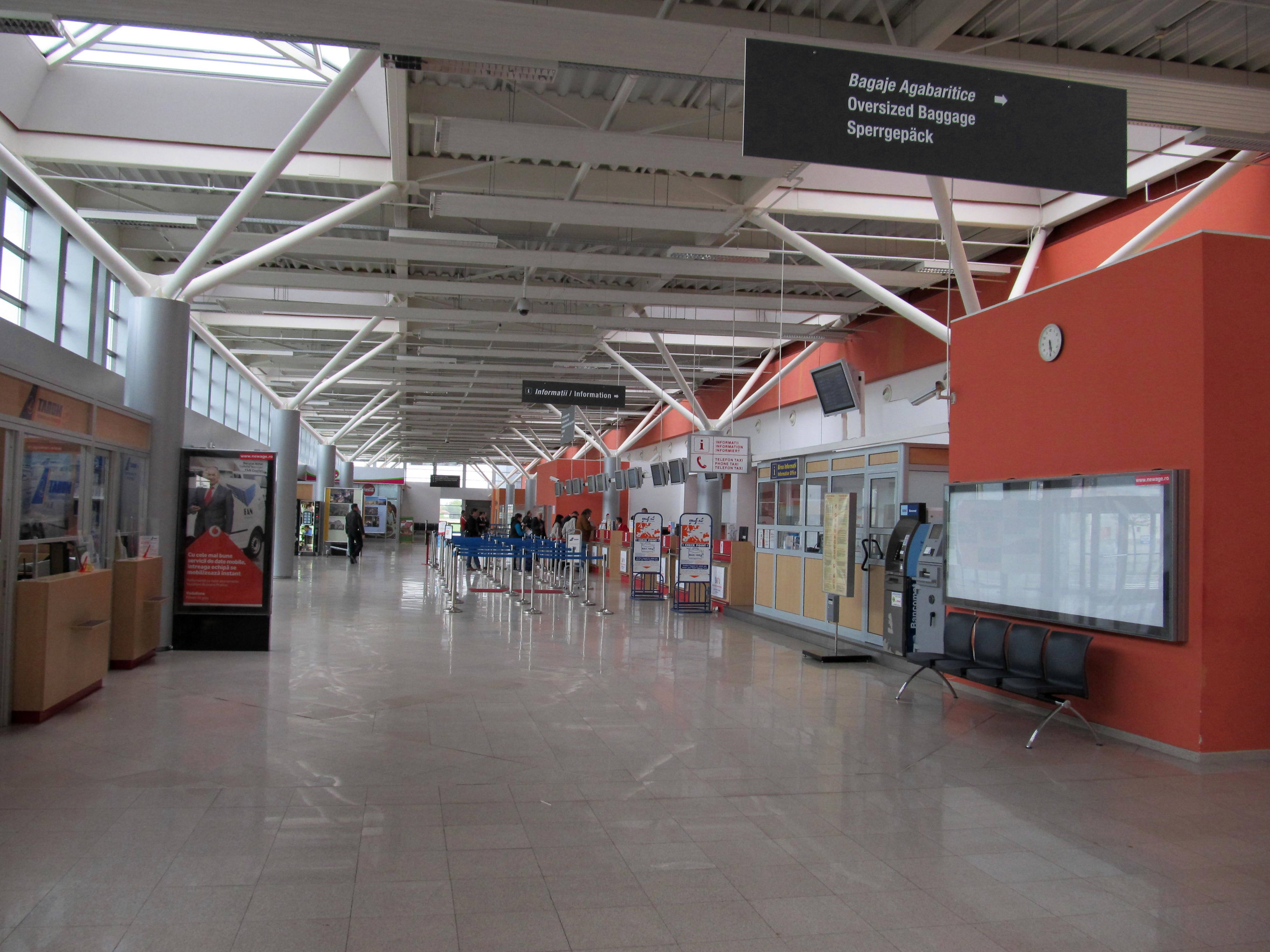
Check-in area

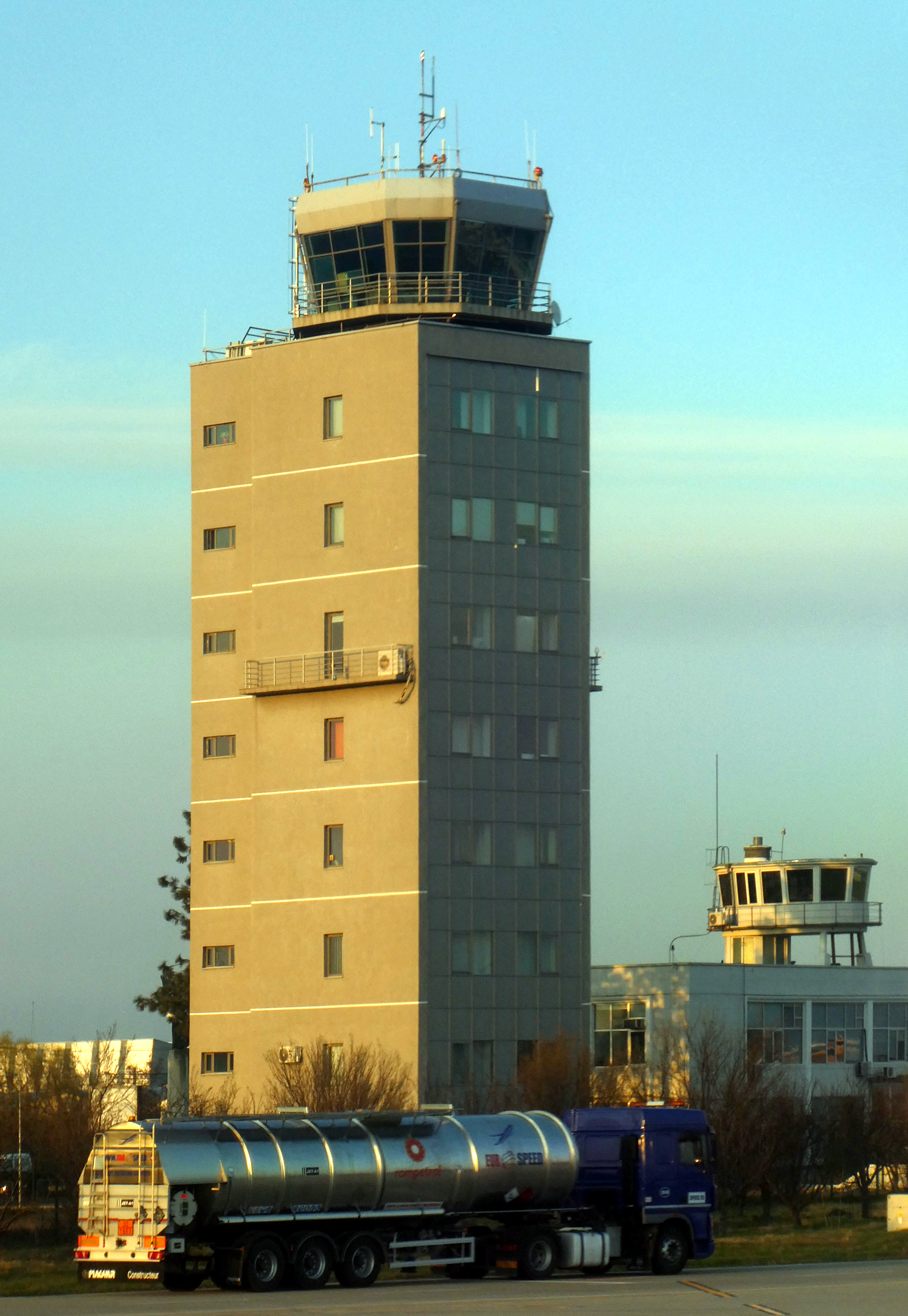
Control tower

=== Passengers ===
Monthly traffic figures (2024)
Month	2023	YTD (2023)	2024	YTD (2024)	2025	YTD (2025)
January	44,044	44,044	34,603	34,603	34,312	34,312
February	34,703	78,747	35,719	70,322	33,385	67,697
March	40,382	119,129	39,831	110,153	37,423	105,120
April	42,078	161,207	42,754	152,907	45,152	150,272
May	44,045	205,252	48,915	201,822	49,863	200,135
June	54,456	259,708	54,828	256,650	60.099	260.234
July	58,463	318,171	65,722	322,372	68,447	328,681
August	59,743	377,914	66,140	388,512	100,833	429,514
September	52,324	431,148	59,599	448,111	84,811	514,325
October	44,539	475,687	48,505	496,916	71,712	586,037
November	37,307	512,994	39,598	536,214	52,283	638,320
December	38,283	551,277	37,713	573,927	56,485	694,805

=== Traffic figures ===
Annual traffic without transit
Year	Passengers	Aircraft movements
2005	45,494	3,500
2006	▲63,618	3,818
2007	▲105,654	5,014
2008	▲141,012	5,995
2009	▲154,161	6,419
2010	▲198,751	6,077
2011	▼176,908	4,824
2012	▼176,503	4,574
2013	▲189,300	4,834
2014	▲215,951	4,908
2015	▲276,533	4,552
2016	▲366,065	5,342
2017	▲503,906	7,714
2018	▲673,657	8,529
2019	▲729,160	8,514
2020	▼226,451	3,434
2021	▲280,644	4,796
2022	▲621,514	7,098
2023	▼550,397	6,608
2024	▲573,918	6,741
2025	▲694,805	7,733

=== Busiest routes ===
Busiest Routes from Sibiu International Airport (2015) & (2016) & (2017)
Rank	Airport	Passengers 2015	Passengers 2016	Passengers 2017	Carriers
1	Munich	145,223	142,391	164,778	Lufthansa
2	London	40,424	59,660	75,162	Wizz Air
3	Stuttgart	43,859	51,717	56,521	Blue Air
4	Dortmund	36,531	40,850	44,930	Wizz Air
5	Nuremberg	-	-	40,406	Wizz Air
6	Vienna	36,385	35,808	35,212	Austrian Airlines
7	Madrid	-	-	33,992	Wizz Air
8	Memmingen	-	-	24,805	Wizz Air
^{Source:Eurostat}

== See also ==
- Aviation in Romania
- Transport in Romania
