= Paphos International Airport =

Paphos International Airport Διεθνής Αερολιμένας Πάφου Baf Uluslararası Havalimanı

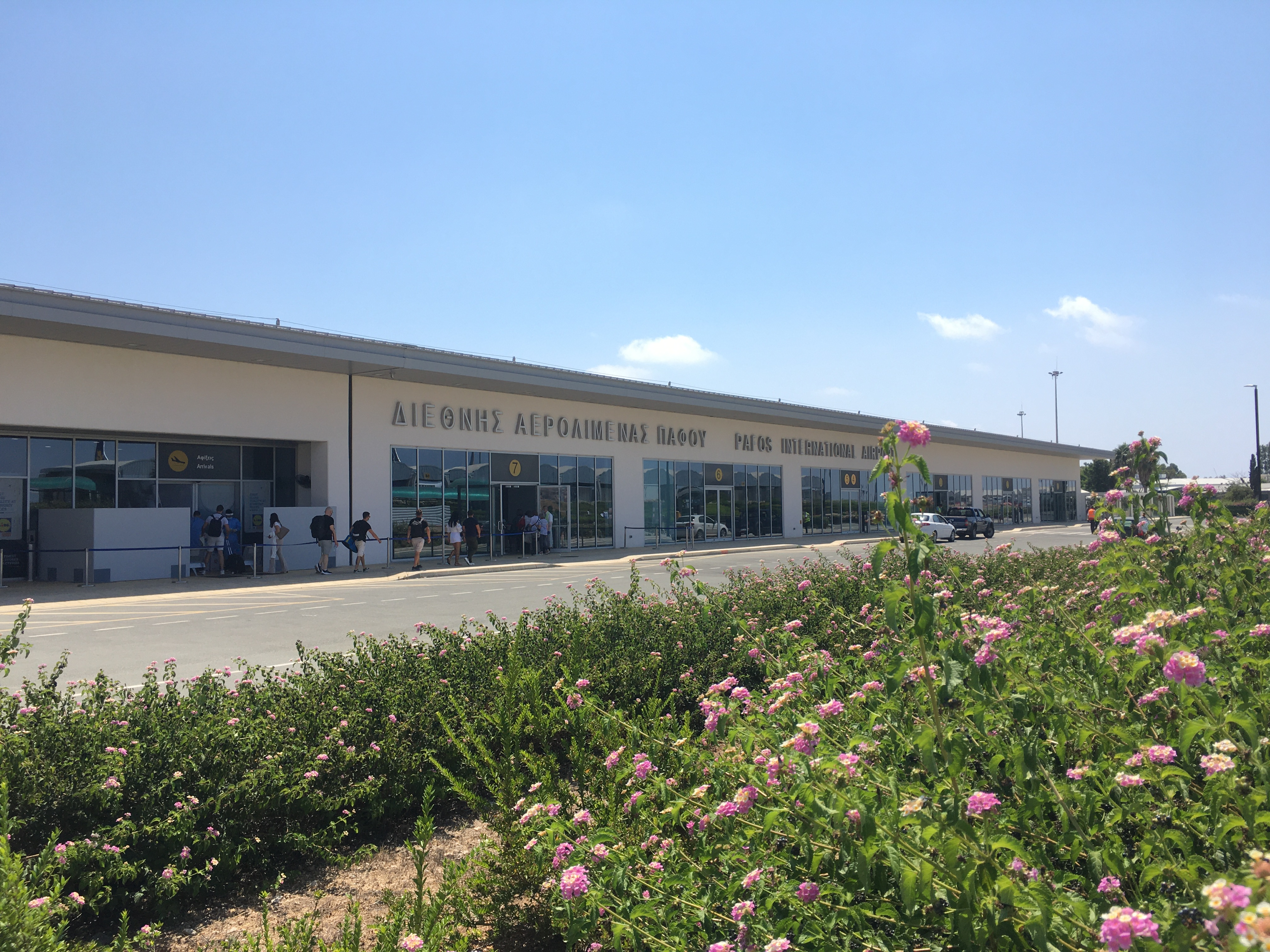
- IATA: PFO; ICAO: LCPH

Summary
- Airport type: Public / military
- Owner: Republic of Cyprus
- Operator: Hermes Airports Ltd
- Serves: Paphos; Limassol
- Location: Timi and Acheleia, Cyprus
- Opened: 1982; 44 years ago
- Focus city for: Ryanair
- Time zone: Eastern European Time (+2)
  - Summer (DST): Eastern European Summer Time (+3)
- Elevation AMSL: 12 m (39 ft)
- Coordinates: 34°43′06″N 32°29′06″E
- Website: HermesAirports.com

Maps
- Location within Cyprus Location within Europe
- Interactive map of Paphos International Airport

Runways
Direction	Length		Surface
Direction	m	ft	Surface
11/29	2,700	8,855	asphalt concrete

Statistics (2025)
- Passengers: 3,837,155 ▲5.5%
- Aircraft movements: 22,709 ▲5.4%
- Cargo (tonnes): 81.5 ▼38.6%
- Sources: Hermes Airports, Cypriot AIP at EUROCONTROL

Paphos International Airport (Greek: Διεθνής Αερολιμένας Πάφου; Turkish: Baf Uluslararası Havalimanı) (IATA: PFO, ICAO: LCPH) is a joint civil-military public airport located 6.5 kilometres (4 miles) south-east of the city of Paphos on the Mediterranean island of Cyprus. It is the country's second largest airport, after Larnaca International Airport. Paphos Airport is commonly used by holidaymakers in western Cyprus, providing access to popular resorts such as Coral Bay, Limassol (about 50 km or 30 mi southeast), and Paphos itself.

== History ==
The airport first opened in 1982; 44 years ago. In May 2006, Hermes Airports Limited took over the construction, development, and operation of both Larnaca and Paphos airports for a period of 25 years. According to the airport operator, Paphos Airport served 1,744,011 passengers in 2007. A new passenger terminal opened at Paphos in November 2008.

In 2012, Ryanair allocated two aircraft in Paphos with 15 new routes, offering over 80 flights a week.

A new four-lane road has recently opened to link the airport and Paphos, so passengers and staff can avoid using the B6 main road and the E603 secondary road which are often heavily congested.

== Facilities ==
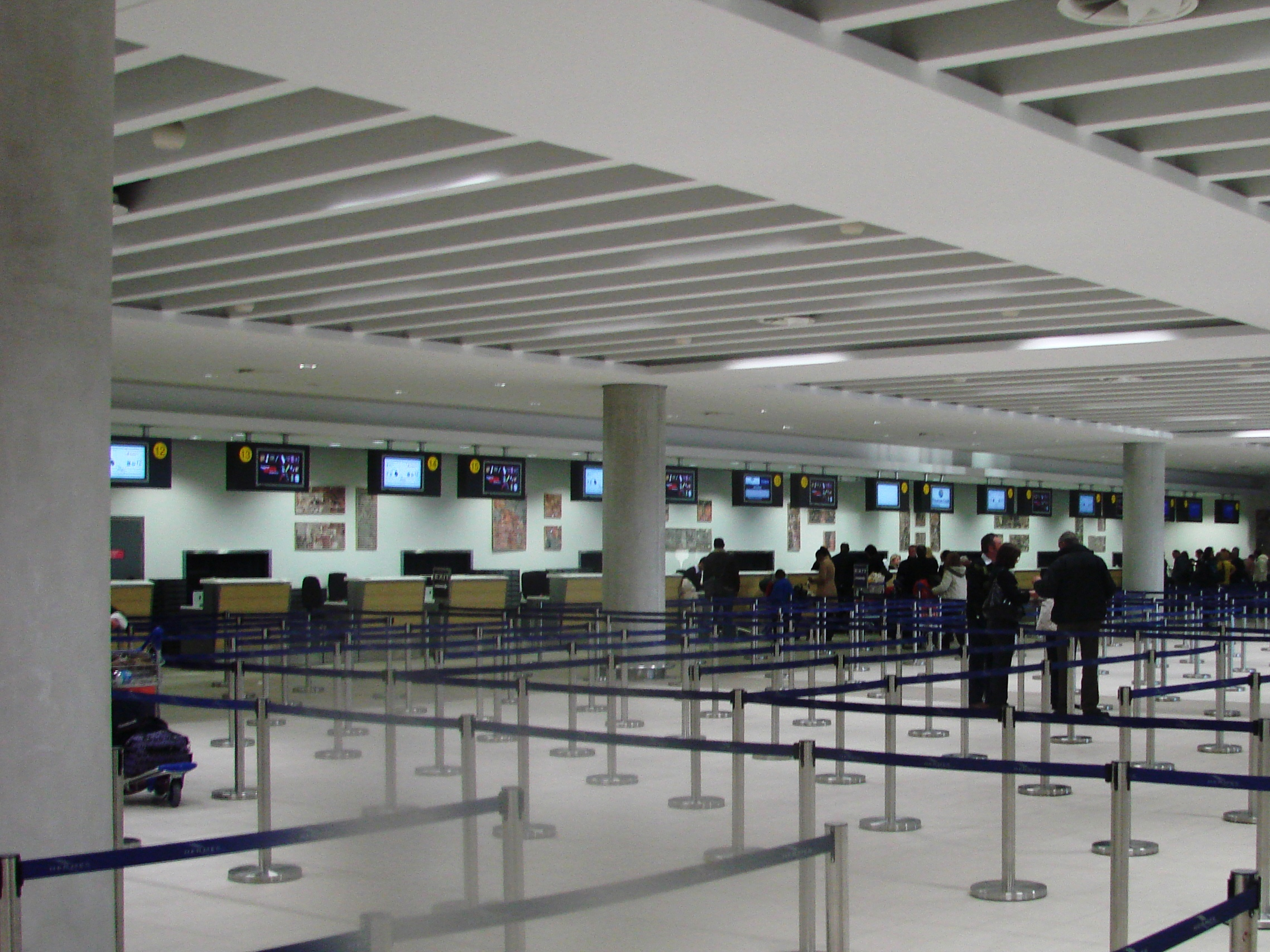
Check-in hall.

Passenger facilities include 28 check-in desks, one special baggage check-in, seven gates, 22 aircraft stands, a bank, restaurants, cafeterias, bars, a duty-free shop, and a gift shop. Other facilities include a tourist help desk, car rental, first aid, a baby/parent room, and disabled access facilities. Refrigerated storage, health officials, and X-ray equipment are among some of the facilities provided for cargo. Furthermore, loading platforms and forklifts are also available.

== Andreas Papandreou airbase ==
The airport is also an asset of the Cyprus National Guard, serving as a military air force base under the call sign 'Andreas Papandreou'. Located on the north-eastern part of the airport, it is considered the most southeastern European air force base component of various EU air forces, as well as a safe base for humanitarian and emergency purposes for other countries.

== Airlines and destinations ==
The following airlines operate regular scheduled and charter flights to and from Paphos:

Airlines	Destinations
Aegean Airlines	Athens
airHaifa	Haifa
AirSeven	Seasonal charter: Aarhus
arkia	Tel Aviv
British Airways	Seasonal: London–Gatwick, London–Heathrow
Buzz	Seasonal charter: Katowice, Poznań, Wrocław
EasyJet	Bristol, Edinburgh, London–Gatwick, London–Luton, Manchester; Seasonal: Liverpool
FlyLili	Seasonal charter: Tel Aviv
Israir	Seasonal: Tel Aviv
Jet2.com	Birmingham, East Midlands, Leeds/Bradford, London–Gatwick, London–Stansted, Manchester, Newcastle upon Tyne; Seasonal: Belfast–International, Bristol, Edinburgh, Glasgow, Liverpool
LOT Polish Airlines	Seasonal charter: Katowice, Warsaw–Chopin
Lufthansa	Seasonal: Munich
Ryanair	Athens, Beauvais, Bergamo, Berlin, Bratislava, Bucharest–Otopeni, Budapest, Cologne/Bonn, Eindhoven, Gdańsk, Katowice, Kaunas, Kraków, London–Stansted, Manchester, Memmingen, Poznań, Riga, Rome–Fiumicino, Sofia, Thessaloniki, Vienna, Warsaw–Chopin, Warsaw–Modlin, Weeze, Wrocław, Zagreb; Seasonal: Chania, Dublin, Liverpool, Mykonos, Naples, Newcastle upon Tyne, Rhodes
Sundor	Seasonal: Tel Aviv
Transavia	Seasonal: Amsterdam, Paris–Orly
TUI Airways	Seasonal: Birmingham, Bournemouth, Bristol, Cardiff, East Midlands, Exeter, Glasgow, London–Gatwick, London–Stansted, Manchester, Newcastle upon Tyne, Norwich
TUI fly Belgium	Seasonal: Brussels
TUI fly Netherlands	Seasonal: Amsterdam
Tus Airways	Seasonal: Tel Aviv
Wizz Air	Warsaw–Modlin

== Statistics ==
Annual traffic statistics at Paphos International Airport
Year	Passenger handled		Cargo		Aircraft movements	
Year	Numbers	% Change	Tonnes	% Change	Numbers	% Change
2006	1,832,655	Steady				
2007	1,744,800	▼4.7%				
2008	1,765,431	▲1.1%				
2009	1,590,905	▼9.8%				
2010	1,613,546	▲1.4%				
2011	1,778,898	▲10.2%				
2012	2,242,797	▲26.0%				
2013	2,175,114	▼3.0%				
2014	2,097,923	▼3.5%				
2015	2,277,741	▲8.5%				
2016	2,336,471	▲2.5%				
2017	2,518,169	▲7.7%				
2018	2,872,391	▲14.0%	273	Steady	17,678	Steady
2019	3,044,402	▲5.9%	399	▲46.2%	18,770	▲6.2%
2020	632,990	▼79.2%	131	▼67.2%	6,337	▼66.2%
2021	1,517,465	▲139.7%	84	▼35.9%	12,026	▲89.8%
2022	3,179,776	▲109.5%	49	▼41.7%	20,762	▲72.6%
2023	3,565,512	▲12.1%	272	▲455.1%	22,348	▲2.5%
2024	3,633,990	▲1.9%	113	▼58.5%	22,740	▲1.8%
2025	3,837,155	▲5.5%	81.5	▼58.5%	22,709	▲5.4%

=== Busiest routes ===
Top 10 busiest routes from Paphos in 2024
Rank	Airport	Passengers	Airlines
1	London–Gatwick	385,005	British Airways, EasyJet, TUI Airways
2	Manchester	298,944	EasyJet, Jet2.com, Ryanair, TUI Airways
3	London–Stansted	211,416	Jet2.com, Ryanair, TUI Airways
4	Tel Aviv	209,954	Arkia, Bluebird Airways, Fly Lili, Ryanair, Sundor, Tus Airways
5	Thessaloniki	157,849	Ryanair
6	Birmingham	120,743	Jet2.com, Ryanair, TUI Airways
7	Bristol	113,450	EasyJet, Jet2.com, TUI Airways
8	Athens	101,118	Ryanair
9	Newcastle	89,015	Jet2.com, Ryanair, TUI Airways
10	Vienna	88,115	Ryanair

== Access ==
=== Bus ===
There is a regular bus service from Paphos Harbour station to the airport, limited services also run to / from Paphos Town (Karavella) and Polis. Direct buses to/from Limassol, Nicosia and Larnaca are also available.

=== Car ===
The airport is located 20.8 km (12 15/16 mi) southeast of Paphos and 61.2 km (38 mi) west of Limassol.

== Accidents and incidents ==
- On 21 September 2011, a Thomson Airways Boeing 737-800 inadvertently landed on the taxiway parallel to the runway (Taxiway Bravo, formerly Runway 11L/29R). No other aircraft was on the taxiway at the time, and the Thomson taxied safely to the apron. A NOTAM was published on 20 December 2011, warning pilots of the possibility of mistaking the runway with the parallel taxiway. An additional NOTAM was published on 14 August 2012, recommending pilots to confirm their alignment with the runway by using the ILS localiser when performing a visual approach to runway 29. By 2014, yellow 'TAXI' markings were painted across the width of the parallel taxiway near either longitudinal end, facing approaching aircraft; and a 'TAXIWAY' marking was painted at its junction with Taxiway Charlie (about midway), facing the latter.
