= NRK (gene) =

Protein-coding gene in the species Homo sapiens

Identifiers
- Aliases: NRK, NESK, Nik related kinase
- External IDs: OMIM: 300791; MGI: 1351326; GeneCards: NRK
Enzyme activity
EC #	BRENDA	ExPASy	KEGG	MetaCyc
2.7.11.1	↗	↗	↗	↗

Gene location (Human)
Chr.	X chromosome (human)
Band	Xq22.3	Start	105,822,539 bp
Band	Xq22.3	End	105,958,610 bp

Gene location (Mouse)
Chr.	X chromosome (mouse)
Band	X F1|X 61.15 cM	Start	137,815,179 bp
Band	X F1|X 61.15 cM	End	137,911,281 bp
RNA expression pattern
Bgee	Human / Mouse (ortholog); Top expressed in: tibia; placenta; cartilage tissue; ovary; left ovary; tail of epididymis; gonad; parietal pleura; germinal epithelium; testicle / Top expressed in: human fetus; internal carotid artery; dermis; atrium; umbilical cord; atrioventricular valve; external carotid artery; yolk sac; abdominal wall; endocardial cushion; More reference expression data
BioGPS	n/a
Gene ontology
Molecular function	transferase activity; nucleotide binding; protein kinase activity; ATP binding; kinase activity; protein serine/threonine kinase activity; MAP kinase kinase kinase kinase activity
Cellular component	cytoplasm
Biological process	protein phosphorylation; regulation of spongiotrophoblast cell proliferation; birth; phosphorylation; negative regulation of cell population proliferation; regulation of mitotic cell cycle; stress-activated protein kinase signaling cascade; regulation of apoptotic process; neuron projection morphogenesis; MAPK cascade; signal transduction; actin cytoskeleton reorganization; activation of protein kinase activity
Sources:Amigo / QuickGO
Orthologs
Databases	NCBI: entry; OMA: entry
Species	Human	Mouse
Entrez	203447	27206
Ensembl	ENSG00000123572	ENSMUSG00000052854
UniProt	Q7Z2Y5	Q9R0G8
RefSeq (mRNA)	NM_198465	NM_013724
RefSeq (protein)	NP_940867	NP_038752
Location (UCSC)	Chr X: 105.82 – 105.96 Mb	Chr X: 137.82 – 137.91 Mb
PubMed search
- Wikidata
View/Edit Human	View/Edit Mouse

Nik-related protein kinase is an enzyme that, in humans, is encoded by the NRK gene.
