= Fly Lili =

Airline of Romania

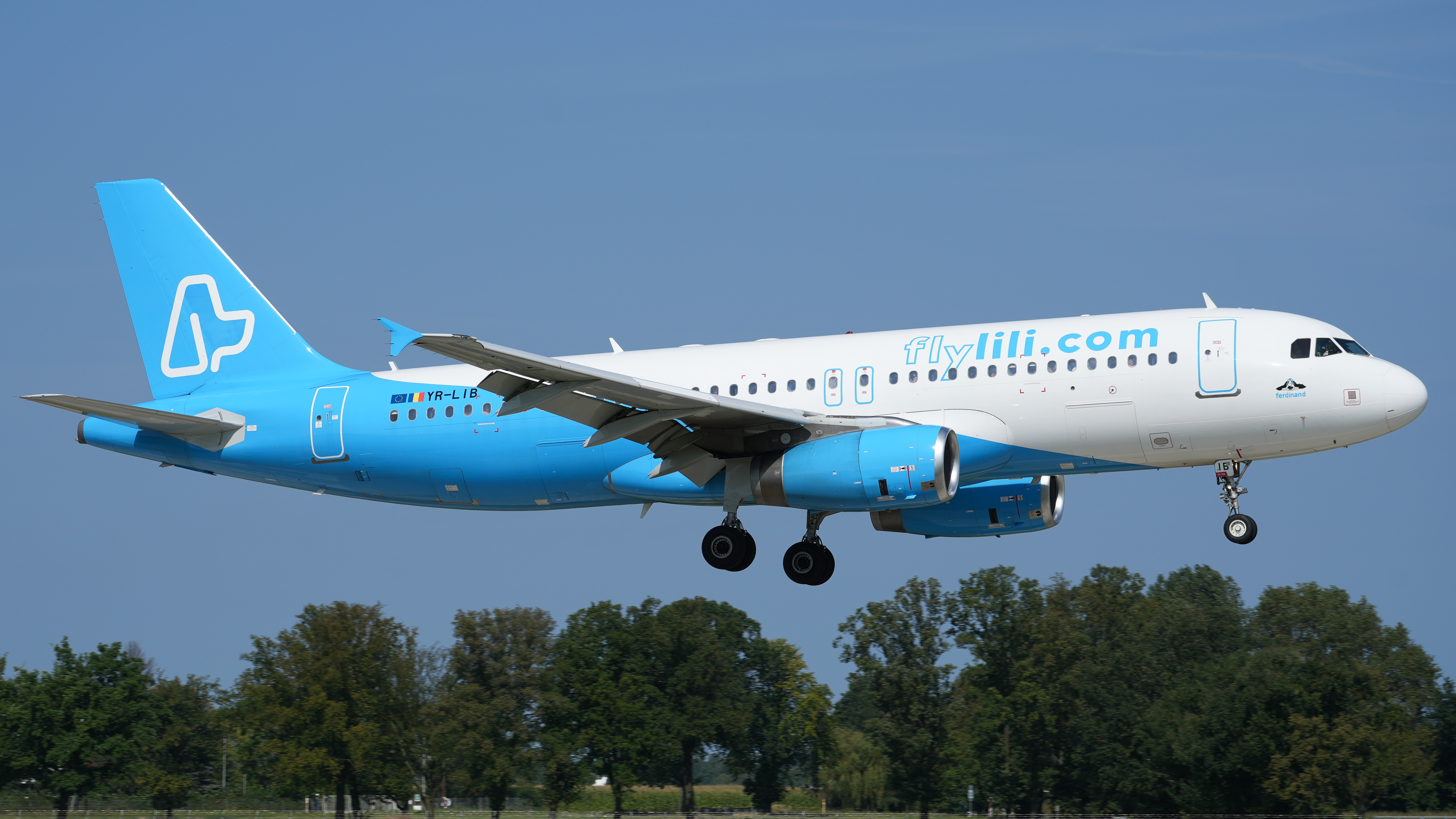
- Fly Lili Airbus A320-200
IATA	ICAO	Call sign
FL	LIL	LILIES
- Founded: 2021; 5 years ago
- Commenced operations: April 2023; 3 years ago
- Hubs: Bucharest–Băneasa
- Frequent-flyer program: Lilicoin
- Fleet size: 4
- Destinations: charter
- Revenue: ▲€9.56 million (2023)
- Net income: ▼-€2.82 million (2023)
- Website: www.flylili.com

Fly Lili is a Romanian charter airline based at Aurel Vlaicu International Airport in Bucharest.

== History ==
In April 2023, the company started its first regular charter flights, between Bucharest–Băneasa and Antalya.

Beginning in June 2024, the company also announced it would commence scheduled flights from Brașov and Sibiu to several European destinations such as Barcelona and Rome. However, in July 2024, Fly Lili suspended its flights to Munich and Stuttgart after only a few days while cancelling or delaying several other routes. Shortly after, both operational issues due to a lack of available aircraft and a dispute between the airline and Romanian authorities regarding the registration of further aircraft have been reported.

In December 2024, Fly Lili announced the termination of all scheduled operations from Brașov-Ghimbav International Airport by 9 January 2025, citing insufficient business figures. The airline plans to focus on charter operations instead.

== Destinations ==
As of January 2025, Fly Lili operates leisure charter flights from Bucharest-Baneasa to destinations in Turkey, Egypt and Tunisia. Since 2025 Fly Lili is going to operate seasonal charter flights from David Ben Gurion International Airport (Tel Aviv, Israel) to several destinations in Europe and Middle East.

=== Former scheduled destinations ===
As of September 2024, Fly Lili operated scheduled flights to the following destinations, which ceased in January 2025.

Germany

- Munich - Munich Airport
- Nuremberg - Nuremberg Airport
- Stuttgart - Stuttgart Airport

Italy

- Rome - Rome Fiumicino Airport

Romania

- Brașov - Brașov-Ghimbav International Airport base

Turkey

- Istanbul - Istanbul Airport

== Fleet ==
As of August 2025, Fly Lili operates the following aircraft:

Fly Lili fleet
Aircraft	In service	Orders	Passengers			Notes
Aircraft	In service	Orders	C	Y	Total	Notes
Airbus A319-100	2			150	150	
Airbus A320-200	2	—	—	180	180	
Total	4					
