= Department of Civil Aviation (Cyprus) =

The Department of Civil Aviation (DCA; Greek: Τμήμα Πολιτικής Αεροπορίας Turkish: Sivil Havacılık Dairesi) is an agency of the Ministry of Communications and Works (Cyprus). Its head office is in Nicosia.

The agency was established in 1955.
