= Larnaca International Airport =

Airport on the island of Cyprus

Larnaca International Airport Διεθνής Αερολιμένας Λάρνακας Larnaka Uluslararası Havalimanı

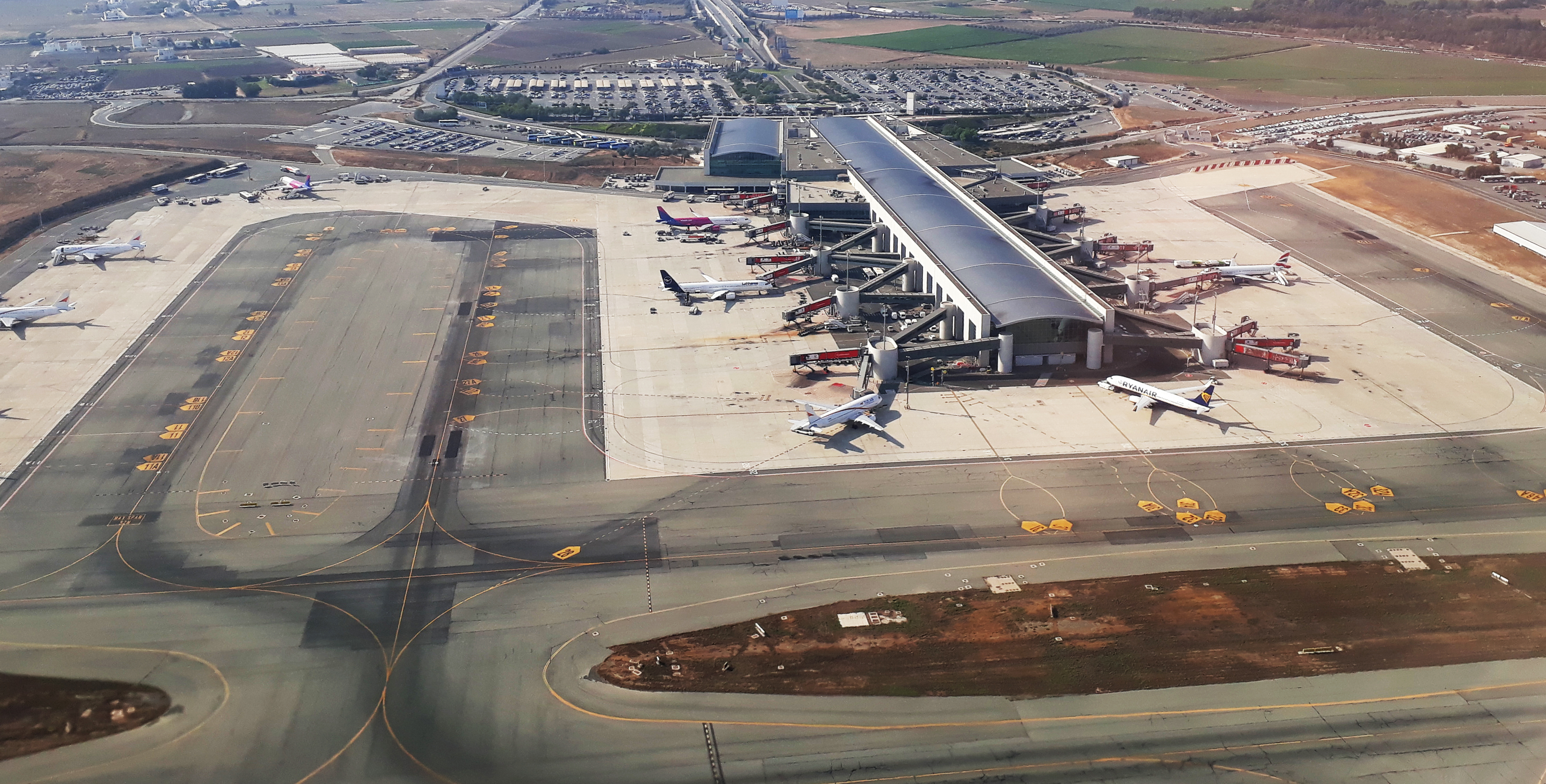
- IATA: LCA; ICAO: LCLK

Summary
- Airport type: Public
- Owner: Cyprus
- Operator: Hermes Airports Ltd
- Serves: Limassol; Larnaca; Nicosia; Ayia Napa
- Location: Dromolaxia and Meneou, Larnaca District, Cyprus
- Opened: 8 February 1975; 51 years ago
- Hub for: Cyprus Airways; Aegean Airlines; Tus Airways
- Focus city for: Wizz Air; Aegean Airlines
- Time zone: Eastern European Time (+2)
  - Summer (DST): Eastern European Summer Time (+3)
- Elevation AMSL: 3.35 m (11.0 ft)
- Coordinates: 34°52′44″N 033°37′49″E
- Website: www.hermesairports.com

Maps
- Location within Cyprus Location within Europe
- Interactive map of Larnaca International Airport

Runways
Direction	Length		Surface
Direction	m	ft	Surface
04/22	3,000	9,823	Asphalt

Statistics (2025)
- Passengers: 9,914,092 ▲14.4%
- Aircraft movements: 64,177 ▲13.9%
- Cargo (tonnes): 35,238 ▲12.3%
- Sources: Hermes Airports, Cypriot AIP at EUROCONTROL

Larnaca International Airport – Glafcos Clerides (Note: Greek: Διεθνής Aερολιμένας Λάρνακας (Diethnís Aeroliménas Lárnakas). Turkish: Larnaka Uluslararası Havalimanı).) (IATA: LCA, ICAO: LCLK) is an international airport located four kilometres (2 1/2 miles) southwest of Larnaca, Cyprus. Larnaca International Airport is Cyprus' main international airport and the larger of the two commercial airports in the area controlled by the Republic of Cyprus (the other being Paphos International Airport on the island's southwestern coast) and one of the busiest airports in the Middle East. The airport was given its current name in July 2016, in honour of former President of Cyprus (1993–2003) Glafcos Clerides.

== History ==
Larnaca Airport was hastily developed towards the end of 1974 after the invasion of Cyprus by Turkey on 20 July of the same year, which forced the closure of the Nicosia International Airport. The site on which it was built (near the Larnaca Salt Lake) had been previously used as an airfield in the 1930s and, subsequently, as a military installation by British forces. Larnaca International opened on 8 February 1975, with only limited infrastructure facilities and a prefabricated set of buildings comprising separate halls for departures and arrivals. The first airlines to use the new airport were Cyprus Airways, using Viscount 800s leased from British Midland, and Olympic Airways, using NAMC YS-11s. Initially, the runway at Larnaca International was too short for jet aircraft.

== Operations ==
The status of Cyprus as a major tourist destination means that air traffic has steadily risen to over 5 million passengers a year. This is double the capacity the airport was first designed for. For this reason, a tender was put out in 1998 to develop the airport further and increase its capacity. Already completed elements of the expansion include a new control tower, fire station, runway extension, and additional administrative offices. The surrounding road network was improved by upgrading the B4 road; a new junction has been constructed near the new terminal. The new terminal was built some 500–700 m (1,600–2,300 ft) west of the old terminal, adjacent to the new control tower, with new aprons and jetways. The old terminal building is slated to be partially demolished and refurbished as a cargo centre, and is currently used as a private terminal for visiting heads of state, other VIPs, and private aircraft operators.

In 2024, the UK, Greece, Israel, Poland, and Germany were highlighted as crucial markets for Cyprus, accounting for 64% of total passengers, with 7.8 million passengers. Key destinations included London and Athens, each drawing around 1.4 million passengers, and Tel Aviv, with close to 1 million.

The airport's geographic location in-between Europe, Africa, Russia and the Middle East facilitates it as an airline hub for traffic and flight operations between these locations. It currently holds domestic, regional, and international passenger and cargo services by over 50 airlines. Notably, Gulf Air used to provide a non-stop service to New York-JFK twice a week.

Due to budget concerns, Romanian low-cost carrier Blue Air announced the closure of their Larnaca base in September 2020 and went bankrupt in March 2023.

== Facilities ==
The airport has one primary state-of-the-art passenger terminal. Departures are accommodated on the upper level, while arrivals are accommodated at the ground level. The old terminal was renovated and is privately operated by Skylink Services Ltd who manage and operate a "VIP terminal", which is used for executive aircraft and for visiting heads of state, and other non commercial aircraft. The airport utilises a single large apron for all passenger aircraft, with another apron serving cargo, aircraft storage, and VIP operations. The concept architectural design of the passenger terminal was developed by French architects at Aéroports de Paris (ADP) with Sofréavia in France.

A €650 million upgrade of the Larnaca and Paphos airports was completed in 2006. The international tender was won by Hermes Airports, a French-led group. The consortium is made up of Bouygues Batiment International (22%) Egis Projects (20%), the Cyprus Trading Corporation (a local retail group-10%), Iacovou Brothers (a local contractor-10%), Hellenic Mining (10%), Vancouver Airport Services (10%), Ireland's Dublin Airport Authority (Aer Rianta International) (10%), Charilaos Apostolides (a local construction company-5%) and Nice Côte d'Azur Airport (3%).

A new terminal building opened on 7 November 2009. It has 16 jetways (boarding bridges), 67 check-in counters, 8 self check-in kiosks, 48 departure gates, and 2,450 parking spots. The terminal was designed to handle 7.5 million passengers per year, and operates in excess of this. Infrastructure also features a large engineering hangar, a cargo terminal, and separate facilities for fuelling and provisioning light aircraft. There is a second, smaller apron where cargo aircraft and private aircraft are often parked. There are also spaces for smaller aircraft for flying schools and privately owned aircraft separate from the main two aprons.

The airport's main terminal is currently being expanded to serve 12.4 million passengers per year. This will include a new security area, further remote parking stands, and a new western wing, connected to the main terminal building.

== Airlines and destinations ==
=== Passenger ===
The following airlines operate regular scheduled and charter flights to and from Larnaca:

Airlines	Destinations
Aegean Airlines	Athens, Brussels, Heraklion, Tel Aviv, Thessaloniki; Seasonal: Rhodes, Rome–Fiumicino; Seasonal charter: Yerevan
Air Astana	Seasonal: Almaty, Astana
Air Baltic	Riga
Air Haifa	Haifa
Air Serbia	Belgrade
Animawings	Seasonal: Bucharest–Otopeni
Arkia	Tel Aviv
Atlantic Airways	Seasonal charter: Billund
Austrian Airlines	Vienna
Avion Express	Seasonal charter: Vilnius
BH Air	Seasonal charter: Sofia
BlueBird Airways	Tel Aviv
British Airways	London–Gatwick, London–Heathrow
Buzz	Seasonal charter: Gdańsk, Katowice, Poznań, Warsaw–Chopin, Wrocław
Chair Airlines	Seasonal: Zürich
Condor	Seasonal: Düsseldorf, Zürich
Cyprus Airways	Athens, Beirut, Dubai–International, Heraklion, London–Stansted (begins 23 April 2027), Milan–Malpensa, Munich (resumes 17 December 2026), Paris–Charles de Gaulle, Rome–Fiumicino (resumes 11 December 2026), Tel Aviv; Seasonal: Barcelona, Preveza/Lefkada, Rhodes, Santorini, Skiathos, Venice; Seasonal charter: Bratislava, Craiova, Košice, Piešťany, Poprad–Tatry, Sibiu
Dan Air	Seasonal: Bacău, Bucharest–Otopeni
Discover Airlines	Frankfurt, Munich
EasyJet	Amsterdam, Basel/Mulhouse, Berlin, London–Gatwick; Seasonal: Belfast–International, Birmingham, Bristol, Geneva, Glasgow, Liverpool, London–Luton, Manchester, Newcastle upon Tyne (begins 31 March 2027), Paris–Charles de Gaulle
Edelweiss Air	Zürich
Egyptair	Cairo
Emirates	Dubai–International, Malta
Enter Air	Seasonal charter: Katowice, Warsaw–Chopin
Eurowings	Düsseldorf; Seasonal: Berlin, Hamburg, Salzburg, Stuttgart
Finnair	Seasonal: Helsinki
FlyLili	Seasonal charter: Tel Aviv
FlyOne	Chişinău, Yerevan
Georgian Airways	Tbilisi
Gulf Air	Bahrain
Helvetic Airways	Seasonal: Bern
Heston Airlines	Seasonal charter: Tallinn
HiSky	Seasonal charter: Brașov, Bucharest–Otopeni, Cluj-Napoca, Iași, Oradea, Sibiu, Timișoara
Israir	Tel Aviv
Jazeera Airways	Seasonal: Kuwait City
Jet2.com	Seasonal: Birmingham, Bristol, East Midlands, Edinburgh, Glasgow, Leeds/Bradford, London–Stansted, Manchester, Newcastle upon Tyne
Jettime	Seasonal charter: Aalborg, Billund, Copenhagen, Helsinki, Luleå, Malmö
LOT Polish Airlines	Warsaw–Chopin
Middle East Airlines	Beirut
Norwegian Air Shuttle	Oslo; Seasonal: Copenhagen, Helsinki, Stockholm–Arlanda; Seasonal charter: Trondheim
Qatar Airways	Doha
Royal Jordanian	Amman–Queen Alia
Ryanair	Vienna
Scandinavian Airlines	Seasonal: Copenhagen, Oslo, Stockholm–Arlanda; Seasonal charter: Bergen, Gothenburg
Sky Express	Athens, Thessaloniki; Seasonal: Heraklion
SkyUp	Chişinău
Smartwings	Seasonal: Bratislava, Košice, Prague; Seasonal charter: Katowice, Warsaw–Chopin
Sundor	Tel Aviv
Sunclass Airlines	Seasonal charter: Bergen, Billund, Borlange, Copenhagen, Gothenburg, Helsinki, Malmö, Norrköping, Örebro, Oslo, Sandefjord, Stavanger, Stockholm–Arlanda, Trondheim, Växjö
Swiss International Air Lines	Seasonal: Geneva
Transavia	Amsterdam; Seasonal: Paris–Orly
TUI Airways	Seasonal: Belfast–International, Birmingham, Bournemouth (begins 4 May 2027), Bristol, Cardiff, East Midlands, London–Gatwick, Manchester, Newcastle upon Tyne
TUI fly Deutschland	Seasonal: Düsseldorf, Frankfurt, Hannover
TUI fly Nordic	Seasonal charter: Gothenburg, Norrköping, Stockholm–Arlanda, Umeå
Tus Airways	Tel Aviv
Wizz Air	Abu Dhabi, Athens, Barcelona, Belgrade, Bratislava, Bucharest–Otopeni, Budapest, Chişinău, Cluj-Napoca, Gdańsk, Gyumri, Iași, Katowice, Kraków, Kutaisi, London–Gatwick, London–Luton, Madrid, Milan–Malpensa, Prague, Rome–Fiumicino, Sofia, Suceava, Târgu Mureș, Tel Aviv, Thessaloniki, Timișoara, Varna, Venice, Vilnius, Warsaw–Chopin, Warsaw–Radom, Yerevan; Seasonal: Debrecen, Skopje, Tuzla, Wrocław

=== Cargo ===
Airlines	Destinations
Challenge Airlines IL	Atlanta, Liège, New York–JFK, Tel Aviv
DHL Aviation	Brescia, Leipzig/Halle, Milan–Malpensa, Pisa, Venice
EgyptAir Cargo	Cairo, Ostend/Bruges
FedEx Express	Athens, Liège, Paris–Charles de Gaulle, Rome–Fiumicino
Lufthansa Cargo	Athens, Frankfurt, Milan–Malpensa
Poste Air Cargo	Milan–Malpensa, Rome–Fiumicino, Tel Aviv
Royal Jordanian Cargo	Amman–Queen Alia, Liège, Maastricht/Aachen
Swiftair	Athens
UPS Airlines	Cologne/Bonn, Istanbul, Tel Aviv

== Statistics ==
In 2024 the UK, Greece, Israel, Poland, and Germany were highlighted as crucial markets for Cyprus, accounting for 64% total, with 7.8 million passengers. Moreover, key destinations included London and Athens, each drawing around 1.4 million passengers, and Tel Aviv, with close to 1 million.

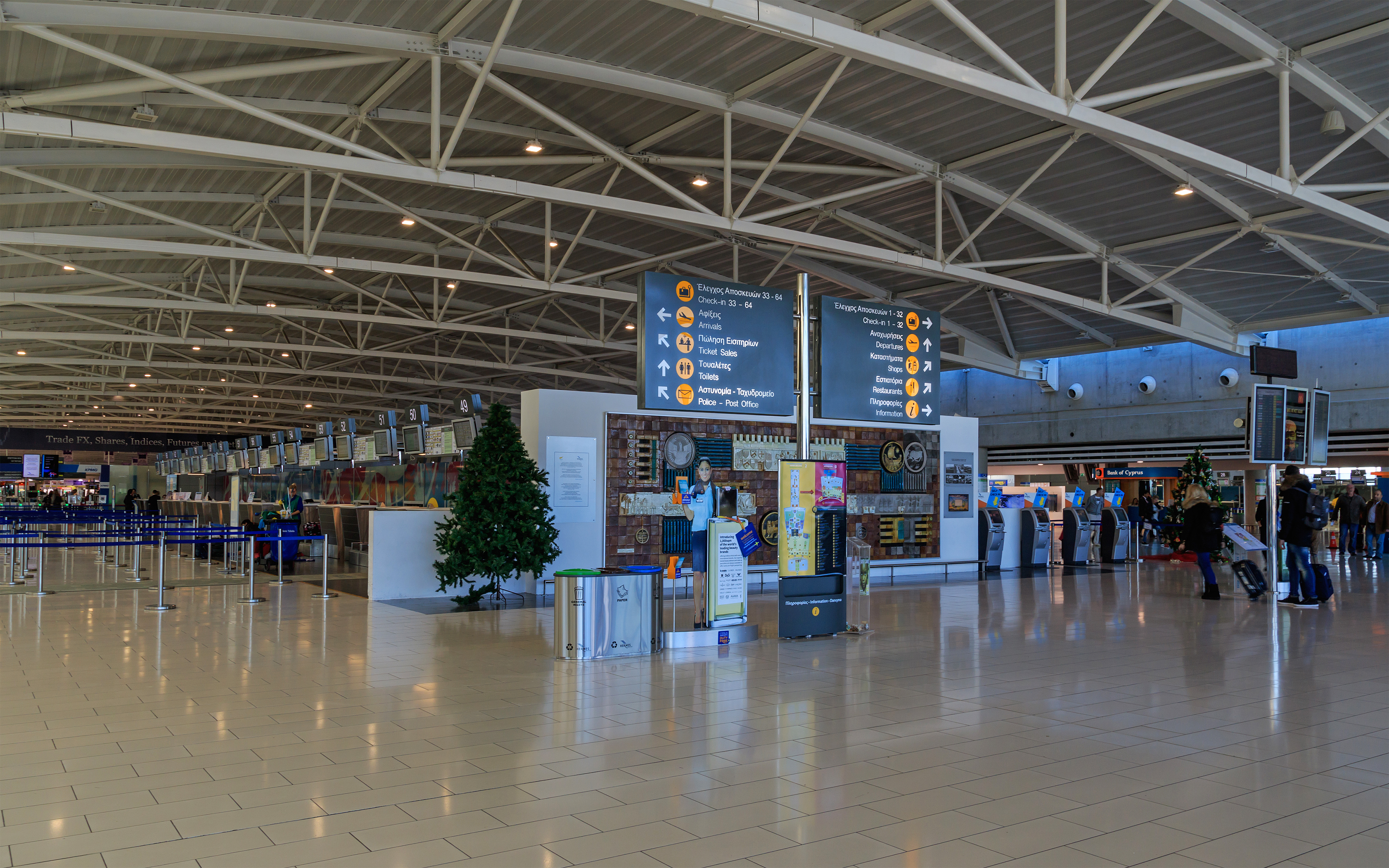
LCA check-in area

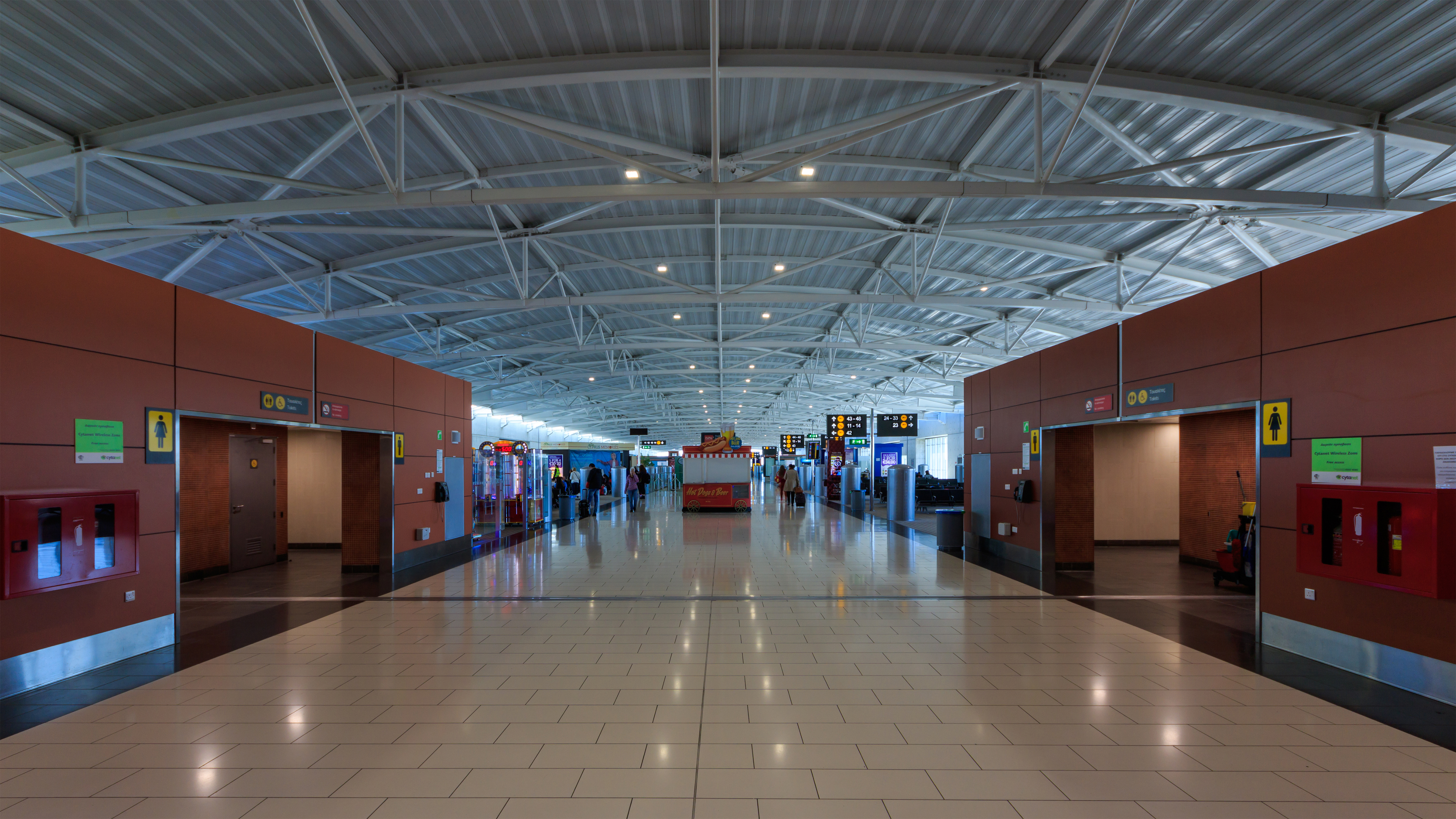
LCA departure gate area

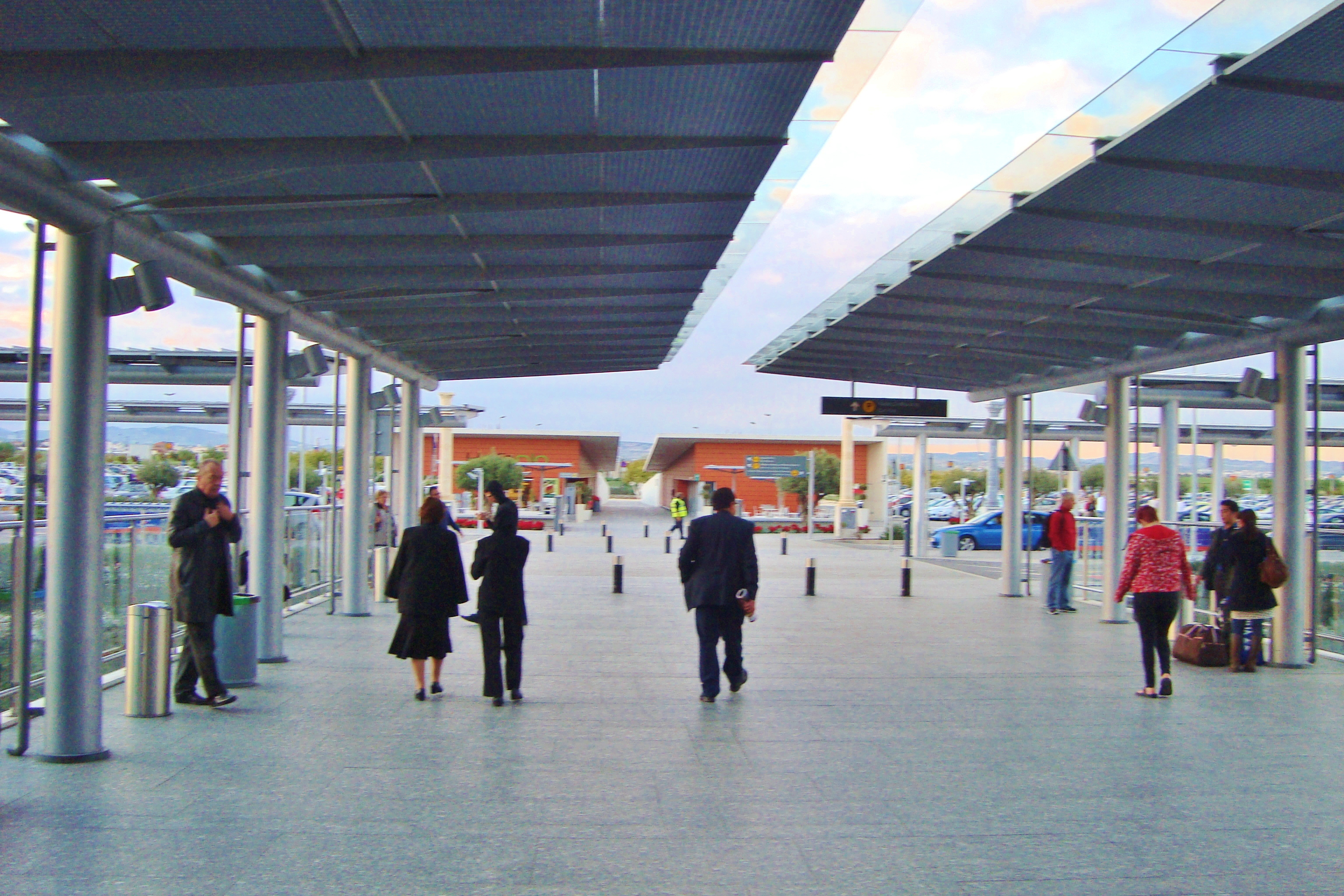
LCA entrance

Annual traffic statistics at Larnaca International Airport
Year	Passengers		Cargo		Aircraft movements	
Year	Numbers	% Change	Tonnes	% Change	Numbers	% Change
2006	4,927,986	Steady				
2007	5,284,159	▲7.2%				
2008	5,488,319	▲3.8%				
2009	5,169,224	▼5.8%				
2010	5,367,724	▲3.8%				
2011	5,507,552	▲2.6%				
2012	5,166,224	▼6.1%				
2013	4,863,577	▼5.8%				
2014	5,247,291	▲7.8%				
2015	5,330,914	▲1.5%				
2016	6,637,692	▲24.5%				
2017	7,734,290	▲16.5%				
2018	8,067,037	▲4.3%	29,568	Steady	60,030	Steady
2019	8,229,346	▲2.0%	29,661	▲0.3%	56,522	▼5.7%
2020	1,679,816	▼79.6%	22,975	▼23.6%	18,904	▼66.6%
2021	3,592,011	▲113.4%	24,366	▲6.0%	31,965	▲69.1%
2022	6,037,053	▲68.0%	23,960	▲1.7%	44,090	▲38.8%
2023	8,073,932	▲33.7%	24,953	▲4.1%	52,065	▲28.3%
2024	8,661,354	▲8.2%	31,372	▲25.7%	60,715	▲16.6%
2025	9,914,092	▲14.4%	35,238	▲13.9%	64,177	▲12.3%

=== Busiest routes ===
Top 10 busiest routes from Larnaca in 2024
Rank	Airport	Passengers	Airlines
1	Athens	1,323,893	Aegean Airlines, Cyprus Airways, Sky Express, Wizz Air
2	Tel Aviv	837,599	Aegean Airlines, Arkia, Bluebird Airways, Corendon Airlines, Cyprus Airways, Fly Lili, Israir, Neos, Sundor
3	London–Heathrow	397,090	British Airways
4	London–Gatwick	344,678	British Airways, EasyJet, TUI Airways, Wizz Air
5	Vienna	312,757	Austrian Airlines, Ryanair, Wizz Air
6	Thessaloniki	286,032	Aegean Airlines, Sky Express, Wizz Air
7	Dubai	247,406	Cyprus Airways, Emirates
8	Yerevan	234,871	Aegean Airlines, FlyOne, Wizz Air
9	Warsaw–Chopin	202,503	Buzz, Enter Air, LOT Polish Airlines, SkyUp, SmartWings, Wizz Air
10	Belgrade	189,991	Air Serbia, Wizz Air

== Access ==
The airport can be reached by car, taxi and public transport system. There is a shuttle bus system to and from Limassol, Nicosia, Protaras, Paralimni and Ayia Napa. Urban buses are available at the airport to various locations in Larnaca.

== Security incidents and accidents ==
- On 13 October 1977, Lufthansa Flight 181, flying from Palma de Mallorca to Frankfurt, with 91 passengers and crew was hijacked by four Popular Front for the Liberation of Palestine (PFLP) members, and was diverted and landed in turn at the airports in Rome, Larnaca, Bahrain, and Dubai. The Boeing 737 was then forced to fly on to Mogadishu Airport, Somalia, where a West German antiterrorist squad stormed the plane, killing three hijackers, arresting one and rescuing all passengers. The captain of the flight had previously been murdered by the lead terrorist.
- On 19 February 1978, Egyptian commandos exchanged gunfire with Cypriot special forces on the tarmac at Larnaca. Seventeen Egyptian commandos were killed.
- On 5 April 1988, Kuwait Airways Flight 422, a Kuwait Airways Boeing 747, was hijacked, while en route from Thailand to Kuwait. After forcing the plane to fly to Iran, the hijackers forced the crew to fly the plane further west to Algeria, but the plane landed in Larnaca for refuelling. Two Kuwaiti hostages were murdered by the hijackers and their bodies were thrown out on the airport's runway. The Cypriot authorities managed to release 12 hostages; in exchange, they agreed to resupply the plane with jet fuel. The hijacking ended in Algeria on 20 April 1988.
- On 29 March 2016, EgyptAir Flight 181, operated by Airbus A320-232 SU-GCB, was hijacked whilst on a flight from Borg El Arab Airport to Cairo International Airport. The aircraft landed at Larnaca. The hijacker claimed to be wearing an explosive belt, but it was later revealed to be fake.
- In order to test the preparedness and observance of the members of the private company Hermes Airports in charge of control duties, a secret exercise was conducted at Larnaca International Airport on 9 March 2023, from 8 a.m. to 11 a.m., by two police officers posing as civilian passengers who successfully passed through the security check with a dummy explosive device and prohibited dangerous materials, such as knives, without being detected. The exercise took place after the police passport control for exit from the country, where private company officers carry out a physical check as a complementary check. The operation was ordered by the police director of airport security without informing the civil aviation authority or the airport operator.
- On 24 February 2025, a FlyOne flight which landed in Larnaka was boarded by the Special Anti-terrorist Squad of Cyprus Police as one of the passengers was suspected of being a terrorist with the flight remaining for a few hours on the ground and the suspect being taken for interrogation by Larnaka CID.

== See also ==
- List of the busiest airports in the Middle East
