= Standing Room Only =

Standing Room Only may refer to:

- Standing-room only, an event where all of the seats are occupied, forcing later attendees to stand

== Film and television ==
- Standing Room Only (1912 film), an American silent short romantic comedy
- Standing Room Only (1944 film), an American film starring Paulette Goddard and Fred MacMurray
- Standing Room Only (2003 film), directed by Deborra-Lee Furness
- Standing Room Only (1991 TV programme), a 1991 BBC television programme on association football
- Standing Room Only (TV series), a 1976 entertainment series on HBO

== Literature ==
- Standing Room Only (novel), a 1936 comedy novel by Walter Greenwood

== Music ==
- Standing Room Only (Tesla album)
- Standing Room Only (The Motels album), 2006
- Standing Room Only (Tim McGraw album), 2023
- "Standing Room Only" (Barbara Mandrell song), 1976
- "Standing Room Only" (Tim McGraw song), 2023
- "Standing Room Only", a 1967 gospel song by Loretta Lynn from Who Says God Is Dead!
- Sinatra: Standing Room Only, a 2018 live box set by Frank Sinatra

== See also ==
- SRO (disambiguation)
