= Manchester Airport =

International airport in Greater Manchester, England

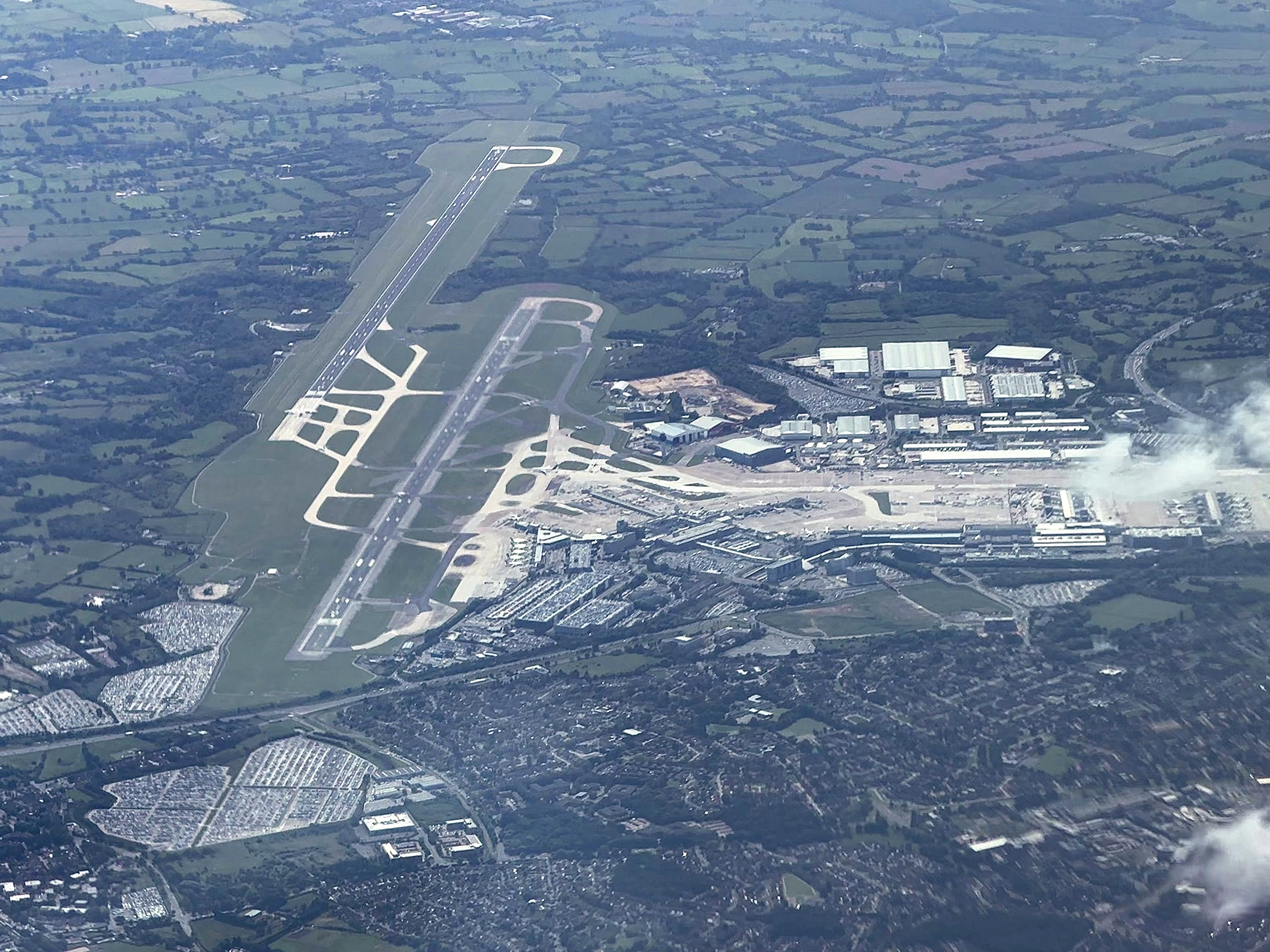
- IATA: MAN; ICAO: EGCC; WMO: 03334

Summary
- Airport type: Public
- Owner/Operator: Manchester Airports Group
- Serves: Greater Manchester
- Location: Ringway, Manchester, England
- Opened: 25 June 1938; 88 years ago
- Hub for: Virgin Atlantic
- Operating base for: easyJet UK; Jet2.com; TUI Airways; Ryanair
- Built: 1938
- Elevation AMSL: 257 ft (78 m)
- Coordinates: 53°21′14″N 2°16′30″W
- Website: www.manchesterairport.co.uk

Map
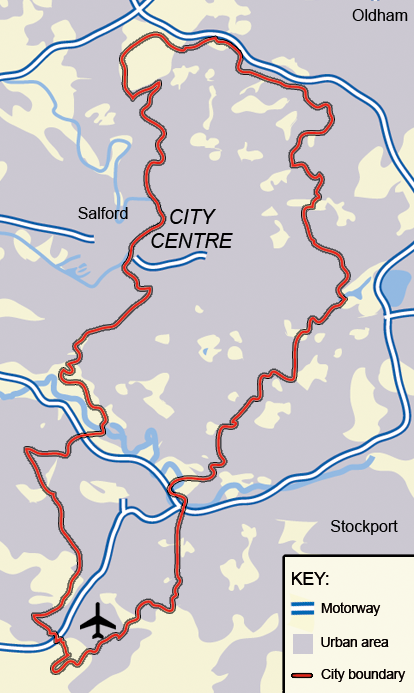
- Location within Manchester Location within Greater Manchester Location within the United Kingdom

Runways
Direction	Length		Surface
Direction	m	ft	Surface
05L/23R	3,048	10,000	Concrete
05R/23L	3,050	10,007	Concrete/ grooved asphalt

Statistics (2025)
- Passengers: 32,117,126
- Passenger change 24-25: ▲4.1%
- Aircraft movements: 203,212
- Movements change 24-25: ▲3.6%
- Sources: MAG Manchester Airports Group website, UK AIP at NATS; Statistics from the UK Civil Aviation Authority

Manchester Airport (IATA: MAN, ICAO: EGCC) is an international airport in Ringway, Manchester, England. It lies 7 miles (11 km) south-west of Manchester city centre. In 2025, it was the third-busiest airport in the United Kingdom in terms of passengers (the busiest outside London), and the 20th-busiest airport in Europe in 2024, with 32.1 million passengers served.

The airport comprises a cargo terminal and two passenger terminals – a £1.3 billion redevelopment programme will merge former Terminal 1 and current Terminal 3 in 2026. It covers an area of 560 hectares (1,400 acres) and has flights to 199 destinations, placing the airport thirteenth globally for total destinations served.

Officially opened on 25 June 1938, it was initially known as Ringway Airport. During the Second World War, as RAF Ringway, it was a base for the Royal Air Force. The airport is owned and managed by Manchester Airports Group (MAG), a group owned by the ten metropolitan borough councils of Greater Manchester, with Manchester City Council owning the largest stake, and the Australian finance house IFM Investors. Ringway, after which the airport was named, is a village with a few buildings and a church at the western edge of the airport.

In 2017, an eight-year redevelopment programme commenced which will culminate with the closure of Terminal 1 and enlargement of Terminal 2 to better facilitate transfers. The new terminal, completed in 2025, will take 80% of all passenger traffic. Terminal 3 will remain with a focus on low-cost, short-haul airlines.

== History ==
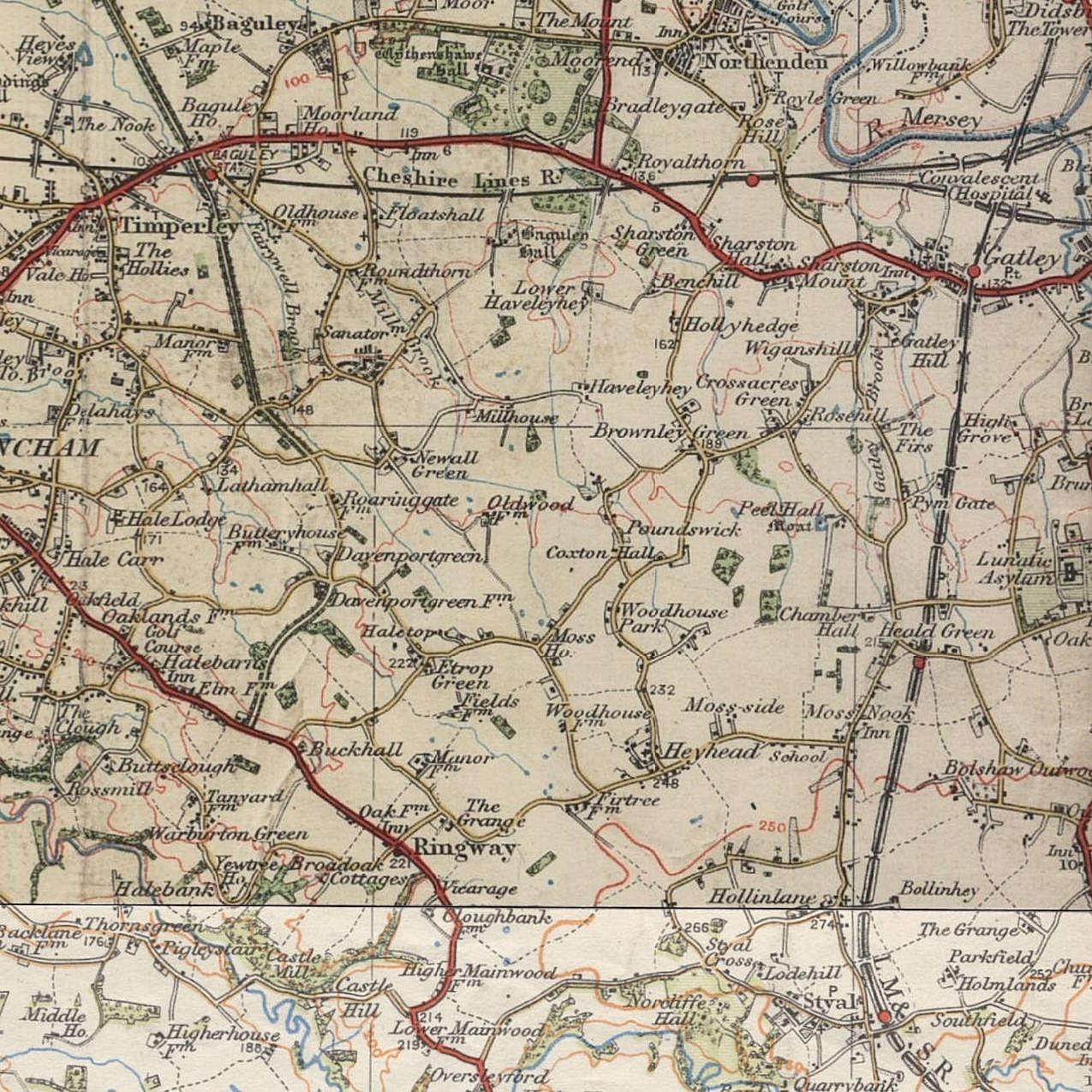
Map of the area where Manchester Airport is located, c. 1925

Construction commenced in Ringway parish on 28 November 1935 and the airport was partly operational by June 1937, with full construction completed on 25 June 1938. On 27 June 1938, KLM became the first airline to launch scheduled commercial flights to Manchester.

During the Second World War, RAF Ringway was important in military aircraft production and training parachutists. After the war, the base reverted to a civilian airport and gradually expanded to its present size. By the 1960s, Manchester was Britain's second-busiest airport (after Heathrow).

In 1946, Air France began operations from Manchester following the commencement of peacetime passenger services from the airport, and remains the airport's longest continuous operator, celebrating 75 years of service in 2021. In 1953, Manchester began 24-hour operation, with the ability to handle flights during the day and night, which helped the airport handle 163,000 passengers. 1953 also saw the start of intercontinental flights by Sabena Belgian to New York, followed closely by the launch of services to New York by BOAC.

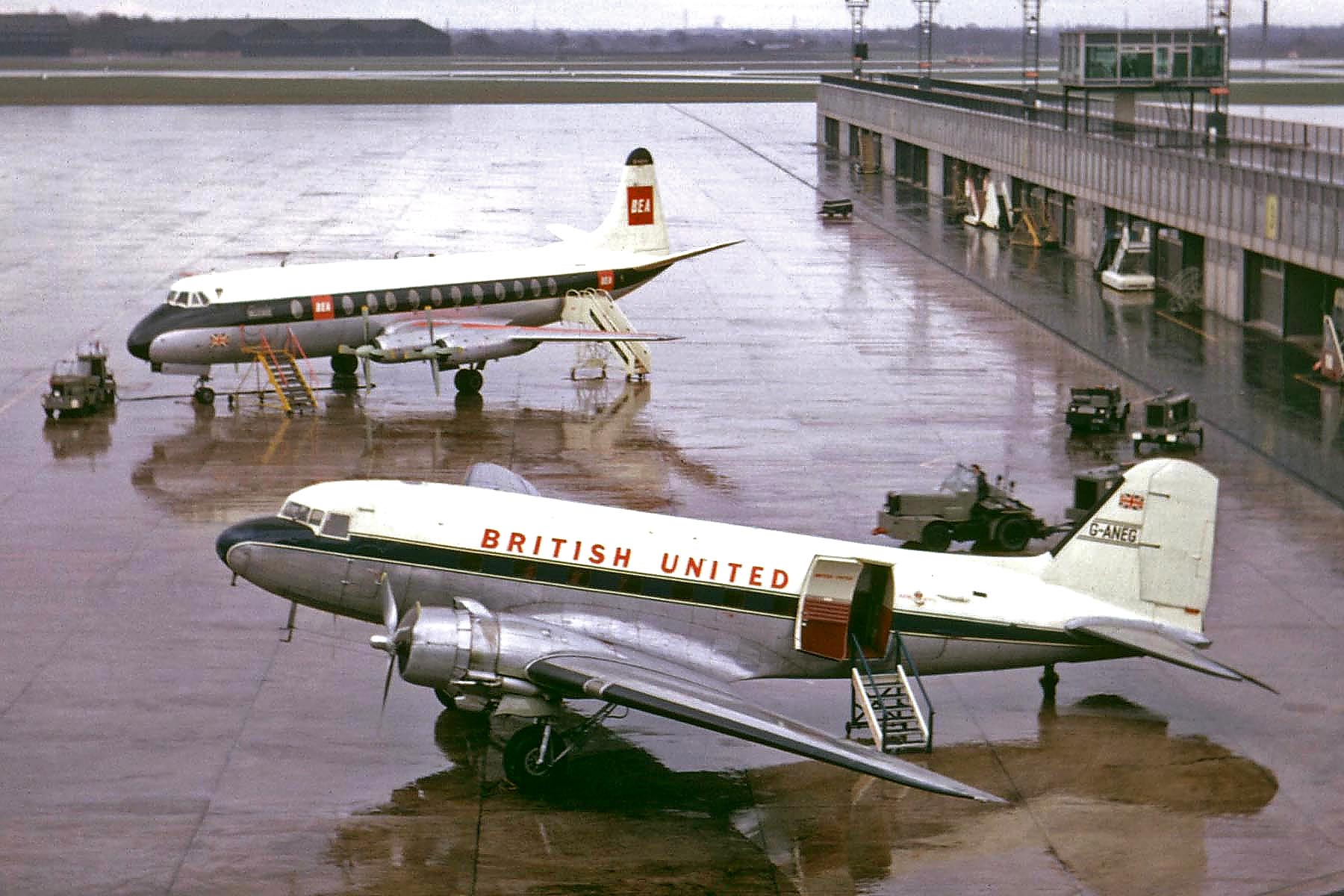
A British United Airways Douglas DC-3 and a British European Airways Vickers Viscount at the new terminal in 1963

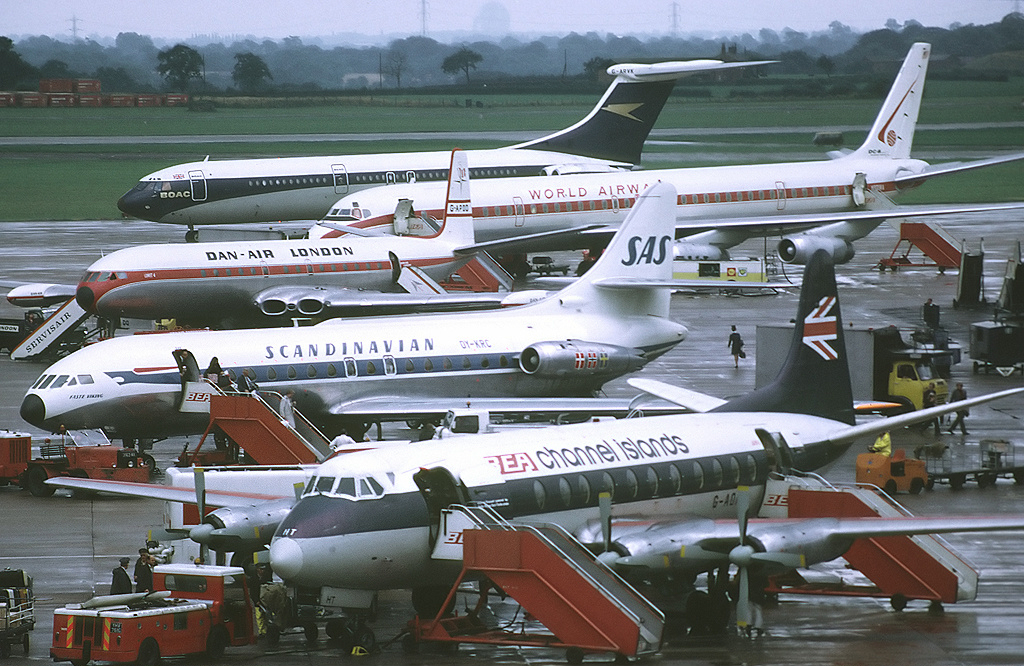
Apron view, 1972

The former RAF buildings were replaced by a new purpose-built passenger terminal, which opened in 1962. The new terminal featured a modern departures hall with large Venetian glass chandeliers and the first covered airport passenger piers in Europe.

The first transatlantic flights to originate at Manchester began in 1963. The thrice-weekly service was operated by BOAC using a Boeing 707 via Glasgow Prestwick. In 1969, the runway was extended to 2,745 metres (9,006 ft), allowing aircraft to take off with a full payload and to fly non-stop to Canada.

In 1971, the airport reached a milestone of handling over 2 million passengers in one year. The following year saw the opening of a link road connecting the airport to the M56 Motorway, improving road access from Manchester, Cheshire and North Wales. In 1975, Ringway was officially renamed Manchester International Airport.

The airport saw rapid growth and expansion during the 1980s and 1990s, shaping the airport for the coming decades. Many of the developments made during this period remain in place or have only recently been altered following the introduction of the Manchester Transformation Project. Passenger numbers continued to grow, reaching the milestone of handling one million passengers a month for the first time in 1987. This growth boosted expansion plans, including planning for a new terminal. The following year in 1988, Manchester celebrated its golden jubilee.

Terminal A, which now forms part of Terminal 3, was opened by Diana, Princess of Wales in 1989. In 1993, Terminal 2 was officially opened by the Duke of Edinburgh along with the official opening of Manchester Airport station. The main passenger terminal was redesignate Terminal 1. From 1997 to 2001, a second runway was constructed, causing large-scale protests in Cheshire, especially in the village of Styal where natural habitats were disturbed and listed buildings demolished to make space for construction.

During the early 2000s, British Airways scaled down operations from Manchester Airport with the sale of their BA Connect subsidiary to Flybe and the ending of their franchise agreement with GB Airways, a business subsequently sold to easyJet. In October 2008, the daily New York–JFK service was terminated and in March 2013 the daily to London–Gatwick was ended, although the service has resumed in recent years.

After taking over BA Connect's select routes, Flybe went on to add several more destinations. In 2012, Flybe introduced the "mini hub" concept co-ordinating the arrival and departure times of various domestic services throughout the day and thereby creating combinations such as Norwich–Manchester–Belfast, Glasgow–Manchester–Southampton and Edinburgh–Manchester–Exeter with conveniently short transfer times.

The Airbus A380 arrived in 2010, operated by Emirates, which continues to operate the aircraft three times daily on its route to Dubai.

Manchester Airport celebrated its 75th anniversary in 2013. That year also saw the completion and opening of the newly constructed air traffic control tower – which is now located in an independent tower, not on top of the airport as previously – and Airport City Manchester gained planning approval.

In 2014, the Manchester Airport Metrolink route launched as part of the route expansion plans of the Manchester Metrolink tramway, aiding transport to and from the airport to the city centre.

In 2019, the first phase of the new Terminal 2 extension was completed, and Pier 1 opened on 1 April 2019. The second phase of the extension plan opened on 14 July 2021.

During the later part of the decade, Monarch Airlines, Thomas Cook Airlines and Flybe all entered administration and ceased operations, having a major impact on local employment and operations at Manchester, as well as leaving thousands of passengers stranded, many abroad. Monarch was an operator at Manchester between 1981 and 2017, operating short and medium flights to Europe, and had its own maintenance base at the airport. It entered administration and ceased operations in 2017. Thomas Cook Airlines was a major operator at Manchester, operating scheduled and charter flights to over 50 destinations in Europe, America and the Caribbean. Its parent company also had a maintenance base at the airport. The airline entered compulsory liquidation in September 2019, with many aircraft left parked at the airport while payment disputes were concluded. Flybe was a British airline with a significant base at Manchester, which provided more than half of UK domestic flights outside London. Plans were formulated by a consortium Including Stobart Air and Virgin Atlantic to save FlyBe with the launch of Connect Airways, but plans were dropped in early 2020 and all operations ceased.

Like most British and international airports, Manchester has been severely affected by the global COVID-19 pandemic and the subsequent reduction in air passengers. A number of airlines ceased, paused or reduced routes to the airport. The reduced passenger numbers saw the temporary closure of both Terminals 2 and 3. In late 2020 American Airlines announced that its daily flights to Philadelphia would cease operation amid ongoing travel disruption caused by the Coronavirus outbreak. The departure of American Airlines also marked the final US-based airline at Manchester. American Airlines had previously operated services to New York–JFK, Chicago, Dallas, Miami, Boston, and Charlotte. Data recorded and published by the Civil Aviation Authority (CAA) show that during the first 11 months (January through November) of 2020, passenger 'Terminal & Transit' numbers dropped from 29,374,282 in 2019 to 6,787,127 in 2020.

== Future ==
As part of the Government's Future of Air Transport white paper, Manchester Airport published its Master Plan on its proposed expansions. Demolition of older buildings, such as old storage buildings, the old Alpha Catering Building and Males Garage, to the east of Terminal 2 has already begun, to make way for a new apron and taxiway towards runway 05L/23R and an eastwards extension of Terminal 2, which is planned to provide fifteen more covered stands.

The World Logistics Hub is also part of the Airport City Enterprise Developments in south Manchester. This development is designed to meet the growing demand for cargo handling space and infrastructure outside the southeast. Positioned on the southwest side of the A538 road, next to the southeast side of the M56 motorway across the A538 from the World Freight Terminal, it provides access to the trunk motorway network via Junction 6.

Manchester Airport has development plans to meet the growing demand to fly. One document, "The Need for Land", outlines several development ideas. Five affected areas are:

- Area A is a triangle of land between the A538 road and Runway 1 and the cargo terminal which is currently under development. It will be used together with Area E, a triangle of land west of the A538 up to the M56, with its west corner opposite Warburton Green, for the expansion of aircraft maintenance, vehicle maintenance/storage and cargo handling. The Clough Bank and Cotterill Clough areas are being enhanced with mitigation areas that will become part of the extensive Landscape Habitat Management Area. The A538 alignment to be retained and capacity has been added, as required, to meet increased traffic volumes.
- Area B is north of Ringway Road and east of Shadow Moss Road, and a car park has been provided to replace spaces lost to the Airport City development and apron/terminal expansion.
- Area C consists of several areas of land mainly inside the M56/M56 spur junction, around Hasty Lane east of M56 and around the current M56 spur. The land will be used for hotels and office space. Terminal 1's current capacity is around 11 million passengers a year, compared with an annual capacity of 2.5 million passengers when it first opened.

In the summer of 2009, a £50 million redevelopment programme for Terminal 1 was completed, as well as the construction of new car parking facilities and taxiways for aircraft.

- Area D consists of areas of land on both sides of Manchester Airport railway spur, at Smithy Farm and east of B5166 Styal Road around and inside railway spur junction where car parking, offices, hotels, etc. can be developed.

== Passenger terminals ==
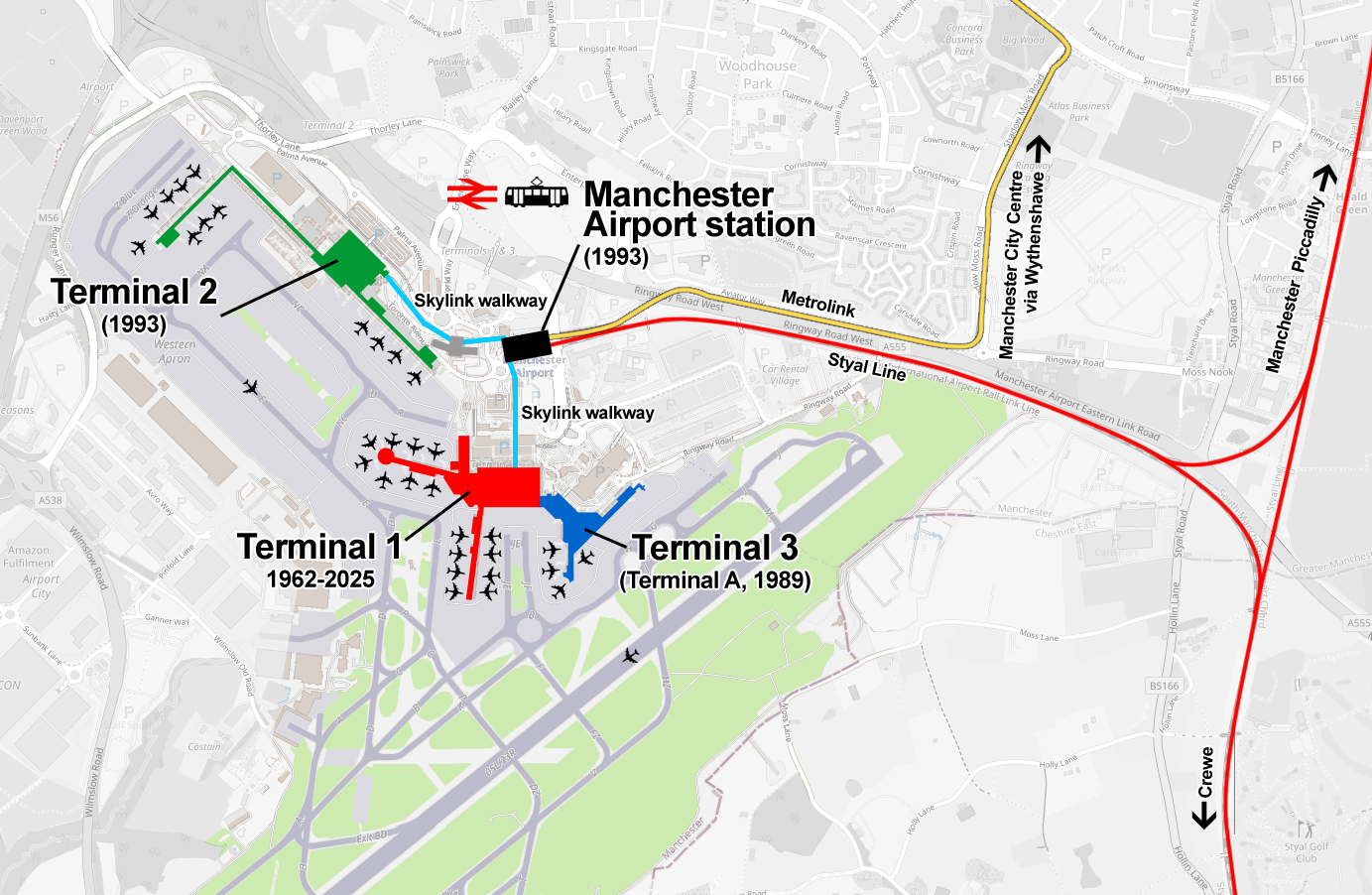
Map of Manchester Airport terminals with public transport links

Manchester Airport has two passenger terminals (Terminals 2 and 3). Terminals 2 and 3 are linked by the skylink, with travelators to aid passengers with the 10–15-minute walk. The skylink also connects the terminals to the airport railway station complex (known as The Station) and the Radisson BLU Hotel. Skylink 1 started construction in 1991 and opened 1993. Skylink 2 opened in September 1996 along with the Radisson.

=== Current terminals ===
==== Terminal 2 ====
Terminal 2 opened on 5 March 1993 by Prince Philip, Duke of Edinburgh, who had also opened Terminal 1 31 years earlier. It is used by the majority of airlines at Manchester, operating both charter and scheduled flights to many European and worldwide destinations, and is a base for EasyJet, Jet2.com, TUI Airways and Virgin Atlantic.

Upon its opening, Terminal 2 was spread over an area of 52,000 m^{2} (560,000 sq ft) and had 16 gates, of which 14 had airbridges, and had a capacity of around 8 million passengers a year. In 2007, an £11 million project commenced to redevelop Terminal 2 by improving security facilities and enhancing retail and catering services.

The design of the terminal made it capable of extensive expansion, and in June 2015 it was announced that Terminal 2 would receive a major expansion, a project that was planned to take 10 years to complete. The expansion included new piers and a larger security hall as well as more outlets. and would increase the terminal's capacity to handle 25 million passengers a year.

The first phase of the new extension, Pier 1, opened on 1 April 2019. The second phase, the terminal extension, was due to open in April 2020 but was delayed due to the impacts of the COVID-19 pandemic, finally opening on 14 July 2021. The third phase, which was announced on 25 January 2023, includes the refurbishment of the existing Terminal 2 featuring a brand new security hall, and also includes the construction of Pier 2. The new security hall opened on 22 May 2025 and a section of the refurbished terminal opened on 28 July 2025. The remainder of the refurbished terminal and the new pier, Pier 2, opened in late 2025.

==== Terminal 3 ====
Terminal 3 was opened in 1989 by Diana, Princess of Wales as Terminal A, as it was then known. It opened as a self contained new domestic terminal to replace the original pier A. It had many names before its expansion and re-designation as Terminal 3 in May 1998. The terminal was known in succession as "Terminal A"; "Terminal A – Domestic"; "Terminal 1A" after Terminal 2 opened in 1993; "Terminal 1A – British Airways and Domestic"; "Terminal 3 – British Airways and Domestic" before becoming simply known as Terminal 3 in 1998. In June 1998, British Airways opened their new £75 million terminal facility designed by Grimshaw Architects, this being a major extension to Terminal A and became the primary user of the terminal along with codeshare partner airlines (Oneworld). Today, Terminal 3 is home to and is a base for Ryanair. Formerly, it was home to most domestic flights operating out of Manchester. Terminal 3 now spreads over an area of 44,400 m^{2} (478,000 sq ft).

On 13 May 2025, it was announced that Terminal 3 would receive a multi-million pound refurbishment and expansion. The project includes the relocation of the entrance and the expansion of the departure lounge using existing space from Terminal 1. The existing Terminal 3 Check-In and Security area was closed on 20 October 2025, with flights moving over to the existing Terminal 1 entrance the following day. The existing Terminal 1 entrance as well as the Security and World Duty Free areas were rebranded as Terminal 3 on 5 March 2026.

==== Aether Private Terminal ====
Work began on the private terminal (adjacent to the Runway visitor park) in 2019 and it opened on 21 October 2019. The terminal had closed during the COVID pandemic, and re-opened on 4 November 2024.

=== Former terminals ===
==== Terminal 1 ====
Terminal 1 was opened in 1962 by Prince Philip, Duke of Edinburgh. It was used by airlines with scheduled and charter operations, flying to European and other worldwide destinations, and before its closure was a base for easyJet. Terminal 1 is spread over an area of 110,000 m^{2} (1,200,000 sq ft).

The terminal had two piers which combined have 29 stands, of which 15 have airbridges. Gate 12 was specially adapted to accommodate the Airbus A380, which is operated by Emirates on their route three times per day from Dubai to Manchester. Terminal 1's current capacity was around 11 million passengers a year, compared with an annual capacity of 2.5 million passengers when it first opened.

In mid-2009, a £50 million redevelopment programme for Terminal 1 was completed, which included a new £14 million 14-lane security area.

In 2023, it was announced that Terminal 1 was not planned to be included in the ten-year airport expansion project, and would shut in 2025 when the new Terminal 2 was completed. On 13 May 2025, it was announced that MAG had planned to use some of the space in Terminal 1, including the entrance, to expand and improve Terminal 3. The majority of Terminal 1 closed on 19 November 2025, aside from the entrance, security and World Duty Free areas, which were rebranded as Terminal 3 on 5 March 2026.

== Airlines and destinations ==
=== Passenger ===
The following airlines operate regular scheduled and charter flights to and from Manchester:

Airlines	Destinations
Aegean Airlines	Athens
Aer Lingus	Belfast–City, Dublin
Air Algerie	Seasonal: Algiers
Air Canada	Toronto–Pearson
Air France	Paris–Charles de Gaulle
Air Transat	Toronto–Pearson
airBaltic	Seasonal: Kuusamo (begins 13 December 2026)
Aurigny	Guernsey
Biman Bangladesh Airlines	Dhaka, (Note: Dhaka service is a continuation of the Sylhet service as the same flight number) Sylhet
British Airways	London–Heathrow
Brussels Airlines	Brussels
Cathay Pacific	Hong Kong
Corendon Airlines	Seasonal: Antalya, Heraklion
easyJet	Agadir, Alicante, Amsterdam, Antalya, Athens, Barcelona, Basel/Mulhouse, Belfast–City, Belfast–International, Berlin, Bilbao, Bordeaux, Copenhagen, Dalaman, Djerba, Enfidha, Faro, Fuerteventura, Funchal, Geneva, Gibraltar, Gran Canaria, Hamburg, Hurghada, Isle of Man, Jersey, Kraków, Lanzarote, Lisbon, Ljubljana, Madrid, Málaga, Malta, Marrakesh, Milan–Linate, Milan–Malpensa, Munich, Nice, Oslo, Palma de Mallorca, Paphos, Paris–Charles de Gaulle, Pisa, Porto, Prague, Reykjavík–Keflavík, Rome–Fiumicino, Sal, Sharm El Sheikh, Tenerife–South, Venice, Verona, Zurich; Seasonal: Akureyri, Bari, Bodrum, Burgas, Catania, Chania, Corfu, Dubrovnik, Giza, Grenoble, Heraklion, Ibiza, Innsbruck, Izmir, Kalamata, Kefalonia, Kittilä, Kos, Larnaca, La Rochelle, Menorca, Montpellier, Murcia, Mykonos, Naples, Newquay, Preveza/Lefkada, Rennes, Reus, Rhodes, Rovaniemi, Sälen-Trysil, Santorini, Skiathos, Sofia, Split, Strasbourg, Thessaloniki, Tivat, Tromsø, Turin, Zakynthos
Egyptair	Cairo
Emirates	Dubai–International
Ethiopian Airlines	Addis Ababa, Geneva
Etihad Airways	Abu Dhabi
Eurowings	Düsseldorf, Hamburg, Stuttgart
Finnair	Helsinki
Gulf Air	Bahrain
Hainan Airlines	Beijing–Capital
Iberia Express	Madrid
Icelandair	Reykjavík–Keflavík
Jet2.com	Agadir, Alicante, Antalya, Athens, Barcelona, Budapest, Faro, Fuerteventura, Funchal, Gran Canaria, Hurghada (begins 14 February 2027), Kraków, Lanzarote, Málaga, Malta, Marrakesh, Paphos, Paris–Charles de Gaulle (begins 25 March 2027), Porto, Prague, Rome–Fiumicino, Sharm El Sheikh (begins 13 February 2027), Tenerife–South, Venice, Verona; Seasonal: Almería, Bergen, Bergerac (begins 22 May 2027), Berlin, Bodrum, Burgas, Catania, Chambéry, Chania, Cologne/Bonn, Corfu, Dalaman, Dubrovnik, Enfidha (begins 1 May 2027), Gdańsk, Geneva, Girona, Grenoble, Heraklion, Ibiza, Innsbruck, Izmir, Jerez de la Frontera, Jersey (begins 1 May 2027), Kalamata, Kavala (begins 11 May 2027), Kefalonia, Kos, Larnaca, La Rochelle (begins 22 May 2027), Lyon, Menorca, Mytilene, Naples, Nice, Olbia, Palermo, Palma de Mallorca, Perpignan (begins 2 May 2027), Pisa, Preveza/Lefkada, Pula, Reus, Reykjavík–Keflavík, Rhodes, Salzburg, Samos, Santorini, Skiathos, Split, Strasbourg (begins 26 November 2026), Thessaloniki, Tivat, Turin, Vienna, Zakynthos
Juneyao Air	Shanghai–Pudong
KLM	Amsterdam
Kuwait Airways	Kuwait City
Loganair	Aberdeen, Inverness, Isle of Man, Kirkwall, (Note: Kirkwall service is a continuation of the Inverness service as the same flight number) Newquay, Sumburgh (Note: Sumburgh service is a continuation of the Inverness service as the same flight number)
Lufthansa	Frankfurt, Munich
Lufthansa City Airlines	Frankfurt, Munich
Luxair	Luxembourg
Norse Atlantic Airways	Seasonal: Bangkok–Suvarnabhumi; Seasonal charter: Antigua, Barbados
Norwegian Air Shuttle	Bergen, Copenhagen, Oslo, Stavanger; Seasonal: Billund (begins 1 April 2027), Stockholm–Arlanda, Tromsø
Pakistan International Airlines	Islamabad, Lahore
Pegasus Airlines	Istanbul–Sabiha Gökçen
Qatar Airways	Doha
Riyadh Air	Riyadh
Royal Air Maroc	Casablanca
Royal Jordanian	Amman–Queen Alia
Ryanair	Agadir, Alicante, Barcelona, Beauvais, Belfast–International, Bergamo, Berlin, Bratislava, Bucharest–Otopeni, Budapest, Carcassonne, Charleroi, Cologne/Bonn, Copenhagen, Derry, Dublin, Eindhoven, Faro, Fuerteventura, Funchal, Gdańsk, Gothenburg, Gran Canaria, Katowice, Kerry, Knock, Kraków, Lanzarote, Limoges, Lisbon, Madrid, Málaga, Malta, Marrakesh, Memmingen, Milan–Malpensa, Murcia, Nantes, Naples, Palma de Mallorca, Paphos, Pisa, Porto, Poznań, Prague, Rabat, Riga, Rome–Ciampino, Rzeszów, Sandefjord, Seville, Shannon, Tangier, Tenerife–South, Tirana, Toulouse, Valencia, Venice, Verona, Vienna, Warsaw–Chopin, Wrocław; Seasonal: Almería, Béziers, Brindisi, Castellón, Chania, Corfu, Dubrovnik, Genoa, Girona, Grenoble, Ibiza, Marseille, Menorca, Plovdiv, Reus, Rhodes, Rimini, Rovaniemi, Salzburg, Santander, Trapani, Turin, Zadar, Zagreb
Saudia	Jeddah
Scandinavian Airlines	Copenhagen, Oslo, Stockholm–Arlanda
Singapore Airlines	Singapore
SunExpress	Antalya, Izmir; Seasonal: Bodrum, Dalaman
Swiss International Air Lines	Zurich
TAP Air Portugal	Lisbon
TUI Airways	Agadir, Alicante, Boa Vista, Cancún, Enfidha, Fuerteventura, Gran Canaria, Hurghada, Lanzarote, La Palma, Málaga, Marrakesh, Montego Bay, Punta Cana, Sal, Sharm El Sheikh, Tenerife–South; Seasonal: Antalya, Banjul, Barbados, Budapest, Burgas, Chambéry, Chania, Corfu, Dalaman, Dubrovnik, Düsseldorf, Funchal, Geneva, Girona, Goa–Mopa, Heraklion, Ibiza, Innsbruck, Ivalo, Kajaani, Kavala, Kefalonia, Kittilä, Kos, Kuusamo, La Romana, Lamezia Terme, Larnaca, Luxor, Melbourne/Orlando, Menorca, Naples, Ohrid, Olbia, Oslo, Palma de Mallorca, Paphos, Phuket, Preveza/Lefkada, Pula, Reus, Reykjavík–Keflavík, Rhodes, Rovaniemi, Salzburg, Santorini, Skiathos, Sofia, Split, Thessaloniki, Toulouse, Turin, Verona, Vienna, Zakynthos
Turkish Airlines	Istanbul
Virgin Atlantic	Atlanta, New York–JFK, Orlando; Seasonal: Barbados
Vueling	Barcelona

=== Cargo ===
Airlines	Destinations
ASL Airlines France	Paris–Charles de Gaulle
FedEx Express	Paris–Charles de Gaulle

== Statistics ==
=== Annual statistics ===
	Passengers (Note: The number of domestic and international passengers)	Aircraft movements (Note: The number of total air transport takeoffs and landings)	Freight (tonnes)
1990	10,475,641	121,744	72,255
1991	10,463,667	124,269	66 045
1992	12,051,220	131,010	74,713
1993	13,099,080	135,406	84,087
1994	14,547,477	142,936	91,055
1995	14,732,034	146,107	79,876
1996	14,642,385	141,070	78,628
1997	15,948,454	147,405	94,318
1998	17,351,162	162,906	100,099
1999	17,577,765	169,941	107,803
2000	18,568,709	178,468	116,602
2001	19,307,011	182,097	106,406
2002	18,809,185	177,545	113,279
2003	19,699,256	191,518	122,639
2004	21,249,841	208,493	149,181
2005	22,402,856	217,987	147,484
2006	22,422,855	229,729	148,957
2007	22,112,625	222,703	165,366
2008	21,219,195	204,610	141,781
2009	18,724,889	172,515	102,543
2010	17,759,015	147,032	115,922
2011	18,892,756	158,025	107,415
2012	19,736,502	160,473	96,822
2013	20,751,581	161,306	96,373
2014	21,989,682	162,919	93,466
2015	23,136,047	164,710	100,021
2016	25,637,054	183,731	109,630
2017	27,791,274	203,631	123,576
2018	28,275,972	201,239	117,264
2019	29,397,357	202,892	108,382
2020	7,034,856	66,760	48,938
2021	6,085,103	60,376	52,564
2022	23,364,471	158,575	65,403
2023	28,077,659	180,246	67,830
2024	30,859,196	196,091	88,872
2025	32,117,126	203,212	95,917
^{Source: United Kingdom Civil Aviation Authority}

Manchester Airport annual movements, 1990–2024 (thousands)
Updated: 16 February 2024

=== Busiest routes ===
Busiest domestic routes to and from Manchester in 2025
Rank	Airport	Total passengers	Change 2024/25	Airline(s)
1	London–Heathrow	606,085	▼3.7%	British Airways
2	Belfast–International	550,729	▲1.3%	easyJet, Ryanair
3	Belfast–City	209,986	▼6.1%	Aer Lingus Regional, easyJet
4	Isle of Man	122,810	▲1.3%	easyJet, Loganair
5	Jersey	80,667	▼12.0%	easyJet, Jet2
6	Guernsey	67,172	▲9.8%	Aurigny
7	City of Derry	53,895	▼7.7%	Ryanair
8	Aberdeen	53,233	▼14.4%	Loganair
9	Newquay	50,287	▲3.6%	easyJet, Loganair
10	Inverness	28,004	▲0.1%	Loganair

Busiest international routes to and from Manchester in 2025
Rank	Airport	Total passengers	Change 2024/25	Airline(s)
1	Dubai–International	1,185,732	▼9.3%	Emirates
2	Dublin	1,145,530	▲7.5%	Aer Lingus, Ryanair
3	Amsterdam	1,092,515	▲1.2%	easyJet, KLM
4	Tenerife–South	929,823	▼3.4%	easyJet, Jet2.com, Ryanair, TUI Airways
5	Alicante	920,655	▲2.7%	easyJet, Jet2.com, Ryanair, TUI Airways
6	Paris–Charles de Gaulle	776,878	▲9.1%	Air France, easyJet
7	Palma de Mallorca	735,711	▼2.8%	easyJet, Jet2.com, Ryanair, TUI Airways
8	Doha	722,508	▲4.7%	Qatar Airways
9	Antalya	705,128	▼2.0%	Corendon Airlines, easyJet, Jet2.com, Pegasus Airlines, SunExpress, TUI Airways
10	Málaga	614,304	▲0.8%	easyJet, Jet2.com, Ryanair, TUI Airways
11	Barcelona	559,523	▲7.1%	easyJet, Jet2.com, Ryanair, Vueling
12	Lanzarote	518,555	▼4.6%	easyJet, Jet2.com, Ryanair, TUI Airways
13	Istanbul	484,382	▲12.4%	Turkish Airlines
14	Dalaman	482,975	▼13.9%	easyJet, Ryanair
15	Faro	480,650	▲2.1%	easyJet, Jet2.com, Ryanair
16	Copenhagen	437,339	▲2.3%	easyJet, Norwegian Air Shuttle, Ryanair, SAS
17	Abu Dhabi	391,874	▲60.3%	Etihad Airways
18	Orlando	364,169	▲4.3%	Virgin Atlantic
19	Lisbon	360,155	▼0.8%	easyJet, Ryanair, TAP Air Portugal
20	Frankfurt	349,350	▼4.6%	Lufthansa

== Operations ==
=== Maintenance bases ===
Manchester Airport is the home to the engineering base of Jet2.com and, up until 23 September 2019, it was also the engineering base of the Thomas Cook Group Airlines. Airlines such as Etihad Airways also have one of six maintenance bases worldwide in Manchester with their newly opened (2011) line maintenance facility.

=== World Freight Terminal ===
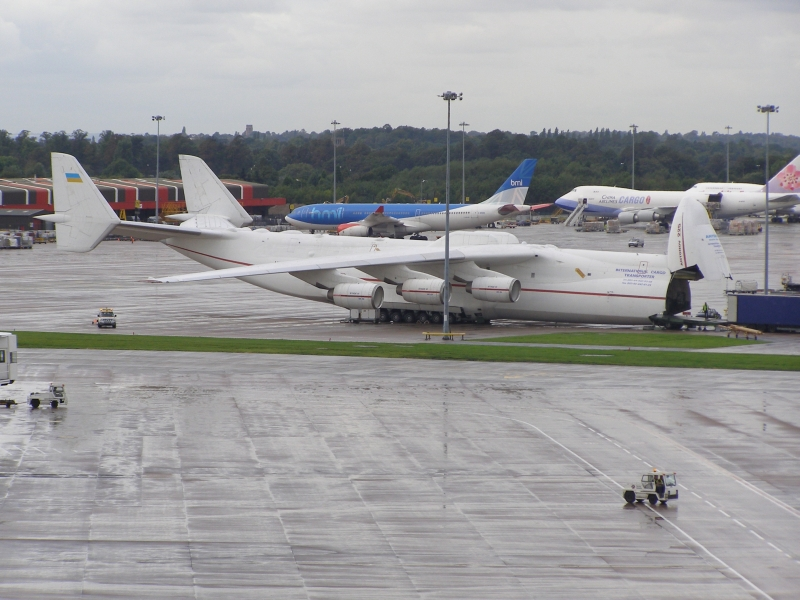
Antonov An-225 at Manchester Airport in 2006

Manchester Airport has a World Freight Terminal, serving cargo-only freighter services and cargo carried on regular passenger flights. It was opened in 1986, west of the original airfield. There are 5,500,000 sq ft (510,000 m^{2}) of warehouse and office space on site, including a chiller unit for frozen products and a border inspection post. There are three aircraft maintenance hangars, with five transit sheds, operated by British Airways World Cargo, Swissport Cargo, Menzies World Cargo, and dnata UK. There are over 100 freight forwarding companies on site.

Freight throughput at the airport grew from 94,000 tonnes in 1997 to the peak at 165,000 tonnes in 2007, but then declined to around 93,000 tonnes in 2013, subsequently increasing to over 109,000 tonnes in 2016 making Manchester the fourth-busiest UK airport for freight behind London–Heathrow, East Midlands and London–Stansted airports.

=== Runways ===
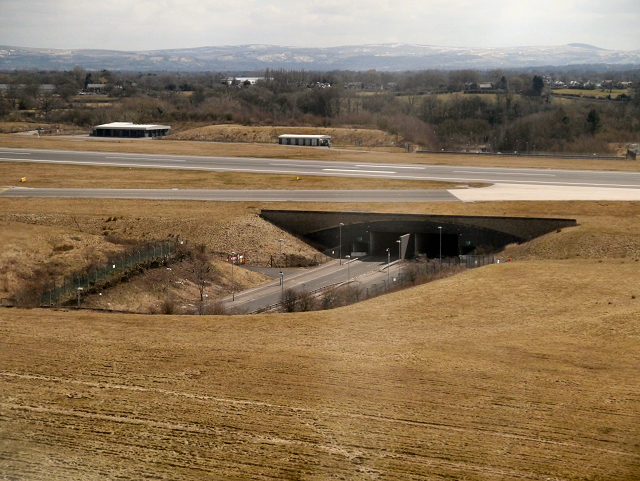
The A538 road runs beneath both runways via two separate tunnels. Part of the road is exposed between both runways.

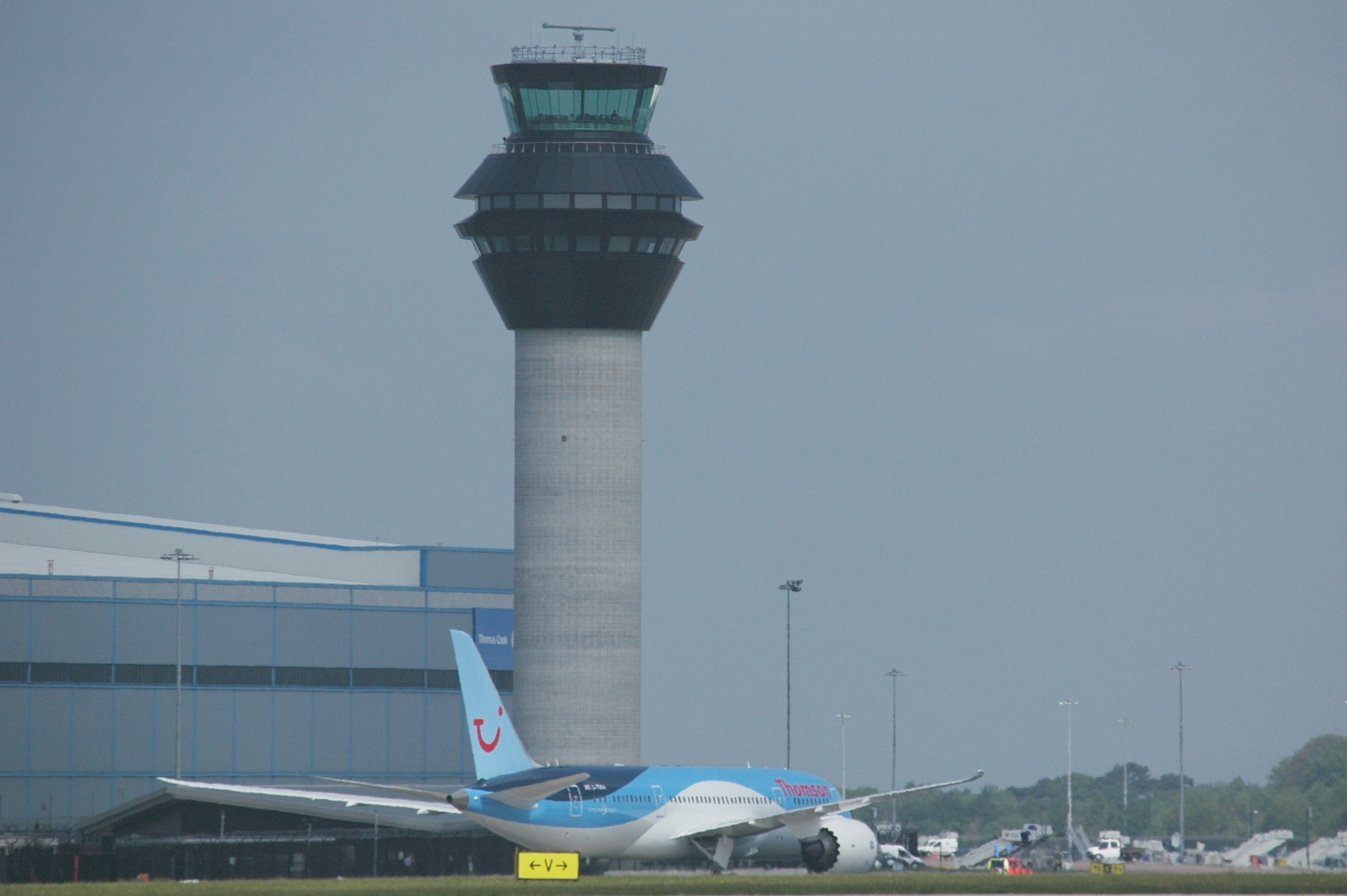
The new control tower, opened in June 2013, with a Tui Airways Boeing 787 Dreamliner taxiing in at the end of its delivery flight

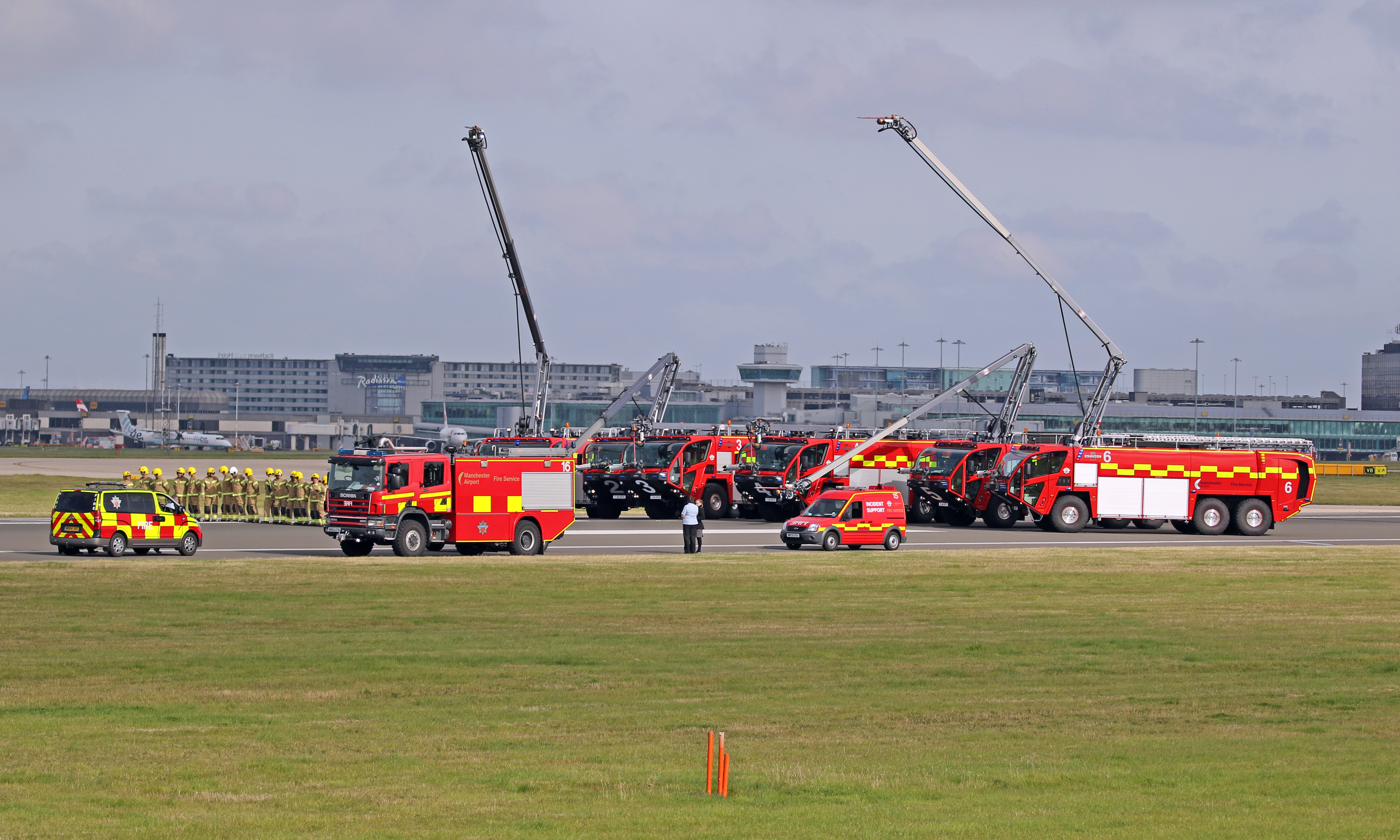
Manchester Airport Fire Service

Manchester Airport has two parallel runways. Runway 1 (23R/05L) 3,048 m × 45 m (10,000 ft × 148 ft) and Runway 2 (23L/05R) 3,200 m × 45 m (10,499 ft × 148 ft). The parallel runways lie 390 m (1,280 ft) apart and staggered by 1,850 m (6,070 ft) so that landings can be conducted independently on one runway whilst takeoffs are conducted on the other.

The original main runway, then designated 06/24 and initially 3,300 ft (1,006 m) in length, opened on 17 May 1937 when the airport was used as an RAF base and a military aircraft assembly centre. It was extended in stages from 1952, reaching its current length in 1981 to attract long-haul international traffic. The runway extensions necessitated acquisition of land and diversions of local infrastructure. When the runway was extended in 1968–69, the A538 road (Wilmslow Road) was diverted via a tunnel beneath the runway. When the runway was further extended in 1981–82, the road was again diverted through a pair of tunnels further south and the River Bollin was re-routed through a culvert under the runway.

As demand and aircraft movements both increased during the mid-1990s, mainly due to the newly completed Terminal 2, the airport studied the option of a second full-length runway. A consultation process began and planning permission was approved in 1997, with construction work starting the same year. The second runway, initially designated 06R/24L, became operational on 5 February 2001 at a cost of £172 million, and was the first full-length commercial runway to open in Britain for over 20 years. The site where the second runway was constructed was on the southern airfield boundary, which is near the village of Styal in the Cheshire countryside. The project was deemed controversial because of the destruction of natural wildlife habitats and because of changes to flight paths to enable aircraft to fly in and out of the second runway. Aircraft landing from the southwest on to Runway 2 (05R) fly lower over the residential area of Knutsford. As aircraft rarely land on to Runway 2 from the northeast (Runway 23L) or takeoff from Runway 2 to the northeast (Runway 05R) there has been no change to the path of aircraft over Heald Green, Cheadle and Stockport.

Planning permission for Runway 2 (23L/05R) permits use of both runways between the hours of 06:00–22:00. At night between the hours of 22:00–06:00 single runway operations based on Runway 1 (23R/05L) are used. Exceptions are made for emergencies and planned maintenance. In practice, dual runway operations incorporating Runway 2 (23L/05R) are only used at peak demand, which is currently in the morning and then again between 13:00–20:00.

Most aircraft arriving at Manchester Airport use the instrument landing system, which in line with most other airports has a glide slope of 3 degrees, equal to descending 318 feet (97 m) per nautical mile. The prevailing wind direction is westerly, so normally aircraft fly from northeast to southwest. In practice this means that normally aircraft land from the northeast over Stockport, Cheadle and Heald Green, and take off towards Knutsford. In dual runway operations, aircraft will usually land on to Runway 1 (23R) and depart from Runway 2 (23L). When the wind direction changes, usually affecting 20% of movements per annum, operations are reversed with aircraft landing from the southwest, lining up to the south over Northwich and over Knutsford and taking off towards Stockport. In dual runway operations aircraft will usually land on to Runway 2 (05R) and depart from Runway 1 (05L). Sometimes, aircraft arriving into Manchester Airport are held in stacks, usually in poor weather when the movement rate decreases. The airport has three stacks: DAYNE, MIRSI and ROSUN, each located approximately 15/20 miles from the airport. DAYNE serves arrivals from the south, ROSUN from the north and east and MIRSI from the west. Residents living within 20 miles (32 km) of the airport will probably see and hear aircraft.

=== Control tower ===
A new control tower was opened on 25 June 2013. At 60 m (200 ft) tall, it is the UK's second-tallest control tower, after that at London Heathrow. It replaced the old tower on top of Terminal 1.

=== Security ===
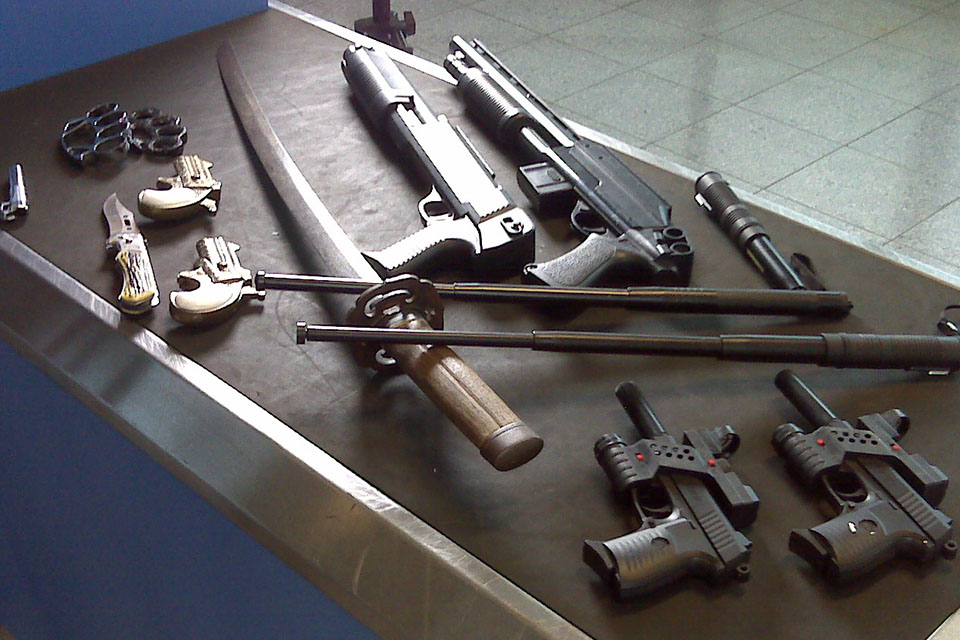
Selection of weapons and replicas collected by security officers at Manchester Airport in 2013

Manchester Airport is policed by the Greater Manchester Police and Manchester Airport Fire Service. Several security-related incidents have occurred at the airport in recent years.

- In 2002, a security firm successfully smuggled fake explosives, detonators and genuine firearms onto a flight.
- In 2004, the BBC's Whistleblower programme revealed security failures at the airport, including faulty metal detectors and a lack of regular random baggage checks.
- In 2005, police used a taser on a man spotted acting suspiciously on the apron, after he appeared to resist arrest.
- On 6 June 2006, Aabid Hussain Khan, 21, of West Yorkshire and a 16-year-old boy were arrested at the airport and later charged under Section 57 of the Terrorism Act, for conspiracy to murder and conspiracy to cause public nuisance by using poisons or explosives.
- On 24 July 2012, an 11-year-old boy went straight through security and managed to board the nearest boarding flight from security in T1, which was a Jet2 flight to Rome. Halfway through the flight one passenger reported him to the cabin crew, who then detained the boy at Rome and put him on the next flight back to Manchester.
- On 5 August 2014, a 47-year-old man was arrested after the pilot of a plane became aware of a potential explosive device on board. This turned out to be a hoax. As a result, Manchester Airport airfield operations were suspended for around 30 minutes whilst the man was led away by armed police. The incident required an escort from an RAF Typhoon jet into Manchester.
- In April 2015, the passengers arriving from Madrid on a Ryanair flight entered the UK without having their passports checked. A spokesman for the airport said it was the responsibility of the airline's handling agent to notify the UK Border Force about flights from outside the UK.
- In November 2017, the passengers arriving on an EasyJet flight from Paris were mistakenly directed to departures rather than arrivals. The situation was caused by a door that was opened by a staff member, which led to the cross-contamination of arriving and departing passengers. The security breach resulted in confusion and delays, with a spokesman for the Department of Transport stating that it is the responsibility of airlines and airport operators to ensure passengers arriving in the UK are directed through the correct route.
- 2024 Manchester Airport brawl; On 23 July 2024, Mohammed Fahir Amaaz went to the airport to pick up his mother, and headbutted a member of the public whom he alleged had racially abused her. When Amaaz and his brother were being arrested, they resisted and assaulted the police, with Amaaz breaking the nose of one female police officer and punching another. He was convicted in July 2025. A short video clip of the arrest, showing a third police officer kicking Amaaz in the head after his three assaults, had been spread on social media, leading to protests and allegations of police brutality.

== Ground transport ==
=== Railway ===
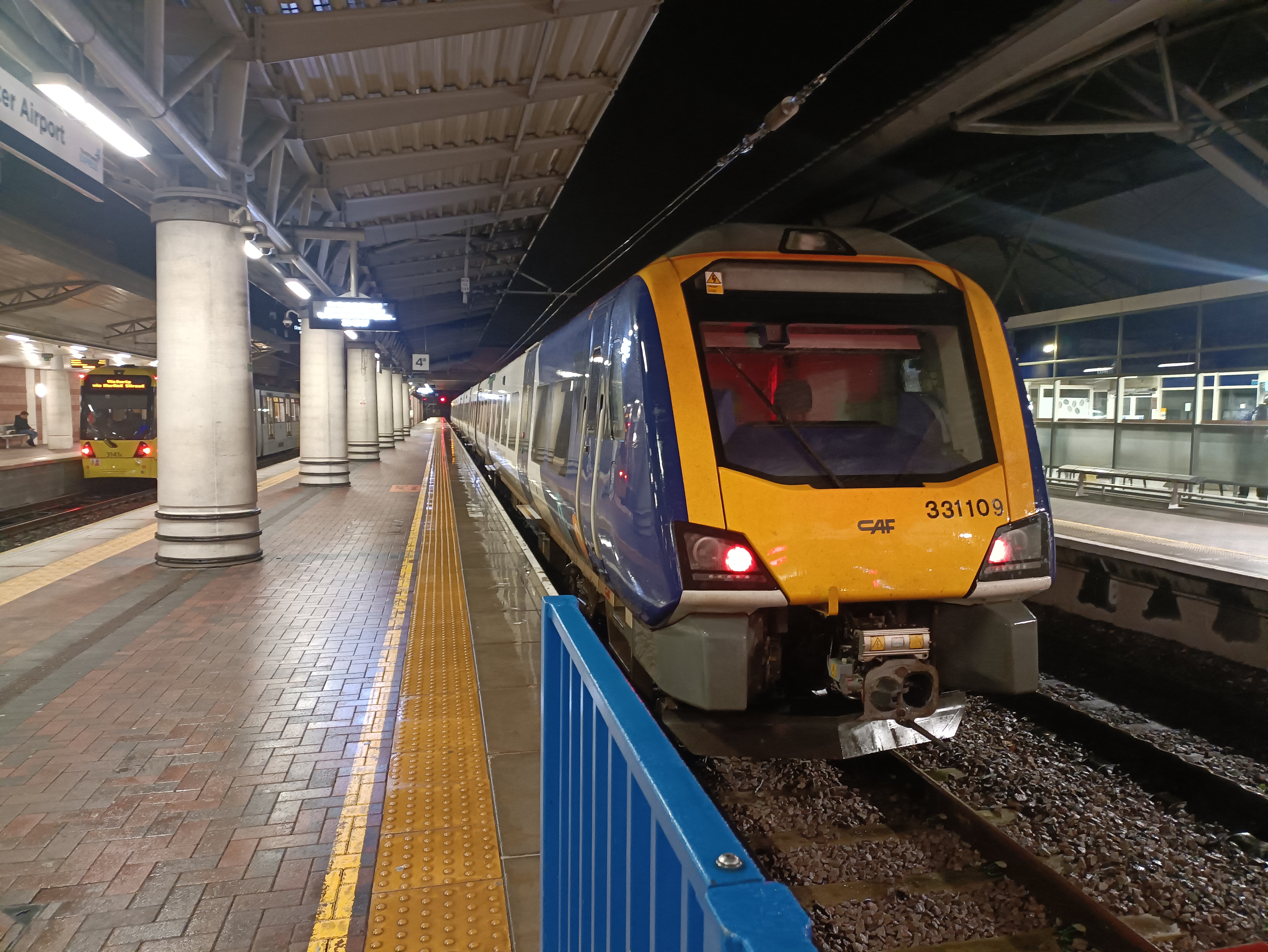
A Northern Trains electric multiple unit on platform 4b arriving from Manchester Piccadilly

Manchester Airport station opened in May 1993. It lies between Terminals 1 and 2, linked to them by a Skylink moving walkway. Services are operated by Northern Trains, TransPennine Express and Transport for Wales, which connect the airport to Manchester Piccadilly, Crewe, Wigan North Western and Blackpool North in north-west England; Edinburgh Waverley and Glasgow Central in Scotland; and Holyhead and Llandudno in Wales.

A third platform was completed in 2008 to allow for an increase in rail capacity. In 2009, Network Rail stated that the third platform meant that capacity will become constrained by the layover of the trains and recommended building a line underneath the airport towards Northwich by 2024. Work on building a new fourth platform at the station commenced in early 2014, with a blockade required in February 2015 to allow completion. Construction finished in May 2015 and the platform opened to passengers in autumn 2015.

=== Metrolink ===
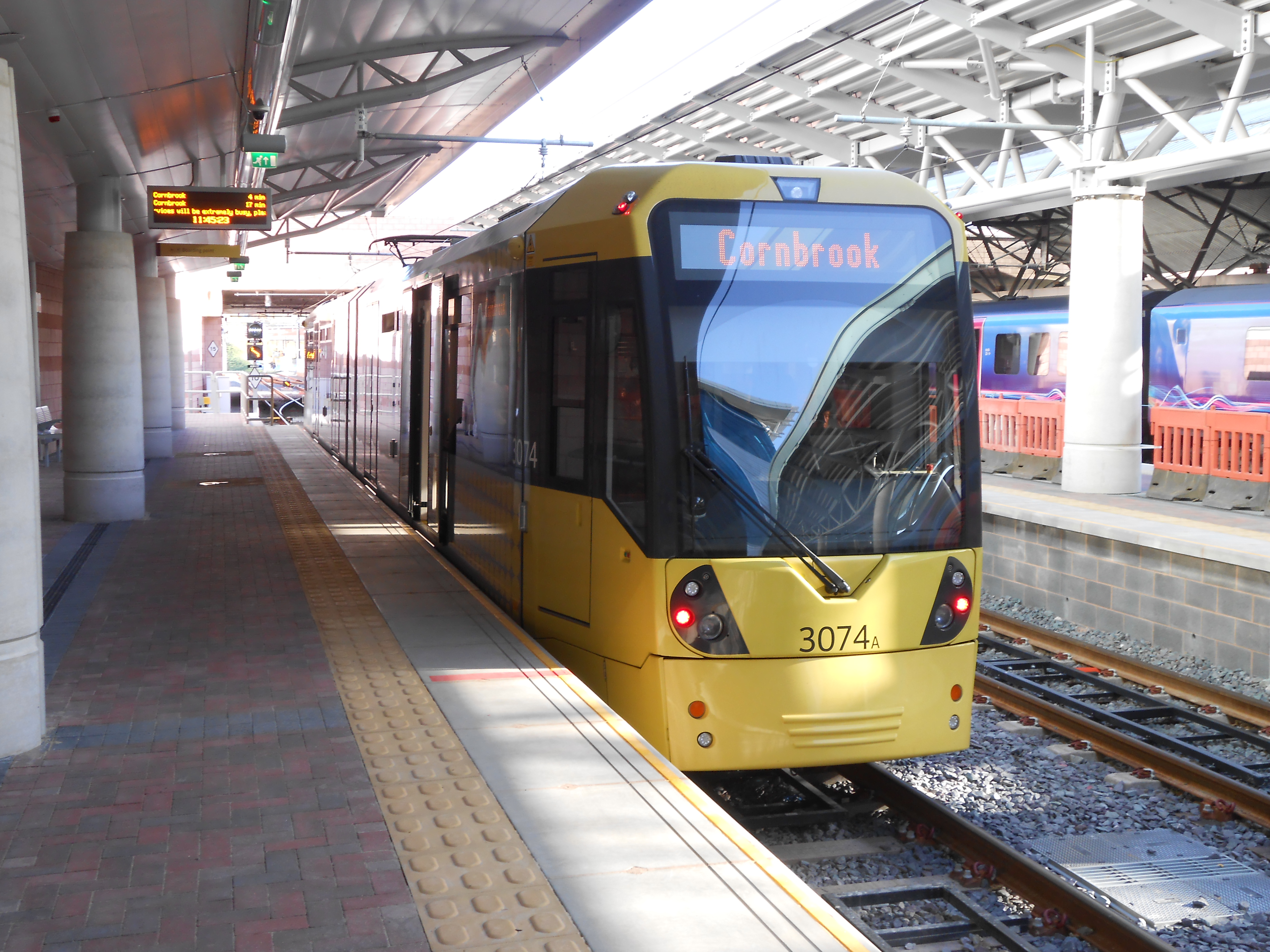
A tram at Manchester Airport in November 2014, shortly after the line opened

A Metrolink service from Cornbrook station to the Airport opened in November 2014 and runs at 12-minute frequency. Journeys along the 15-stop line from Cornbrook take approximately 35 minutes. The Manchester Metrolink light rail system has had plans to extend to the airport for many years. When the idea of a congestion charge was mooted, part of the scheme was to have extended the Metrolink to the airport. However, when this was rejected, the future of the scheme was in doubt. In 2009, it was announced that the line to the airport would finally be built.

The Airport Line is one spur of the line from St Werburgh's Road to East Didsbury and Manchester Airport, which opened on 3 November 2014 – 18 months ahead of schedule. As of November 2022, Metrolink services from the Airport operate to Manchester Victoria, via Market Street.

=== Buses and coaches ===
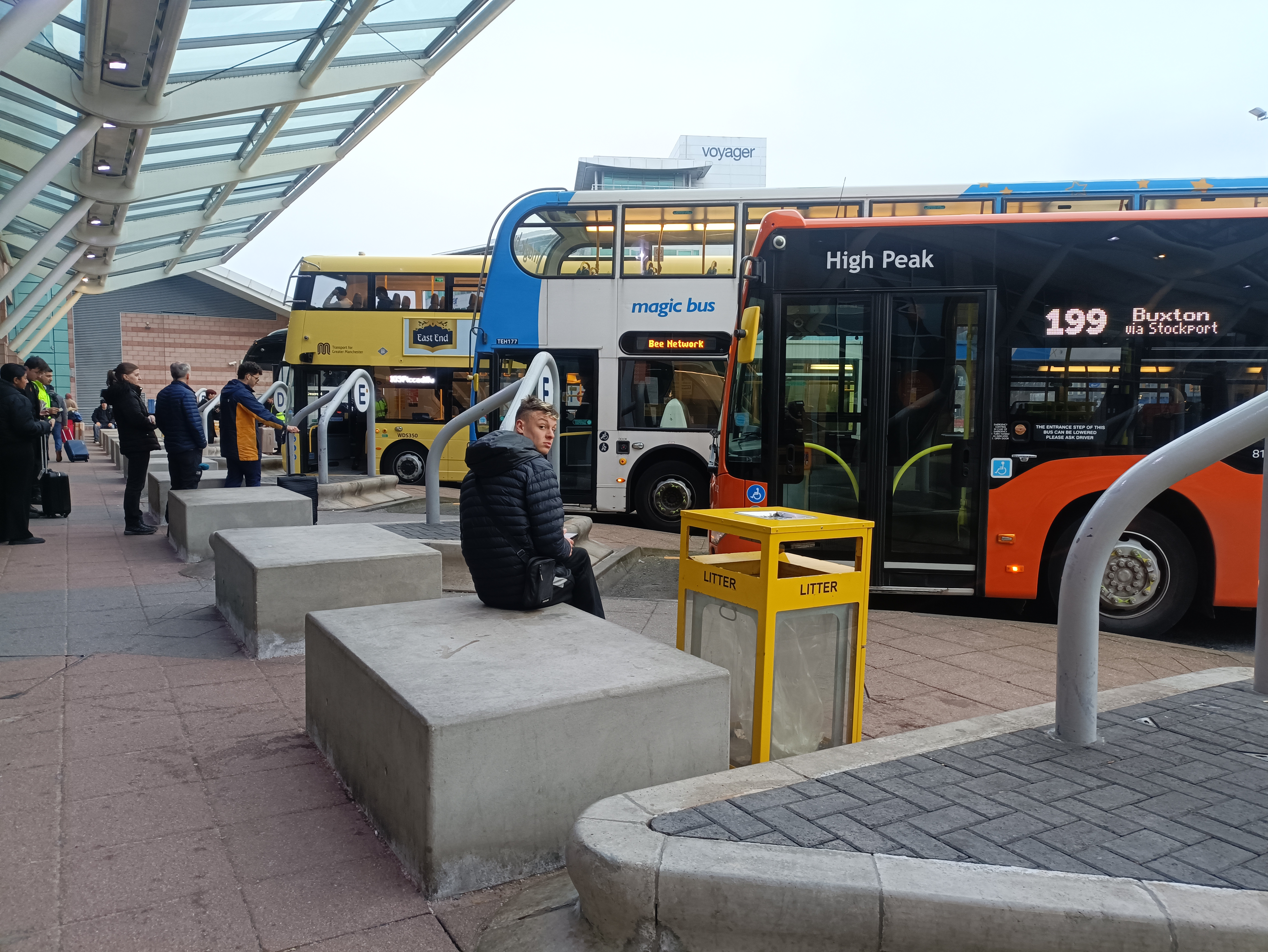
Buses in the bus station in 2026

The Station is the airport's ground transport interchange and brings bus, coach and rail passengers under one roof. Over 300 trains, 100 coaches and 500 buses a day use the facility, including the 24-hour bus service 43, which runs every 10 minutes (every 30 minutes at night) to Manchester city centre via Wythenshawe, Northenden, Withington, Fallowfield and Rusholme. There is also Skyline service 199 operating by High Peak Buses half-hourly (hourly in evenings and on Sundays) to Buxton via Stockport, Disley and Chapel-en-le-Frith, as well as a number of Metroline Manchester and Diamond North West services to various parts of Manchester. A network of FlixBus and National Express coach services serve Manchester Airport and operate to destinations further afield.

=== Roads ===
The airport is a 20-minute drive from Manchester city centre and is reached by the M56 motorway, with a dedicated approach road from the motorway at junction 5. The M56 is the main route used by traffic to reach the airport. There are also minor local roads serving the airport from the north (Wythenshawe) and the east (Heald Green). The M56/A538 road junction serves the World Freight Terminal, to the west of the airport. The A538 runs east–west serving the local towns of Altrincham and Wilmslow. Taxi ranks are situated by arrivals at all three terminals.

Proposed as part of the SEMMMS (South East Manchester Multi-Modal Strategy) Relief Road Scheme, the A555 was extended to the airport from the A6 south of Stockport. Planning permission had been granted, with inquiries for Compulsory Purchase and Side Roads Orders following up in September 2014. After significant delays, the new link road opened on 15 October 2018.

=== Parking ===
The airport's official short-stay car parking can be found in the multistorey car parks adjacent to Terminals 1, 2 and 3. In addition there are a number of long stay and valet parking options.

=== Drop off zones ===
Until 2018, cars dropping off passengers could do so outside terminals for free. On 10 July 2018, Manchester Airport took the step of introducing a fee of £3-to-£4 for vehicles dropping off passengers at terminals. Alternatively, passengers being dropped off can be taken to an off-site car park from where a shuttle bus operates to the terminals. The airport issues fines of up to £100 to vehicles which breach its terms and conditions for the drop off zones. The changes have been seen as unwelcome and nonconstructive by passengers and taxi drivers, with some saying they will boycott the airport.

== Effect on the area ==
Between 1997 and 1999 three protest camps were set up to oppose the building of the second runway, the felling of nearby trees on land owned by the National Trust in Styal, Cheshire, and air transportation in general. Camps were set up in Flywood, Arthur's Wood and Cedar's Wood. Swampy, a well-known activist, was among many protesters.

The south-west end of the new runway is closer to the town of Knutsford and to the village of Mobberley. There was initially an increase in noise experienced by local residents from the aircraft being lower and closer. All residents that were able to prove that their property had lost value, as a result of the operation of Runway 2, were compensated in 2010. Manchester Airports Group made a further, voluntary payment in 2012, to compensate those who felt aggrieved but had been unable to prove financial harm as a result of the operation of Runway 2. The precepts for Knutsford Town Council and Mobberley Parish Council residents were paid and money invested in local schools.

Manchester Airport applied in 2007 to build on land in Styal in order to increase its car parking. However, the then Macclesfield Borough Council refused to give it planning permission to do so and expressed annoyance at the airport for not investing enough in public transport.

== Accidents and incidents ==
- On 27 March 1951, a Douglas C-47A-75-DL Dakota 3 cargo aircraft operated by Air Transport Charter and en route to Nutts Corner in County Antrim, Northern Ireland, crashed at Heyhead shortly after take-off from runway 06, following the aircraft's failure to gain height. There were four fatalities – two of the three crew on board and two of the three passengers. The subsequent investigation found that the crash resulted from a loss of engine power, caused by ice forming in the carburettor intakes, attributable to the captain's failure to use the heat controls. An extended undercarriage and snow on the wings may have also been contributory factors.
- On 20 March 1969, Vickers Viscount G-AVJA of British Midland International crashed on take-off. Three of the four people on board were killed.
- On 22 August 1985, British Airtours Flight 28M - a charter flight operated by British Airtours suffered an engine failure during take-off from runway 24, resulted in a massive fire spreading into the cabin, causing 55 fatalities (mostly from smoke inhalation) of 137 people onboard. The uncontained engine failure of the Boeing 737–236 Advanced involved was later traced to an incorrectly repaired combustor causing the turbine disc to shatter and puncture the wing fuel tanks. As a result, fire resistance and evacuation procedures were improved.

== Runway visitor park ==
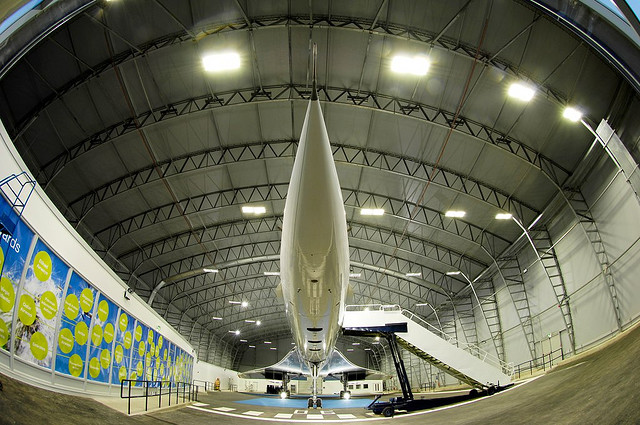
Concorde BOAC in its hangar at the Aviation Viewing Park

Manchester Airport has had public viewing areas since the airport opened to the public in 1938. The 1960/1970s pier-top viewing facilities have been closed because of security concerns. In May 1992, an official "Aviation Viewing Park" (AVP) was created just off the A538 road on the south-western side of the airfield. This was moved to the western side of the airfield in May 1997 to allow construction of the second runway. Renamed the "Runway Visitor Park" in June 2010, the facility is regarded as providing the best official viewing facilities for aircraft spotting at any major UK airport by aircraft enthusiasts. Visitors can view aircraft taking off and landing from both runways and aircraft taxiing to and from the runways. This attraction now draws around 300,000 visitors a year and is one of Greater Manchester's top 10 attractions.

The Runway Visitor Park is also home to a small number of retired aircraft exhibits. These currently are:

- Avro RJX100 Prototype (Registration: G-IRJX). This was the last British-built jetliner. It was delivered in 2001 from the nearby, but now-demolished Woodford Aerodrome. It was the first exhibit to be added to the park.
- British Airways Concorde (Registration: G-BOAC 'Alpha Charlie'). Was acquired shortly after the retirement of the British Airways Concorde fleet in 2003. It has since been enclosed in a purpose-built hangar with a conference centre hosting regular events. This particular aircraft was the flagship of the British Airways fleet due to its G-BOAC designation, a reference to BOAC – a forerunner airline to British Airways.
- Front Fuselage of Monarch Airlines DC-10-30 (Registration: G-DMCA). This was the only DC-10 operated by now-defunct Monarch Airlines, operating between 1996 and 2001. The original complete airframe was held at Manchester for a short while after being retired and subsequently scrapped, the front section being moved to the park in 2003. It is the only remains of a DC-10 in the UK.
- BEA Trident 3 (Registration: G-AWZK). This aircraft last flew in 1985 and had been used for tug and de-ice training at Heathrow Airport. It was moved to the park in 2004, and opened to visitors in 2007. It is both the oldest and longest retired of all the exhibits.
- RAF Nimrod MR2 (Registration: XV231). First deployed in the 1970s and retired in the late 2000s. This aircraft was used in specialist search and rescue missions. It had been deployed in the wars in Iraq and Afghanistan. It was flown into Manchester and put on display in 2010. It is the only military exhibit.

== Bibliography ==
- Brown, Peter C. (15 February 2017). Manchester Airport Through Time. Amberley Publishing Limited. ISBN 978-1-4456-6391-3.
- Scholefield, R. A.; MacDonald, Steve (1978). First and foremost: 50 years of Manchester's civic airports. Manchester: Manchester International Airport Authority.
- Scholefield, R. A. (1998). Manchester Airport. Stroud: Sutton. ISBN 0-7509-1954-X.
