= SRO =

SRO may refer to:

- Saudi Railways Organization (SRO)
- School resource officer, a police officer assigned to a school
- Self-regulatory organization
- Senior reactor operator, a supervisory position overseeing the work of the nuclear reactor operators
- Senior responsible owner, a role in project management
- Side roads order, UK order relating to roads
- Single-room occupancy, small rooms rented as affordable housing
- Slovenský rozhlas ("SRo"), Slovak radio group
- S.R.O. (album), by Herb Alpert and the Tijuana Brass, 1966
- S.R.O. (radio program), a Philippine radio program
- SRO Cinemaserye, Philippine 2009 TV drama
- Standing-room only, an event in which all seats are occupied leaving only places to stand
- SRO Motorsports Group (formerly Stéphane Ratel Organisation), a motorsports organization
- Strontium oxide (SrO), an inorganic compound
- "S.R.O.", a song from the 1998 Avail album Over the James
- s.r.o (Společnost s ručením omezeným) after the names of Czech and Slovak businesses indicates limited liability
- Standard Roman Orthography, Cree language
