= Side roads order =

UK statutory order

A side roads order (SRO) is a statutory order in the UK which authorises a highway authority to make alterations to roads or other highways affected by a trunk road scheme – e.g. stopping up, diverting or connecting them to new trunk road and stopping up and replacing private accesses affected). It is defined by section 14 of the Highways Act 1980.
