= List of airports in Greece =

Map

This is a list of airports in Greece, grouped by type and sorted by location.

Greece, officially the Hellenic Republic, is a country in southeastern Europe, situated on the southern end of the Balkan Peninsula. It has land borders with Albania, North Macedonia and Bulgaria to the north, and Turkey to the east. The Aegean Sea lies to the east of mainland Greece, the Ionian Sea to the west and the Mediterranean Sea to the south.

Greece is divided into 13 regions (the official regional administrative divisions), including nine on the mainland and four island groups. The regions are further subdivided into 74 regional units. The country has many islands (approximately 1,400, of which 227 are inhabited), including Crete, the Dodecanese, the Cyclades and the Ionian Islands among others.

== Airports ==
ICAO location identifiers link to airport's page at Hellenic Civil Aviation Authority.

City served / Location	Region	ICAO	IATA	Airport name	Coordinates
International airports					
Alexandroupoli	East Macedonia and Thrace	LGAL	AXD	Alexandroupolis International Airport "Democritus"	40.855869°N 25.956264°E
Athens	Attica	LGAV	ATH	Athens International Airport "Eleftherios Venizelos"	37.936389°N 23.947222°E
Chania	Crete	LGSA	CHQ	Chania International Airport "Ioannis Daskalogiannis"	35.531667°N 24.149722°E
Corfu (Kerkira)	Ionian Islands	LGKR	CFU	Corfu Island International Airport "Ioannis Kapodistrias"	39.601944°N 19.911667°E
Heraklion	Crete	LGIR	HER	Heraklion International Airport "Nikos Kazantzakis"	35.339722°N 25.180278°E
Kalamata	Peloponnese	LGKL	KLX	Kalamata International Airport "Captain Vassilis Constantakopoulos"	37.068333°N 22.025556°E
Kavala	East Macedonia and Thrace	LGKV	KVA	Kavala International Airport "Alexander the Great"	40.913333°N 24.619167°E
Kefalonia	Ionian Islands	LGKF	EFL	Kefalonia Island International Airport "Anna Pollatou"	38.12°N 20.500278°E
Kos	Dodecanese	LGKO	KGS	Kos Island International Airport "Hippocrates"	36.793336°N 27.091667°E
Lemnos	North Aegean	LGLM	LXS	Lemnos Island International Airport "Hephaestus"	39.917072°N 25.236308°E
Lesbos	North Aegean	LGMT	MJT	Mytilene Island International Airport "Odysseas Elitis"	39.0567°N 26.5994°E
Rhodes	Dodecanese	LGRP	RHO	Rhodes Island International Airport "Diagoras"	36.405419°N 28.086192°E
Samos	North Aegean	LGSM	SMI	Samos Island International Airport "Aristarchus of Samos"	37.6891°N 26.9116°E
Skiathos	Thessaly	LGSK	JSI	Skiathos Island International Airport "Alexandros Papadiamantis"	39.1775°N 23.503675°E
Thessaloniki	Central Macedonia	LGTS	SKG	Thessaloniki International Airport "Macedonia"	40.519722°N 22.970833°E
Zakynthos	Ionian Islands	LGZA	ZTH	Zakynthos Island International Airport "Dionisios Solomos"	37.750833°N 20.884167°E
National airports					
Astypalaia	South Aegean	LGPL	JTY	Astypalaia Island National Airport "Panaghia"	36.5793°N 26.3756°E
Chios	North Aegean	LGHI	JKH	Chios Island National Airport "Homer"	38.343056°N 26.140556°E
Ikaria	North Aegean	LGIK	JIK	Ikaria Island National Airport "Icarus"	37.682717°N 26.347061°E
Ioannina	Epirus	LGIO	IOA	Ioannina National Airport "King Pyrrhus"	39.696389°N 20.8225°E
Kalymnos	South Aegean	LGKY	JKL	Kalymnos Island National Airport "Pothaea"	36.963333°N 26.940556°E
Karpathos	South Aegean	LGKP	AOK	Karpathos Island National Airport "Ammopi"	35.420556°N 27.146667°E
Kastoria	West Macedonia	LGKA	KSO	Kastoria National Airport "Aristotle"	40.4471°N 21.2794°E
Kozani	West Macedonia	LGKZ	KZI	Kozani National Airport "Philip"	40.286111°N 21.840833°E
Kithira	Attica	LGKC	KIT	Kithira Island National Airport "Alexandros Aristotelous Onassis"	36.274258°N 23.016978°E
Milos	South Aegean	LGML	MLO	Milos Island National Airport "Aphrodite"	36.6969°N 24.4769°E
Mykonos	South Aegean	LGMK	JMK	Mykonos Island National Airport "Dilos"	37.435128°N 25.348103°E
Naxos	South Aegean	LGNX	JNX	Naxos Island National Airport "Apollon"	37.081072°N 25.368158°E
Paros	South Aegean	LGPA	PAS	Paros Island National Airport "Panteleou Paros Airport"	37.020833°N 25.113056°E
Patras	West Greece	LGRX	GPA	Araxos National Airport "Agamemnon"	38.151111°N 21.425556°E
Preveza	Epirus	LGPZ	PVK	Preveza National Airport	38.925556°N 20.765278°E
Santorini	South Aegean	LGSR	JTR	Santorini (Thira) National Airport "Zefiros"	36.399169°N 25.479333°E
Skyros	Central Greece	LGSY	SKU	Skyros Island National Airport "Aegean"	38.9675°N 24.487222°E
Syros	South Aegean	LGSO	JSY	Syros Island National Airport "Demetrius Vikelas"	37.4229°N 24.9498°E
Volos	Thessaly	LGBL	VOL	Nea Anchialos National Airport (Volos Central Greece Airport)	39.219444°N 22.794167°E
Other public use airports					
Kasos (Kassos)	South Aegean	LGKS	KSJ	Kassos Island Public Airport "Agia Marina"	35.421358°N 26.910047°E
Kastelorizo (Megisti)	South Aegean	LGKJ	KZS	Kastelorizo Island Public Airport "Megisti"	36.14167°N 29.576376°E
Karditsa	Thessaly	---	---	Karditsa Myrina Airfield "Mirina"	39.4073°N 21.9956°E
Leros	South Aegean	LGLE	LRS	Leros Island Public Airport "Dodekanisos"	37.184722°N 26.800278°E
Megara	Attica	LGMG	---	Megara General Aviation Airport	37.9812°N 23.3659°E
Messolonghi	Aetolia-Acarnania	---	---	Messologi Airfield	38.3568°N 21.4802°E
Sitia	Crete	LGST	JSH	Sitia Public Airport "Vitsentzos Kornaros"	35.216108°N 26.101325°E
Military airports					
Agrinio	West Greece	LGAG	AGQ	Agrinio Airport (now military)	38.6020°N 21.3499°E
Alexandreia	Central Macedonia	LGAX	---	Alexandria Airport	40.6511°N 22.4885°E
Amigdaleon, Kavala	Central Macedonia	LGKM	---	Amigdaleon Airport	40.9732°N 24.3411°E
Andravida	West Greece	LGAD	PYR	Andravida Airport	37.9198°N 21.2922°E
Elefsina	Attica	LGEL	---	Elefsina Airport	38.0646°N 23.5556°E
Larissa	Thessaly	LGLR	LRA	Larissa National Airport "Thessaly" (public until 1997, now military)	39.6501°N 22.4628°E
Marathon (Marathonas)	Attica	LGKN	---	Kotroni Airport	38.1374°N 23.9518°E
Maritsa, Rhodes	South Aegean	LGRD	---	Rhodes Maritsa Airport (public until 1977, now military)	36.3844°N 28.1177°E
Tanagra	Central Greece	LGTG	---	Tanagra Air Base	38.3396°N 23.5651°E
Tatoi, Decelea	Attica	LGTT	---	Tatoi Airport	38.1085°N 23.7835°E
Tripoli	Peloponnese	LGTP	---	Tripoli Airport	37.5306°N 22.4035°E
Closed airports					
Athens, Hellinikon	Attica	~~LGAT~~	~~ATH~~	Ellinikon International Airport (closed in 2001)	
Epitalio, Greece	West Greece	~~LGEP~~	---	Epitalio Airport	
Kalamata	Peloponnese	---	---	Triodos Airport (closed in 1970)	
Paros	Cyclades	~~PAS~~	~~LGPA~~	Old Paros National Airport (closed in 2016)	
Porto Cheli	Peloponnese	~~LGHL~~	~~PKH~~	Porto Cheli Airport (privately owned, closed in 2008)	
Sedes, Thessaloniki	Central Macedonia	~~LGSD~~	---	Sedes Air Base	
Sparti	Peloponnese	~~LGSP~~	~~SPJ~~	Sparti Airport	
Stefanovikio	Thessaly	~~LGSV~~	---	Stefanovikio Airport	
Planned airports					
Kastelli, Heraklion	Crete	LGTL	HER	Heraklion-Kastelli International Airport (opening in 2027)	35.1907°N 25.3264°E

== See also ==
- List of airports by ICAO code: L#LG – Greece
- List of the busiest airports in Greece
- Transport in Greece
- Wikipedia:WikiProject Aviation/Airline destination lists: Europe#Greece
