= List of the busiest airports in Greece =

This is a list of Greece's busiest airports per year by passenger traffic.

== 2025 ==
Data taken from the official websites of the airports

| Rank | Airport | Total passengers | Annual change | Rank change |
|---|---|---|---|---|
| 1 | Athens | 33,993,746 | ▲6.7% | Steady |
| 2 | Heraklion | 10,033,151 | ▲6.9% | Steady |
| 3 | Thessaloniki | 7,982,798 | ▲8.2% | Steady |
| 4 | Rhodes | 7,093,264 | ▲2.5% | Steady |
| 5 | Corfu | 4,591,238 | ▲5.7% | Steady |
| 6 | Chania | 4,150,829 | ▲5.0% | Steady |
| 7 | Kos | 3,176,063 | ▲3.5% | Steady |
| 8 | Santorini | 2,418,219 | ▼16.0% | Steady |
| 9 | Zakynthos | 2,282,774 | ▲2.7% | Steady |
| 10 | Mykonos | 1,581,742 | ▼2.0% | Steady |

== 2024 ==
Data taken from the official websites of the airports

| Rank | Airport | Total passengers | Annual change | Rank change |
|---|---|---|---|---|
| 1 | Athens | 31,854,761 | ▲13.1% | Steady |
| 2 | Heraklion | 9,376,958 | ▲7.5% | Steady |
| 3 | Thessaloniki | 7,381,064 | ▲5.0% | Steady |
| 4 | Rhodes | 6,921,748 | ▲12.7% | Steady |
| 5 | Corfu | 4,343,748 | ▲6.8% | Steady |
| 6 | Chania | 3,952,126 | ▲8.3% | Steady |
| 7 | Kos | 3,069,659 | ▲3.9% | Steady |
| 8 | Santorini | 2,877,122 | ▲3.7% | Steady |
| 9 | Zakynthos | 2,223,011 | ▲6.8% | Steady |
| 10 | Mykonos | 1,613,638 | ▼2.7% | Steady |

== 2023 ==
Data taken from the official websites of the airports

| Rank | Airport | Total passengers | Annual change | Rank change |
|---|---|---|---|---|
| 1 | Athens | 28,174,150 | ▲24.0% | Steady |
| 2 | Heraklion | 8,723,031 | ▲7.7% | Steady |
| 3 | Thessaloniki | 7,029,957 | ▲18.7% | Steady |
| 4 | Rhodes | 6,142,813 | ▲4.9% | Steady |
| 5 | Corfu | 4,068,053 | ▲8.5% | Steady |
| 6 | Chania | 3,648,416 | ▲10.9% | Steady |
| 7 | Kos | 2,954,719 | ▲5.8% | Steady |
| 8 | Santorini | 2,775,805 | ▲1.1% | Steady |
| 9 | Zakynthos | 2,081,931 | ▲9.4% | Steady |
| 10 | Mykonos | 1,659,187 | ▼1.7% | Steady |

== 2022 ==
Data taken from the official websites of the airports

| Rank | Airport | Total passengers | Annual change | Rank change |
|---|---|---|---|---|
| 1 | Athens | 22,728,750 | ▲84.1% | Steady |
| 2 | Heraklion | 8,087,146 | ▲60.2% | Steady |
| 3 | Thessaloniki | 5,923,175 | ▲71.7% | Steady |
| 4 | Rhodes | 5,857,036 | ▲74.0% | Steady |
| 5 | Corfu | 3,749,106 | ▲83.4% | Steady |
| 6 | Chania | 3,290,802 | ▲83.3% | Steady |
| 7 | Kos | 2,791,590 | ▲77.3% | Steady |
| 8 | Santorini | 2,744,650 | ▲77.5% | Steady |
| 9 | Zakynthos | 1.903,404 | ▲87.9% | Steady |
| 10 | Mykonos | 1,688,037 | ▲60.4% | Steady |

== 2021 ==
Data taken from the official websites of the airports

| Rank | Airport | Total passengers | Annual change | Rank change |
|---|---|---|---|---|
| 1 | Athens | 12,345,786 | ▲52.8% | Steady |
| 2 | Heraklion | 5,046,236 | ▲112.2% | Steady |
| 3 | Thessaloniki | 3,449,658 | ▲48.9% | Steady |
| 4 | Rhodes | 3,366,614 | ▲117.0% | Steady |
| 5 | Corfu | 2,044,704 | ▲112.8% | Steady |
| 6 | Chania | 1,795,236 | ▲155.2% | ▲1 |
| 7 | Kos | 1,574,518 | ▲101.9% | ▼1 |
| 8 | Santorini | 1,546,584 | ▲170.0% | Steady |
| 9 | Zakynthos | 1,012,913 | ▲135.4% | Steady |
| 10 | Mykonos | 1,052,080 | ▲157.2% | Steady |

== 2020 ==
Data taken from Hellenic Civil Aviation Authority (CAA)

| Rank | Airport | Total passengers | Annual change | Rank change |
|---|---|---|---|---|
| 1 | Athens | 8,026,940 | ▼68.6% | Steady |
| 2 | Heraklion | 2,398,264 | ▼69.8% | Steady |
| 3 | Thessaloniki | 2,302,616 | ▼66.6% | Steady |
| 4 | Rhodes | 1,521,327 | ▼72.6% | Steady |
| 5 | Corfu | 949.853 | ▼71.0% | Steady |
| 6 | Kos | 779,770 | ▼70.9% | ▲1 |
| 7 | Chania | 696,548 | ▼76.7% | ▼1 |
| 8 | Santorini | 563.383 | ▼75.5% | Steady |
| 9 | Zakynthos | 421,565 | ▼76.7% | Steady |
| 10 | Mykonos | 396,066 | ▼73.9% | Steady |
| 11 | Mytilene | 200,014 | ▼59.7% | ▲2 |
| 12 | Cephalonia | 184,489 | ▼76.2% | ▼1 |
| 13 | Aktion / Preveza | 154,325 | ▼75.3% | ▼1 |
| 14 | Samos | 136,442 | ▼70.8% | Steady |
| 15 | Alexandroupolis | 128,949 | ▼45.8% | ▲5 |
| 16 | Chios | 122,742 | ▼49.5% | ▲3 |
| 17 | Paros | 98,991 | ▼56.2% | ▲4 |
| 18 | Kalamata | 87,283 | ▼73.7% | ▼2 |
| 19 | Skiathos | 85,729 | ▼80.8% | ▼4 |
| 20 | Kavala | 70,665 | ▼78.1% | ▼3 |
| 21 | Lemnos | 56,906 | | |
| 22 | Naxos | 52,594 | | |
| 23 | Karpathos | 51,315 | | |
| 24 | Ioannina | 36.856 | | |
| 25 | Milos | 36,534 | | |
| 26 | Araxos/Patras | 28,348 | | |
| 27 | Ikaria | 23,763 | | |
| 28 | Kithira | 13,618 | | |
| 29 | Leros | 11,994 | | |
| 30 | Sitia | 11,134 | | |
| 31 | Nea Anchialos / Volos | 10,372 | | |
| 32 | Astypalaia | 9,811 | | |
| 33 | Skyros | 8,768 | | |
| 34 | Syros | 7,395 | | |
| 35 | Kalymnos | 5,556 | | |
| 36 | Kastellorizo | 2,696 | | |
| 37 | Kastoria | 1,588 | | |
| 38 | Kozani | 1,561 | | |
| 39 | Kasos | 1,110 | | |

== 2019 ==
Data taken from Hellenic Civil Aviation Authority (CAA) and from the official websites of the airports

| Rank | Airport | Total passengers | Annual change | Rank change |
|---|---|---|---|---|
| 1 | Athens | 25,574,030 | ▲6.0% | Steady |
| 2 | Heraklion | 7,933,558 | ▼2.0% | Steady |
| 3 | Thessaloniki | 6,897,057 | ▲3.1% | Steady |
| 4 | Rhodes | 5,542,567 | ▼0.5% | Steady |
| 5 | Corfu | 3,275,897 | ▼2.6% | Steady |
| 6 | Chania | 2,983,542 | ▼0.8% | Steady |
| 7 | Kos | 2,676,644 | ▲0.4% | Steady |
| 8 | Santorini | 2,300,408 | ▲2.0% | Steady |
| 9 | Zakynthos | 1,810,427 | ▲0.5% | Steady |
| 10 | Mykonos | 1,520,145 | ▲8.9% | Steady |
| 11 | Cephalonia | 774,170 | ▲1.6% | Steady |
| 12 | Aktion / Preveza | 625,790 | ▲7.2% | Steady |
| 13 | Mytilene | 496,577 | ▲4.1% | Steady |
| 14 | Samos | 467,395 | ▲3.9% | Steady |
| 15 | Skiathos | 446,219 | ▲1.9% | Steady |
| 16 | Kalamata | 331,961 | ▲15.2% | ▲1 |
| 17 | Kavala | 323,310 | ▼20.6% | ▼1 |
| 18 | Karpathos | 259,517 | ▲2.2% | ▲2 |
| 19 | Chios | 242,815 | ▲5.0% | ▼1 |
| 20 | Alexandroupolis | 237,939 | ▲13.1% | ▼1 |
| 21 | Paros | 226,124 | ▲10.5% | Steady |
| 22 | Araxos/Patras | 165,424 | ▼9.0% | Steady |
| 23 | Ioannina | 133,568 | ▲22.6% | Steady |

== 2018 ==
Data taken from Hellenic Civil Aviation Authority (CAA) and from the official websites of the airports

| Rank | Airport | Total passengers | Annual change | Rank change |
|---|---|---|---|---|
| 1 | Athens | 24,135,736 | ▲11.0% | Steady |
| 2 | Heraklion | 8,098,465 | ▲10.4% | Steady |
| 3 | Thessaloniki | 6,689,193 | ▲7.1% | Steady |
| 4 | Rhodes | 5,567,748 | ▲5.0% | Steady |
| 5 | Corfu | 3,364,115 | ▲15.1% | ▲1 |
| 6 | Chania | 3,008,687 | ▼1.1% | ▼1 |
| 7 | Kos | 2,666,307 | ▲14.9% | Steady |
| 8 | Santorini | 2,254,926 | ▲16.8% | Steady |
| 9 | Zakynthos | 1,800,457 | ▲8.5% | Steady |
| 10 | Mykonos | 1,395,787 | ▲15.6% | Steady |
| 11 | Cephalonia | 761,647 | ▲21% | Steady |
| 12 | Aktion / Preveza | 583,666 | ▲2.6% | Steady |
| 13 | Mytilene | 465,057 | ▲6.6% | Steady |
| 14 | Samos | 462,749 | ▲12.8% | ▲1 |
| 15 | Skiathos | 437,916 | ▲3.3% | ▼1 |
| 16 | Kavala | 406,949 | ▲20.4% | Steady |
| 17 | Kalamata | 278,961 | ▲0.9% | Steady |
| 18 | Karpathos | 253,987 | ▲10.4% | Steady |
| 19 | Chios | 231,340 | ▲5.7% | Steady |
| 20 | Alexandroupolis | 210,383 | ▲24.6% | Steady |
| 21 | Paros | 204,924 | ▲25.3% | Steady |
| 22 | Araxos/Patras | 180,129 | ▲17.9% | Steady |
| 23 | Ioannina | 109,830 | ▲14.9% | Steady |
| 24 | Lemnos | 94,227 | ▲8.7% | Steady |
| 25 | Naxos | 86,210 | ▲52.2% | Steady |
| 26 | Milos | 77,501 | ▲66.4% | Steady |
| 27 | Sitia | 61,877 | ▲93.3% | ▲2 |
| 28 | Ikaria | 44,203 | ▲6.4% | ▼1 |
| 29 | Nea Anchialos / Volos | 41,357 | ▲35.3% | ▲1 |
| 30 | Kithira | 37,031 | ▲18.3% | ▼1 |
| 31 | Leros | 24,048 | ▼12.8% | Steady |
| 32 | Skyros | 18,103 | ▼15.0% | Steady |
| 33 | Syros | 18,047 | ▲3.8% | Steady |
| 34 | Astypalaia | 14,029 | ▲15.2% | Steady |
| 35 | Kalymnos | 10,234 | ▼14.5% | Steady |
| 36 | Kastellorizo | 5,485 | ▼0.2% | Steady |
| 37 | Kozani | 4,310 | ▲13.0% | ▲1 |
| 38 | Kastoria | 4,279 | ▼15.9% | ▼1 |
| 39 | Kasos | 2,840 | ▼7.0% | Steady |
| Total | | ▲63,728,596 | ▲10.1% | |

== 2017 ==
Data taken from Hellenic Civil Aviation Authority (CAA) and from the official websites of the airports

| Rank | Airport | Total passengers | Annual change | Rank change |
|---|---|---|---|---|
| 1 | Athens | 21,737,787 | ▲8.6% | Steady |
| 2 | Heraklion | 7,480,408 | ▲9.0% | Steady |
| 3 | Thessaloniki | 6,395,523 | ▲11.5% | Steady |
| 4 | Rhodes | 5,301,517 | ▲6.6% | Steady |
| 5 | Chania | 3,042,903 | ▲2.6% | Steady |
| 6 | Corfu | 2,918,434 | ▲5.1% | Steady |
| 7 | Kos | 2,320,590 | ▲20.7% | Steady |
| 8 | Santorini | 1,928,295 | ▲13.0% | Steady |
| 9 | Zakynthos | 1,659,646 | ▲16.9% | Steady |
| 10 | Mykonos | 1,207,061 | ▲18.6% | Steady |
| 11 | Cephalonia | 629,671 | ▲15.1% | Steady |
| 12 | Aktion / Preveza | 569,241 | ▲17.9% | Steady |
| 13 | Mytilene | 436,105 | ▲3.8% | Steady |
| 14 | Skiathos | 425,287 | ▲5.2% | Steady |
| 15 | Samos | 410,331 | ▲12.9% | Steady |
| 16 | Kavala | 337,963 | ▲22.8% | Steady |
| 17 | Kalamata | 278,063 | ▲20.8% | Steady |
| 18 | Karpathos | 223,847 | ▲1.3% | Steady |
| 19 | Chios | 216,903 | ▲12.1% | Steady |
| 20 | Alexandroupolis | 169,806 | ▲5,1% | Steady |
| 21 | Paros | 163,368 | ▲119.9% | ▲3 |
| 22 | Araxos/Patras | 153,496 | ▲18.3% | ▼1 |
| 23 | Ioannina | 96,350 | ▼0.8% | ▼1 |
| 24 | Lemnos | 86,153 | ▼2.6% | ▼1 |
| 25 | Naxos | 56,430 | ▲59.9% | ▲2 |
| 26 | Milos | 45,209 | ▼0.1% | ▼1 |
| 27 | Ikaria | 41,553 | ▲0.8% | ▼1 |
| 28 | Kithira | 31,905 | ▲0.1% | Steady |
| 29 | Sitia | 31,856 | ▲52.4% | ▲3 |
| 30 | Nea Anchialos / Volos | 30,565 | ▲38.0% | ▲1 |
| 31 | Leros | 27,583 | ▲8.0% | ▼1 |
| 32 | Syros | 21,252 | ▲18.9% | ▲2 |
| 33 | Skyros | 17,092 | ▼41.9% | ▼4 |
| 34 | Astypalaia | 12,252 | ▲0.6% | ▲1 |
| 35 | Kalymnos | 11,985 | ▼35.6% | ▼2 |
| 36 | Kastellorizo | 5,494 | ▼21.0% | Steady |
| 37 | Kastoria | 5,091 | ▼19.4% | Steady |
| 38 | Kozani | 3,815 | ▼11.0% | Steady |
| 39 | Kasos | 3,066 | ▼21.1% | Steady |
| Total | | 58,533,896 | ▲9.0% | |

== 2016 ==
| Rank | Airport | Total passengers | Annual change | Rank change |
|---|---|---|---|---|
| 1 | Athens | 20,017,530 | ▲10,7% | Steady |
| 2 | Heraklion | 6,865,681 | ▲13,3% | Steady |
| 3 | Thessaloniki | 5,687,325 | ▲13,2% | Steady |
| 4 | Rhodes | 5,007,159 | ▲9,3% | Steady |
| 5 | Chania | 2,953,278 | ▲10,0% | Steady |
| 6 | Corfu | 2,788,923 | ▲14,4% | Steady |
| 7 | Kos | 1,930,235 | ▼10,0% | Steady |
| 8 | Santorini | 1,687,841 | ▲12,8% | Steady |
| 9 | Zakynthos | 1,423,044 | ▲12,2% | Steady |
| 10 | Mykonos | 999,026 | ▲14,1% | Steady |
| 11 | Cephalonia | 542,359 | ▲10,1% | Steady |
| 12 | Aktion / Preveza | 476,333 | ▲22,7% | ▲2 |
| 13 | Mytilene | 408,572 | ▼15,1% | ▼1 |
| 14 | Skiathos | 397,646 | ▲12,6% | ▲1 |
| 15 | Samos | 349,539 | ▼13,3% | ▼2 |
| 16 | Kavala | 260,740 | ▲7,0% | Steady |
| 17 | Kalamata | 230,100 | ▲22,3% | ▲2 |
| 18 | Karpathos | 220,930 | ▼0,8% | ▼1 |
| 19 | Chios | 193,427 | ▼0,9% | ▼1 |
| 20 | Alexandroupolis | 161,636 | ▼4,1% | Steady |
| 21 | Araxos/Patras | 129,738 | ▼12,1% | Steady |
| 22 | Ioannina | 97,745 | ▲13,0% | ▲1 |
| 23 | Lemnos | 88,416 | ▼11,4% | ▼1 |
| 24 | Paros | 74,344 | ▲72,2% | ▲2 |
| 25 | Milos | 45,268 | ▼10,1% | ▼1 |
| 26 | Ikaria | 41,238 | ▼3,9% | ▲1 |
| 27 | Naxos | 35,300 | ▼19,7% | ▼2 |
| 28 | Kithira | 31,880 | ▼15,8% | Steady |
| 29 | Skyros | 29,397 | ▲36,1% | ▲4 |
| 30 | Leros | 25,551 | ▼11,6% | ▼1 |
| 31 | Nea Anchialos / Volos | 22,145 | ▼10,3% | Steady |
| 32 | Sitia | 20,904 | ▼22,6% | ▼2 |
| 33 | Kalymnos | 18,621 | ▼24,2% | ▼1 |
| 34 | Syros | 17,878 | ▲21,8% | Steady |
| 35 | Astypalaia | 12,020 | ▼14,7% | Steady |
| 36 | Kastellorizo | 6,958 | ▼13,2% | Steady |
| 37 | Kastoria | 6,317 | ▲27,1% | Steady |
| 38 | Kozani | 4,287 | ▲32,2% | ▲1 |
| 39 | Kasos | 3,888 | ▼12,7% | ▼1 |
| Total | | 53,703,933 | ▲1,09% | |

== 2015 ==
| Rank | Airport | Total passengers | Annual change | Rank change |
|---|---|---|---|---|
| 1 | Athens | 18,086,894 | ▲19.0% | Steady |
| 2 | Heraklion | 6,057,355 | ▲0.5% | Steady |
| 3 | Thessaloniki | 5,341,293 | ▲7.9% | Steady |
| 4 | Rhodes | 4,579,023 | ▲0.6% | Steady |
| 5 | Chania | 2,702,283 | ▲10.4% | Steady |
| 6 | Corfu | 2,438,016 | ▲2.3% | Steady |
| 7 | Kos | 2,143,860 | ▼3.2% | Steady |
| 8 | Santorini | 1,495,890 | ▲26.8% | ▲1 |
| 9 | Zakynthos | 1,268,497 | ▲6.8% | ▼1 |
| 10 | Mykonos | 876,057 | ▲12.5% | Steady |
| 11 | Cephalonia | 492,502 | ▲2.7% | Steady |
| 12 | Mytilene | 481,422 | ▲4.6% | Steady |
| 13 | Samos | 403,150 | ▲1.7% | Steady |
| 14 | Aktion / Preveza | 388,295 | ▲8.4% | Steady |
| 15 | Skiathos | 353,083 | ▲11.9% | Steady |
| 16 | Kavala | 243,745 | ▲9.3% | ▲1 |
| 17 | Karpathos | 222,805 | ▲9.5% | ▲1 |
| 18 | Chios | 195,183 | ▲5.5% | ▲1 |
| 19 | Kalamata | 188,209 | ▼20.4% | ▼3 |
| 20 | Alexandroupolis | 168,631 | ▲6.2% | Steady |
| 21 | Araxos/Patras | 147,560 | ▲0.8% | Steady |
| 22 | Lemnos | 99,491 | ▲7.0% | Steady |
| 23 | Ioannina | 86,523 | ▲9.0% | Steady |
| 24 | Milos | 50,589 | ▲28.9% | ▲3 |
| 25 | Paros | 43,182 | ▲8.3% | Steady |

== 2014 ==
| Rank | Airport | Total passengers | Annual change | Rank change |
|---|---|---|---|---|
| 1 | Athens | 15,134,529 | ▲21.5% | Steady |
| 2 | Heraklion | 6,024,958 | ▲4.3% | Steady |
| 3 | Thessaloniki | 4,950,726 | ▲22.6% | ▲1 |
| 4 | Rhodes | 4,552,056 | ▲8.4% | ▼1 |
| 5 | Chania | 2,458,130 | ▲18.2% | ▲1 |
| 6 | Corfu | 2,383.353 | ▲13.1% | ▼1 |
| 7 | Kos | 2,213,356 | ▲9.1% | Steady |
| 8 | Zakynthos | 1,188,112 | ▲18.2% | Steady |
| 9 | Santorini | 1,179,653 | ▲31.3 | Steady |
| 10 | Mykonos | 778,619 | ▲33.2% | Steady |
| 11 | Cephalonia | 479,422 | ▲11.4% | Steady |
| 12 | Mytilene | 459,923 | ▲14.7% | Steady |
| 13 | Samos | 396,306 | ▲15.3% | Steady |
| 14 | Aktion / Preveza | 358,238 | ▲13.2% | Steady |
| 15 | Skiathos | 315,397 | ▲18.6% | Steady |
| 16 | Kalamata | 236,202 | ▲72.4% | ▲4 |
| 17 | Kavala | 223,057 | ▲6.5% | ▼1 |
| 18 | Karpathos | 204.621 | ▲21.6 | ▲1 |
| 19 | Chios | 185,082 | ▲6.6% | ▼2 |
| 20 | Alexandroupolis | 158,737 | ▼5.9% | ▼2 |
| 21 | Araxos | 146,403 | ▲4.8% | ▼1 |
| 22 | Lemnos | 92,964 | ▲14.4% | Steady |
| 23 | Ioannina | 79,395 | ▲23.1% | ▲1 |
| 24 | Nea Anchialos / Volos | 65,485 | ▼6.5% | ▼1 |
| 25 | Paros | 40,171 | ▲10,2% | Steady |
| 26 | Ikaria | 39,679 | ▲9.7% | Steady |
| 27 | Milos | 39,239 | ▲27.5% | ▲2 |
| 28 | Sitia | 34,870 | ▼3% | ▼1 |
| 29 | Kithira | 33,183 | ▲0.0 | ▼1 |
| 30 | Naxos | 31,685 | ▲35.1% | ▲2 |
| 31 | Leros | 29,250 | ▲13.9% | ▼1 |
| 32 | Kalymnos | 24,511 | ▲18.5% | ▼1 |
| 33 | Syros | 15,399 | ▲12.2% | ▲1 |
| 34 | Astypalaia | 13,772 | ▲15.3% | ▲1 |
| 35 | Skyros | 12,831 | ▼37% | ▼2 |
| 36 | Kastellorizo | 8,196 | ▲3.1% | Steady |
| 37 | Kastoria | 4,098 | ▼19.8% | Steady |
| 38 | Kasos | 3,478 | ▲6.5% | ▲1 |
| 39 | Kozani | 2,707 | ▼22.7% | ▼1 |

== 2013 ==
| Rank | Airport | Total passengers | Annual change | Rank change |
|---|---|---|---|---|
| 1 | Athens | 12,459,801 | ▼3.1% | Steady |
| 2 | Heraklion | 5,778,764 | ▲14.4% | Steady |
| 3 | Rhodes | 4,200,059 | ▲10.1% | ▲1 |
| 4 | Thessaloniki | 4,039,576 | ▲0.8% | ▼1 |
| 5 | Corfu | 2,106,827 | ▲10.0% | Steady |
| 6 | Chania | 2,078,857 | ▲13.4% | Steady |
| 7 | Kos | 2,028,618 | ▲12.8% | Steady |
| 8 | Zakynthos | 1,004,486 | ▲15.3% | Steady |
| 9 | Santorini | 898,153 | ▲3.1% | Steady |
| 10 | Mykonos | 584,559 | ▲16.4% | Steady |
| 11 | Cephalonia | 430,362 | ▲13.7% | ▲1 |
| 12 | Mytilene | 400,911 | ▼3% | ▼1 |
| 13 | Samos | 343,717 | ▼5.7% | Steady |
| 14 | Aktion / Preveza | 316,435 | ▲9.5% | Steady |
| 15 | Skiathos | 265,773 | ▲4.1% | ▼1 |
| 16 | Kavala | 209,400 | ▲3% | Steady |
| 17 | Chios | 173,540 | ▼7.2% | Steady |
| 18 | Alexandroupolis | 168,771 | ▼20.5% | ▼2 |
| 19 | Karpathos | 168,190 | ▼0.6% | Steady |
| 20 | Araxos | 139,689 | ▲5.4% | Steady |
| 21 | Kalamata | 136,992 | ▲36% | Steady |
| 22 | Lemnos | 81,201 | ▼3.1% | Steady |
| 23 | Nea Anchialos / Volos | 70,079 | ▼9.7% | Steady |
| 24 | Ioannina | 64,489 | ▼9.4% | Steady |
| 25 | Paros | 36,429 | ▲3.2% | ▲1 |
| 26 | Ikaria | 36,162 | ▼5.5% | ▼1 |
| 27 | Sitia | 35,962 | ▼3% | ▼1 |
| 28 | Kithira | 33,183 | ▲19.6% | Steady |
| 29 | Milos | 30,744 | ▲5% | ▼1 |
| 30 | Leros | 25,680 | ▼11.8% | ▼1 |
| 31 | Kalymnos | 20,677 | ▲4% | ▲1 |
| 32 | Naxos | 23,442 | ▼2.3% | ▼1 |
| 33 | Skyros | 20,368 | ▲77.1% | Steady |
| 34 | Syros | 13,715 | ▲19.2% | ▲1 |
| 35 | Astypalaia | 11,940 | ▼4.9% | ▼1 |
| 36 | Kastellorizo | 7,946 | ▼0.04% | ▼1 |
| 37 | Kastoria | 5,115 | ▲10.7% | ▼1 |
| 38 | Kozani | 3,504 | ▲9.2% | ▲1 |
| 39 | Kasos | 3,265 | ▼15.1% | ▼1 |
