= Astra Airlines =

Greek airline (2008–2019)

IATA	ICAO	Call sign
A2	AZI	GREEK STAR
- Founded: 2008
- Commenced operations: July 5, 2008
- Ceased operations: 18 November 2019
- AOC #: GR-028
- Hubs: Thessaloniki International Airport
- Focus cities: Athens International Airport
- Frequent-flyer program: Astra Miles
- Fleet size: 4
- Destinations: 37
- Headquarters: Thessaloniki, Greece
- Key people: Ioannis Zlatanis (Chairman)
- Website: astra-airlines.gr

Astra Airlines was a Greek regional airline headquartered in Thessaloniki and based at Thessaloniki International Airport.

== History ==
The carrier was founded by Ioannis Zlatanis, founder of Interaviator Ltd, and Anastasios Zirinis, former CEO of Olympic Aviation. It launched operations on 5 July 2008, flying from Thessaloniki to Rhodes.

On 9 November 2019, it was reported that Astra Airlines faced severe financial difficulties and was searching for an investor to maintain its current operations. The airline grounded all flights on the same day until further notice. On 14 November 2019, IATA announced that it had suspended the airline and warned Greek travel agents to stop selling tickets on the airline with immediate effect.

On 18 November 2019, it was reported that the airline would not resume operations for good.

== Destinations ==
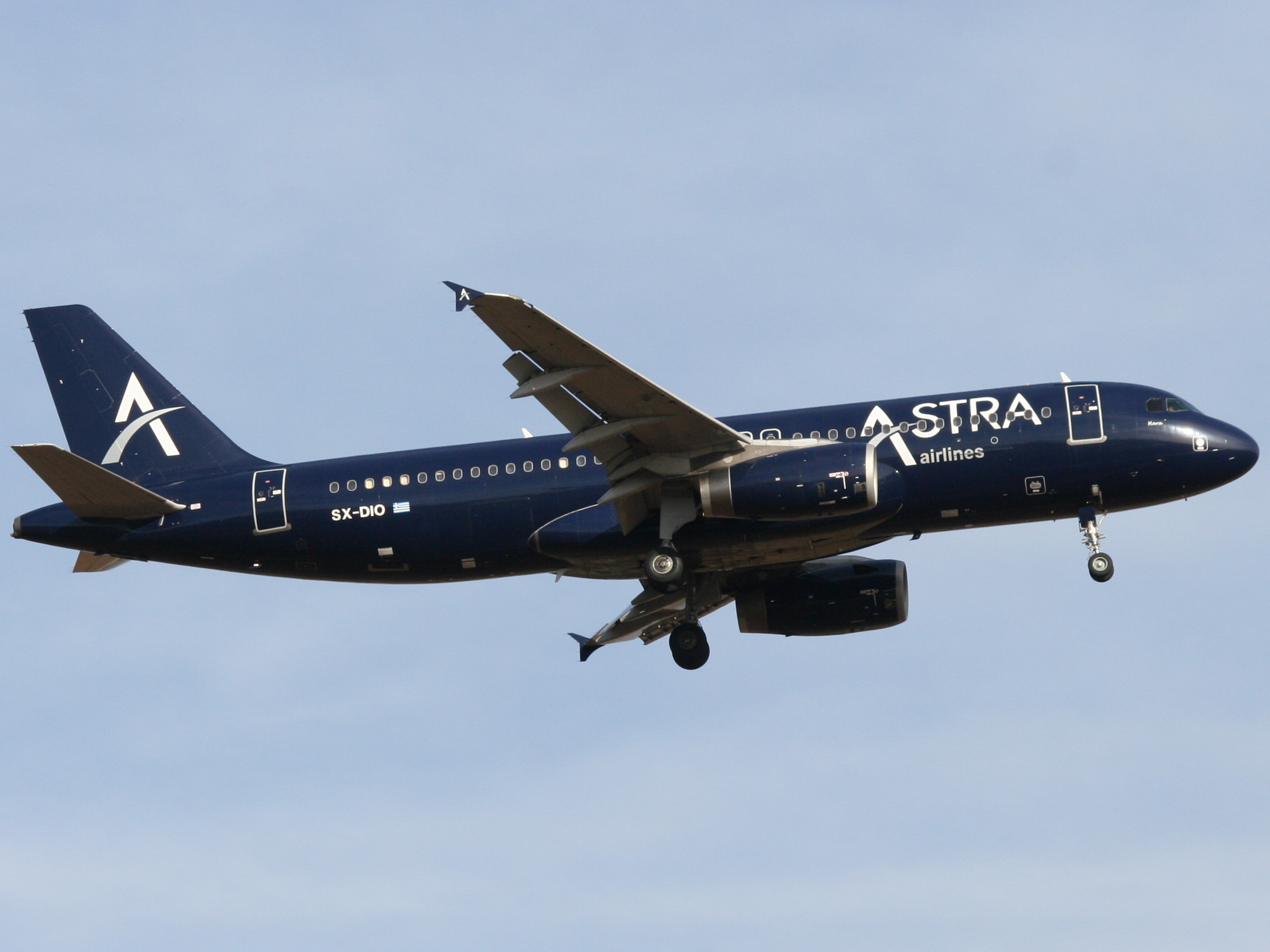
A former Astra Airlines Airbus A320-200. The type meanwhile has been phased out.

As of May 2016, Astra Airlines served the following destinations

Country	City/Region	Airport	Notes
Germany	Munich	Munich Airport	Seasonal
Greece	Athens	Athens International Airport	Focus City
Greece	Chios	Chios Island National Airport	
Greece	Corfu	Corfu International Airport	
Greece	Heraklion	Heraklion International Airport	
Greece	Ikaria	Ikaria Island National Airport	
Greece	Kalamata	Kalamata International Airport	
Greece	Karpathos	Karpathos Island National Airport	Seasonal
Greece	Kastoria	Kastoria National Airport	
Greece	Kithira	Kithira Island National Airport	Seasonal
Greece	Kos	Kos Island International Airport	
Greece	Kozani	Kozani National Airport	
Greece	Lemnos	Lemnos International Airport	
Greece	Milos	Milos Island National Airport	Seasonal
Greece	Mykonos	Mykonos Island National Airport	Seasonal
Greece	Mytilene	Mytilene International Airport	
Greece	Samos	Samos International Airport	
Greece	Santorini	Santorini (Thira) National Airport	Seasonal
Greece	Sitia	Sitia Public Airport	
Greece	Thessaloniki	Thessaloniki International Airport	Hub
Greece	Zakynthos	Zakynthos International Airport	Seasonal
Israel	Tel Aviv	Ben Gurion Airport	Seasonal Charter

== Fleet ==
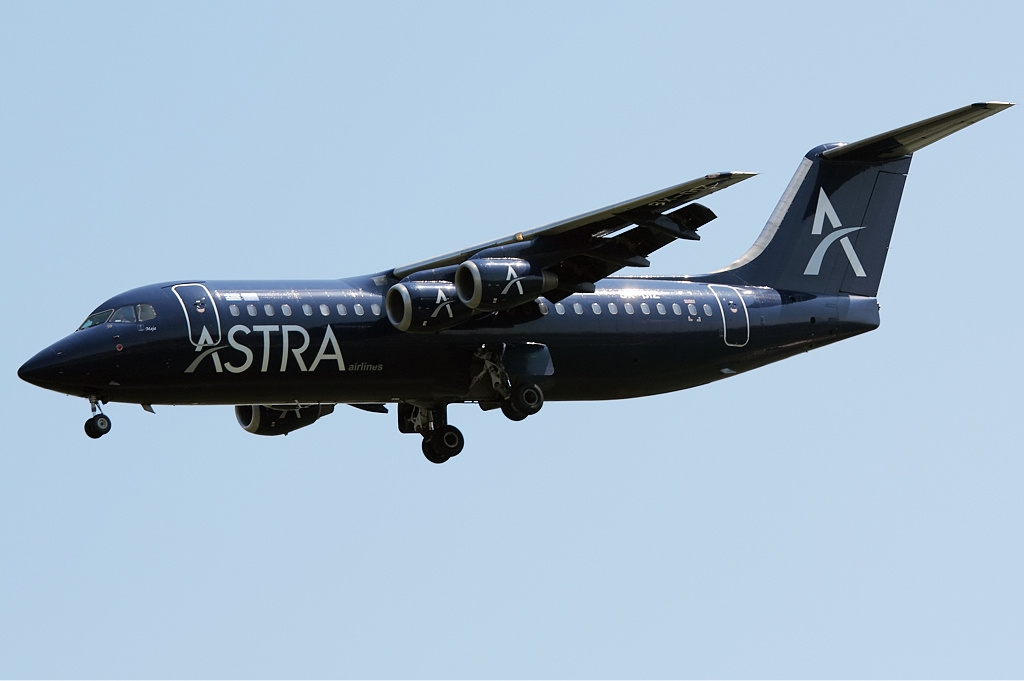
Astra Airlines BAe 146-300

As of August 2019, the Astra Airlines fleet consisted of the following aircraft:

Astra Airlines fleet
Aircraft	In fleet	On order	Passengers			Notes
Aircraft	In fleet	On order	C	Y	Total	Notes
ATR 42-300	2	—	0	48	48	
ATR 72-200	1	—	0	70	70	
BAe 146-300	1	—	0	112	112	
Total	4	—				
