= Island Airport =

Island Airport may refer to:

== Australia ==
- Christmas Island Airport
- King Island Airport, Tasmania
- Lord Howe Island Airport
- Norfolk Island Airport

== Bahamas ==
- Darby Island Airport
- Mores Island Airport

== Canada ==
- Billy Bishop Toronto City Airport, Ontario
- Pelee Island Airport, Ontario

== Greece ==
- Chios Island National Airport
- Kasos Island Public Airport
- Skyros Island National Airport
- Syros Island National Airport

== Indonesia ==
- Alor Island Airport

== Mozambique ==
- Benguerra Island Airport

== Myanmar ==
- Coco Island Airport

== New Zealand ==
- Chatham Islands / Tuuta Airport

== Nicaragua ==
- Corn Island Airport

== Saint Vincent and the Grenadines ==
- Union Island Airport

== Seychelles ==
- Bird Island Airport
- Praslin Island Airport

== Taiwan ==
- Taiping Island Airport

== United Kingdom ==
- Walney Aerodrome, Cumbria, England

== United States ==
- Barter Island LRRS Airport, Alaska
- Crow Island Airport, Massachusetts
- Cyril E. King Airport, Saint Thomas, U.S. Virgin Islands
- Jekyll Island Airport, Georgia
- Long Island MacArthur Airport, New York
- Mackinac Island Airport, Michigan
- Marco Island Airport, Florida
- McKinnon St. Simons Island Airport, Georgia
- Merritt Island Airport, Florida
- Orcas Island Airport, Washington
- Pine Island Airport, North Carolina
- Plum Island Airport, Massachusetts
- Tangier Island Airport, Virginia
