= AXD (disambiguation) =

AXD may refer to:

- AxD, Alexander disease
- AXD, IATA code for Alexandroupoli Airport
- AXD, designation of Japanese Imperial Navy 2 x D.510J
