= JTY =

JTY may refer to:

- Astypalaia Island National Airport, in Greece
- Jatayu Airlines, an Indonesian airline
