= JNX =

JNX may refer to:

- JNX, the IATA code for Naxos Island National Airport, Greece
- JNX, the Pinyin code for Jinan West railway station, China
