= Ioannina National Airport =

Airport in Greece

Ioannina National Airport "King Pyrrhus"
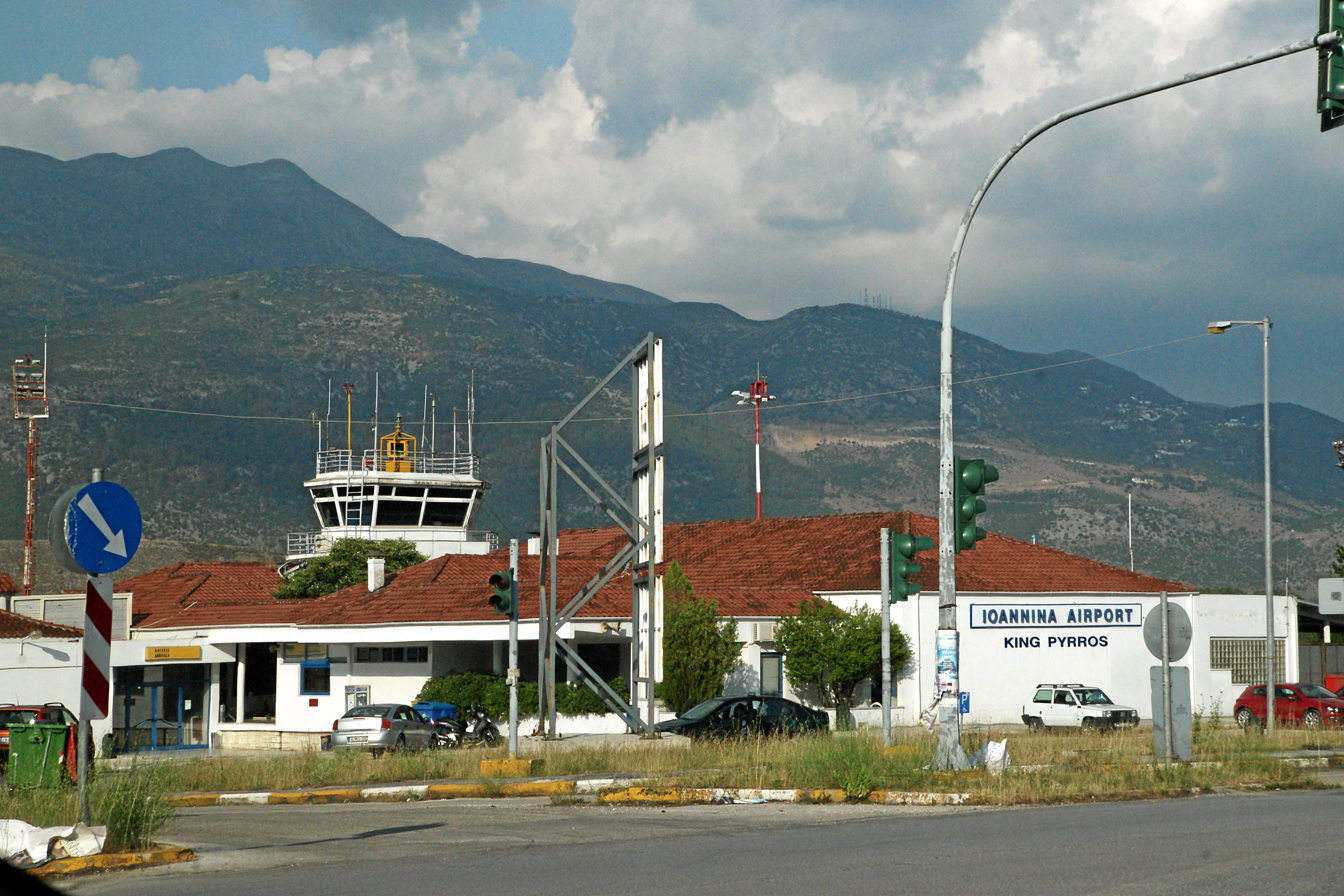
- The former passenger terminal.
- IATA: IOA; ICAO: LGIO

Summary
- Airport type: International
- Owner: Greek State
- Operator: HCAA
- Serves: Ioannina
- Location: Ioannina
- Opened: 1932
- Elevation AMSL: 1,558 ft (475 m)
- Coordinates: 39°41′47″N 20°49′21″E
- Website: ioanninaairport.eu

Map
- Location of airport in Greece

Runways
Direction	Length		Surface
Direction	ft	m	Surface
14/32	7,881	2,402	Asphalt

Statistics (2025)
- Passengers: 145,504
- Passenger traffic change: ▲13.7%
- Aircraft movements: 1,900
- Aircraft movements change: ▲6.0%
- Statistics

Ioannina Νational Airport (Greek: Κρατικός Αερολιμένας Ιωαννίνων) (IATA: IOA, ICAO: LGIO) is an airport located four kilometers from the city center of Ioannina, Greece. Its full name is Ioannina Νational Airport – King Pyrrhus (Βασιλεύς Πύρρος).

== History ==
Ioannina airport was established in 1932. The original 450 m^{2} terminal building was built in 1953 and then expanded to double the area in 1953 and by a further 600 m^{2} in 1993. The airport was named "King Pyrros" in 2007. Constructions of the new control tower and taxiway were completed in 2017. On 11 July 2019 the new airport terminal was completed and commissioned. It includes a new departure and arrival hall and a waiting area for passengers as well as a restaurant and Duty-free area.

== Airport facilities ==
The Runway has a length of 2,400 meters and a width of 45 meters with three taxiways and a 43 m² apron. The firefighting capability is Category 6 (VI). The terminal has an area of 5,290 m².

== Airlines and destinations ==
The following airlines operate regular scheduled and charter flights at Ioannina Airport:

Airlines	Destinations
Aegean Airlines	Athens
Atlantic Airways	Seasonal charter: Billund
Copenhagen AirTaxi (operated for Airseven)	Seasonal charter: Aalborg, Lulea, Orebro, Sundsvall(begins 19 August)
Scandinavian Airlines	Seasonal charter: Copenhagen, Gothenburg, Oslo, Stavanger, Stockholm-Arlanda

== Traffic statistics ==
Annual passenger traffic
Year	Flights total	Domestic passengers	International passengers	Total passengers	% Annual change total
1994	1,648	79,844	218	80,062	Steady
1995	1,935	95,994	114	96,108	▲20.0%
1996	2,101	110,165	775	110,940	▲15.4%
1997	1,946	108,745	48	108,793	▼1.90%
1998	1,975	107,410	4	107,414	▼1.30%
1999	2,198	119,196	227	119,423	▲11.2%
2000	3,492	175,240	611	175,851	▲47.3%
2001	3,352	146,888	74	146,962	▼16.4%
2002	2,981	125,894	0	125,894	▼14.3%
2003	2,757	135,206	402	135,608	▲7.70%
2004	2,936	145,602	445	146,047	▲7.70%
2005	2,618	128,100	1,298	129,398	▼11.4%
2006	2,172	125,731	508	126,239	▼2.40%
2007	2,308	138,104	2,770	140,874	▲11.6%
2008	2,186	129,939	973	130.912	▼7.10%
2009	2,428	137,253	729	137,982	▲5.40%
2010	2,190	119,329	695	120,024	▼13.3%
2011	1,620	88,271	326	88,597	▼26.2%
2012	1,364	70,937	254	71,191	▼19.6%
2013	1,180	64,479	10	64,489	▼9.40%
2014	1,198	79,389	6	79,395	▲23.1%
2015	1,338	86,515	8	86,523	▲9.00%
2016	1,426	97,105	17	97,122	▲12.2%
2017	1,394	89,858	6,492	95,585	▼1.00%
2018	1,598	89,096	19,836	108,932	▲14.9%
2019	2,146	104,109	26,235	130,344	▲23.0%
2020	908	36,856	5	36,861	▼71.5%
2021	1,222	49,042	13,187	62,229	▲68.8%
2022	1,304	70,507	20,946	91,453	▲46.9%
2023	1,559	91,511	28,389	119,900	▲31.1%
2024	1,792	94,675	33,351	128,026	▲6.8%
2025	1,900	103,743	41,761	145,504	▲13.7%
2026*	1,418	86,906	55,784	142,619	▲23.0%

- Jan-Sep 2026

The table below shows passenger totals at Ioannina Airport by country destination during 2025.

Passenger traffic by destination country (2025)
Rank	Country destination	Passengers
1	Greece	103,743
2	Sweden	19,600
3	Denmark	13,957
4	Norway	5,609
5	Finland	1,664
6	Israel	598
7	Other	180

== See also ==
- Transport in Greece
- List of the busiest airports in Greece
