= Leros Municipal Airport =

Airport in Greece

Leros Municipal Airport Δημοτικός Αερολιμένας Λέρου
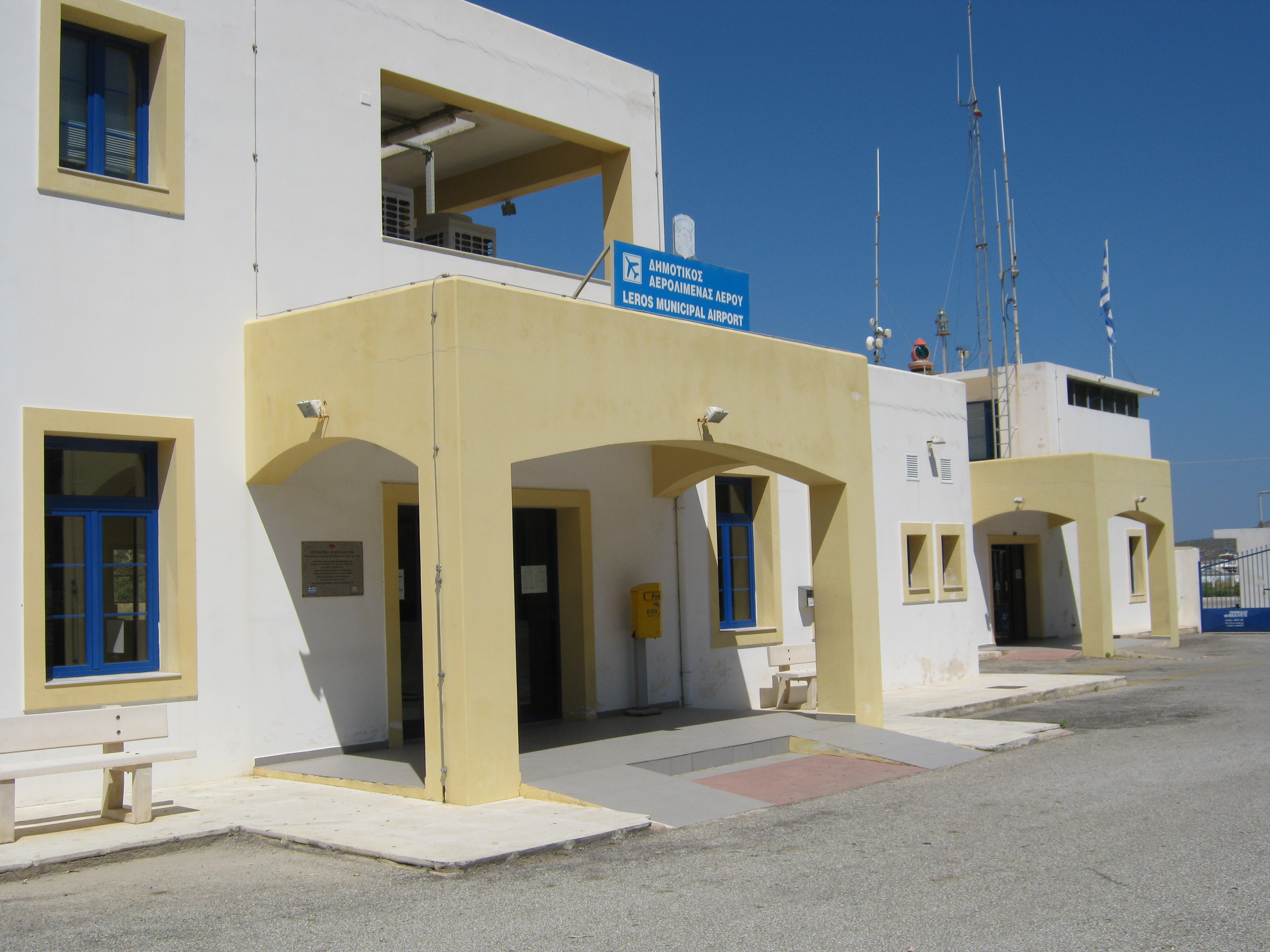
- IATA: LRS; ICAO: LGLE

Summary
- Airport type: Public
- Operator: Hellenic Civil Aviation Authority
- Location: Leros, Greece
- Elevation AMSL: 39 ft (12 m)
- Coordinates: 37°11′05″N 026°48′01″E

Map
- Location of airport in Greece

Runways
Direction	Length		Surface
Direction	m	ft	Surface
14/32	1,012	3,320	Asphalt

Statistics (2017)
- Passengers: 27,606
- Passenger traffic change: ▲9.5%
- Aircraft movements: 1,396
- Aircraft movements change: ▲1.2%
- Source: HCAA

Leros Municipal Airport (Greek: Δημοτικός Αερολιμένας Λέρου, Dimotikós Aeroliménas Lérou) (IATA: LRS, ICAO: LGLE) is an airport serving the island of Leros in Greece. It is also known as Leros Public Airport or Leros Airport. The airport began operations in 1984. The airport is small with limited facilities; there is only a small cafe and a ticket office of the Olympic airlines. With a runway length of just over one kilometer, the airport can only handle small 50-seat aircraft.

== Airlines and destinations ==
The following airlines operate regular scheduled and charter flights at Leros Municipal Airport:

Airlines	Destinations
Olympic Air	Athens
Sky Express	Astypalaia, Kalymnos, Kos, Rhodes

== See also ==
- Transport in Greece
