= Kastellorizo Airport =

Kastellorizo Public Airport
- IATA: KZS; ICAO: LGKJ

Summary
- Airport type: Public
- Owner: Greek State
- Operator: HCAA
- Serves: Megisti, Kastellorizo
- Location: Kastellorizo
- Elevation AMSL: 474 ft (144 m)
- Coordinates: 36°08′30″N 29°34′35″E

Map
- Location of airport in Greece

Runways
Direction	Length		Surface
Direction	ft	m	Surface
13/31	2,624	800	Asphalt

Statistics (2018)
- Passengers: 5,434
- Passenger traffic change: ▼0.9%
- Aircraft movements: 337
- Aircraft movements change: ▼19.4%
- Runway, Statistics

Kastellorizo Island Public Airport is an airport on the small island Kastellorizo, Greece (IATA: KZS, ICAO: LGKJ), part of the Dodecanese island group. It is the eastmost airport of Greece.

== History ==
In the beginning of the twentieth century, the island of Kastellorizo was linked by seaplanes to destinations mainly in northeast Africa. The seaplanes used the natural horse-shoe sized harbour of the island. The current Kastellorizo Airport first began operations in 1986 as a domestic airport. The airport has a small terminal of 150 m^{2} and the apron can accommodate one Bombardier Dash 8 sized aircraft and 3 light general aviation aircraft.

== Airlines and destinations ==
The following airlines operate regular scheduled and charter flights at Kastellorizo Airport:

Airlines	Destinations
Olympic Air	Rhodes

== Statistics ==
Annual passenger statistics history

Year	Flights	Passengers	Passengers change
2005	470	8,243	▼0.7%
2006	480	9,626	▲16.8%
2007	494	9,564	▼0.6%
2008	450	8,329	▼12.9%
2009	450	7,490	▼10.1%
2010	337	7,817	▲4.4%
2011	486	8,723	▲11.6%
2012	536	7.943	▼8.9%
2013	520	7,946	▲0.0%
2014	530	8,196	▲3.1%
2015	498	8,019	▼2.1%
2016	492	6,907	▼13.9%
2017	418	5,482	▼20.6%
2018	337	5,434	▼0.9%

== Ground transport ==
The facility is located more or less on the middle of the island, about 2.5 km southwest of the city Megisti. The airport is linked to the city by a single bus only during the summer period. Taxis are also available.

== See also ==
- Transport in Greece
