= Kalymnos Island National Airport =

Kalymnos National Airport Κρατικός Αερολιμένας Καλύμνου
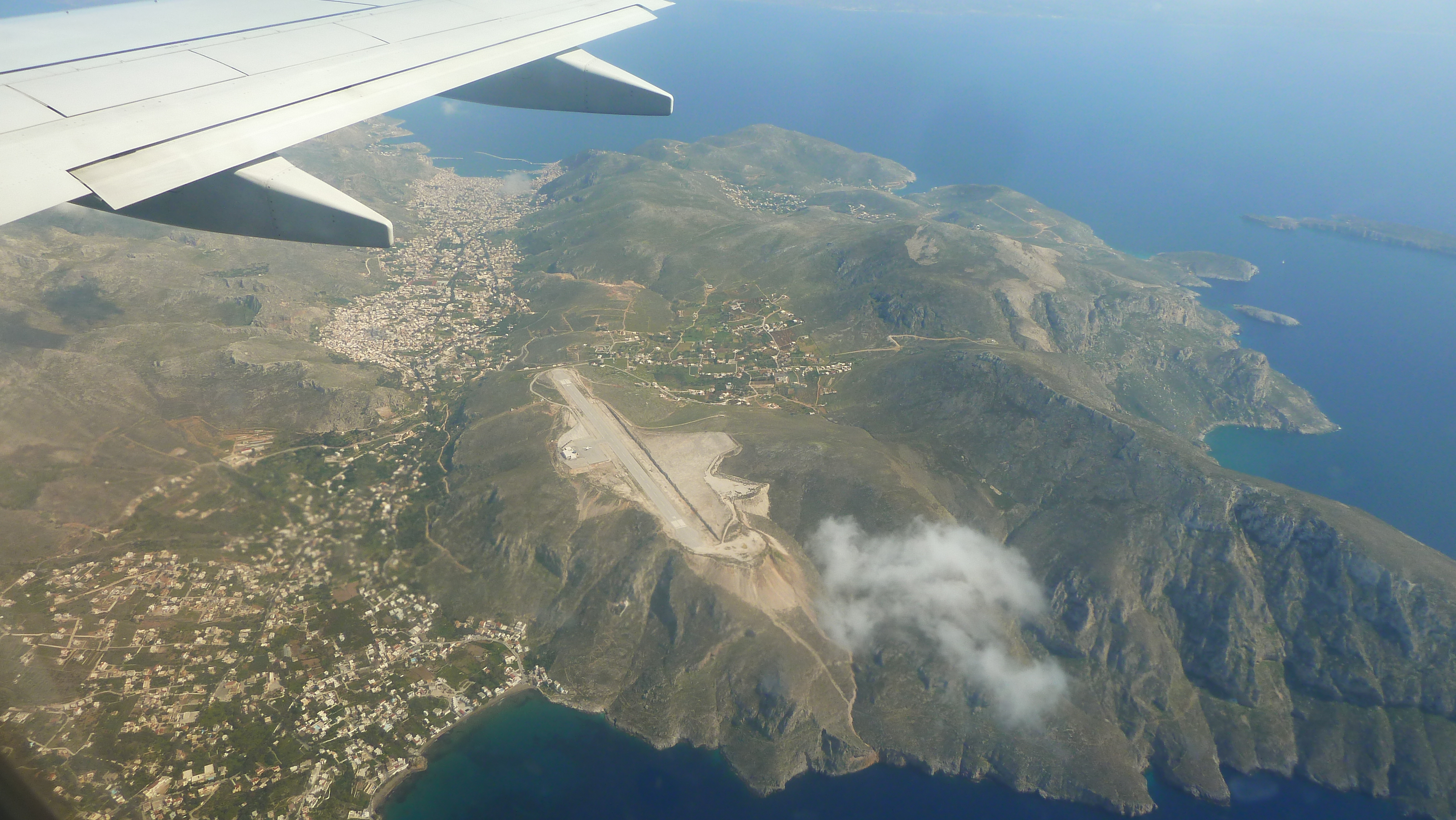
- IATA: JKL; ICAO: LGKY

Summary
- Airport type: Public
- Operator: Hellenic Civil Aviation Authority
- Location: Kalymnos, Greece
- Elevation AMSL: 771 ft (235 m)
- Coordinates: 36°57′48″N 26°56′26″E

Map
- Location of airport in Greece

Runways
Direction	Length		Surface
Direction	m	ft	Surface
10/28	1,135	3,723	Asphalt

Statistics (2019)
- Passengers: 10,976
- Passenger traffic change: ▲2.9%
- Aircraft movements: 828
- Aircraft movements change: ▲1.2%
- Sources:HCAA

Kalymnos Island National Airport (Greek: Κρατικός Αερολιμένας Καλύμνου) (IATA: JKL, ICAO: LGKY) is an airport on the island of Kalymnos in Greece. The airport is located a few kilometers from Pothaia (or Pothia), the capital of Kalymnos. It is also known as Kalymnos National Airport.

== History ==
This airport commenced operations on 10 August 2006.

== Airlines and destinations ==
The following airlines operate regular scheduled and charter flights at Kalymnos Island National Airport:

Airlines	Destinations
Sky Express	Astypalaia, Athens, Kos, Leros, Rhodes

== See also ==
- Transport in Greece
