= Alexandroupoli Airport =

Alexandroupoli Airport "Dimokritos"
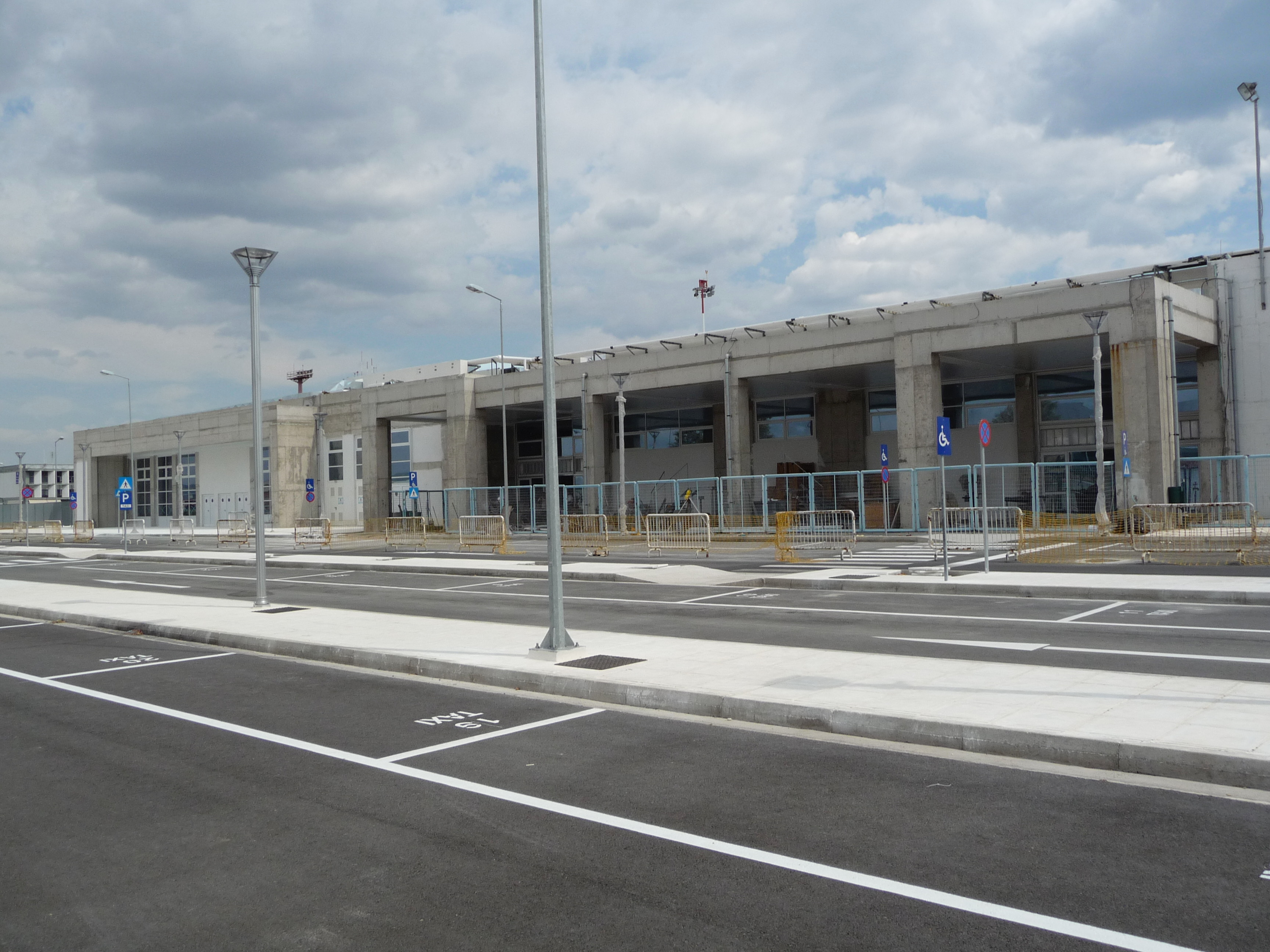
- IATA: AXD; ICAO: LGAL

Summary
- Owner: Greek state
- Operator: HCAA
- Serves: Alexandroupoli
- Location: Apalos, Greece
- Elevation AMSL: 24 ft (7.3 m)
- Coordinates: 40°51′21.13″N 025°57′22.55″E

Map
- Location within Greece

Runways
Direction	Length		Surface
Direction	ft	m	Surface
07/25	8,471	2,582	Asphalt

Statistics (2025)
- Passengers: 328,913
- Passenger traffic change: ▲8,2%
- Aircraft movements: 328,913
- Aircraft movements change: ▲11,4%
- Sources:HCAA, World Aero Data

Alexandroupoli Airport "Dimokritos" or "Democritus" (Greek: Κρατικός Αερολιμένας Αλεξανδρούπολης "Δημόκριτος", Kratikós Aeroliménas Alexandrúpolis "Dimókritos") (IATA: AXD, ICAO: LGAL) is an airport 7 km east of Alexandroupolis in northeastern Greece on main national road E90. It is located near the village of Apalos, which belongs to the municipality of Alexandroupoli. The airport was built in 1944. In 1955, it became an international airport; the current buildings and runway were constructed in 1975.

The airport was named after Democritus, the ancient philosopher born in Abdera.

== Airlines and destinations ==
Airlines	Destinations
Aegean Airlines	Athens; Seasonal: Heraklion
Sky Express	Athens, Sitia

== 2016 Turkish coup d'état attempt ==
On Saturday 16 July 2016, at 11:42 am (UTC+2), a Turkish Black Hawk helicopter sent a distress signal and requested permission for an emergency landing to Greek authorities and landed 8 minutes later (11:50) at the airport after an unsuccessful coup in Turkey. Two Greek F-16s observed the procedure and escorted the helicopter to the airport. Eight Turkish military officers, who were on the helicopter, were arrested after landing. They were transferred to the local police station, while the helicopter was guarded at the airport by the Greek authorities. They were charged with illegal entry into the country. Seven were also charged of instigating illegal flight, while the eighth, who was piloting the helicopter, was accused of executing the illegal flight. The eight officers all requested political asylum in Greece. At night (after 11:00 p.m. (EEST) a second Turkish Black Hawk helicopter with extra crew members arrived at the Greek airport from Turkey in order to retrieve the first helicopter; after the crew checked the helicopter, both helicopters returned to Turkey early on the morning of 17 July.

== See also ==
- Transport in Greece
- List of airports in Greece
- Makedonia Airport
- Alexander the Great Airport
