= Milos Island National Airport =

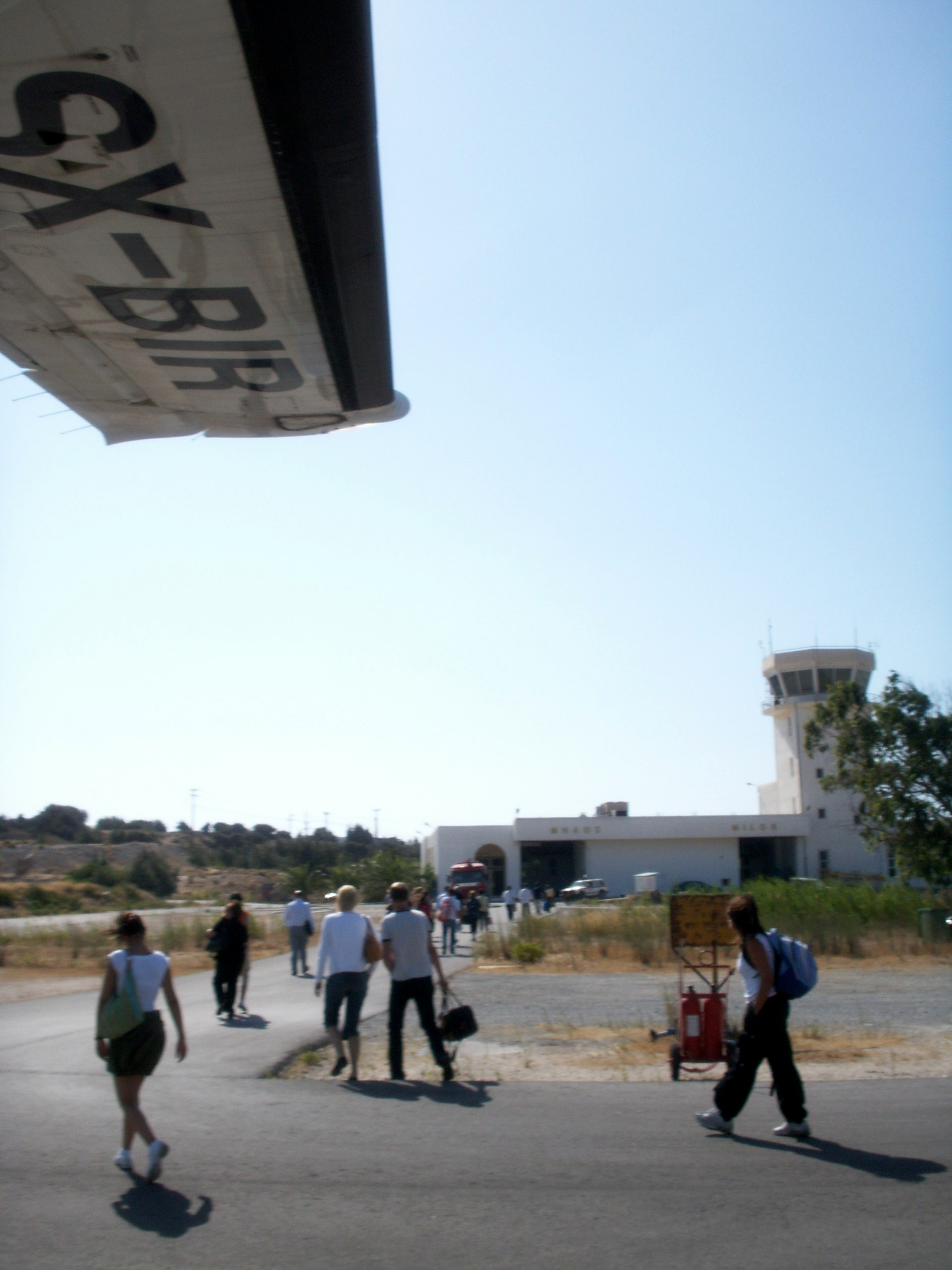
- IATA: MLO; ICAO: LGML

Summary
- Airport type: Public
- Operator: HCAA
- Location: Milos, Greece
- Elevation AMSL: 10 ft (3.0 m)
- Coordinates: 36°41′48.84″N 24°28′36.84″E

Map
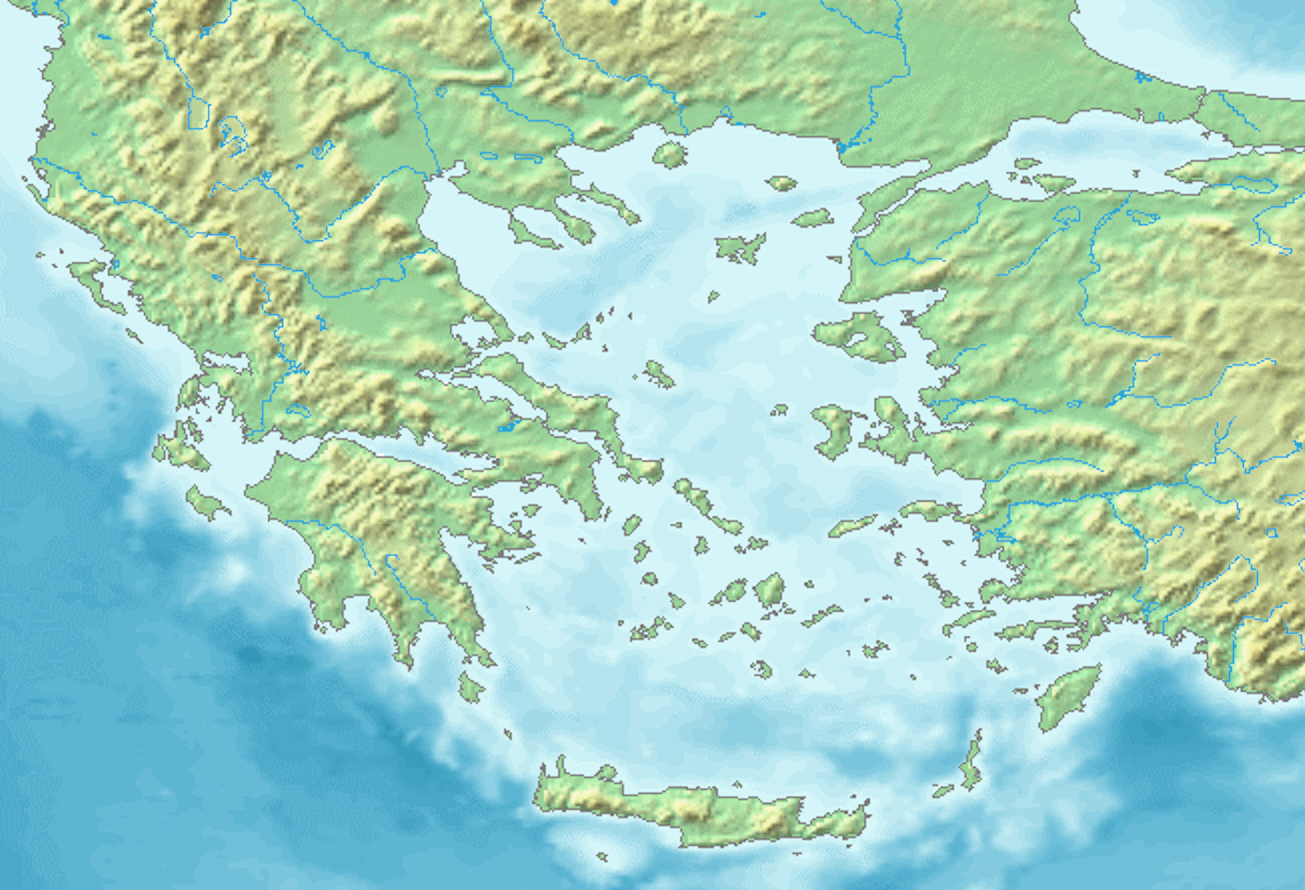
- Location of airport in Greece MLO (Greece) MLO (Mediterranean) MLO (Europe) MLO (Earth)

Runways
Direction	Length		Surface
Direction	ft	m	Surface
08/26	3,380	1,075	Asphalt

Statistics (2018)
- Passengers: 77,501
- Passenger traffic change: ▲65.9%
- Aircraft movements: 2,259
- Aircraft movements change: ▲65.1%
- Sources:HCAA

Milos Island National Airport is an airport in Milos, Greece (IATA: MLO, ICAO: LGML). Milos is an island in the Cyclades. The airport is located 5 kilometers southeast of the harbour of the island. The airport was opened on January 17, 1973. In October 1995, a new terminal was taken into use.

== Infrastructure ==
As the airport has a small apron (7,800 square meters) and a short runway, only Dash 8, ATR 42, or smaller aircraft are able to use the airport. Plans exist for a 2,000 by 45 meter runway at a new location and the expansion of the apron space to 26,000 square meters. However, due to the economical difficulties, these plans have been suspended. The current apron can handle only one Dash 8 sized aircraft or two light aircraft at one given time.

== Airlines and destinations ==
The following airlines operate regular scheduled and charter flights at Milos Island Airport:

Airlines	Destinations
Aegean Airlines	Seasonal: Thessaloniki
Sky Express	Athens

== Statistics ==
Annual passenger throughput

Year	Flights	Passengers	Passengers Change
2001	668	8,782	▼18.0%
2002	906	11,609	▲32.2%
2003	898	15,186	▲30.8%
2004	839	21,439	▲41.2%
2005	766	19,193	▼10.5%
2006	1,248	32,092	▲67.2%
2007	1,320	33,557	▲4.6%
2008	1,230	31,285	▼6.8%
2009	1,211	30,106	▼3.8%
2010	1,350	31,924	▲6.0%
2011	1,286	30,351	▼5.2%
2012	1,254	32,385	▲6.7%
2013	1,026	30,774	▼5.2%
2014	1,248	39,238	▲27.5%
2015	1,656	50,589	▲28.9%
2016	1,694	48,700	▼3.7%
2017	1,368	46,710	▼4.1%
2018	2,259	77,501	▲65.9%

== Ground transport ==
Other than by car, the airport is linked to the rest of the island by taxi. There are bus connections linking to the airport.

== See also ==
- List of the busiest airports in Greece
- Transport in Greece
