= Sitia Public Airport =

Airport in Sitia, Greece

Sitia Municipal Airport
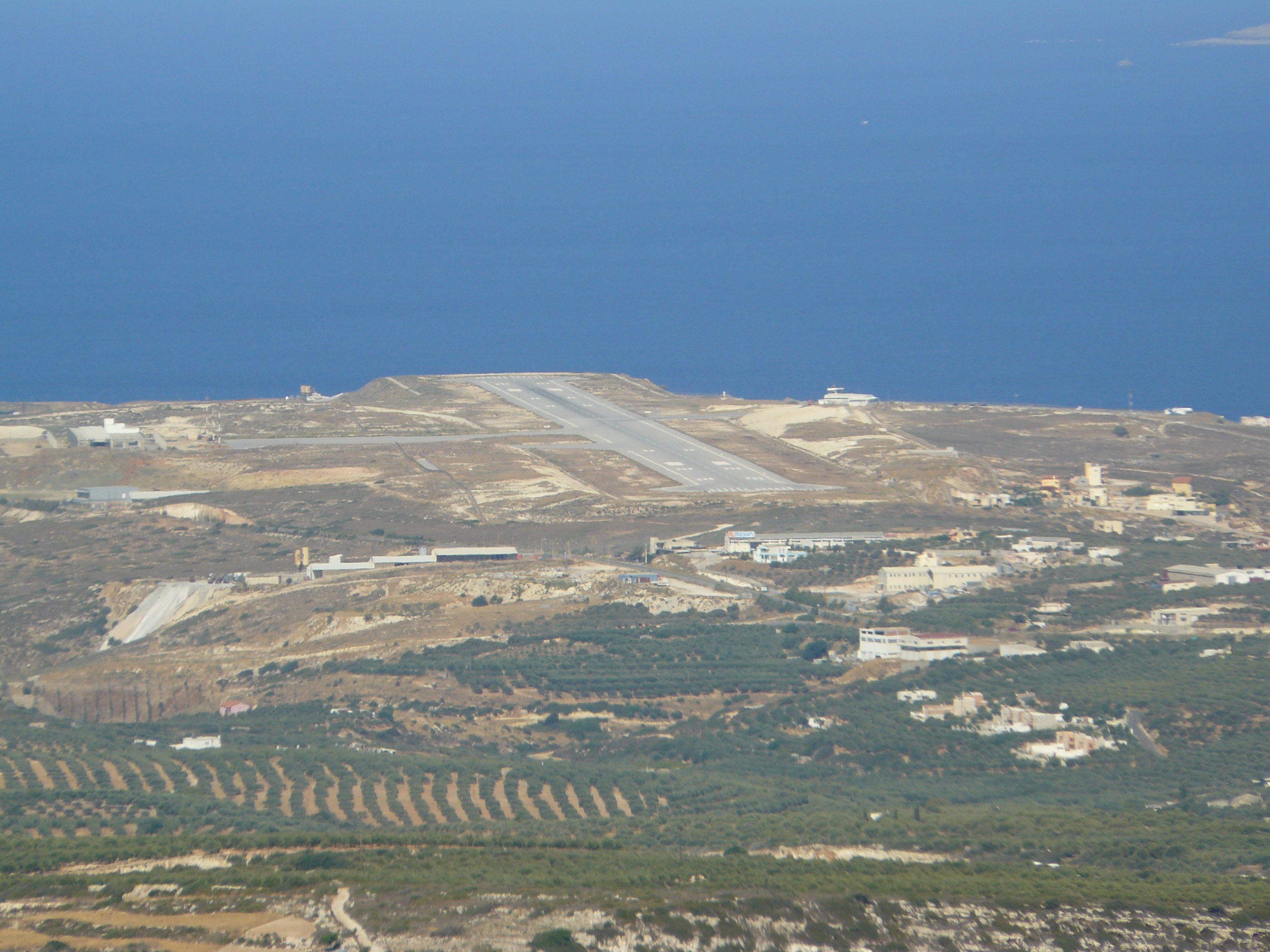
- IATA: JSH; ICAO: LGST

Summary
- Airport type: Public
- Owner: Municipality of Sitia
- Operator: HCAA
- Location: Sitia, Lasithi
- Elevation AMSL: 376 ft (115 m)
- Coordinates: 35°12′57.99″N 26°06′04.77″E

Map
- Location of airport in Greece

Runways
Direction	Length		Surface
Direction	ft	m	Surface
05/23	6,804 x 164	2,074 x 50	Asphalt
17/35 (closed)	2,460 x 82	750 x 25	Asphalt

Statistics (2018)
- Passengers: 61,877
- Passenger traffic change: ▲90.5%
- Aircraft movements: 1,730
- Aircraft movements change: ▲36.0%
- Sources: HCAA

Sitia Airport (IATA: JSH, ICAO: LGST) is a small community airport in the region Mponta of Sitia Municipality, on the eastern part of Crete in Greece. The facility is serving the city of Sitia. The airport is located 1 km north/northwest of the city center.

== History ==
Sitia Airport began operations on 7 June 1984 when the first aircraft landed on the facility. This was an Olympic Airways' Dornier Do-228, registration SX-BHF. This was a test flight, to test the airport and its handling facilities. The airport was officially opened 2 days later, on 9 June 1984. Its official name became Δημοτικός Αερολιμένας Σητείας, literally Municipal Airport of Sitia. At 10:30 the same day, the first official flight, OAL 7001, arrived. On 13 June, the first flight from Rhodes arrived, followed by a flight from the neighbouring island Karpathos the next day.

On 20 May 1993, the airport's services moved to a newly built terminal building and control tower. The new installations cover an area of 550 m^{2}. A new runway, oriented 05/23 and with a length of 2,074 meters was completed in May 2003. Also, 3 new taxiways and 2 new aircraft stands have been constructed. Additionally, the old terminal building has been replaced by a temporary building, covering an area of 1,000 m^{2}. On 13 January 13, 2016, the airport's services moved to a new terminal building. The new building has an area of 7,500 m^{2}.

== Airlines and destinations ==
The following airlines operate regular scheduled and charter flights at Sitia Airport:

Airlines	Destinations
Olympic Air	Athens, Karpathos, Kasos, Rhodes
Sky Express	Alexandroupoli, Preveza/Lefkada

== Statistics ==
Annual Passenger Throughput

Year	Flights	Passengers	Change in Passengers (%)
2001	93	1,945	▲15.1
2002	42	1,762	▼9.4
2003	666	13,144	▲646.0
2004	411	16,731	▲27,3
2005	781	19,283	▲15.3
2006	940	22,902	▲18.8
2007	1,804	35,218	▲53.8
2008	1,764	39,711	▲12.8
2009	1,714	38,195	▼3.8
2010	1,805	38,859	▲1.7
2011	1,786	39,604	▲1.9
2012	2,024	37,801	▼4.6
2013	2,064	35,962	▼4.9
2014	1,978	34,873	▼3.0
2015	1,924	27,015	▼22.5
2016	1,766	20,903	▼22.6
2017	1,254	32,479	▲55.4
2018	1,730	61,877	▲95.0
*2019	528	16,425	

- Period: Jan - Jun

== Ground transportation ==
By car the airport can be reached via the main road along the North coast. From Aghios Nikolaos, heading west, the main road transforms into the National Road of Crete. The City of Sitia is just a few minutes drive away from the airport. Besides rental cars, there are taxis available to any destination on Crete. There are no bus connections available from the airport.

== See also ==
- List of airports in Crete
- Transport in Greece
