= Karpathos Island National Airport =

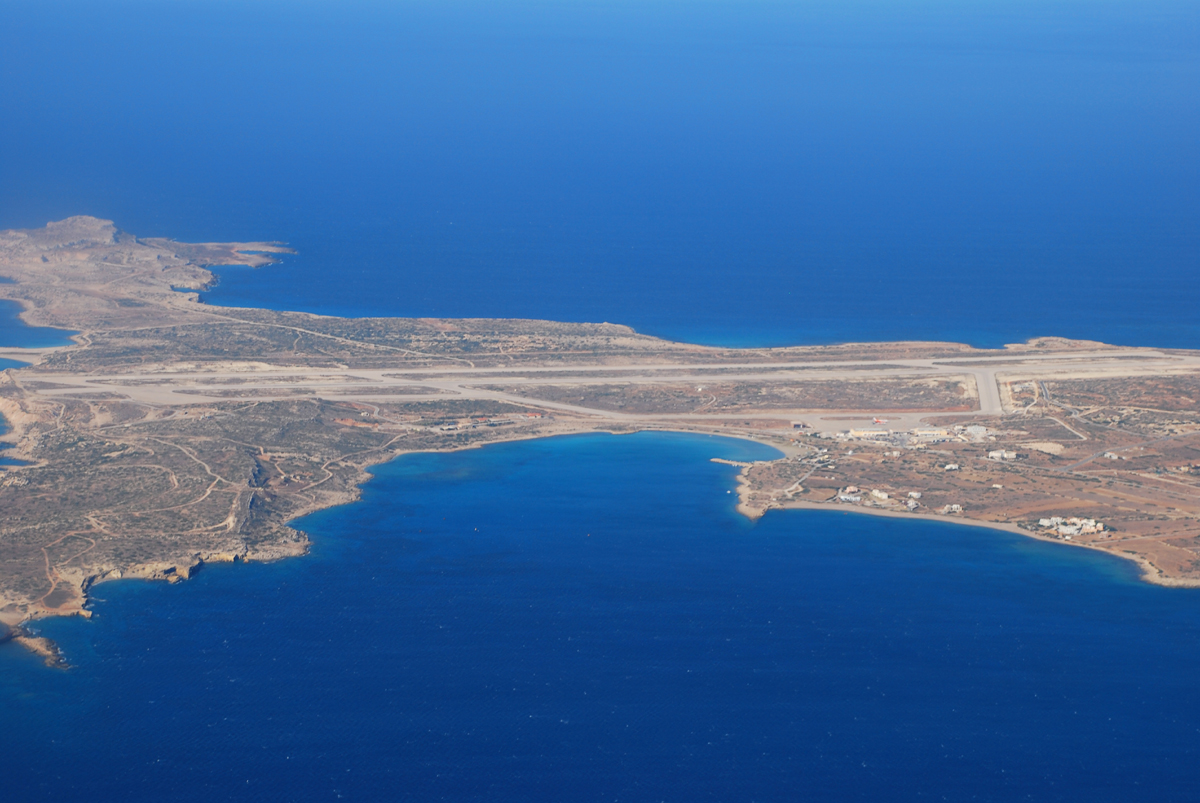
- IATA: AOK; ICAO: LGKP

Summary
- Airport type: Public
- Operator: HCAA
- Location: Karpathos, Greece
- Elevation AMSL: 66 ft (20 m)
- Coordinates: 35°25′14″N 027°08′48″E

Map
- Location of airport in Greece

Runways
Direction	Length		Surface
Direction	ft	m	Surface
12/30	7,871	2,399	Asphalt

Statistics (2019)
- Passengers: 267,828
- Passenger traffic change: ▲5.4%
- Aircraft movements: 3,436
- Aircraft movements change: ▼1.0%
- Source: HCAA

Karpathos Island National Airport (IATA: AOK, ICAO: LGKP) is an airport on the island of Karpathos, Greece. The airport first operated in 1970, and it had very limited facilities (a small building of only 500 m^{2}). As of 2023, its buildings cover an area of 12,500 m^{2}. The current airport facilities were constructed between 2005 and 2009. The inauguration of the new airport terminal took place on 25 July 2009.

A bus route directly connects Karpathos Airport and the capital of the island Pigadia.

== Airlines and destinations ==
The following airlines operate regular scheduled and charter flights at Karpathos Airport:

Airlines	Destinations
Air Haifa	Seasonal: Haifa
Arkia	Tel Aviv
Austrian Airlines	Seasonal: Vienna
Eurowings	Seasonal: Düsseldorf , Graz, Innsbruck, Salzburg
Finnair	Seasonal charter: Helsinki
GoTo Fly	Seasonal: Forlì
Neos	Seasonal: Bologna, Milan-Bergamo, Milan–Malpensa, Rome–Fiumicino, Verona
Olympic Air	Athens, Kasos, Rhodes
Scandinavian Airlines	Seasonal: Oslo
Sky Express	Athens, Rhodes
Smartwings	Seasonal: Prague
Transavia	Seasonal: Amsterdam
TUI fly Nordic	Seasonal charter: Stockholm–Arlanda
Volotea	Seasonal: Naples, Venice, Verona (begins 5 August 2026)

== See also ==
- List of airports in Greece
