= Ikaria Island National Airport =

Coordinates: 37°40′57.78″N 026°20′49.42″E

Ikaria Island National Airport Ikaros
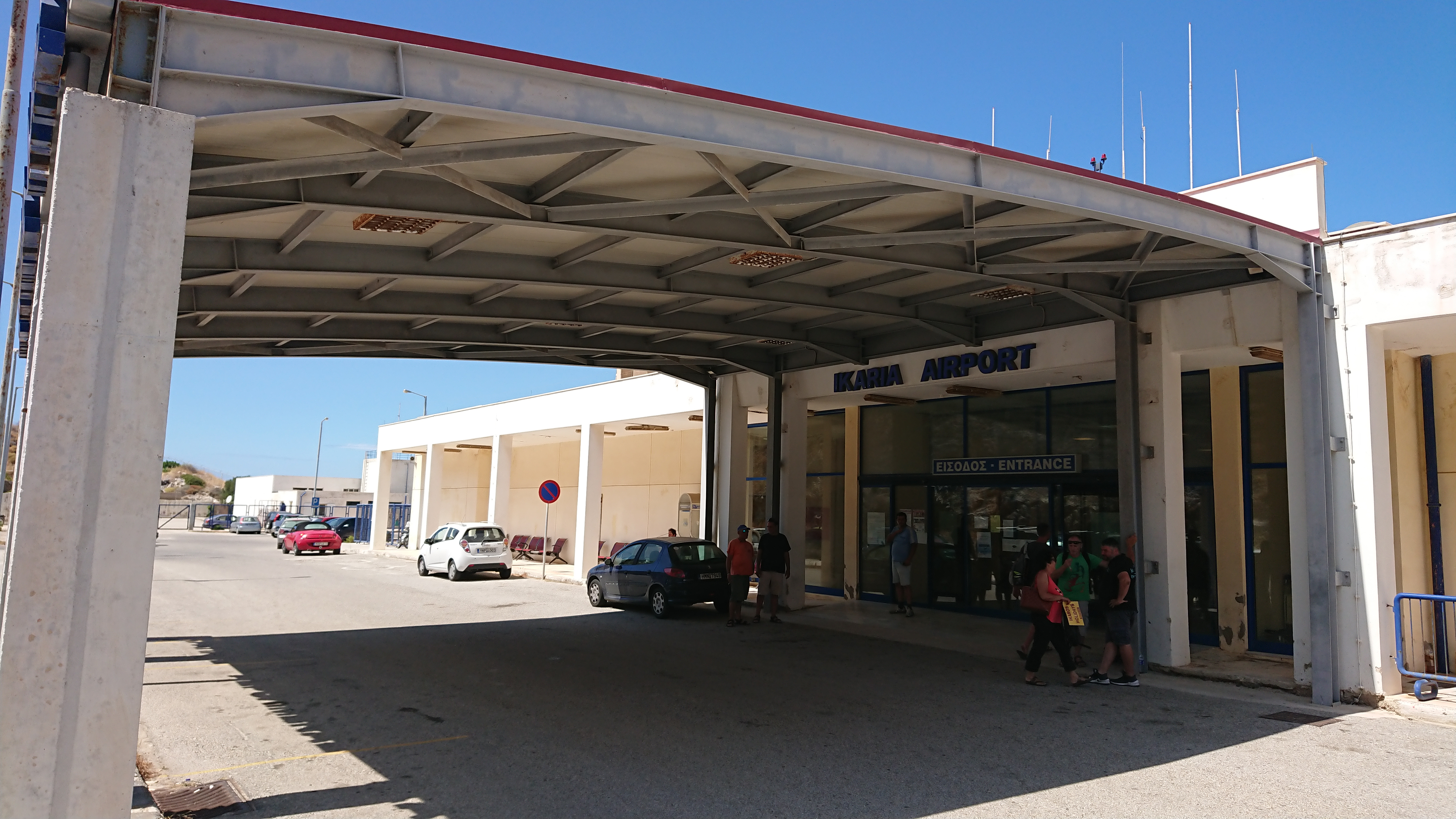
- IATA: JIK; ICAO: LGIK

Summary
- Airport type: Public
- Operator: HCAA
- Serves: Agios Kirykos
- Location: Ikaria Island, Greece
- Elevation AMSL: 79 ft (24 m)

Map
- Location of airport in Greece

Runways
Direction	Length		Surface
Direction	ft	m	Surface
15/33	4,530	1,381	Asphalt

Statistics (2017)
- Passengers: 41,521
- Passenger traffic change: ▲0.7%
- Aircraft movements: 1,400
- Aircraft movements change: ▲5.7%
- Sources:HCAA, World Aero Data

Ikaria Island National Airport Ikaros (IATA: JIK, ICAO: LGIK) is an airport on Ikaria Island, Greece.

The airport was opened on 14 June 1995 with two weekly flights from Olympic Airlines, on the Dornier 228 aircraft. The buildings lie in an area of 1,000 Square Meters. The airport first operated in 1995.

== Airlines and destinations ==
The following airlines operate regular scheduled and charter flights at Ikaria Island Airport:

Airlines	Destinations
Olympic Air	Athens, Lemnos, Thessaloniki
Sky Express	Athens

== See also ==
- Transport in Greece
