= Kasos Island Public Airport =

Coordinates: 35°25′16.89″N 026°54′36.17″E

Kasos Island Municipal Airport
- IATA: KSJ; ICAO: LGKS

Summary
- Airport type: Public
- Owner: City of Kasos
- Operator: HCAA
- Location: Kasos, Greece
- Elevation AMSL: 35 ft (11 m)

Map
- Location of airport in Greece

Runways
Direction	Length		Surface
Direction	ft	m	Surface
09/27	3,221	982	Asphalt

Statistics (2017)
- Passengers: 3,048
- Passenger traffic change: ▼20.7%
- Aircraft movements: 524
- Aircraft movements change: ▼47.1%
- Sources:HCAA, World Aero Data

Kasos Island Public Airport (IATA: KSJ, ICAO: LGKS) is an airport in Kasos, Greece.

== Airlines and destinations ==
The following airlines operate regular scheduled and charter flights at Kasos Island Airport:

Airlines	Destinations
Olympic Air	Karpathos, Rhodes, Sitia

== See also ==
- Transport in Greece
