= Kithira Island National Airport =

Kythira National Airport "Alexandros Aristotelous Onassis"
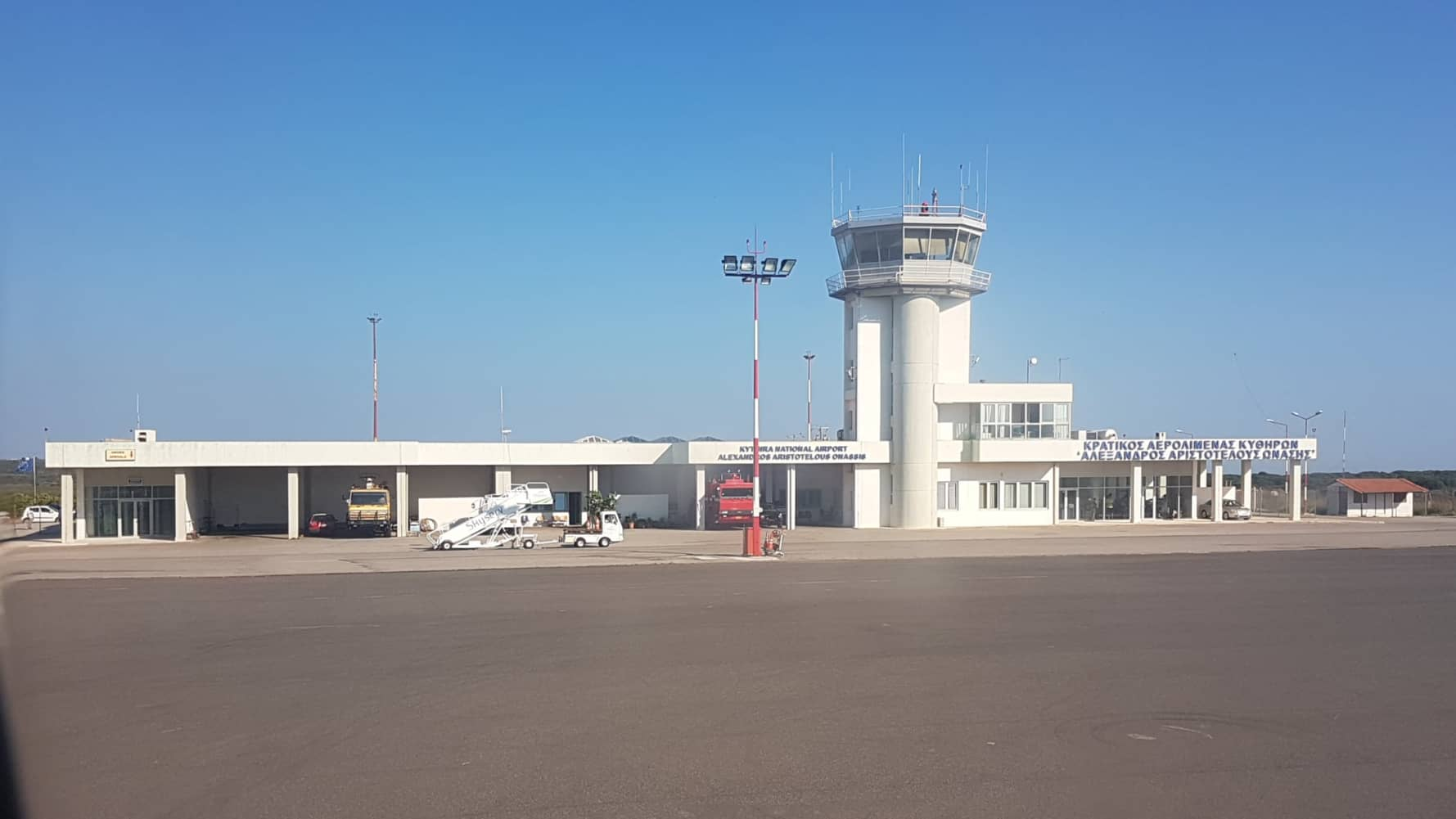
- IATA: KIT; ICAO: LGKC

Summary
- Airport type: Public
- Owner: Greek State
- Operator: HCAA
- Location: Kythira
- Elevation AMSL: 1,045 ft (319 m)
- Coordinates: 36°16′27.33″N 23°01′01.12″E

Map
- Location of airport in Greece

Runways
Direction	Length		Surface
Direction	ft	m	Surface
02/20	4,794	1,461	Asphalt

Statistics (2018)
- Passengers: 37,031
- Passenger traffic change: ▲9.8%
- Aircraft movements: 960
- Aircraft movements change: ▲8.6%
- Sources:HCAA

Kithira Island National Airport "Alexandros Aristotelous Onassis" is an airport in Kithira, Greece (IATA: KIT, ICAO: LGKC). The airport was renovated in 1998 and the terminal and control tower were rebuilt. Olympic Air operates scheduled flights to Athens several times a week, while charter flights are common in the summer. Sky Express, a domestic Greek Airline offers three flights per week to Corfu, via Zakynthos, Kefalonia and Preveza. Travel to Kythira by airplane is considered the most reliable method of transportation to the island since it is less affected by the strong winds that prevent ferry boat transit. The airport opened in 1972.

== Airlines and destinations ==
The following airlines operate regular scheduled and charter flights at Kithira Island Airport:

Airlines	Destinations
Olympic Air	Athens
Sky Express	Athens

== See also ==
- Transport in Greece
