= Lemnos International Airport =

Airport in Greece

Lemnos International Airport "Hephaestus" Κρατικός Αερολιμένας Λήμνου «Ήφαιστος»
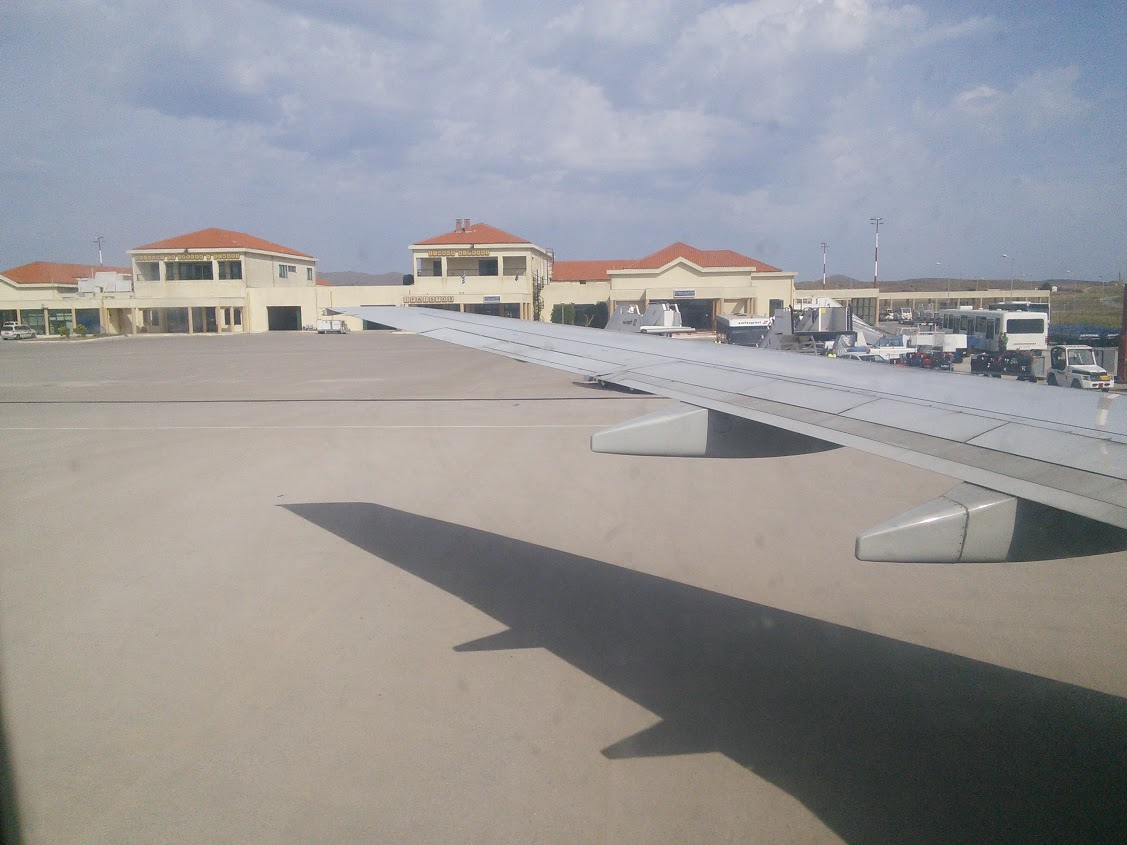
- IATA: LXS; ICAO: LGLM

Summary
- Airport type: Public / Military
- Owner: Greek state
- Operator: HCAA
- Serves: Lemnos, Greece
- Elevation AMSL: 14 ft (4.3 m)
- Coordinates: 39°55′01.46″N 025°14′10.71″E

Map
- Location of airport in Greece

Runways
Direction	Length		Surface
Direction	ft	m	Surface
04/22	9,895	3,016	Asphalt

Statistics (2018)
- Passengers: 94,227
- Passenger traffic change: ▲10.8%
- Aircraft movements: 2,458
- Aircraft movements change: ▲10.0%
- Runway Statistics

Lemnos International Airport "Hephaestus" (IATA: LXS, ICAO: LGLM) is an airport on Lemnos Island, Greece. The airport is located 18 km away from the city of Myrina and began operation in 1959. This Airport, along with the whole island of Lemnos, was also featured in the video game Arma 3. The island was named "Altis" in the video game.

The Hellenic Air Force has a base on the grounds of the airport, and has the following aircraft on display: F-4 Phantom II, A-7 Corsair II, F-5, F-104 Starfighter

== Airlines and destinations ==
The following airlines operate regular scheduled and charter flights at Lemnos Airport:

Airlines	Destinations
Aegean Airlines	Athens
Austrian Airlines	Seasonal: Vienna
Finnair	Seasonal: Helsinki
Olympic Air	Ikaria, Thessaloniki
Ryanair	Seasonal: Athens
Sky Express	Athens, Chios, Mytilene, Rhodes, Samos

== See also ==
- Transport in Greece
