= Syros Island National Airport =

Syros National Airport "Demetrius Vikelas" Κρατικός Αερολιμένας Σύρου "Δημήτριος Βικέλας"
- IATA: JSY; ICAO: LGSO

Summary
- Airport type: Public
- Operator: HCAA
- Serves: Syros Island, Greece
- Elevation AMSL: 236 ft / 72 m
- Coordinates: 37°25′22″N 024°57′03″E

Map
- Location of airport in Greece

Runways
Direction	Length		Surface
Direction	m	ft	Surface
18/36	1,080	3,542	Asphalt

Statistics (2018)
- Passengers: 18,047
- Passenger traffic change: ▼15.7%
- Aircraft movements: 700
- Aircraft movements change: ▼25.7%
- Sources:HCAA

Syros Island National Airport (Greek: Κρατικός Αερολιμένας Σύρου) (IATA: JSY, ICAO: LGSO) is an airport serving Syros Island in Greece. It is also known as Syros National Airport "Demetrius Vikelas" (Greek: Κρατικός Αερολιμένας Σύρου "Δημήτριος Βικέλας"), named for Demetrius Vikelas (1835–1908), a Greek businessman and writer born in Ermoupoli on the island of Syros. The airport was opened in 1991. Syros is part of the Cyclades island group in the Aegean Sea, located 78 nautical miles (144 km) southeast of Athens.

== Facilities ==
The airport is at an elevation of 236 feet (72 m) above mean sea level. It has one runway designated 18/36 with an asphalt surface measuring 1,080 by 30 metres (3,543 ft × 98 ft).

== Airlines and destinations ==
The following airlines operate regular scheduled and charter flights at Syros Island Airport:

Airlines	Destinations
Aegean Airlines	Seasonal: Heraklion, Thessaloniki
Sky Express	Athens

== See also ==
- Transport in Greece
