= Kastoria National Airport =

Kastoria National Airport Aristotelis Airport
- IATA: KSO; ICAO: LGKA

Summary
- Airport type: Public
- Owner: Greek State
- Operator: HCAA
- Location: Kastoria, Macedonia, Greece
- Elevation AMSL: 2,167 ft (661 m)
- Coordinates: 40°26′46.66″N 021°16′55.87″E

Map
- Location of airport in Greece

Runways
Direction	Length		Surface
Direction	ft	m	Surface
12/30	8,852	2,698	Asphalt

Statistics (2018)
- Passengers: 4,301
- Passenger traffic change: ▼13.3%
- Aircraft movements: 338
- Aircraft movements change: ▲7.6%
- Sources:HCAA, World Aero Data

Kastoria National Airport (also known as Aristotelis Airport) (IATA: KSO, ICAO: LGKA) is an airport in Argos Orestiko at the regional unit of Kastoria, Macedonia, Greece.

== Airlines and destinations ==
The following airlines operate regular scheduled and charter flights at Kastoria National Airport:

Airlines	Destinations
Sky Express	Athens, Kozani

== See also ==
- Transport in Greece
