= Skyros Island National Airport =

Skyros Island National Airport Κρατικός Αερολιμένας Σκύρου
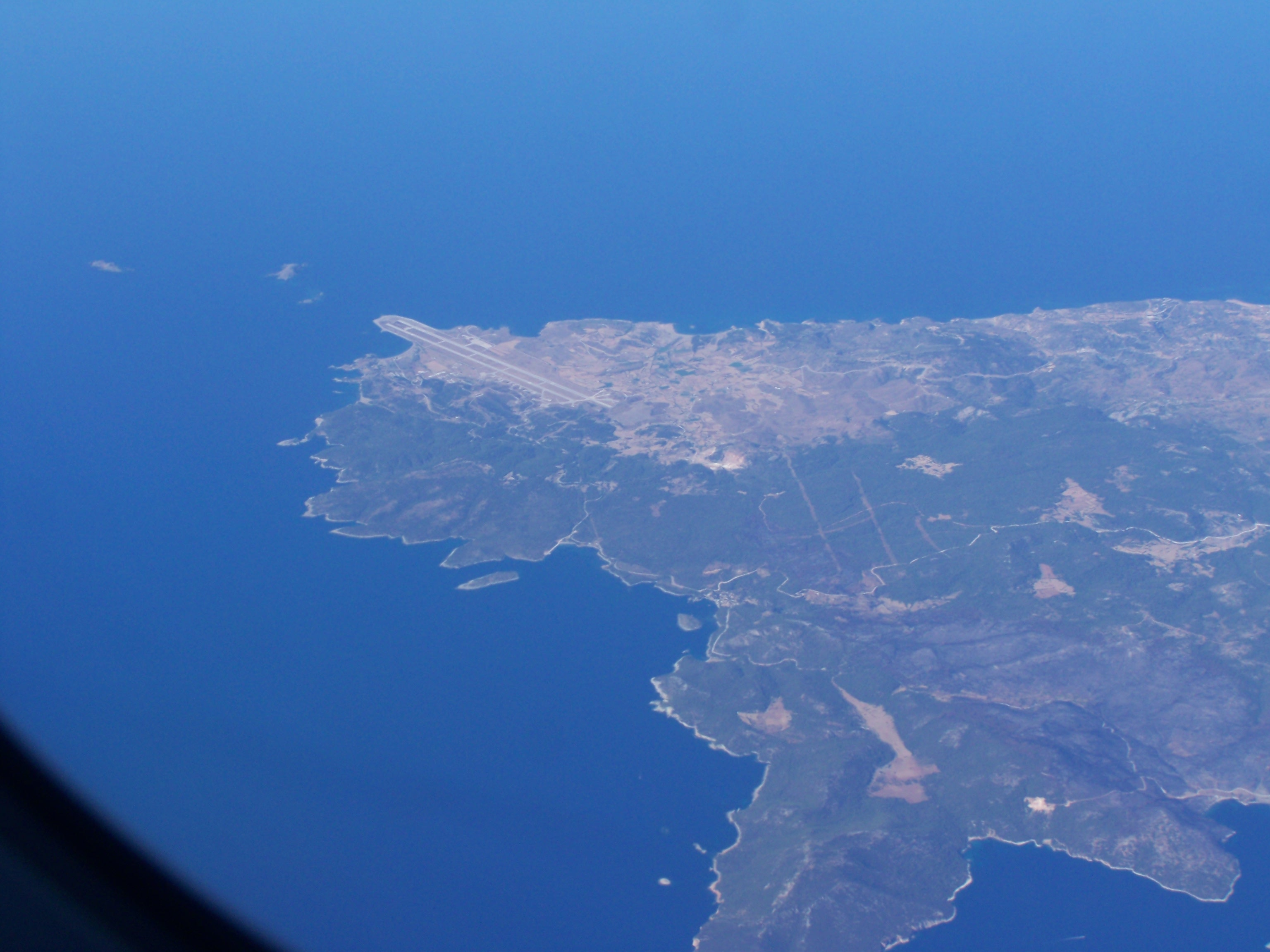
- IATA: SKU; ICAO: LGSY

Summary
- Airport type: Public / military
- Operator: HCAA
- Location: Skyros, Greece
- Elevation AMSL: 44 ft (13 m)
- Coordinates: 38°58′03″N 024°29′14″E

Map
- Location of airport in Greece

Runways
Direction	Length		Surface
Direction	ft	m	Surface
17/35	9,849	3,002	Asphalt

Statistics (2018)
- Passengers: 18,103
- Passenger traffic change: ▲5.6%
- Aircraft movements: 680
- Aircraft movements change: ▼0.1%
- Sources:HCAA

Skyros Island National Airport (Greek: Κρατικός Αερολιμένας Σκύρου) (IATA: SKU, ICAO: LGSY) is an airport serving the island of Skyros in Greece. It is located 17 km northwards from the town of the island (also called Skyros), in an area called Trachi. It opened in 1984 and has operated since then as a civil airport.

== Airlines and destinations ==
The following airlines operate regular scheduled and charter flights at Skyros Island Airport:

Airlines	Destinations
Olympic Air	Athens
Sky Express	Thessaloniki
Smartwings	Seasonal Charter: Prague
Austrian Airlines	Seasonal Charter: Vienna

== Skyros Air Base ==
The airport is home to the 22nd Guided Missile Squadron attached to 350th Guided Missile Wing of the Hellenic Air Force, and operates MIM-104 Patriot PAC-3 batteries.

== See also ==
- Transport in Greece
