= Kozani National Airport =

Kozani National Airport Filippos
- IATA: KZI; ICAO: LGKZ

Summary
- Airport type: Public
- Operator: HCAA
- Location: Kozani
- Elevation AMSL: 2,059 ft (628 m)
- Coordinates: 40°17′10″N 21°50′27″E

Map
- Location of airport in Greece

Runways
Direction	Length		Surface
Direction	ft	m	Surface
14/32	5,978	1,822	Asphalt

Statistics (2018)
- Passengers: 4,345
- Passenger traffic change: ▲15.9%
- Aircraft movements: 330
- Aircraft movements change: ▼12.7%
- Sources:HCAA

Kozani National Airport "Filippos" (Greek: Κρατικός Αερολιμένας Κοζάνης "Φίλιππος") (IATA: KZI, ICAO: LGKZ) is located 4 km (2.5 mi) southeast of the Greek city of Kozani. It started operations in the 1950s. Kozanis' and Kastorias' airports are the only two public airports in the region of Western Macedonia, Greece.

== Airlines and destinations ==
The following airlines operate regular scheduled and charter flights at Kozani National Airport:

Airlines	Destinations
Sky Express	Athens, Kastoria

== See also ==
- Transport in Greece
