= Naxos Island National Airport =

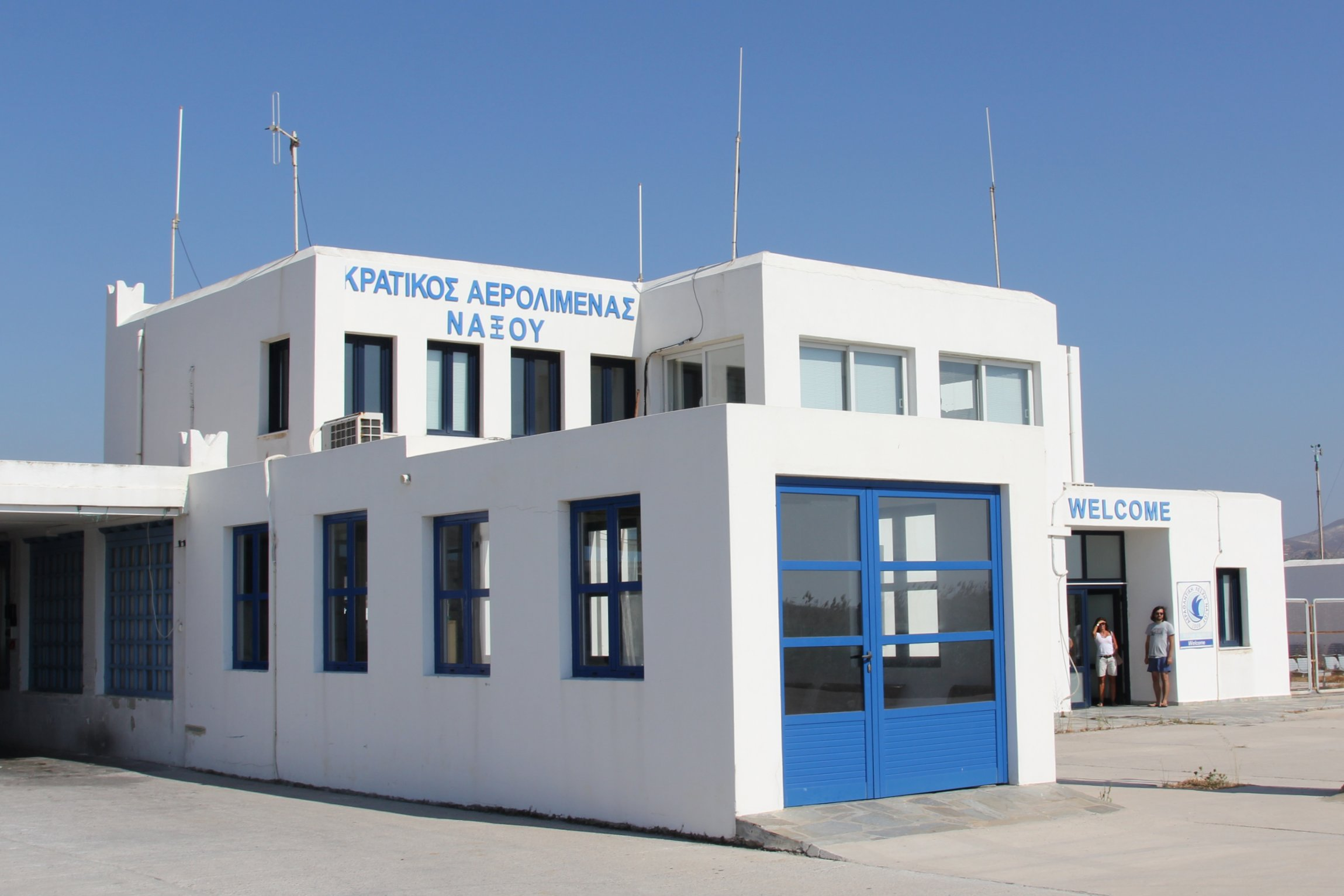
- IATA: JNX; ICAO: LGNX

Summary
- Airport type: Public
- Location: Naxos
- Elevation AMSL: 10 ft (3.0 m)
- Coordinates: 37°04′52″N 25°22′05″E

Map
- Location of airport in Greece

Runways
Direction	Length		Surface
Direction	ft	m	Surface
18/36	2,957	901	Asphalt

Statistics (2018)
- Passengers: 86,210
- Passenger traffic change: ▲52.2%
- Aircraft movements: 2,420
- Aircraft movements change: ▲37.8%

Naxos Island National Airport is an airport in Naxos, Greece (IATA: JNX, ICAO: LGNX). It is located near Agios Prokopios, 3 km from Naxos City. The airport opened in 1992.

== Airlines and destinations ==
The following airlines operate regular scheduled and charter flights at Naxos Island Airport:

Airlines	Destinations
Aegean Airlines	Seasonal: Heraklion, Thessaloniki
Olympic Air	Athens
Sky Express	Athens

== Expansion plan 2023-2025 ==
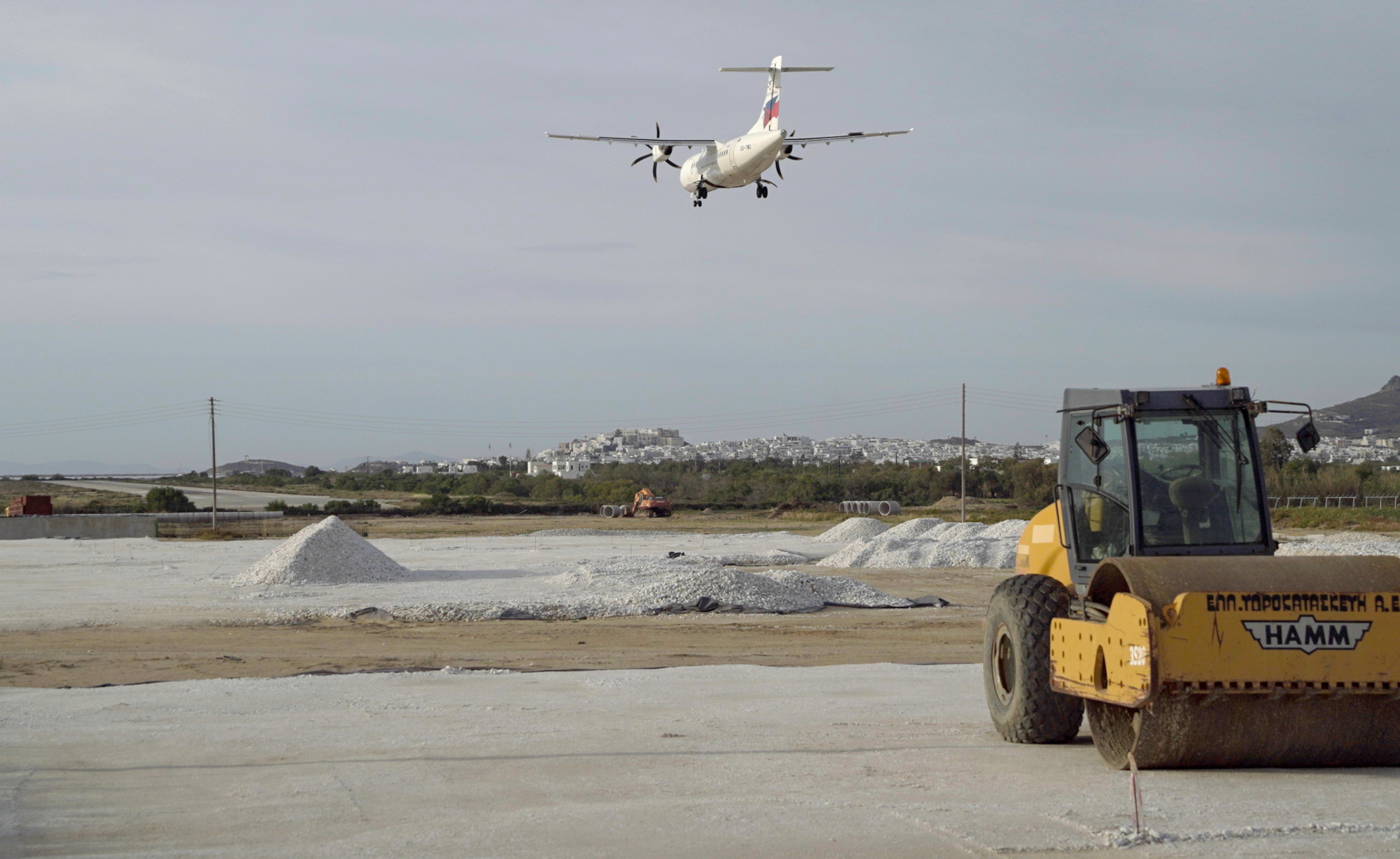
Construction progress May 2024

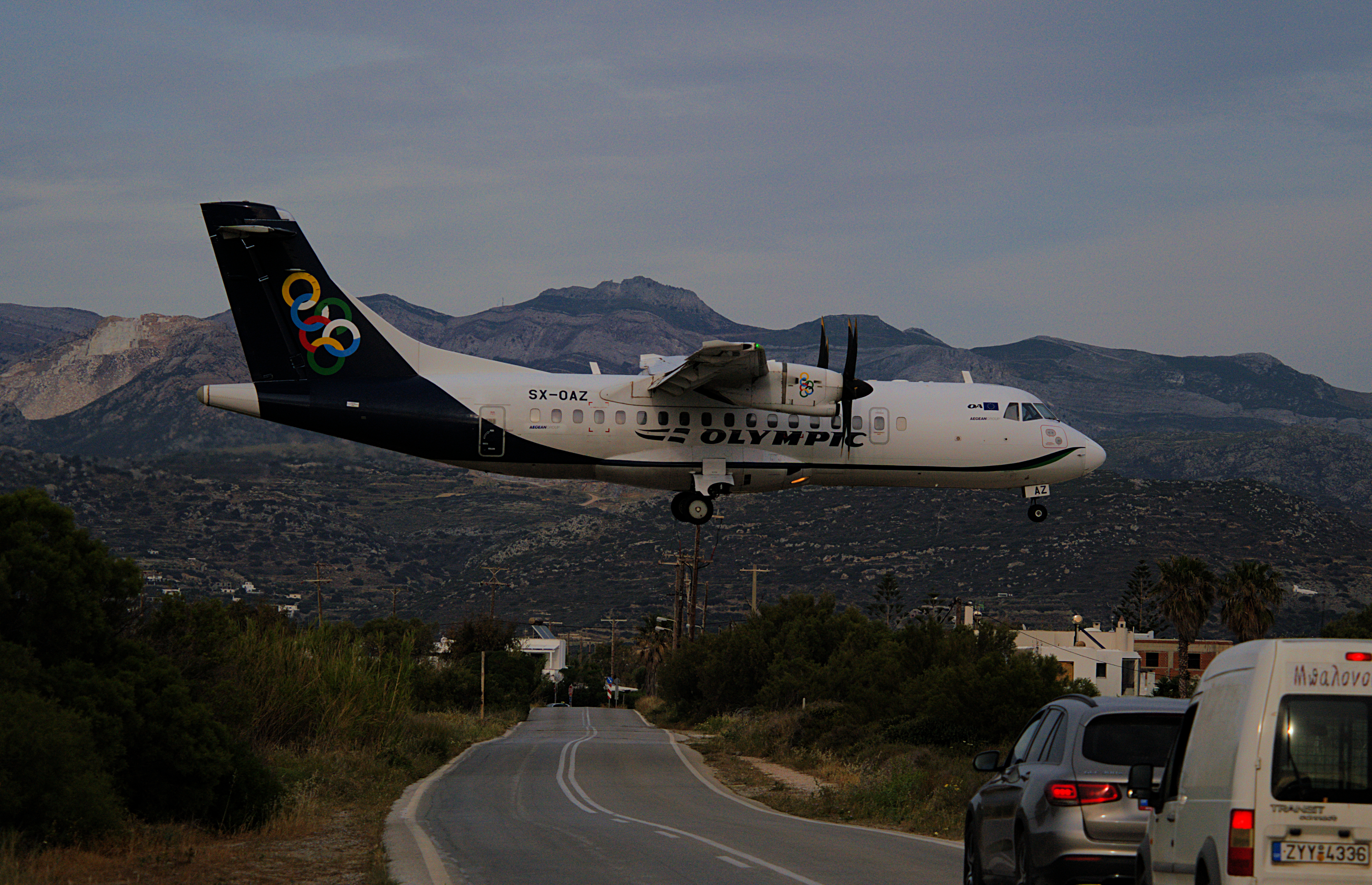
Arriving ATR 42-600 to RWY18

A €17 million expansion programme is under way at the airport, with construction approximately halfway complete. The project is intended to improve flight safety, particularly during the peak summer operating period. The airport’s 900 m runway limits the operation of Sky Express’s ATR 72-600 aircraft, which cannot take off at full load from the existing runway.

The expansion plan includes following:

- 300m runway expansion to the south
- formation of lateral safety zones on both sides of the extended runway
- construction of extreme safety zone of 60m at the end of the extended ruwnay
- formation of a RESA of 90m after the new southern safety zone
- widening of the existing taxiway from 15m to 18m with support walls on either side
- construction of new connecting taxiways
- turnpad on the end of the extended runway
- expansion of aircraft parking area by 6000m²
- modernization of existing airfield
- construction of hydraulic works for drainage and disposal of water
- construction of internal perimeter road
- fencing of the expropriated area
- replacement of portable type lighting systems and new permanent ones
- renovation of existing lighting control system

== Accidents and incidents ==
- On 12 December 2009, an Olympic Air ATR 42 (registration SX-BPA), performing flight OA6 from Athens to Naxos, was on a visual approach to runway 36 and had been handed off to Naxos Tower by air traffic control. The airplane was then seen in full landing configuration on final approach to Paros' runway 35 (length 710 meters/2300 feet) on the adjacent island. Paros Tower made contact on its frequency and Naxos Tower and ordered the aircraft to go around. The crew aborted the approach and subsequently landed safely in Naxos.
- On 12 July 2019, a Sky Express ATR 42 (registration SX-FOR), about to perform flight GQ-405 from Naxos to Athens, was backtracking the runway for departure, when the aircraft went off the paved surface of the runway and came to a stop with the main gear in a ditch and the lower fuselage on the runway edge. There were no injuries, but the airport was closed for the rest of the day as a precautionary measure.

== See also ==
- Transport in Greece
