= Astypalaia Island National Airport =

Airport on Astypalaia island, Greece

- IATA: JTY; ICAO: LGPL

Summary
- Airport type: Public
- Owner: Greek government
- Operator: HCAA
- Serves: Astypalaia
- Location: Analipsis, Astypalaia island
- Elevation AMSL: 165 ft (50 m)
- Coordinates: 36°34′47.59″N 26°22′32.96″E

Map
- Location of airport in Greece

Runways
| Direction | Length | | Surface |
| Direction | ft | m | Surface |
|---|---|---|---|
| 15/33 | 3,245 | 989 | Asphalt |

Statistics (2018)
- Passengers: 14,029
- Passenger traffic change: ▲12.3%
- Aircraft movements: 617
- Aircraft movements change: ▼8.9%
- Runway Statistics

Astypalaia Island National Airport (IATA: JTY, ICAO: LGPL), also known as "Panaghia" Airport, is an airport on Astypalaia Island, Dodecanese, Greece. The facility is located nearby the village Analipsis, and approximately 12 km northeast of the city of Astypalaia.

== Airlines and destinations ==
The following airlines operate regular scheduled and charter flights at Astypalaia Island National Airport:

| Airlines | Destinations |
|---|---|
| Sky Express | Athens, Kalymnos, Kos, Leros |

== Statistics ==
History of the annual throughput of passengers:

| Year | Flights | Passengers | Passengers change |
|---|---|---|---|
| 2001 | 432 | 9,316 | ▼7.4% |
| 2002 | 528 | 10,431 | ▲12.0% |
| 2003 | 665 | 11,331 | ▲8.6% |
| 2004 | 694 | 12,580 | ▲11.0% |
| 2005 | 668 | 13,302 | ▲5.7% |
| 2006 | 1,072 | 15,923 | ▲19.7% |
| 2007 | 976 | 14,806 | ▼7.0% |
| 2008 | 700 | 15,137 | ▲2.2% |
| 2009 | 692 | 14,704 | ▼2.9% |
| 2010 | 740 | 13,609 | ▼7.4% |
| 2011 | 743 | 13,349 | ▼1.9% |
| 2012 | 810 | 12,561 | ▼5.9% |
| 2013 | 802 | 11,940 | ▼4.9% |
| 2014 | 800 | 13,771 | ▲15.3% |
| 2015 | 786 | 14,095 | ▲2.4% |
| 2016 | 760 | 12,014 | ▼14.8% |
| 2017 | 689 | 12,489 | ▲3.9% |
| 2018 | 617 | 14,029 | ▲12.3% |

== See also ==
- Transport in Greece
