= Chios Island National Airport =

Chios International Airport "Omiros" Κρατικός Αερολιμένας Χίου «Όμηρος»
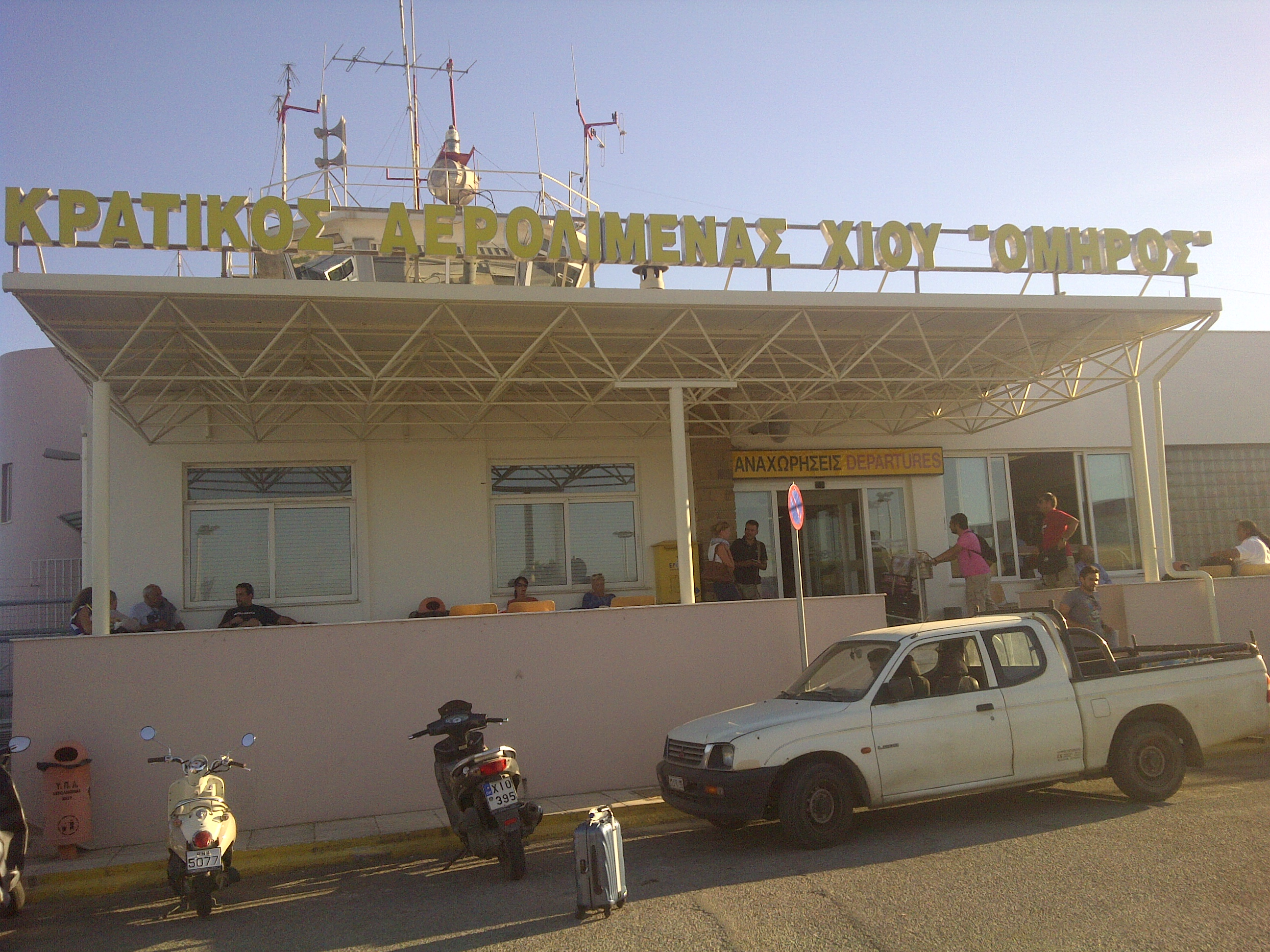
- IATA: JKH; ICAO: LGHI

Summary
- Airport type: Public
- Operator: HCAA
- Serves: Chios, Greece
- Location: Chios, Greece
- Elevation AMSL: 15 ft (4.6 m)
- Coordinates: 38°20′35″N 026°08′26″E

Map
- Location of airport in Greece

Runways
Direction	Length		Surface
Direction	m	ft	Surface
01/19	1,511	4,957	Asphalt

Statistics (2018)
- Passengers: 229,749
- Passenger traffic change: ▲6.6%
- Aircraft movements: 5,492
- Aircraft movements change: ▲9.8%
- Sources:HCAA, DAFIF

Chios Island National Airport (Greek: Κρατικός Αερολιμένας Χίου) (IATA: JKH, ICAO: LGHI) is an airport on the island of Chios in Greece. It is also known as Chios National Airport, "Omiros" or Chios Airport located at the region of Kampos, south of the city of Chios. Aircraft up to the size of Airbus A320 are able to land at the airport.

== History ==
The government-owned airport in Chios is found in the coastal area of the eastern department of the island. Its operations began on 4 August 1969 with Olympic Airways Flight OA560 from Athens. The runway was built with a length of 1,511 x 30 meters, and has not been extended since its construction.

== Airlines and destinations ==
The following airlines operate regular scheduled and charter flights at Chios Island Airport:

Airlines	Destinations
Aegean Airlines	Athens
Olympic Air	Thessaloniki
Sky Express	Athens, Lemnos, Mytilene, Rhodes, Samos, Thessaloniki

== See also ==
- Transport in Greece
