= Mytilene International Airport =

Airport in Lesbos, Greece

Mytilene International Airport Odysseas Elytis

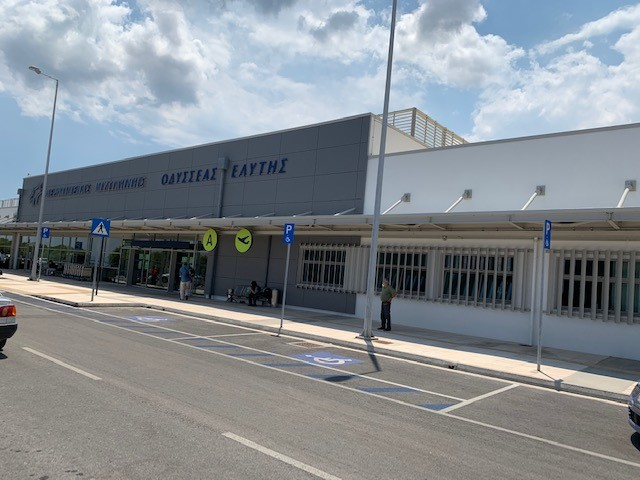
- IATA: MJT; ICAO: LGMT; WMO: 16667

Summary
- Airport type: Public
- Owner: Greek government
- Operator: Fraport AG/Copelouzos Group joint venture
- Serves: Lesbos
- Location: Mytilene, Greece
- Elevation AMSL: 60 ft (18 m)
- Coordinates: 39°03′24″N 026°35′54″E
- Website: mjt-airport.gr

Map
- Location of airport in Greece

Runways
Direction	Length		Surface
Direction	ft	m	Surface
14/32	7,894	2,406	Asphalt

Statistics (2023)
- Passengers: 497.499
- Passenger traffic change: ▲13,3%
- Aircraft movements: 6.412
- Aircraft movements change: ▲3,7%
- Sources: Fraport Greece

Mytilene International Airport "Odysseas Elytis" (IATA: MJT, ICAO: LGMT) is the international airport of Mytilene, the capital of the Greek island Lesbos.

== History ==
The airport began to operate in 1948 however it was 1980 before the first charter flight landed.

In December 2015, the privatisation of Mytilene International Airport and 13 other regional airports of Greece was finalised with the signing of the agreement between the Fraport AG/Copelouzos Group joint venture and the state privatisation fund. "We signed the deal today," the head of Greece's privatisation agency HRADF, Stergios Pitsiorlas, told Reuters. According to the agreement, the joint venture will operate the 14 airports (including Mytilene International Airport) for 40 years as of 11 April 2017.

== Facilities ==
The airport has one small terminal that services both International and Domestic flights. The airport is 8 kilometres from Mytilene. It was established in 1948 with an unpaved runway of 1200 meters long and 30 meters wide. Over the years the runway was paved and in 2000 the latest runway extension to 2400 meters was made. The airport has a duty-free shop, café-bar and two car rental agencies.

On the northern side of the south apron Mytilene Airclub is located.

== Fraport Greece's investment plan ==
On 22 March 2017, Fraport Greece presented its master plan for the 14 regional airports including the International Airport of Mytilene.

Immediate actions that will be implemented at the airports as soon as Fraport Greece takes over operations before the launch of the summer season include:

- General clean-up
- Improving lighting, marking of airside areas
- Upgrading sanitary facilities (but you have no drinking water in the lavatories)
- Enhancing services and offering a new free Internet connection (WiFi)
- Implementing works to improve fire safety in all the areas of the airports

The following summarizes the enhancement changes that will be started in October 2017 and will be implemented for Mytilene International Airport under Fraport Greece's investment plan until 2021:

- New terminal
- New fire station
- New waste water treatment plant
- New airport apron area
- 185 percent increase in the total size of the airport at 7,185 m2
- 29 percent increase in the number of check-in counters (from 7 to 9)

== Airlines and destinations ==
The following airlines operate regular scheduled and charter flights at Mytilene Airport:

Airlines	Destinations
Aegean Airlines	Athens, Thessaloniki; Seasonal: Heraklion
Austrian Airlines	Seasonal: Vienna
Brussels Airlines	Seasonal: Brussels
Corendon Dutch Airlines	Seasonal: Amsterdam
Cyprus Airlines	Tel Aviv
Enter Air	Katowice, London Gatwick, Warsaw
FLYYO	Seasonal charter: Tel Aviv
Jet2.com	Seasonal: Birmingham, London–Gatwick (begins 2 May 2027), London–Stansted, Manchester
SAS	Copenhagen, Oslo, Stockholm
Sky Express	Athens, Chios, Lemnos, Rhodes, Samos, Thessaloniki; Seasonal: Heraklion
Smartwings	Seasonal charter: Katowice, Prague
Sunclass Airlines	Seasonal charter: Copenhagen
TAROM	Bucharest, Cluj
Trade Air	Ljubljana
Transavia	Seasonal: Amsterdam
TUI	Samos
TUI fly Belgium	Seasonal: Brussels
TUI fly Netherlands	Seasonal: Amsterdam

== Statistics ==
The data are from the official website of the airport:

Year	Passengers		
Year	Domestic	International	Total
2017	332,370	103,626	435,996
2018	▲344,257	▲132,799	▲477,056
2019	▲362,759	▲133,818	▲496,577
2020	▼191.230	▼14.865	▼206.095
2021	▲238,818	▲46,526	▲285,344
2022	▲329,719	▲109,466	▲439,185
2023	▲375,716	▲121,783	▲497,499
2024	▲385,938	▲177,605	▲563,543
2025	▲405,890	▲181,954	▲587,844

=== Traffic statistics by country (2024) ===
Traffic by country at Mytilene International Airport – 2024
Place	Country	Total passengers
1	Greece	385,938
2	Netherlands	45,691
3	United Kingdom	40,109
4	Denmark	28,296
5	Belgium	17,537
6	Poland	11,893
7	Israel	7,731
8	Sweden	6,827
9	Norway	6,815
10	Czech Republic	5,621

== See also ==
- Transport in Greece
