= Hellenic Civil Aviation Authority =

Hellenic Civil Aviation Authority Υπηρεσία Πολιτικής Αεροπορίας
- Abbreviation: HCAA - ΥΠΑ
- Formation: 1931/1952
- Type: Civil Service department
- Purpose: Regulation of civil aviation
- Headquarters: Glyfada, Greece
- Coordinates: 37°52′41.2″N 23°44′02″E
- Region served: Greece
- Governor: Georgios Saounatsos
- Parent organization: Ministry of Infrastructure, Transport and Networks
- Staff: 2.671
- Website: www.hcaa.gr

The Hellenic Civil Aviation Authority (Greek: Υπηρεσία Πολιτικής Αεροπορίας), abbreviated HCAA (Greek: ΥΠΑ), is a department of the Greek government under the Ministry of Infrastructure, Transport and Networks. It is involved in air traffic control, aeronautical communications, airport operations, aircraft registration and inspection, licensing of civil air operators, and personnel certification.

The headquarters of the HCAA are located at Glyfada, near the old Ellinikon Airport. And the current Governor is Georgios Saounatsos.

== List of Governors ==
Since its creation in 1931/1952, these people have served as Governor of the Hellenic Civil Aviation Authority:

== HCAA communications facilities ==
The Hellenic CAA uses a number of remotely operated VHF radio stations for civil aviation communications at the following locations:

- Ymittos (near Athens)
- Akarnanika Mountains
- Thassos Island
- Spergioli
- Moustakos
- Monastiri
- Sitia
- Geraneia Mountains

== Air Traffic Control radar ==
The HCAA uses a number of radar stations:

- Ymittos (near Athens), primary
- Mount Pilion (SSR)
- Levkas Island (SSR)
- Kythira (SSR)
- Crete (SSR)
- Athens International Airport, Kamara and Merenta hills (approach)
- Hellenikon (approach)
- Thessaloniki/Peraia (approach)
- Heraklion (approach)
- Rhodes (approach)
- Corfu (approach)

The radar stations are integrated using the PALLAS system (Phased Automation of the heLLenic ATC radar System).

== HCAA Flying Unit ==
The agency operates a small fleet of aircraft for navigational aid calibration activities. The current fleet is the following:

Registration	Type	S/N	Introduction	Function	Photograph
SX-ECG	Beech 200 Super King Air	BB-372	1979	Navaid calibration	
SX-ECI	Cessna 750 Citation X	750-0262	2008	Navaid calibration	
SX-HET	Bolkow Bo-105	S-864	2009	General support	
