= List of accidents and incidents involving the DC-3 in 1969 =

This is a list of accidents and incidents involving the Douglas DC-3^{A} that occurred in 1969, including aircraft based on the DC-3 airframe such as the Douglas C-47 Skytrain and Lisunov Li-2. Military accidents are included; and hijackings and incidents of terrorism are covered, although acts of war involving military aircraft are outside the scope of this list.

== January ==
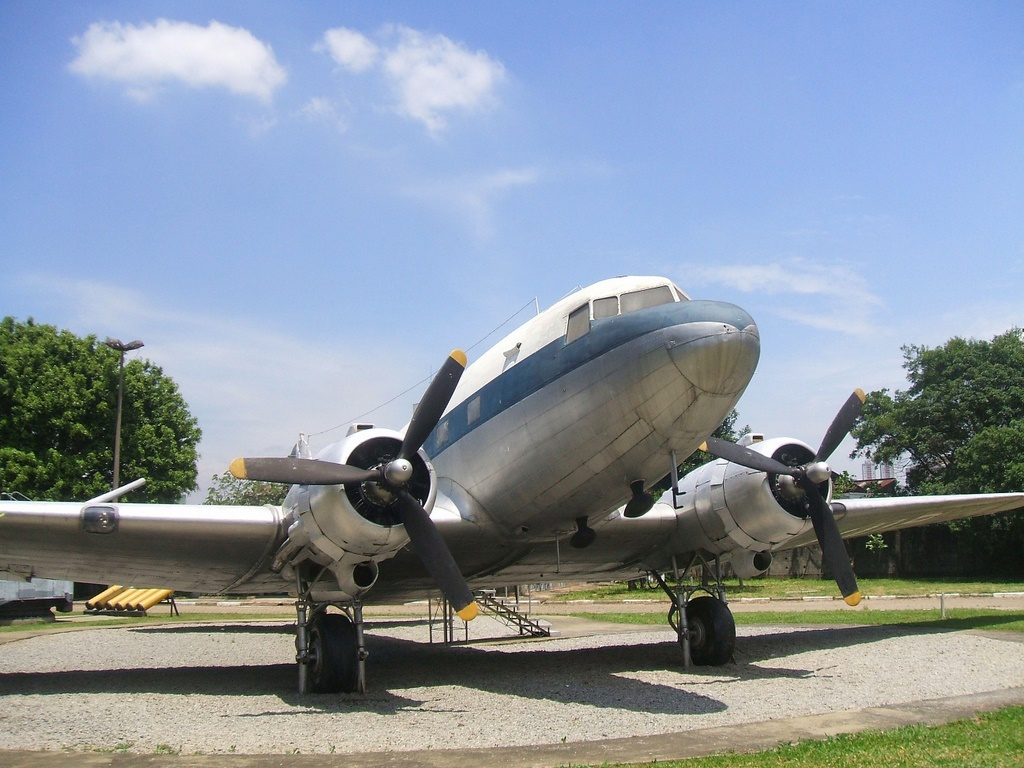
A C-47 of VASP

- 2 January: Douglas DC-3A B-309 of China Airlines(CI227) crashed into Mount Paku, Taiwan. The aircraft was operating a domestic scheduled passenger flight from Taitung Airport to Kaohsiung International Airport. All 24 passengers and crew were killed.
- 11 January: Douglas C-47A PP-SPR of VASP was damaged beyond economic repair at Loanda, Paraná.
- 15 January: Douglas C-47 YA-AAB of Ariana Afghan Airlines was damaged beyond economic repair in a ground collision with Douglas DC-6 YA-DAN of Ariana at Kabul International Airport.
- 16 January: Douglas C-47A 949 of Air America crashed in the Hai Van Pass, 18 miles (29 km) south of Huế. The aircraft was on a domestic cargo flight from Phu Bai International Airport to Da Nang International Airport. All 12 passengers and crew were killed.
- 17 January: Douglas C-47A VT-DTH of Hindu Publications crashed on take-off from Chelari Airport. The aircraft was operating a cargo flight. Both crew were killed.

== February ==
- 12 February: Douglas C-47B 14+05 of the German Air Force (Luftwaffe) was written off in an accident at Husum. Three of the four people on board were killed.
- 15 February: Douglas C-47B B-241 of Far Eastern Air Transport was damaged beyond economic repair in an accident at Kaohsiung International Airport.
- 18 February: Douglas DC-3 VT-CJH of Indian Airlines crashed on take-off from Jaipur - Sanganer Airport on a scheduled passenger flight. The aircraft was overloaded and take-off was either downwind or with a crosswind. All 30 people on board survived.
- 18 February: Douglas C-49J N15570, operating Hawthorne Nevada Airlines Flight 708 crashed into Mount Whitney killing all 35 people on board. The aircraft was operating a domestic scheduled passenger flight from Hawthorne Industrial Airport, Nevada to Hollywood-Burbank Airport, California.
- 21 February: Douglas C-47 IJ820 of the Indian Air Force was written off in an accident.

== March ==
- 8 March: Douglas C-47A N64134 of Zamrud Airlines ditched 200 nautical miles (370 km) off Hilo, Hawaii after a double engine failure whilst on a ferry flight.
- 19 March: Douglas C-47 4W-AAS of Yemen Airlines crashed shortly after take-off from Ta'izz Airport due to an incorrectly assembled elevator trim tab that operated in the opposite manner to normal. The aircraft was operating a test flight, all four crew were killed.
- 20 March: Douglas DC-3 N142D, leased from Avion Airways for a private charter, crashed on landing at New Orleans International Airport, Louisiana killing 16 of the 27 passengers and crew on board. The aircraft was operating a domestic non-scheduled passenger flight from Memphis International Airport, Tennessee.
- 28 March: Douglas C-47A OO-SBH of Belgian International Air Services was written off in a wheels-up landing in the Libyan desert.

== April ==
- 10 April: Douglas C-47A ET-AAQ of Ethiopian Airlines was shot down 3 nautical miles (5.6 km) south of Suez. The aircraft was operating an international cargo flight from Asmara International Airport, Eritrea to Cairo International Airport, Egypt.
- 14 April: Douglas C-53D PP-CBZ of Cruzeiro do Sul crashed at Tapuruquara Airport, Santa Isabel do Rio Negro.
- 14 April: Douglas C-47B BJ913 of the Indian Air Force was damaged beyond repair in an accident.
- 15 April: Douglas DC-3D N4296 of Aviation Enterprises was destroyed by fire at Baginton Airport, Coventry.
- 23 April: Douglas DC-3A PI-C947 of Filipinas Orient Airways was damaged beyond economic repair in a landing accident at Roxas City Airport. All 31 passengers and crew survived.
- 24 April: Douglas C-47A B-251 of Far Eastern Air Transport (FEAT) was damaged beyond economic repair in an accident while landing at Phan Thiết. All 31 passengers and crew survived.
- 24 April: Douglas C-47A 9G-AAF of Ghana Airways crashed on approach to Takoradi Airport, killing one passenger of the 33 passengers and crew. The aircraft was operating a domestic scheduled passenger flight from Kotoka Airport, Accra.

== May ==
- 5 May: Douglas R4D-1 LQ-IPC of the Administración Nacional de Aviación Civil (ANAC) crashed on landing at Las Higueras Airport, killing all 11 people on board.
- 5 May: Douglas C-47A TC-28 of the Fuerza Aérea Argentina was written off in a crash at Río Cuarto, killing all 11 people on board.
- 18 May: Douglas DC-3 HI-159 of LANSA was written off in the Dominican Republic.
- 23 May: Douglas DC-3 XY-ACR of Union of Burma Airways crashed on approach to Lashio Airport killing all six people on board. The aircraft was operating a domestic non-scheduled passenger flight.

== June ==
- 4 June: A Douglas DC-3 of the Direcção de Exploração dos Transportes Aéreos was hijacked on a domestic flight from N'zeto Airport to Soyo Airport, Angola. The aircraft landed at Pointe Noire Airport.
- 7 June: Douglas EC-47 43-49547 of the United States Air Force crashed shortly after take-off from Ubon Royal Thai Air Force Base following loss of power from at least one engine. The aircraft crashed in the Mun River, all on board survived.
- 20 June: A Douglas DC-3 of Líneas Aéreas La Urraca was hijacked on a domestic flight from La Vanguardia Airport, Villavicencio to Monterrey Airport, Colombia. The aircraft landed in Cuba.

== July ==
- 3 July: A Douglas DC-3 of SAETA was hijacked on a domestic flight from Tulcán Airport to Mariscal Sucre International Airport, Quito. The hijackers demanded to be taken to Cuba.
- 10 July: A privately operated Douglas DC-3 N139D crashed on take-off from Malcolm Island Airport, Saskatchewan due to the failure to remove control locks before flight was attempted. All 25 people on board survived. The aircraft was operating an international non-scheduled passenger flight to Duluth International Airport, Minnesota, United States.
- 12 July: Douglas DC-3D 9N-AAP of Royal Nepal Airlines crashed at Hitauda after colliding with a tree on a 7,300 feet (2,200 m) elevation ridge whilst flying in cloud. All 35 people on board were killed. The aircraft was operating a domestic scheduled passenger flight from Tribhuvan International Airport, Kathmandu to Simra Airport.
- 23 July: Douglas C-47 F-OCKT of Air Djibouti ditched 9 nautical miles (17 km) off the Djibouti coast after striking a number of cranes whilst flying at an altitude of 300 feet (91 m). The aircraft was operating a domestic flight from Tadjoura Airport to Djibouti Airport. All four people on board survived.
- July: Douglas R4D-6 150187 of the United States Navy was damaged beyond economic repair in an accident at Thórshöfn Airport.

== August ==
- 4 August: A Douglas C-47 BuNo 17254 (c/n 25629) of U.S. Navy is lost in-flight from Santiago de Chile to Buenos Aires.
- 11 August: A Douglas DC-3 of Ethiopian Airlines was hijacked on a domestic flight from Bahir Dar Airport to Addis Ababa Airport.
- 16 August: A Douglas DC-3 of Olympic Airways was hijacked on a domestic flight from Ellinikon International Airport, Athens to Agrinion Airport. The aircraft, possibly registered SX-BBF, landed at Valona.
- 25 August: Douglas C-47B HC-ALK of Transportes Aéreos Orientales crashed at Suere, killing one person.

== September ==
- 6 September: two Douglas DC-3s of TAME were hijacked on flights that originated at Mariscal Sucre International Airport, Quito. Both aircraft were flown to Tumaco Airport, Colombia where one aircraft was abandoned. The other was refuelled and flown to Tocumen International Airport, Panama City, Panama where another refuelling stop was made. After flying to Norman Manley International Airport, Kingston, Jamaica where it was refuelled again, the aircraft landed at Antonio Maceo Airport, Santiago de Cuba. A crewmember of one aircraft was killed and another was wounded.
- 8 September: Douglas C-47 FAC-685 of SATENA crashed near Apiay Air Force Base killing all 32 people on board. The aircraft was operating a domestic scheduled passenger flight from Monterrey Airport to Apiay.
- 13 September: A Douglas C-47 of SAHSA was hijacked on a domestic scheduled passenger flight from Golosón International Airport, La Ceiba, to Toncontín International Airport, Tegucigalpa, Honduras. The aircraft landed at Comalapa International Airport, San Salvador.
- 14 September: Douglas C-47B PP-SPP of VASP crashed whilst attempting a single-engine go-around at Londrina Airport, killing all 20 people on board. The aircraft was operating a domestic scheduled passenger flight from Londrina, but had returned following the failure of the port engine.
- On 30 September: Douglas EC-47 43-48959 of the United States Air Force was destroyed by fire in an accident at Phu Bai Air Base, Huế.

== October ==
- 8 October: Douglas EC-47 43-49100 of the United States Air Force crashed 30 nautical miles (56 km) south east of Phu Cat Air Base, killing six people.

== November ==
- 9 November: Douglas C-47B CF-AAL of Austin Airways crashed on approach to Timmins Airport, Ontario killing two of the four people on board. The aircraft was operating a domestic flight from Winisk, Ontario.
- 25 November: Douglas C-47A HR-ANA of SAHSA crashed on landing at Toncontin Airport, Tegucigalpa. All 18 people on board survived.

== December ==
- 5 December: Douglas C-47A CC-CBY of LAN Chile crashed on take-off from El Tepual Airport, Puerto Montt. The aircraft was operating a cargo flight, all three people on board survived.
- 23 December: Douglas C-47A XW-TDJ of Laos Air crashed into a mountain near Luang Prabang whilst operating a scheduled passenger flight, killing six of the 19 people on board.

== Unknown date ==
- Douglas C-47A CF-UZA of Keir Air Transport was reported to have been damaged beyond economic repair at an unknown location.
- Douglas R4D-6 102 of the Fuerza Aérea Salvadoreña was reported to have been damaged beyond economic repair at an unknown location.

== See also ==
- List of accidents and incidents involving the DC-3 in the 1960s

== Notes ==
^Note A Military versions of the DC-3 were known as C-47 Skytrain, C-48, C-49, C-50, C-51, C-52, C-53 Skytrooper, C-68, C-84, C-117 Super Dakota and YC-129 by the United States Army Air Forces and as the R4D by the United States Navy. In Royal Air Force (and other British Commonwealth air forces') service, these aircraft were known as Dakotas.
