= Flight 954 =

Flight 954 may refer to

- Olympic Airways Flight 954, crashed on 8 December 1969
- Delta Air Lines Flight 954, runway collision on 20 December 1972
