= Flight 417 =

Flight 417 may refer to:

- Los Angeles Airways Flight 417, crashed on 14 August 1968
- Olympic Airways Flight 417, caused a death by smoke inhalation on 4 January 1998
