= Olympic Aviation =

Greek airline

IATA	ICAO	Call sign
ML	OLY	OLAVIA
- Founded: 1971
- Ceased operations: 2003
- Hubs: Eleftherios Venizelos International Airport, Ellinikon International Airport
- Focus cities: Makedonia International Airport
- Frequent-flyer program: Icarus Frequent Flyer Program
- Fleet size: 32 (at December 2003)
- Destinations: served the Olympic Airways network
- Parent company: Olympic Airways Services S.A. (formerly Olympic Airways S.A.)
- Headquarters: Athens, Greece
- Website: Olympic Aviation

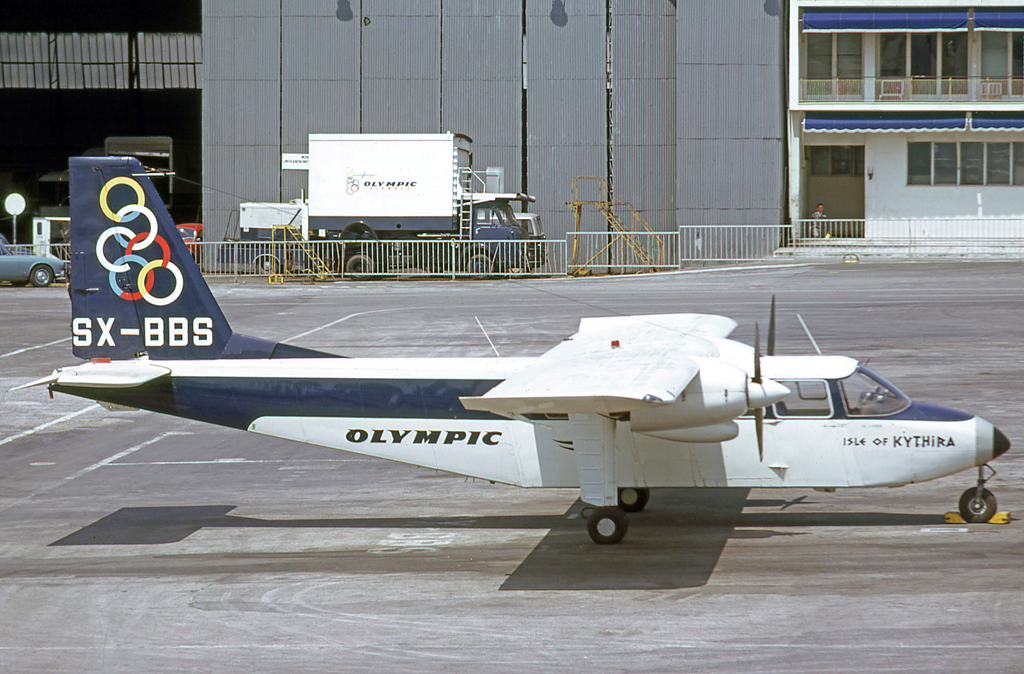
Olympic Aviation BN.2 Islander at Athens airport in April 1973

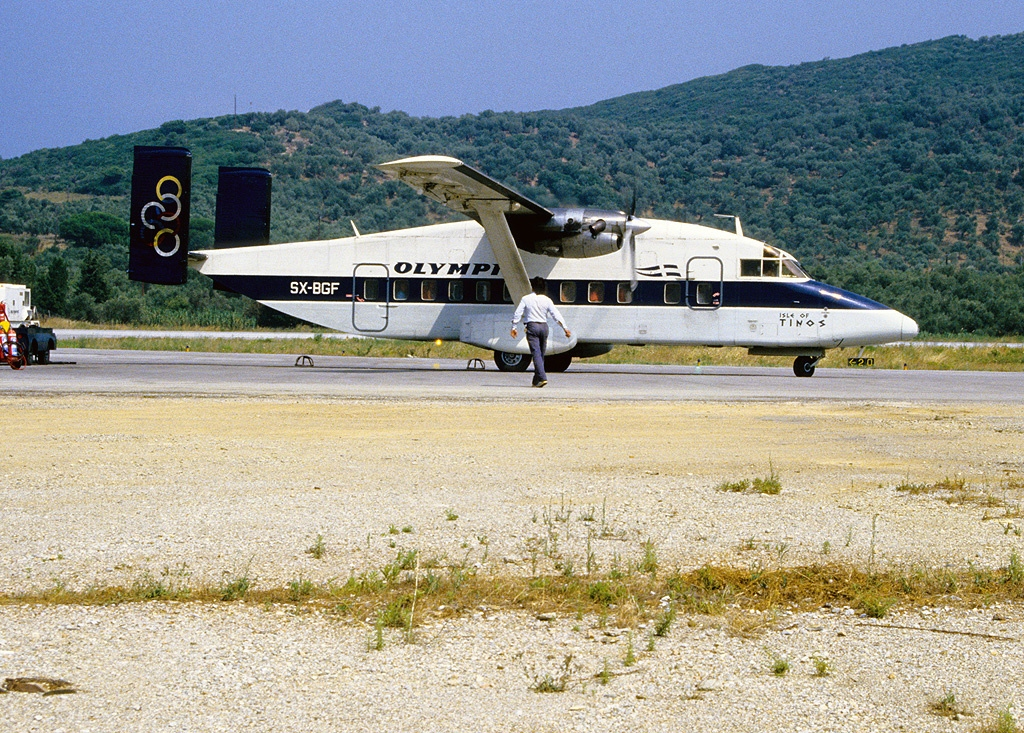
An Olympic Shorts 330, Skiathos 1986

Olympic Aviation was a subsidiary of Olympic Airways, the Greek national flag carrier.

== History ==
Olympic Aviation was created on 2nd August 1971 to take over the operations of the light aircraft and helicopter division of Olympic Airways, with Alexander Onassis appointed as President. It expanded to provide an airline service between mainland Greece and various Greek islands inaccessible to the larger aircraft in the parent company (Olympic Airways) fleet, using types such as the BN-2 Islander and Short Skyvan. In 1980 when Olympic Airlines retired their YS-11 aircraft, Olympic Aviation took over their services with a fleet of Shorts 330. In 1984 a number of 19-seat Dornier 228 were introduced, replacing the Islanders & Skyvans. And in 1990/91 a larger number of ATR 42 & ATR 72 aircraft began arriving, replacing the Shorts 330s, and at the same time allowing a considerable increase in capacity. Finally in 1999 Olympic Aviation purchased three Boeing 717, their first jet aircraft.

The company was also responsible for charter flights in the Olympic Airways Group of Companies, until Macedonian Airlines was created in 1992.

=== Olympic Aviation Flight Academy ===
The Flight Academy operated under the supervision of Olympic Aviation, using flight simulators for ATR-42/72 aircraft, as well as Boeing 737-200/300/400 aircraft.

== Fleet ==
=== Airliner types re-integrated into Olympic Airlines at December 2003 ===
- ATR 42 (since 1990);
- ATR 72 (since 1989);
- Boeing 717-200 (since 2000);

The three Boeing 717 aircraft were leased to serve some of Olympic Aviation's European flights, based at Makedonia Airport of Thessaloniki. Shortly after the retirement of the Olympic Airways's Boeing 737-200s, the 717s were used on Olympic Airways's European destinations.

=== Historical fleet ===
Airliner types

- Britten-Norman BN-2 Islander (1971-1985)
- Dornier 228 (1983-2003)
- Shorts Skyvan (1970-1990)
- Shorts 330-200 (1980-1992)

Light aircraft types

- Cessna 150/152; e.g. SX-BDG/P/Q/R
- Piaggio P.136; Amphibious aircraft (two, SX-BDB & SX-BDC), often used by Onassis family in conjunction with private yacht Christina O.
- Piper Aztec; (1968-1992) e.g. SX-BDE, SX-BDL
- Piper Cherokee; (1969-1973) e.g. SX-BDF/I/K/M
- Piper Navajo; (1968-1973) SX-BDD
- Piper PA-44 Seminole; SX-BDZ

Helicopters

- Alouette III; e.g. SX-HAC/I/N
- Agusta A.109 Hirundo; e.g. SX-HDA
- Bell 206 Jetranger; SX-HBF
- AS350; e.g. SX-HBI
- Hughes 269; e.g. SX-HNB
- MBB Bolkow Bo 105; e.g. SX-HET
- Aérospatiale SA 321 Super Frelon; F-OCMF

In December 2003, the flight academy as well as most of the Olympic Airways Group companies, became part of a new company called Olympic Airways - Services S.A.. Olympic Aviation continues to operate, mainly to provide helicopter charter services, under the Olympic Airways - Services management. Its turboprop and jet aircraft fleet, as well as that of Olympic Airways and Macedonian Airlines was integrated into a new company, Olympic Airlines.

== Accidents and incidents ==
- 22 January, 1973: a Piaggio P.136L-2 amphibious plane (SX-BDC) crashed shortly after takeoff from Athens (Ellinikon Airport) runway 33. The crash occurred as a result of the reversing of the aileron connecting cables during the installation of a new control column on the plane. President of Olympic Aviation, Alexander Onassis was evaluating a new pilot (Donald McCusker) and was accompanied by his then regular pilot (Donald McGregor). McCusker and McGregor survived with serious injuries, but Onassis died 27 hours later as a result of his injuries sustained in the accident.
- 3 August, 1989: an Olympic Aviation Short 330, operating as Olympic Aviation Flight 545, flew into the cloud-shrouded Mount Kerkis on Samos island, Greece, while attempting a landing approach. All 3 crew members and 31 passengers were killed.
