= Olympic Airlines =

National airline of Greece (1957–2009)

Olympic Airlines Ολυμπιακές Αερογραμμές
IATA	ICAO	Call sign
OA	OAL	OLYMPIC
- Founded: 6 April 1957
- Ceased operations: 29 September 2009 (sold name and logo to Olympic Air)
- AOC #: GR-003
- Hubs: Athens–Ellinikon (1957—2001); Athens–Venizelos (2001—2009); Thessaloniki
- Focus cities: London–Heathrow
- Frequent-flyer program: Icarus Frequent Flyer Programme
- Subsidiaries: Macedonian Airlines (1992—2003)
- Parent company: Government of Greece
- Headquarters: Athens, Greece

Olympic Airlines (Greek: Ολυμπιακές Αερογραμμές, Olympiakés Aerogrammés – OA), formerly named Olympic Airways, was the flag carrier airline of Greece. The airline's head office was located in Athens. The airline operated services to 37 domestic destinations and to 32 destinations worldwide. The airline's main base was at Athens International Airport, "Eleftherios Venizelos", with hubs at Thessaloniki International Airport, "Macedonia", Heraklion International Airport, "Nikos Kazantzakis" and Rhodes International Airport, "Diagoras". Olympic Airlines also owned a base at London Heathrow Airport. By December 2007, the airline employed about 8,500 staff.

Olympic Airlines was also accredited by IATA with the IOSA (IATA Operational Safety Audit) for their safety practices.

On 6 March 2009, the Greek State announced it had reached an agreement to sell the flight operations, ground handling operations and technical base of the group to Marfin Investment Group, the largest Greek investment fund, thus ending 35 years of state ownership.

On 29 September 2009, Olympic Airlines ceased all operations and most flights. Olympic Air, the new airline formed from privatization, commenced flights. Olympic Airlines continued to operate some public service flights to Greek islands as well as some flights to destinations outside the European Union (Cairo, Alexandria, Tel Aviv, Beirut, Belgrade) until the Greek State conducted a public tender and redistributed the routes.

On 31 December 2009, Olympic Airlines ceased all operations, as flights to Greek islands had already been allocated and were being flown by other carriers, and flights to destinations outside the European Union had been allocated to other carriers who started operating them from 1 January 2010. Until the final closure, Olympic Airlines used the temporary code OP for their flights (instead of OA, which is used by their successor, Olympic Air). All Olympic Airlines flights (using the OP code) since 29 September 2009 and until the final deadline of 31 December 2009, were operated by Olympic Air on a wet lease basis.

The 31 December 2009 deadline as the final possible date that Olympic Airlines should cease operations, was agreed between the Greek Government and the European Commission as part of the deal to close Olympic Airlines and sell the name and assets to Olympic Air. It was initially expected that operations would end much earlier, but due to the change of government in October 2009, the public tenders for the reallocation of subsidized flights to the Greek islands and international flight rights outside the European Union were postponed. The company stayed alive until the final deadline of 31 December 2009.

Aegean Airlines succeeded the airline as the country’s flag carrier.

== History ==
The first logo of Olympic, in 1957

Icarus, the first predecessor airline to Olympic, was established in 1930. After just a few months Icarus went bankrupt due to financial problems and limited Greek interest in air transport. Ε.Ε.Ε.Σ. (Ελληνική Εταιρεία Εναέριων Συγκοινωνιών, Greek Company for Air Transport) took its place. At the same time, in 1935, a second airline was created, the privately owned T.A.E. (Τεχνικαί Αεροπορικαί Εκμεταλλεύσεις, Technical and Aeronautical Exploitations). Soon after World War II, in 1947, three airlines were based in Greece: T.A.E., ΕΛΛ.Α.Σ. (Ελληνικαί Αεροπορικαί Συγκοινωνίαι, Greek Air Transport) and Α.Μ.Ε. (Αεροπορικαί Μεταφοραί Ελλάδος, Hellenic Air Transport).

=== Onassis era ===
Revenue passenger-kilometers, scheduled flights only, in millions
Year	Traffic
1957	85
1960	289
1965	542
1969	1718
1971	2343
1975	3430
1980	5062
1985	7468
1995	7945

The former Olympic Airways logo

In 1951 the poor financial state of the three airlines led to a decision by the Greek state to merge them into a single operator, TAE Greek National Airlines (TAE). The new airline operated a fleet of twin-engine Douglas DC-3 airliners on domestic Greek routes until the last example was disposed of in May 1970. A four-engine Douglas DC-4 was acquired in 1950 and this was operated on a route to London. The new airline faced financial problems so the government closed it down in 1955.

There were no buyers for the airline so the Greek State bought the company back. In July 1956 the Greek State reached an agreement with the Greek shipping magnate Aristotle Onassis for Onassis to purchase the airline. The company flew under the T.A.E. name until the end of the year and for the first few months of 1957. On 6 April 1957, the company was renamed Olympic Airways (Ολυμπιακή Αεροπορία/Olympiaki Aeroporia).

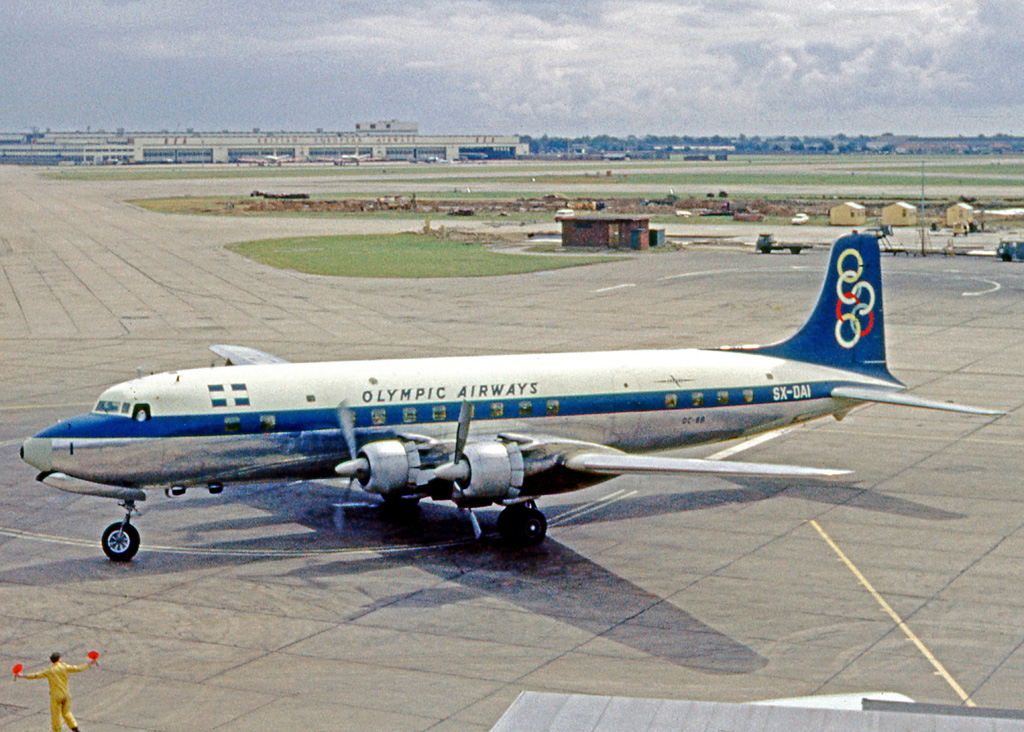
Olympic Airways operated ten Douglas DC-6Bs between 1958 and 1972 serving the longer domestic and European routes.

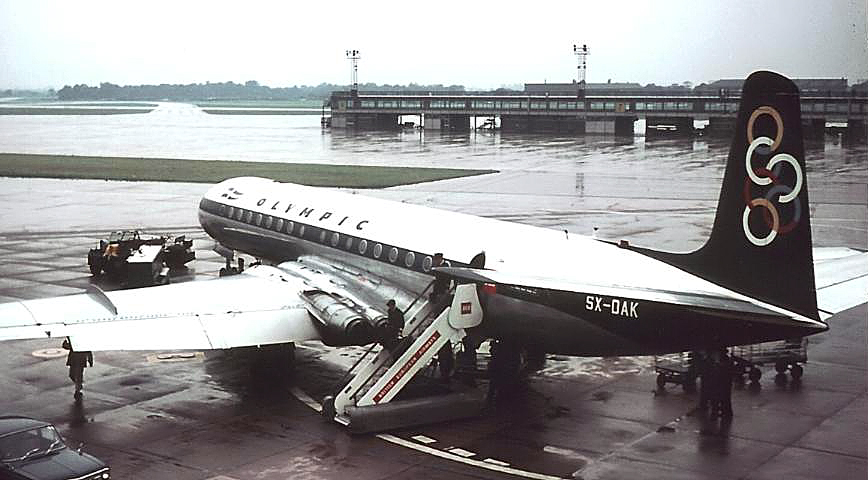
Olympic Airways' first jet aircraft type, the de Havilland Comet at Manchester Airport in 1966. The BEA codeshare logo can be partially seen on the fuselage, in red.

The new company developed rapidly. To allay the Greek public's distrust of air transport, Onassis developed the "aviation days of ’57" scheme, providing short, free flights in a DC-3 to demonstrate the reliability of air travel. Onassis always wanted to be in the cutting edge of the technology, so in 1959 he signed a deal to buy four de Havilland Comet 4B that in 1960 was Olympic's first jet aircraft, that entered service. Olympic and British European Airways created the first codeshare flights; later the companies expanded their cooperation. When Greek crews had to spend a night in London, British crews would fly the Olympic Comets to BEA destinations, and the same with Greek crews and BEA Comets. On all BEA and OA Comets, there would be a "BEA-OLYMPIC" sign. In 1962 Olympic set a record for flying a DH Comet 4B from London to Athens in just two hours and 51 minutes.

In 1965 Olympic ordered Boeing 707-320 jets; they received the first, bearing the name "City of Athens", in 1966. Olympic's first Boeing 707 service was also the inauguration of a non-stop route connecting Athens and New York City (JFK). In 1968 Olympic began serving Africa, with a twice-weekly round-trip linking Athens with Nairobi and Johannesburg. The same year OA received the first of a fleet of Boeing 727-200 jet aircraft. A new Athens-Montreal-Chicago service commenced in 1969. Also in 1969, the airline phased out their Comet 4Bs.

Under Onassis' leadership, the airline gained a reputation for lavish style. The cabin crews were attired in Pierre Cardin-designed uniforms and passengers ate with golden cutlery and listened to the stylings of a pianist in the first-class cabin.

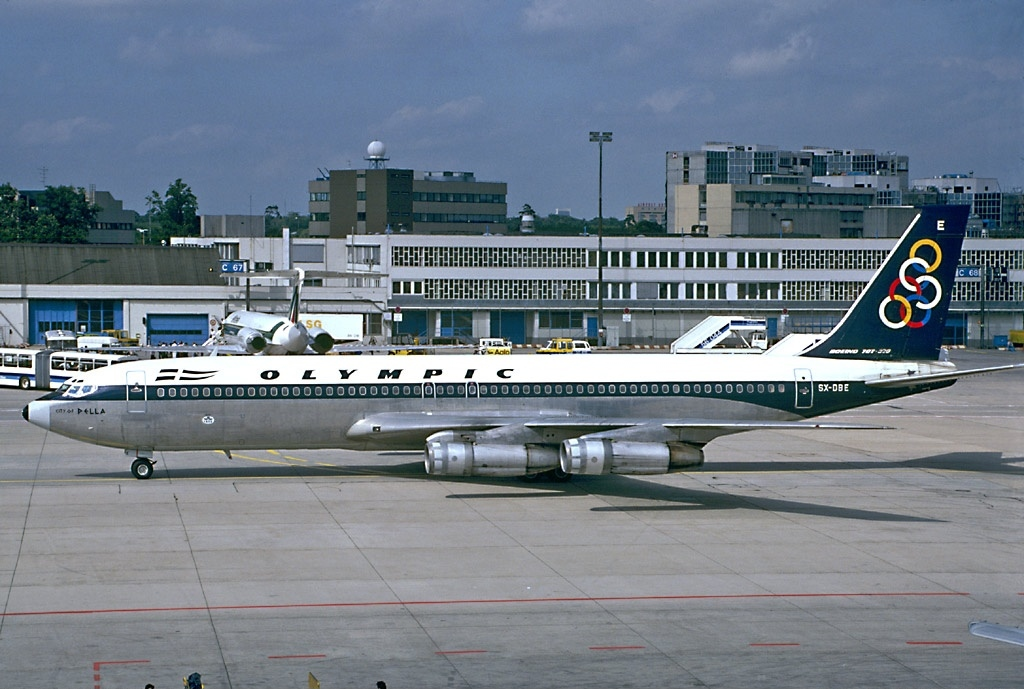
Olympic Airways Boeing 707-384B SX-DBE in 1989, still in the original scheme with bare metal lower fuselage

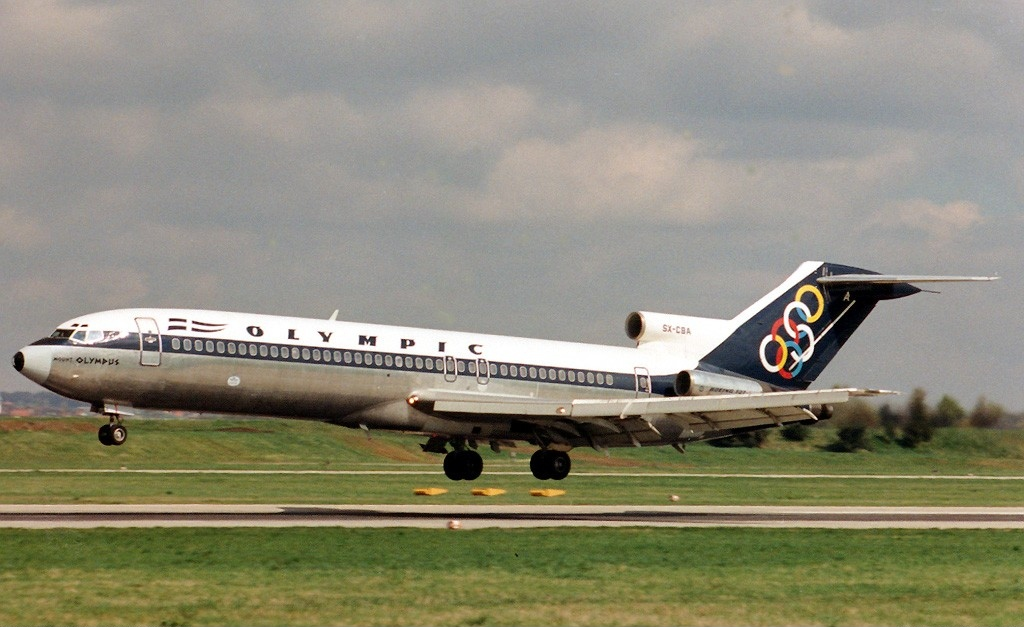
Olympic Airways Boeing 727-284 SX-CBA in 1987

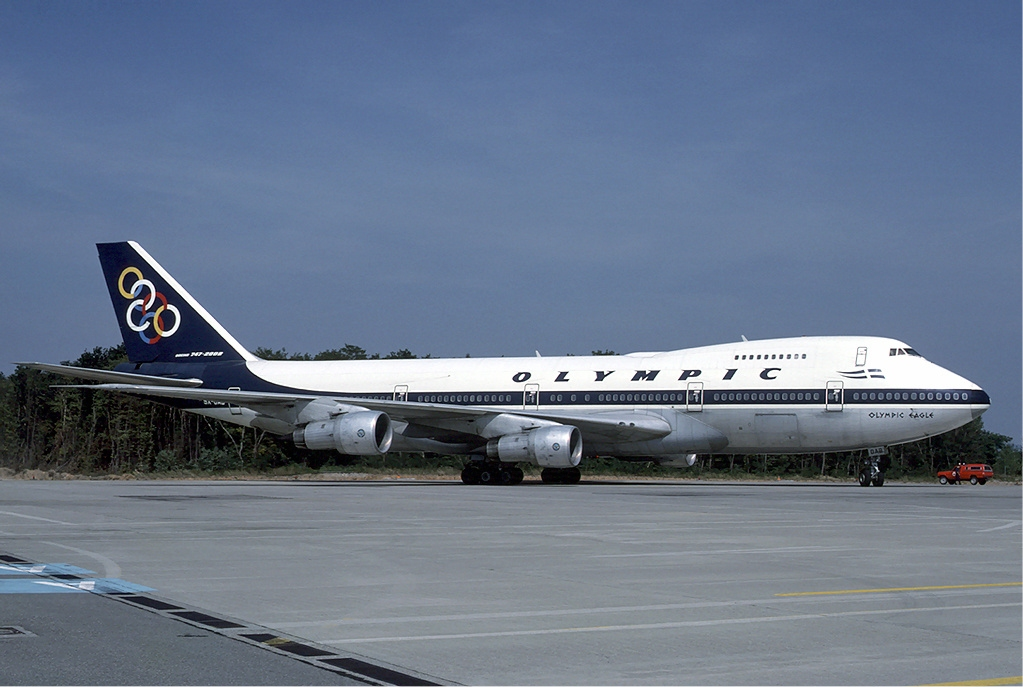
Olympic Airways Boeing 747-200, in 1986

In 1971 OA purchased new NAMC YS-11 twin-turboprop aircraft to replace the ageing non-pressurized Douglas DC-3 and the Douglas DC-6 pressurized piston-engined airliners still in use on the company's Greek domestic network. In that year they created a subsidiary airline, Olympic Aviation/Ολυμπιακή Αεροπλοΐα, to serve the Greek islands more economically and efficiently. To further this strategy, several examples of the small twin-engined turbo-propeller Short Skyvan utility airliner were obtained for operation on routes serving smaller Greek airports. In 1972 Olympic turned to the important Greece-Australia market, beginning Boeing 707-320 operations between Athens and Melbourne twice a week via Bangkok and Singapore.

Olympic then acquired seven Boeing 720-051B aircraft, a medium-range derivative of the Boeing 707, from Northwest Airlines. The airline also entered the wide-body era by purchasing two new Boeing 747-200s. OA even showed interest in the BAC-Aérospatiale Concorde supersonic airliner and, on 5 January 1973, a Concorde landed at Athens' Hellenikon Airport to give a demonstration.

=== Post-Onassis era ===
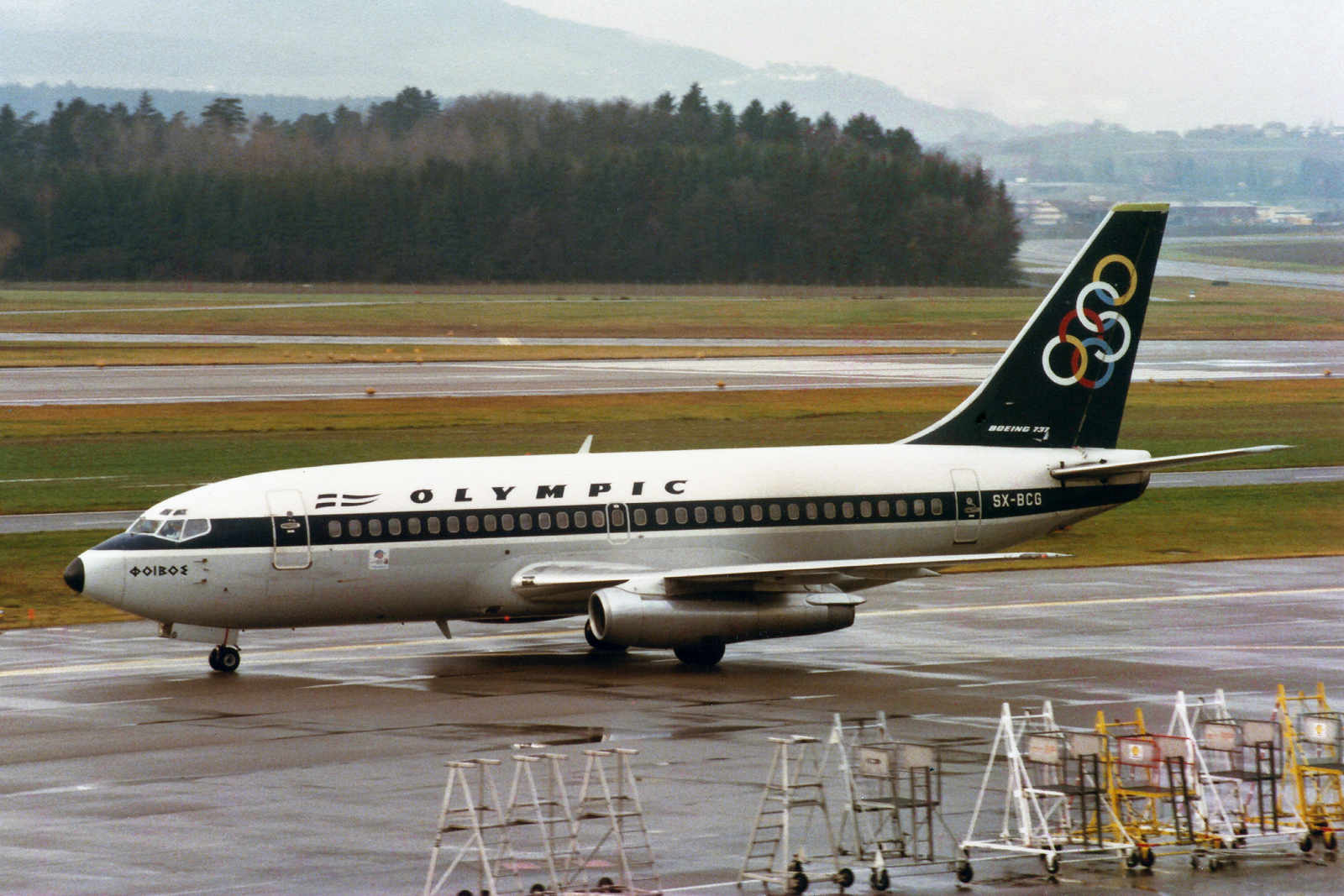
Olympic Airways Boeing 737-284adv SX-BCG "Phoebus", in 1984

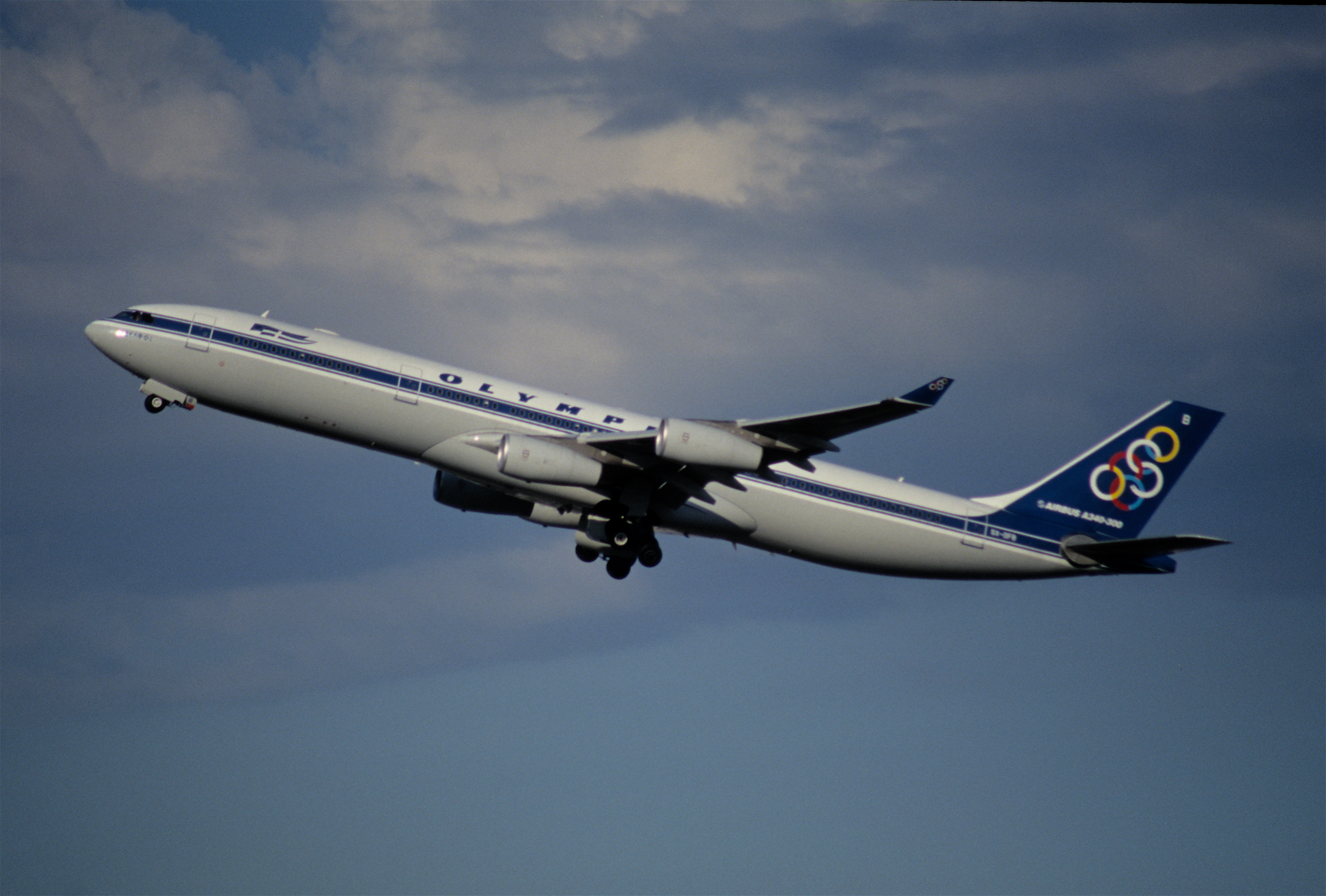
Olympic Airways Airbus A340-313 SX-DFB departing Sydney, 1999

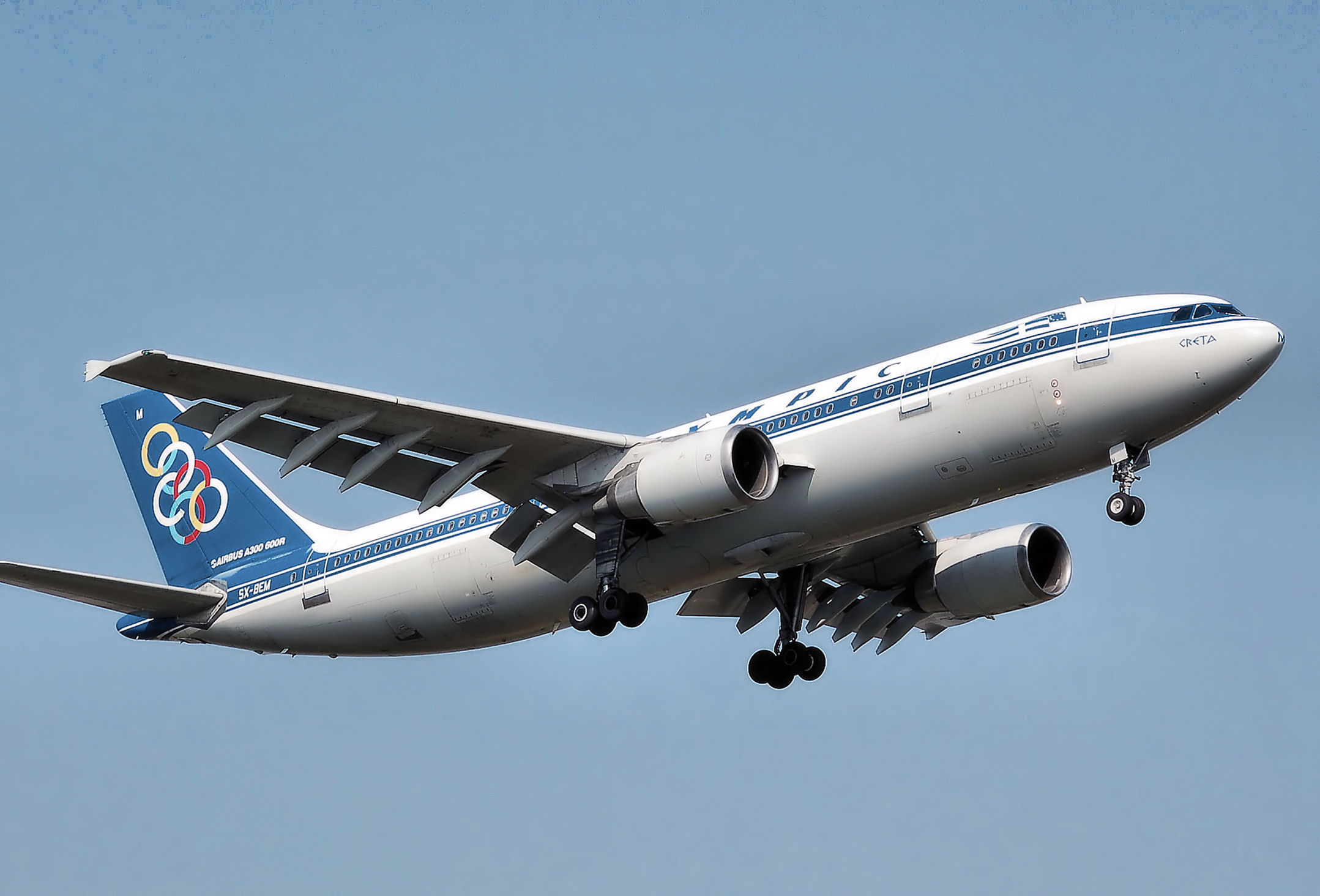
Olympic Airlines Airbus A300B4-600R, in 2007

On 23 January 1973, Aristotle Onassis' son, Alexander, died in a plane crash; the event came as a shock to the Greek people and a new phase began for Olympic Airways. A few months later, Onassis sold all of the OA shares to the Greek state and he died shortly afterwards (in 1975). In 1976, under state management, OA purchased eleven Boeing 737-200 jet aircraft and created Olympic Catering, which served both OA and foreign airlines. In 1977, in a cost-cutting effort, OA shut down their Australia route, followed by the Canadian one in 1978, when OA also placed orders for four Airbus A300s, plus four options.

In 1984, three more B747-200 aircraft were purchased from Singapore Airlines, and the Canadian and Australian routes were reopened. A new Olympic Airways Cargo division was created by converting the Boeing 707-320 "City of Lindos", but the plans were soon abandoned. In 1986, there were strikes at OA, and financial losses mounted.

The company faced serious financial trouble from the 1980s on, mostly because of management problems. Greek politicians and their families travelled for free or token amounts on the airline. Successive Greek governments also made Olympic carry the press at a 97 percent discount. Olympic AirTours (Ολυμπιακή Τουριστική) was created as a subsidiary of OA, which issued tickets not only for OA, but for other airlines as well. Very soon, Olympic AirTours was renamed Macedonian Airlines and reestablished as a charter flight company.

In 1990 a route to Tokyo via Bangkok was launched but Olympic was soon forced to shut it down, despite very high load factors (95%). Olympic purchased seven Boeing 737-400 aircraft in 1991, as well as the advanced version of the A300, the A300-600R. Due to the rising losses and debts, the government decided to formulate a restructuring program in which all debts were erased. This programme, as well as all the plans that followed, failed. A few years later, in an attempt to make OA profitable, management was given to British Airways (Speedwing International Ltd). The result was even larger debts and rising losses. In 1999, Olympic purchased four Airbus A340-313X aircraft, to replace the ageing B747-200.

=== Olympic Airways to Olympic Airlines ===
By December 2003, the Olympic Airways Group of Companies owned Olympic Airways (Ολυμπιακή Αεροπορία), Olympic Aviation (Ολυμπιακή Αεροπλοϊα), Macedonian Airlines (Mακεδονικές Αερογραμμές), Galileo Hellas (Γαλιλλαίος Ελλάς), Olympic Fuel Company (Ολυμπιακή Εταιρεία Καυσίμων), and Olympic Into-Plane Company. Olympic Catering had been sold a few months earlier. A company formed in the ’80s called Olympic AirTours (Ολυμπιακή Τουριστική) had already been transformed into Macedonian Airlines.

Very soon the losses became excessive, so in 2003, the government restructured the Olympic Airways Group of Companies. The subsidiary, Macedonian Airlines S.A., was renamed Olympic Airlines S.A. and took over the flight operations of Olympic Airways, erasing at the same time all of the airline's debts. The remaining group companies, except for Olympic Aviation (Olympic Airways, Olympic Into-Plane Company, Olympic Fuel Company, Olympic Airways Handling and the Olympic Airways Technical Base), merged and formed a new company, called Olympic Airways – Services S.A.. In December 2004, the Greek government decided to privatize Olympic Airlines, but the sale process failed as none of the buyers was eager to repay the Greek state almost 700 million euros in state aid, which was later declared illegal by the European Commission in December 2005.

In 2005, the Greek Government looked for potential buyers to privatize OA. In April of that year, a short list of potential buyers was submitted that included Aegean Airlines, German LCC DBA and a Greek-American consortium called Olympic Investors. Shortly afterwards Aegean Airlines pulled out, followed by DBA. In September 2005, the Greek government signed a non-binding agreement with Olympic Investors to buy the airline. In an interview, Olympic Investors stated that they were backed by York Capital with 6.5 billion dollars and assured that OA's workers would not lose their jobs. They stated that OA should continue to operate as an integrated company and that they were not interested in buying just parts of OA. By the end of the year, the offer fell through because the huge fine imposed on the airline by the European Commission had not been dealt with.

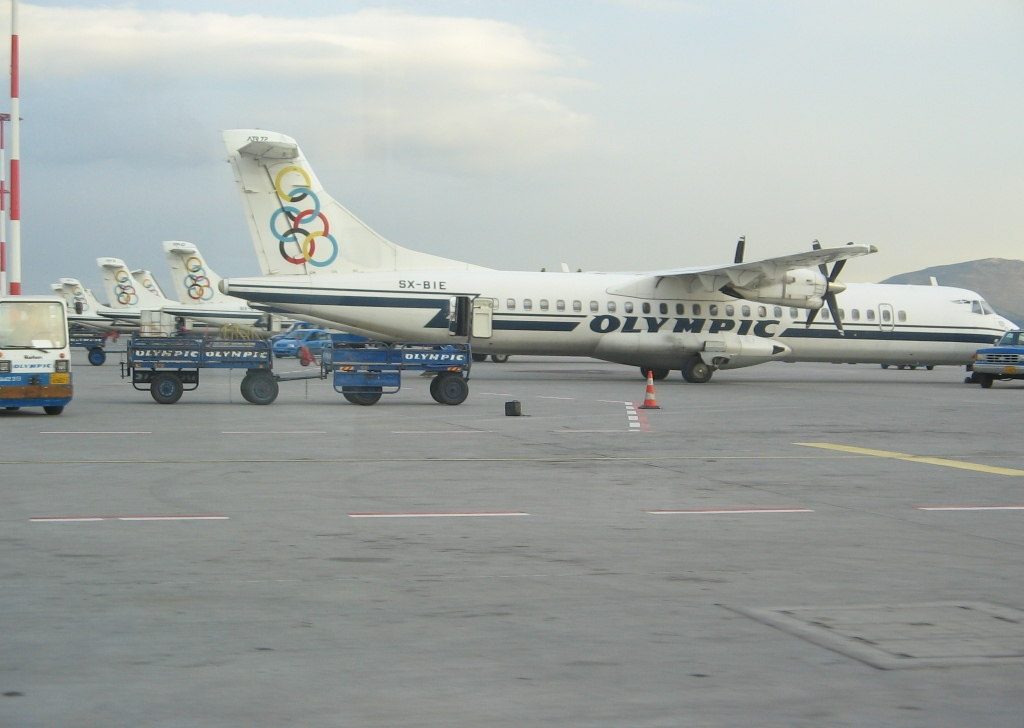
Olympic Airlines ATR 72-202 (still in Olympic Aviation colours), in 2006

According to Greek media, the government planned to relaunch the company in late 2006. The code name for the project was Pantheon Airways. In June 2006, Greek media reported that Sabre Aviation Consulting Services was contracted by the Greek government to find investors and develop a business plan for an airline to replace Olympic Airlines, aiming to begin operations in autumn 2006. Under this plan, the government would be a minority shareholder of the new carrier, which would be run as a private airline. The planned re-launch date passed without anything happening, and the plan was temporarily frozen.

In 2006 O.A. was thrown a lifeline when the courts ordered Greece to repay them almost 564 million euros owed to the airline. The money was owed to O.A. from legally subsidized routes to Greek islands and the costs of the relocation to the new airport. The money would be used to pay back part of the state aid declared illegal by the European Commission in December 2005. Olympic Airlines redesigned their website to introduce their e-ticket service, launched on 31 July 2007, in response to the surge of online booking and online check-ins. The e-ticket service introduction by Electronic Data Systems meant Olympic abolished their old "Hermes" booking system, which had served the company for more than two decades. As of November 2007, the e-ticket service was available on all European and International routes, and on 19 of the airline's 37 domestic routes.

On 12 September 2007, the Luxembourg-based EU court ruled that Olympic should repay an amount of money less than what the EU Commission had ordered. This amount included unpaid taxes on fuel and spare parts, as well as unpaid fees to Athens International Airport. The new amount owed by Olympic was €130 million, as compared with the original €160 million. On that same day, Olympic Investors, the Greek-American consortium that was interested in buying Olympic in 2005, stated renewed interest in buying the airline.

In November 2007, Irish airline Ryanair filed a suit with the European Commission, saying that they had not looked into their claims that Olympic had not paid back their debt. On 1 December 2007 transport minister Kostas Hatzidakis announced that the entire Olympic Airways Group debts amounted to two billion euros and that the airline in its then form and size would cease existing in 2008. This was deemed to be the only way for the European Commission to write off the company's debts to the Greek public sector. He stated that Athens was under more pressure to recover the money Olympic owed because of the Ryanair lawsuit.

Despite all predictions, traffic for Olympic in 2007 increased to a total of 5,977,104 passengers (3,115,521 on domestic and 2,681,583 on international flights) compared to approximately 5,500,000 passengers in 2006. It is estimated that OA earned approximately 780 million euros in 2007, 500 of which came from international flights. However, in 2008 due to lack of aircraft Olympic Airlines cancelled or merged a significant number of flights, about 6,000 according to their union (as of 26 August 2008). Olympic Airlines officials have declared that this is not the major problem since "after all the income reduction is only 4–5 million euros compared to the initial budget plan".

=== Olympic Airlines to Olympic Air ===
On 6 March 2009, Development Minister Kostis Hatzidakis announced the sale of the flight operations and the technical base companies to Marfin Investment Group (MIG). As a result, after 35 years of state control and 10 years of failed sales attempts, Olympic once again became a private corporation. The new owners were to secure approximately 5000 of the 8500 jobs of the Group.

On 28 September 2009, Olympic Airlines ceased to fly to most of their 69 destinations, maintaining flights to Tel Aviv, Beirut, Cairo and all public service obligation routes within Greece, until the Ministry for Transport and Communications redistributed the routes in late November, when Olympic Airlines entered liquidation. Existing passengers were accommodated on other airlines. Employees of the old company who were in destinations no longer served may have been affected.

The last Olympic Airlines flight was flight 424 from Toronto via Montreal, landing at 11:10 on 29 September 2009 at the Athens International Airport. Olympic Air took over the rest of the operations on 29 September 2009 and their first flight was on 1 October 2009 at 06:20 leaving the Athens International Airport and heading to Thessaloniki Makedonia Airport.

== Destinations ==
Before their demise in 2009, Olympic Airlines flew to 37 domestic and 32 international destinations throughout 23 countries.

== Fleet ==
=== Final fleet ===
Olympic Airlines operated the following fleet at the time of closure:

Olympic Airlines fleet
Aircraft	In service	Passengers	Type	Routes	Notes
Airbus A340-313X	1	295	Jet aircraft	Long Haul/International-Transoceanic	Owned by the Greek government
Boeing 737-300	0	136	Jet aircraft	Medium Haul & Short Haul	
Boeing 737-400	0	150	Jet aircraft	Medium Haul & Short Haul	
ATR 42-320	7	50	Turboprop	Short Haul/Regional	
ATR 72-202	11	68	Turboprop	Short Haul/Regional	
Bombardier Dash 8-102	2	37	Turboprop	Short Haul/Regional	Transferred to Olympic Air
Total	21				

=== Former fleet ===
Olympic Airlines has previously operated the following aircraft: (note Boeing aircraft with customer code '84' were purchased as new)

Olympic Airlines/Airways former fleet
Aircraft	Total	Passengers	Type	Routes	Notes
Airbus A300B2/B4/605R	13	233	Wide-body Jet	High-density routes	
Boeing 707-384 (& -351C)	6 + 2	147-165	Jet aircraft	Long & medium haul	incl two ex-Northwest Airlines -351C
Boeing 717-200	3	105	Jet aircraft	Short & medium haul Greece and Europe	2 leased from Bavaria; 1 leased from Pembroke Capital (BOC)
Boeing 720-051B	7	160	Jet aircraft	Short & medium haul Europe, Middle East	ex Northwest Airlines
Boeing 727-30	2		Jet aircraft	Short and medium-haul	6 month lease from Boeing
Boeing 727-284 (& -230/Adv)	7 + 3	146	Jet aircraft	Short & medium haul Europe, Middle East	incl three ex-Condor (-230/Adv)
Boeing 737-284	15	123	Jet aircraft	Short & medium haul Greece and Europe	4 leased from Aviation Sales Company
Boeing 747-284B (& -212B)	2 + 3	426	Wide-body Jet	Long haul e.g. N.America, Asia	incl three ex Singapore Airlines (-212B)
Dassault Falcon 900	1	19	Executive jet	ad-hoc	operated in Olympic Airways colours, on behalf of Greek Government
de Havilland Comet 4B	6	80-90	Jet aircraft	Medium haul Europe, Middle East	2 leased from BEA (BEA-OLYMPIC)
Douglas DC-3	14	28	Piston engined aircraft	Short haul Domestic and Balkans	Previously flew with TAE (Greek National Airlines)
Douglas DC-4	2		Piston engined aircraft	Short & medium haul Domestic and Europe	
Douglas DC-6	13	66 (1958), 95 (1967)	Piston engined aircraft	Short & medium haul Domestic and Europe	3 were leased from U.A.T.
NAMC YS-11	10	64	Turbo-Prop	Short haul Domestic & Island services	2 leased from NAMC

Olympic Airlines/Airways regional airliners operated by Olympic Aviation
Aircraft	Total	Passengers	Type	Routes	Notes
Britten Norman BN2 Islander	4	9	Piston-powered aircraft	Short haul Domestic and Island services	operated by Olympic Aviation
Dornier 228	9	18	Turbo-Prop powered aircraft	Short haul Domestic and Island services	operated by Olympic Aviation
Shorts Skyvan	4	18	Turbo-Prop powered aircraft	Short haul Domestic and Island services	operated by Olympic Aviation
Shorts 330	6	30	Turbo-Prop powered aircraft	Short haul Domestic and Island services	operated by Olympic Aviation

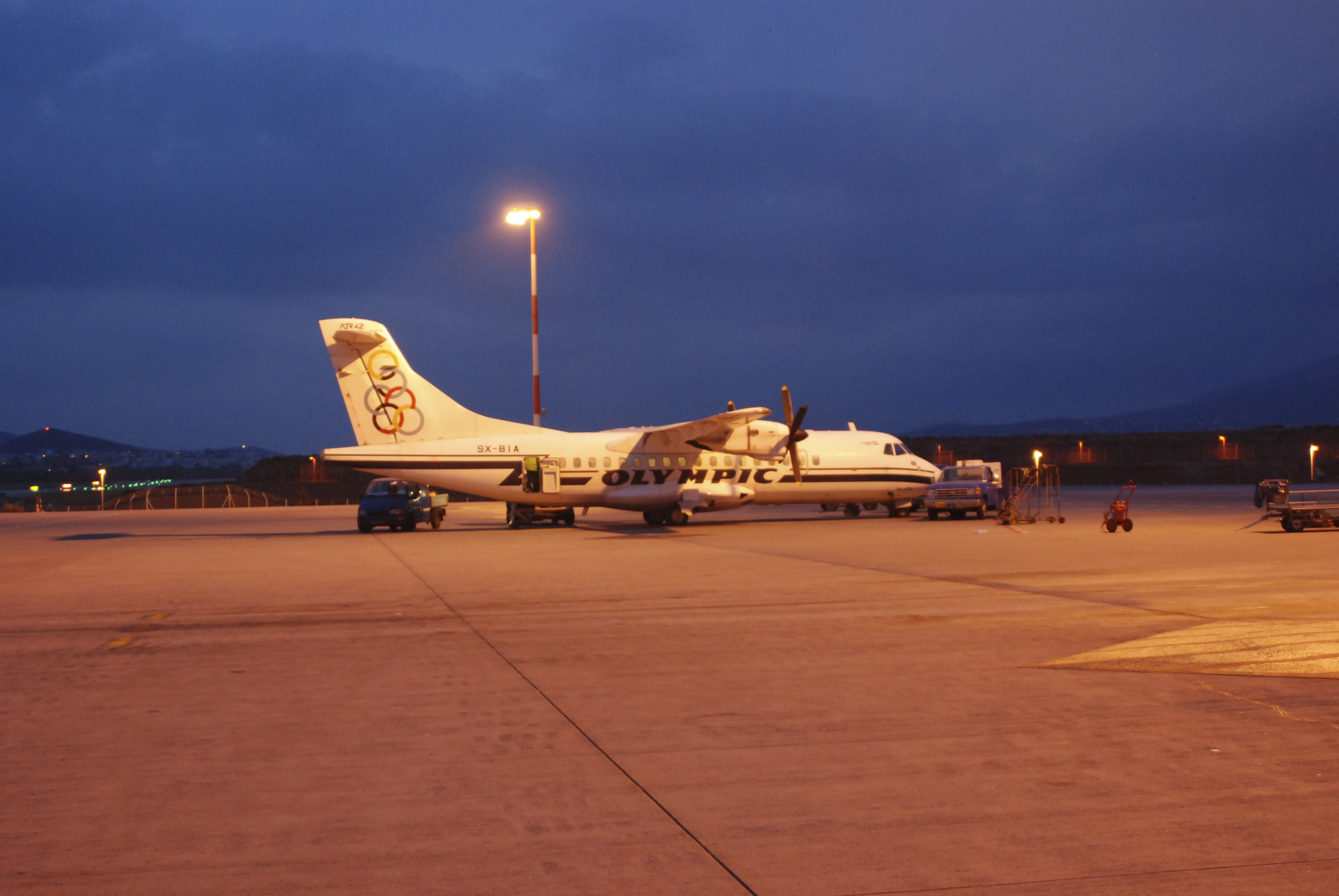
ATR 42-320

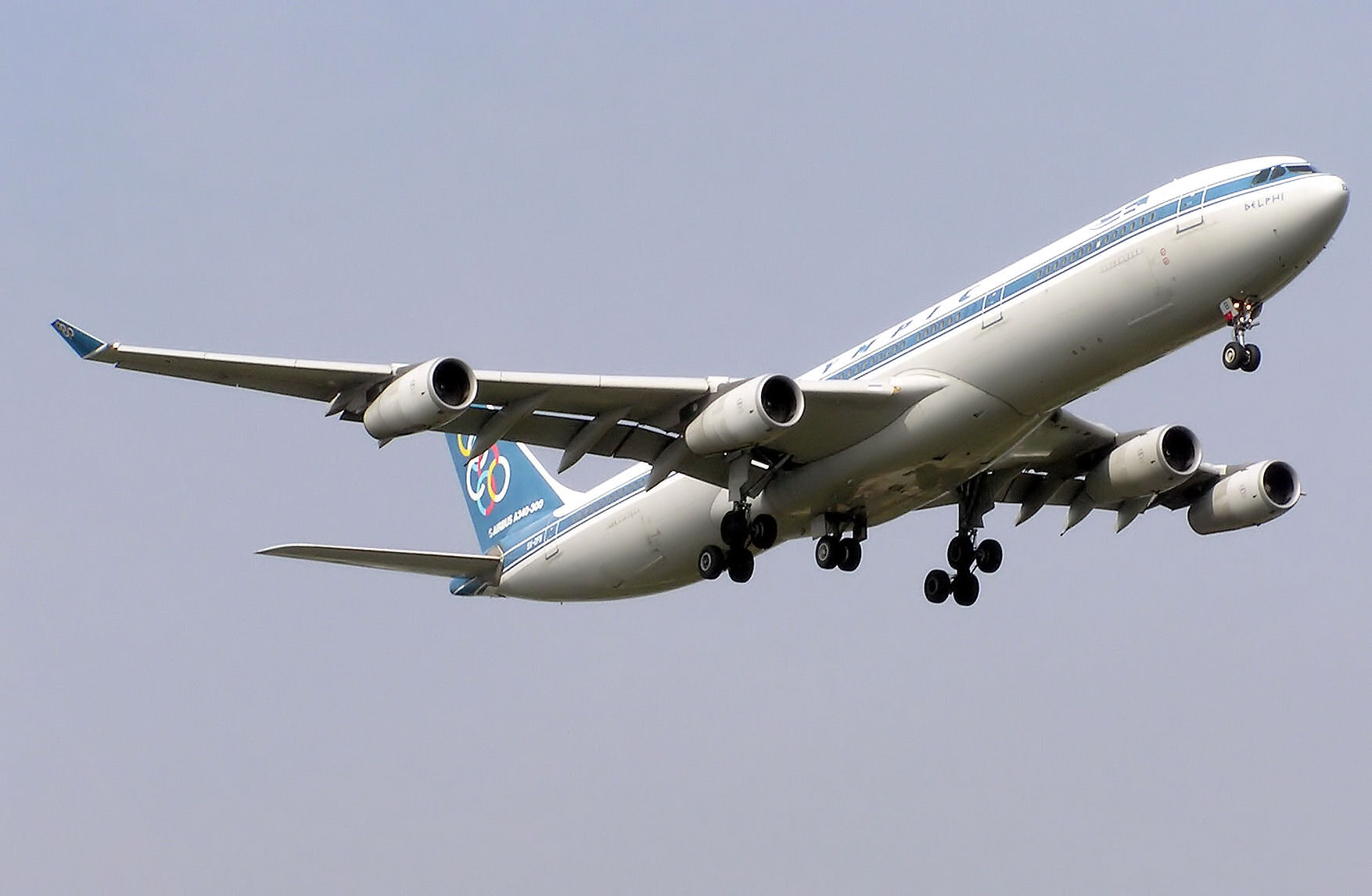
Airbus A340-300

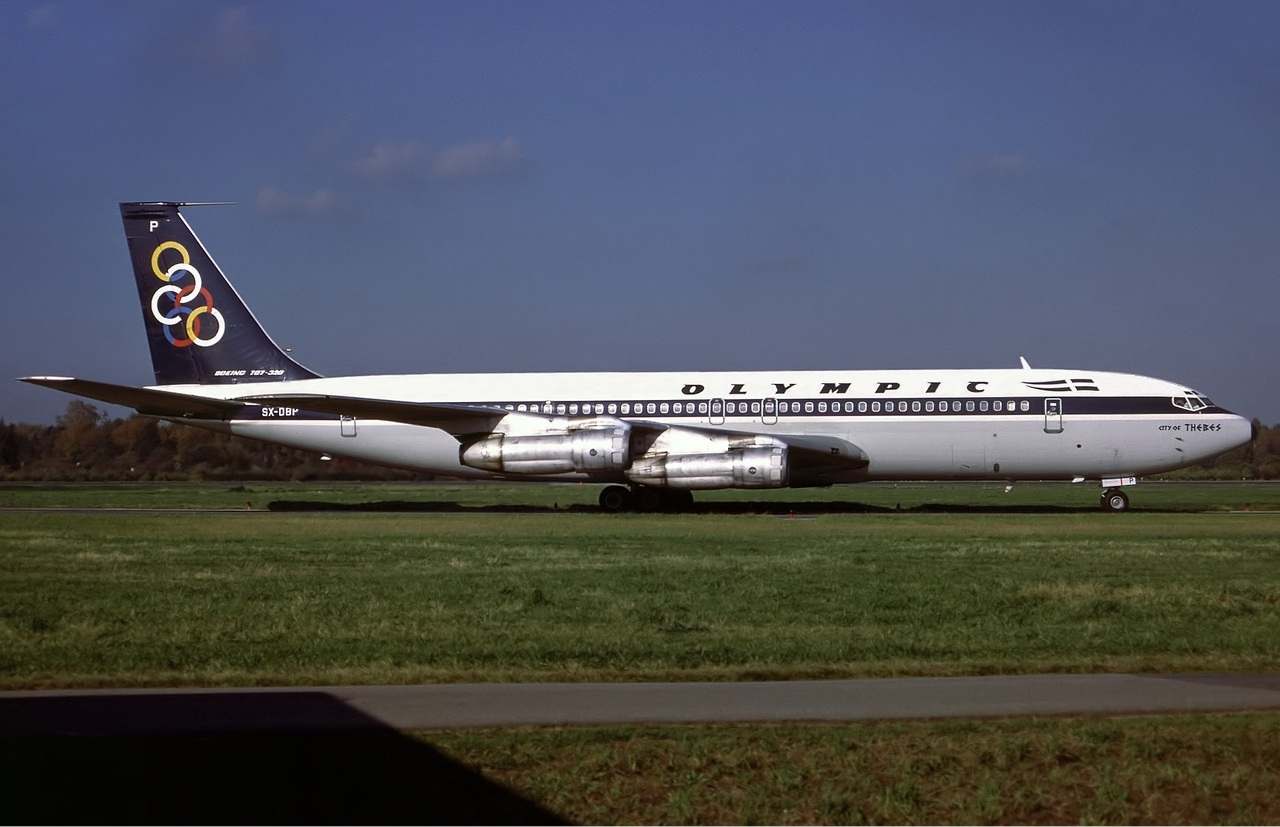
A Boeing 707 at Hamburg Airport in 1987

== Codeshare agreements ==
Olympic Airlines had the following codeshare agreements:

- Cyprus Airways connected Athens and Thessaloniki with Larnaca and Athens with Paphos (operated by Cyprus and Olympic)
- Air Malta connected Athens with Malta (operated by Air Malta)
- Czech Airlines connected Athens and Thessaloniki with Prague (operated by Czech CSA)
- Egypt Air connected Athens with Alexandria (operated by Olympic)
- Kuwait Airways connected Athens with Kuwait (operated by Olympic)

== Corporate design ==
=== Logo ===
The first logo of the airline was a white eagle, bearing a resemblance to a propeller, featuring five rings and the name Olympic. Just two years after the first flight, Onassis asked his associates to design a new logo and the coloured rings were created. Onassis wanted to copy the five coloured rings of the Olympic emblem, but the International Olympic Committee claimed the rights to the emblem, so a new, six-ring logo was introduced. The first five rings stand for the five continents, while the sixth stands for Greece. Colours used were yellow, red, blue and white.

The new logo for Olympic air was selected from among three proposals by an online vote which was open until 5 July 2009 on oalogo.gr. All proposals were expected to keep the six circles and to modernize the existing logo. The logo that was finally selected is a bevel version of the existing logo and font, with the exception that green has replaced the light blue on some circles. Green along with blue is one of MIG's corporate colours (as seen on Marfin Egnatia bank's logo for example) and was thus also used per the request of MIG on the new uniforms too.

=== Other ===
- The Olympic name came about as a result of Onassis' passion for ancient Greece. Many of his companies carried the Olympic name such as Olympic Maritime. He followed the same naming pattern for his ships (with names such as "Olympic Legacy", "Olympic Palm", "Olympic Explorer", etc.)
- According to OA regulations, all male flight attendants must wear a black tie, thus paying tribute to the late Alexander Onassis.
- Uniforms for OA flight attendants were created by famous fashion designers. The first uniform was designed by Jean Dessès in 1957, followed by uniforms designed by Coco Chanel (1966), Pierre Cardin (1969), Yiannis Tseklenis (1971), Roula Stathi (1976), Billy Bo (1981), Aspasia Gerel (1987), Makis Tselios (1992) and Artisti Italiani (1998).

== Olympic in popular culture ==
- In the film For Your Eyes Only, James Bond calls Miss Moneypenny to book a ticket with Olympic to Madrid.
- In the film Octopussy, James Bond stands in front of the 'Olympic Airways Building' while watching Kamal Khan leave Sotheby's auction house.
- A sunglass collection by Paul Frank Sunich is called "Olympic Airways".
- "Olympic Airways" is the fourth and last single from the album Antidotes by Foals.

== Incidents and accidents ==
- 29 October 1959: a Douglas DC-3 crashed in the locality of Klitys, on Mount Parnitha, near Athens, Greece. All 15 passengers and all three crew members perished. It was reported that one of the wings was detached from the plane.
- 16 August 1969: a Douglas DC-3 was hijacked on a domestic flight from Ellinikon International Airport, Athens to Agrinion Airport. The four hijackers demanded to be taken to Albania. The aircraft, possibly registered SX-BBF, landed at Valona.
- 8 December 1969: Olympic Airways Flight 954 crashed near Keratea, 21 miles southeast of Athens, Greece. All 85 passengers and all five crew members were killed.
- 22 July 1970: Olympic Airways Flight 255 was hijacked over Rhodes, Greece, by Palestinian terrorists and landed in Athens where they successfully negotiated the release of seven Palestinian terrorists from Greek prisons.
- 18 February 1972: an Olympic Aviation Learjet crashed off the coast of Monte Carlo. Both crew members were killed.
- 21 October 1972: a NAMC YS-11, operating as Olympic Airways Flight 506, crashed off the coast of Voula, Athens, about 3 miles south of Athens/Hellenikon airport, operating a flight from the island of Corfu (Kerkyra) to Athens, in a thunderstorm. Thirty-six passengers and the co-pilot drowned, while 16 passengers and the remaining three crew members were rescued.
- 23 November 1976: Olympic Airways Flight 830, an NAMC YS-11, crashed on Mount Metaxas, outside the village of Servia, near Kozani, Greece. All 46 passengers and four crew members perished. One of the plane's wings is still on the site, near a small church built in memory of the victims.
- 9 August 1978: Olympic Airways Flight 411, a Boeing 747-200, blew an engine upon takeoff from Athens-Ellinikon International Airport heading for New York-JFK (John F. Kennedy International Airport). The plane slowed to a dangerously low speed of 157 knots and was flying dangerously low over downtown Athens. Captain Sifis Migadis managed to gain enough speed and altitude to return the plane to Ellinikon.
- 3 August 1989: Olympic Aviation Flight 545, operated by a Shorts 330-200, flew into the cloud-shrouded Mount Kerkis on Samos island killing the 34 people on board.
- 12 August 1997: A Boeing 727-230 registered as SX-CBI on Olympic Airways Flight 171, inbound from Athens Ellinikon Airport, touched down late and was steered off the runway to avoid overrunning into the sea. None of the 35 passengers and crew were killed, but the aircraft was damaged beyond repair.
- 4 January 1998: a passenger on Olympic Airways Flight 417 died of an allergic reaction to cigarette smoke when a flight attendant, against policy, refused to change his seat. The airline banned all smoking from 15 April 2001. The wife of the deceased, Rubina Husain, won compensation of $1.4 million at a lawsuit before a US court. The US Supreme Court upheld that decision.
- 14 September 1999: Olympic Airways Flight 3838, a Dassault Falcon 900B registered as SX-ECH and operating for the Hellenic Air Force, experienced severe pilot-induced oscillations during descent into Bucharest Otopeni Airport. The aircraft landed safely, but seven of the ten passengers on board died as a result of injuries. These included Greek Deputy Foreign Minister Giannos Kranidiotis, and several of his party.

== Bibliography ==
- Gradidge, Jennifer, The Douglas DC-1, DC-2, DC-3 – The First Seventy Years, 2006, Air-Britain (Historians) Ltd, ISBN 0-85130-332-3.
- Roach, J. and Eastwood, A. B., Piston Engined Airliner Production List, 2007, The Aviation Hobby Shop, ISBN none.
