= Olympic Air =

Regional airline of Greece

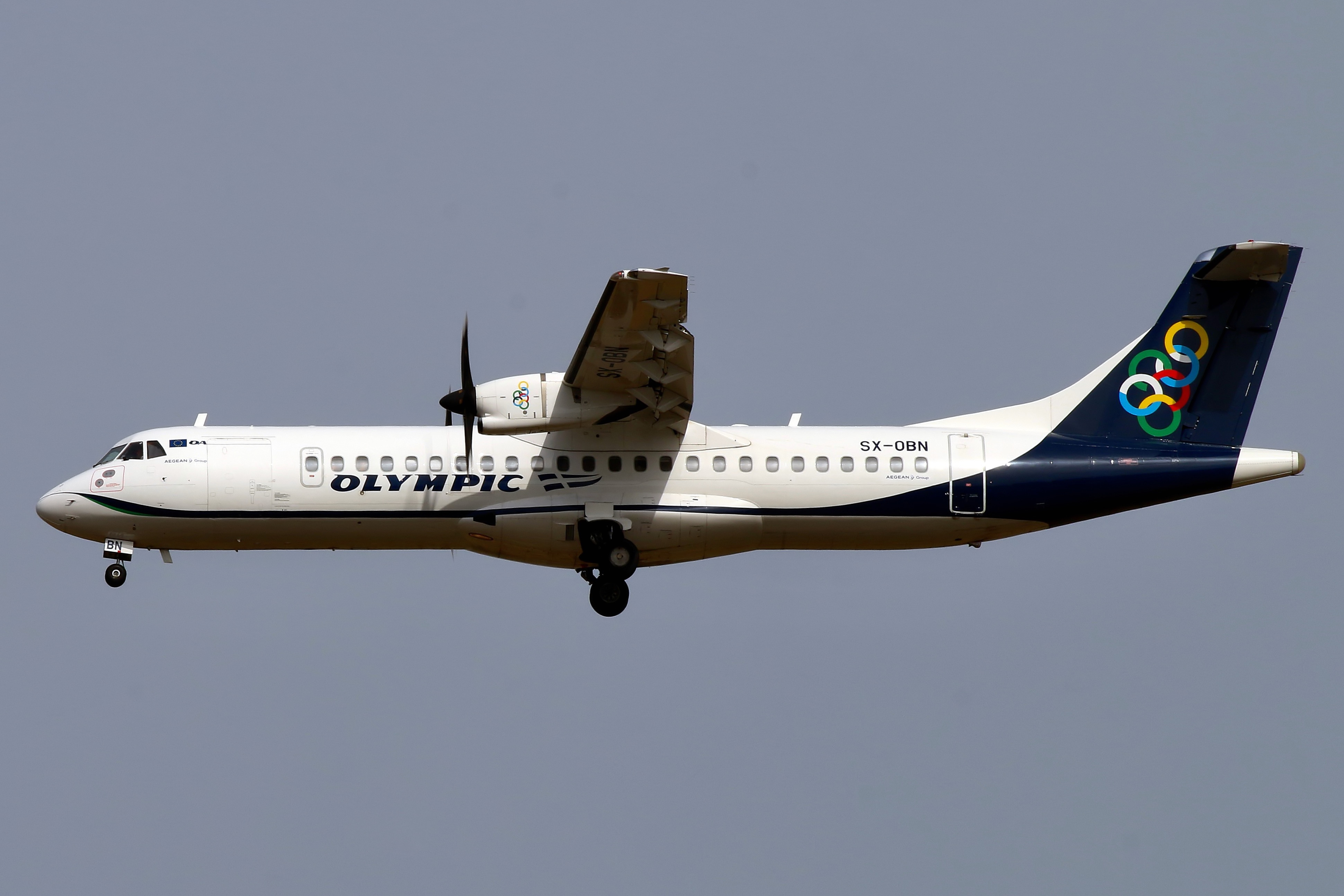
- Olympic Air ATR 72
IATA	ICAO	Call sign
OA	OAL	OLYMPIC
- Founded: 23 January 2006; 20 years ago
- Commenced operations: 29 September 2009; 16 years ago
- Hubs: Athens; Rhodes; Thessaloniki
- Frequent-flyer program: Miles+Bonus
- Alliance: Star Alliance (affiliate)
- Fleet size: 18
- Destinations: 28
- Parent company: Aegean Airlines
- Headquarters: Athens International Airport, Spata, Greece
- Key people: Eftychios Vassilakis (Chairman & CEO)
- Website: www.olympicair.com

Olympic Air S.A. (Greek: Ολυμπιακή) is a regional airline and a subsidiary of the Greek carrier Aegean Airlines. It was formed as part of the privatization of the former Greek national carrier Olympic Airlines, a company that carried the name Olympic Airways from 1957 to the beginning of the 21st century. Olympic Air commenced limited operations on 29 September 2009, after Olympic Airlines ceased all operations, the full-scale opening of the company taking place two days later on 1 October 2009. Its main hubs are Thessaloniki International Airport and Athens International Airport. Rhodes International Airport serves as a small secondary hub. The airline's headquarters are in Building 57 at Athens International Airport in Spata, and its registered seat is in Koropi, Kropia, East Attica.

The airline uses the IATA code OA that it inherited from Olympic Airlines, and the ICAO code OAL. The airline was launched using the ICAO code NOA, but has been reported to have bought the OAL code used by Olympic Airlines.

On 22 February 2010, Olympic Air and its main competitor Aegean Airlines announced they had reached an agreement to merge their operations, phasing out the Aegean brand. After an inquiry by the EU Directorate-General for Competition, it was announced on 26 January 2011 that the merger was blocked citing anti-competitive concerns. However, the sale to Aegean Airlines was approved by the EU Competition Commission on 10 October 2013, and the airline is now a subsidiary of Aegean Airlines. It operates 13 ATR 72, 3 ATR 42 aircraft and 2 Bombardier Dash 8, its former fleet of A320 and A319 aircraft having been sold during the various processes covered above.

== History ==
=== Pantheon proposal ===
On 16 September 2008, the Greek Government announced a major restructuring of Olympic Airlines, using the "Pantheon Airways" plan to relaunch Olympic as a private airline. Pantheon would operate parallel to Olympic Airlines until April 2009, when Olympic Airlines would be shut down and Pantheon would take over most of its routes. Pantheon would then be renamed using the "Olympic" brand name and its six-rings logo. The new Olympic Air would not be a legal successor to Olympic Airlines or Airways, taking up none of the former employees or assets directly.

In February 2009, an international tender concerning the sale of the three companies and the assets of the Olympic Airlines Group (Flight Operations, Technical Base, Ground Handling Operations) and Pantheon Airways collapsed, as the offers presented by the candidates were deemed not satisfactory by the government. After the collapse of this attempt to sell the company, former Transport Minister Kostis Hatzidakis extended an invitation to financial groups to proceed to direct negotiations for the sale of the Group. First to respond was the Marfin Investment Group (MIG), the largest investment fund of Greece, submitting an offer to buy the flight operations and technical base of the Group. Also, Swissport submitted an offer to buy the ground handling operations. After three weeks of negotiations with MIG, on 4 March 2009, Aegean Airlines and Greek-American consortium Chrysler Aviation, also submitted offers to buy the Group. However, Aegean Airlines' offer was not accepted as the new airline would control over 95% of domestic routes, while the government's financial advisors could not determine whether Chrysler Aviation was in the financial position to support its bid.

=== MIG era ===
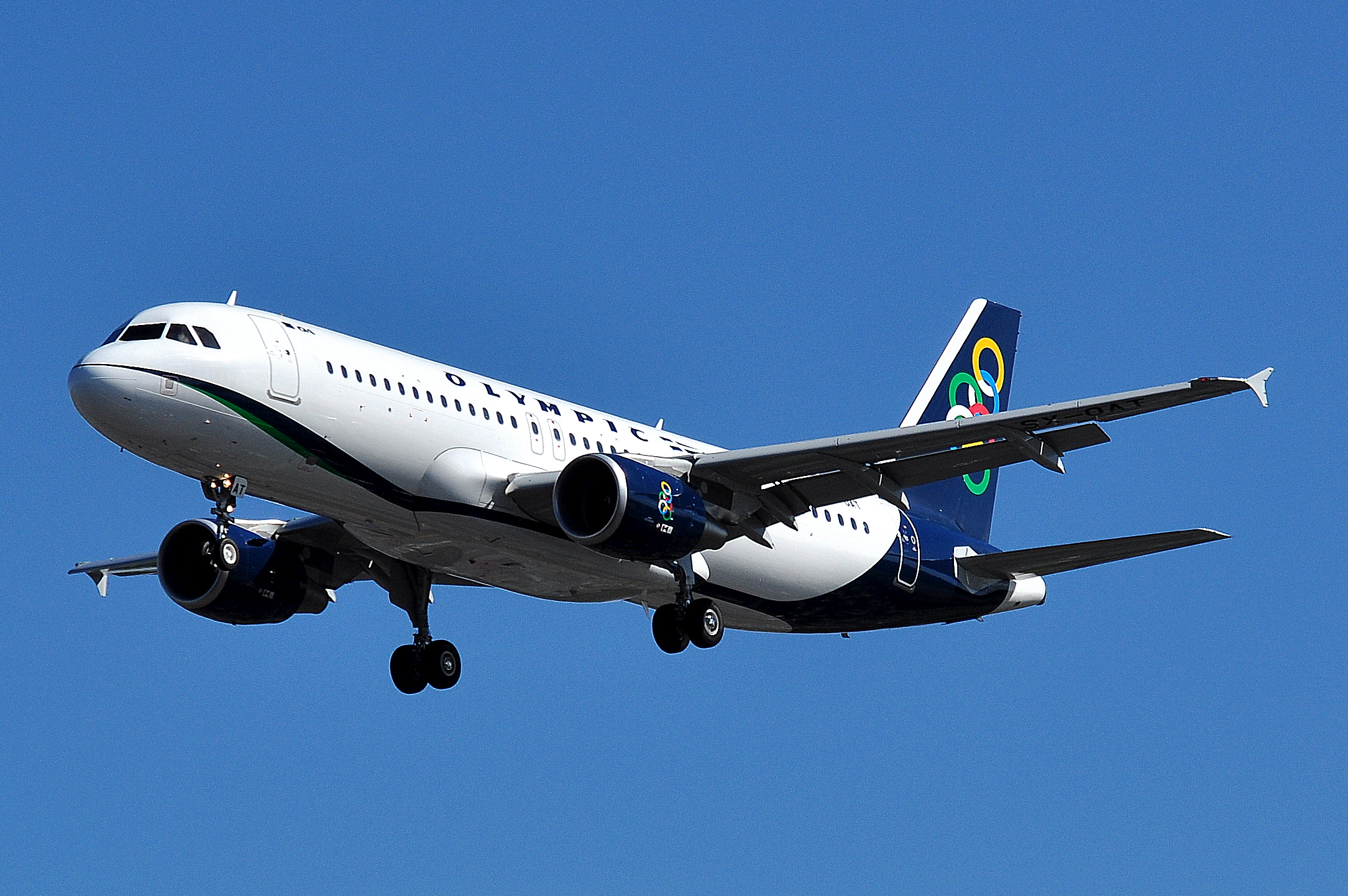
An Olympic Air Airbus A320-200

On 6 March 2009, Development Minister Kostis Hatzidakis announced the sale of the flight operations and the technical base companies to MIG. The negotiations with Swissport continued for another week, to facilitate a commercial agreement between MIG and Swissport. However, a deal was not reached and MIG announced it would take over Olympic's ground handling operations as well. The new owners planned to secure approximately 4,000 of the 8,500 jobs of the Group.

As part of its deal with the Greek state, MIG purchased the assets of Pantheon Airways, some of the valuable slots of Olympic Airlines in New York, London, Paris, Rome, Frankfurt, Brussels and Bucharest, as well as exclusive rights to the "Olympic" brand name and the six rings logo. It also acquired the right to use the two hangars, the cargo unit of Olympic Airways Services and other facilities at Athens International Airport for 25 years. The new airline planned to only retain 65% of the flight operations compared to Olympic's flight operations in summer 2008, in accordance to a rule imposed by the EU during the approval of the sale. It also had to give up its monopoly on the currently operated state-subsidized island routes, and equally share them with other Greek airlines.

Olympic Handling, as the new ground handling company is named, commenced its operations on 29 June, followed by the new technical base company, Olympic Engineering and finally, on 29 September, the new airline, officially renamed Olympic Air. The new name of the company was announced during a tender to modernize and redesign the logo of the new airline. This tender followed a previous one that called for fashion designers to submit their designs for the new uniforms of the airline. Shortly after the deal was struck, MIG announced the recruitment process for the three new companies, as well as new tenders for the acquisition or lease of new aircraft.

Olympic Air ordered eight new next-generation Bombardier Q400 during the 2009 Paris Air Show, four of which will be the Q400 NextGen, that are set to cover domestic and Balkan routes and will start being delivered in July 2010. OA also placed options on a further eight of the type. Olympic leased a total of 14 A320 series aircraft for its entry into service in September 2009, and plans to order its own aircraft from either from Airbus or Boeing in the near future.

In a press conference on 17 September 2009, MIG president Andreas Vgenopoulos, announced new code share deals, and stated that Olympic Air also has plans to join SkyTeam in the future. Vgenopoulos further stated that he wanted to make the company a regional leader, and later, one of the largest airlines in the world if possible. Olympic Air planned to employ around 5,000 staff, some of which include the 8,100 staff employed under the state carrier, with new negotiated contracts. Furthermore, Vgenopoulos stated the company would honor its commitment to give the new government three months to re-nationalize Olympic if it desired. Vgenopoulos also stated that a new aircraft order would be announced soon, to replace the current aircraft once their leases run out.

During the inaugural flight ceremony on 1 October 2009, MIG president Andreas Vgenopoulos stated that Olympic Air still holds the exclusive rights to the Macedonian Airlines brand name, and plans to re-launch the airline as a subsidiary of Olympic Air. The new subsidiary would be based out of Thessaloniki, with the purpose of serving the tourism and business needs of the region. The airline will begin operations in spring 2010.

In an October 2009 interview with ATWOnline, CEO Antonis Simigdalas stated that Olympic was now carrying around 10,000 passengers a day with a domestic market share of about 30 percent. Simigdalas further stated that the new Olympic Air was about 35 percent smaller than the old Olympic Airlines, and that Olympic Air is planning its own long-haul flights, within a time frame of 12 months. Regarding profitability, Simgdalas stated that with the current economic conditions, he expects Olympic Air to make its first profit in 2012. He further noted that the ground-handling unit was already profitable. In an interview with Flight International, Simigdalis stated that Olympic Air's domestic market share had grown to 47 percent by December 2009. He further stated that if things go well, he predicts the airline will break even in 2011.

On 6 December 2009, Olympic Air announced that it has been chosen as the official carrier of the Hellenic Olympic Committee for three years from 2010 to 2012. Through this sponsorship, Olympic Air has committed to providing free transportation of Greek Olympic delegations to the 2010 Winter Olympics in Vancouver and 2012 Summer Olympics in London. On 10 December 2009, the company announced that mobile phone check-in is now available for flights departing Athens Airport, making Olympic the first Greek airline to offer this service. As part of its corporate responsibility program, Olympic announced that it would launch an educational programme called "A Day at the Museum", transporting 3500 students from Cyprus to the new Acropolis Museum in Athens, starting from 29 January 2010.

In 2011, Olympic Air announced the start of a premium economy service on its fleet of Bombardier Q400 aircraft for domestic and selected international flights, in addition to its business class service.

=== Attempted merger with Aegean Airlines ===
In February 2010, initial shareholder discussions took place to consider co-operation between major competitor Aegean Airlines and Olympic Air fueling rumors of a possible merger. On 22 February 2010, Olympic Air and Aegean Airlines announced that they have agreed to a merger. The newly merged airline would carry the Olympic name and logo, after a transition period in which both airline brands would be used in parallel. The Aegean brand would cease to exist after the transition period. Furthermore, Olympic Ground Handling and Olympic Engineering would become 100 percent subsidiaries of the new company.

The sole shareholder of Olympic Air, Marfin Investment Group, and the main shareholder of Aegean, the Vassilakis Group, would have an equal shareholding of 26.6% in the combined entity, while the groups of Messrs Laskaridis, V. Constantakopoulos, G. David and L. Ioannou as well as Piraeus Bank would all maintain their proportional equity participation in the form of a 46.8% stake in the new company, thus giving Aegean a 73.4% stake overall in the new company. It was also announced that the new company would be listed on the Athens Stock Exchange. A decision on the merger was initially expected be given from the European Competitions Commission by the end of September 2010.

According to a press releases by Aegean and MIG, Aegean Chairman Theodoros Vassilakis and Olympic Chairman and CEO Andreas Vgenopoulos were expected to lead the new company. Vassilakis stated that the merger was brought on by the size of their competitors in the EU, which made it necessary for Greece's two main airlines to merge to create a "national airline champion" with enlarged presence in the European market as well as seamless coverage of even the most remote Greek islands. Vgenopoulos further stated that the merger also would preserve and strengthen the Olympic brand name, an inherent piece of Greek national tradition.

At the time of the merger announcement, Aegean was in the process of becoming a full Star Alliance member, while Olympic Air was forging ties with SkyTeam pre-merger. Despite this, it was announced that Aegean's Star Alliance process would continue with the airlines working to guarantee a smooth transition of the merged carrier into the Star Alliance. Star Alliance welcomed the proposed merger, releasing a statement stating "The integration teams from both sides will soon meet to assess the necessary steps, in order to guarantee a smooth transition of the merged Aegean Airlines and Olympic Air operations into the Star Alliance network". At Aegean's welcome ceremony into Star Alliance on 30 June 2010, Star Alliance CEO Jaan Albrecht future confirmed that the enlarged entity will be a full Star Alliance member if the planned merger wins regulatory approval.

After an initial review of the merger, on 30 July 2010, the European Competitions Commission expressed doubts that the merger meets competition regulations, citing "serious competition concerns" particularly in the domestic market but also on several international routes. The EC further stated that it had "serious doubts" the merger met requirements regarding ground-handling at Greek airports as well as the provision of Public service obligation routes, which would bring together the "two strongest and most credible bidders" of the PSO routes. The commission chose to open a 90-day in-depth inquiry into the proposed merger in order to further assess the effects of the partnership. The EC was expected to give their final ruling on the tie-up by 7 December 2010. In an interview with Air Transport World in August 2010, Dimitris Gerogiannis, managing director of Aegean Airlines, stated that their main goal at the time was making the merger work. He further went on to say that merging with Olympic Air is a matter of viability, driven by "economic and business realities". Gerogiannis claimed that Greece is unable to sustain two full-service airlines, pointing out other European countries and airlines as examples. Later than month, Aegean posted its first losses in years, further displaying an urgent need for the merger, while both airlines are planning various cuts.

Despite a given deadline of 7 December 2010, Olympic and Aegean were hoping for a decision from the EU earlier. The two airlines expected to hand over all details and documents to the EU as requested by the end of September 2010. Olympic and Aegean were hoping for an early decision in order to synchronize 2011 flight schedules, ideally by November 2010 as is the industry standard, in order to reap the benefits and synergies of the merger as soon as possible. The airlines claimed a later decision would hurt them economically and competitively against other airlines and delay full benefits from the merger until 2012.

On 24 September 2010, it was announced that Olympic Air had won the European Regions Airline Association Silver Award: Airline of the Year for 2010/2011. Olympic was praised for operating 190 daily flight within two months of starting operations, despite having been re-launched during an extreme economic crisis in Greece and against a backdrop of a troubled past. It was also mentioned how the airline's operation had brought Aegean Airlines to the negotiation table to agree to a merger within a short time frame.

On 21 October 2010, the EU commission announced that they would delay their decision on the merger until 12 January 2011. Commissioner Joaquin Almunia also cited difficulties with the two companies holding almost all the domestic market in Greece. Although a specific reason for the delay was not given, according to publications, the commission typically defers decisions when companies offer to take steps that would ease concerns. On 17 November 2010, Commissioner Joaquin Almunia confirmed that the two carriers still face some difficulties in their efforts to overcome antitrust concerns over the merger, but stressed that they still have weeks ahead of them to find an adequate solution until the planned 12 January 2011 decision. On 10 December 2010, it was reported by Greek media that the European commission had pushed back their ruling date, this time with a new tentative date being set for 2 February 2011.

On 26 January 2011, the European Commission blocked the merger between the two airlines, citing anti-competition concerns. The commission stated that the merger would have created a "quasi-monopoly" in Greece's air transport market, with the combined airline controlling more than 90% of the Greek domestic air transport market. The EC further stated its belief that the merger would lead to higher fares for four of the six million Greek and European passengers flying to and from Athens each year, with no realistic prospects that a new airline of sufficient size would enter the market to restrain the merged airline's pricing. Additionally, commissioner Joaquin Almunia stated that the merger would have led to higher prices and lower quality of service for Greeks and tourists traveling between Athens and the islands, where the merged airline would have near-total domination between Athens and Thessaloniki, and between the capital and eight island airports. Both carriers offered remedies in an attempt to ease concerns, though the EU believed that they would not be enough to protect travelers adequately and ease competition concerns. One of the remedies proposed by the companies, included offering to cede takeoff and landing slots at Greek airports, though the commission noted that Greek airports do not suffer from the congestion observed at other European airports in previous airline mergers or alliances.

EU competition commissioner Joaquín Almunia stated that the airlines could have won approval if they offered to sell part of their fleet to a potential competitor or let another airline use one of their brand names, per EU suggestions. Aegean Airlines called the brand-name proposal unacceptable, with vice-chairman Eftihios Vassilakis stating that the brand names have a great value which both airlines have worked hard to build. Furthermore, Vassilakis stated that the brand name and fleet remedy does not have a precedent in the history of airline mergers. Both airlines also stated that they will study the block report issued by the EU, and after careful analysis and discussion with their advisers, will decide whether to appeal.

=== Acquisition by Aegean Airlines ===
Following a shake-up of its board of directors, on 2 March 2011, Olympic Air announced that they planned to appeal the EU ruling with Aegean Airlines, and also announced route network changes as a part of their strategy adjustment, which included the cancellation of most of their western-European routes and additions of domestic and regional routes.

On 21 October 2012, Aegean Airlines announced that it had struck a deal to acquire Olympic Air for a sum of €75 million, pending approval by the European Commission. Contrary to their merger attempt, both carriers would continue to operate under separate brands after the acquisition. As part of the deal, Aegean Airlines paid Olympic Air €20 million up front. In the event that the European Commission did not approve the deal, Olympic Air would still retain the money, with Aegean Airlines owning a 17% stake in the company.

European Commission sources said that Aegean Airlines' second attempt to buy Olympic Air would be approved by the Commission; it was understood that Olympic Air would be forced into bankruptcy proceedings if the merger was not allowed to go ahead.

The buyout was approved by the European Commission on 9 October 2013. As of 1 February 2014, Olympic Air is a service provider for parent company Aegean Airlines, with all the international flights carrying the latter's flight prefix. The carrier continues to operate the domestic routes (some of them in co-operation with Aegean). Some Aegean international flights are operated by Olympic Air.

== Corporate affairs ==
=== Ownership ===
Olympic Air is 100% owned by Aegean Airlines, which bought the company for €72 million in cash, to be paid in installments. €20 million was paid on 22 October 2012 and the remainder was payable in 5 equal annual installments, the first of which was paid on 23 October 2013. The brands and logos of the two airline companies were expected to remain intact, with each one retaining distinct fleet and flight operations.

=== Business trends ===
Olympic Air had been loss-making since its creation in 2009 until its takeover by Aegean.

Although still operating as a separate brand, performance figures are fully incorporated within the Aegean Group results. Available financial and other trends for Olympic Air (for years ending 31 December) were:

	2009* Oct-Dec	2010	2011	2012	2013**	2014	2015	2016	2017	2018
Turnover (€m)	63.3	334.0	240.5	216.3	171.6	106.1	104.51	Figures now consolidated within Aegean Air		
Profit before tax (€m)	−81.2	−79.6	−38.6	−6.8	−12.7	23.12	18.27	Figures now consolidated within Aegean Air		
Net profit (€m)	−81.6	−80.9	−37.6	−8.6	−13.9	23.57	14.73	Figures now consolidated within Aegean Air		
Number of employees (at year end)	1,183	1,112	939	733	450	327	239	Figures now consolidated within Aegean Air		
Number of passengers (m)	1.0	4.3	3.4	2.9	2.0	0.5	0.675	Figures now consolidated within Aegean Air		
Passenger load factor (%)		64	63	63	68	62	64.3	Figures now consolidated within Aegean Air		
Number of aircraft (at year end)	32	29	24	19	15	14	14	14	12	12
Notes/sources										

(*The 2009 figures reflect the fact that the airline only commenced operations on 29 September 2009.)

(**The 2013 figures are for the full year, even though the acquisition by Aegean was completed on 23 October 2013, and Olympic figures for the last two months of the year have therefore been consolidated in the Aegean group results.)

=== Branding ===
The new company's logo was selected in an online vote, after an open invitation to designers. Visitors to a designated website could vote for their favourite logo among three bids. The logo designed by Giannis Papathanasiou and Panos Triantafillopoulos, heavily based on the logo of its predecessor company, Olympic Airlines, won the vote. The six rings are said to symbolise the five continents and Greece.

New uniforms were also selected in an online vote, after an open invitation to designers for Olympic Air flight attendants. Visitors to a dedicated website could vote for their favorite uniforms among three bids. OA flight staff now wear uniforms designed by Celia Kritharioti.

=== Travelair Club ===
Travelair Club (written as Travelair Club) was the frequent flyer programme of Olympic Air, launched in November 2009. Members could earn miles on Olympic Air and Delta Air Lines flights, car rentals and hotels. It consisted of three levels: Blue, Silver and Gold. All former Olympic Airlines Icarus Frequent Flyer Program members were offered a 3000 award mile bonus to become members of the Travelair Club. On 24 November 2014, Travelair Club was absorbed by Aegean Airlines's frequent flyer programme Miles+Bonus, with appropriate status matches. Migration of status and miles from the closed program was available until 1 June 2015.

== Codeshare agreements ==
Olympic Air used to have codeshare agreements with various carriers including Delta Air Lines, Etihad Airways, TAROM and KLM. All agreements were terminated when bought by Aegean Airlines. All flights operated by Aegean can be booked from Olympic Air's website while Aegean has placed its code in all PSO flights operated by Olympic Air. Olympic, by way of Aegean Airlines, is now an affiliate of Star Alliance.

Olympic Air codeshares with the following airlines:

- Aegean Airlines
- All Nippon Airways
- Scoot
- Singapore Airlines

== Fleet ==
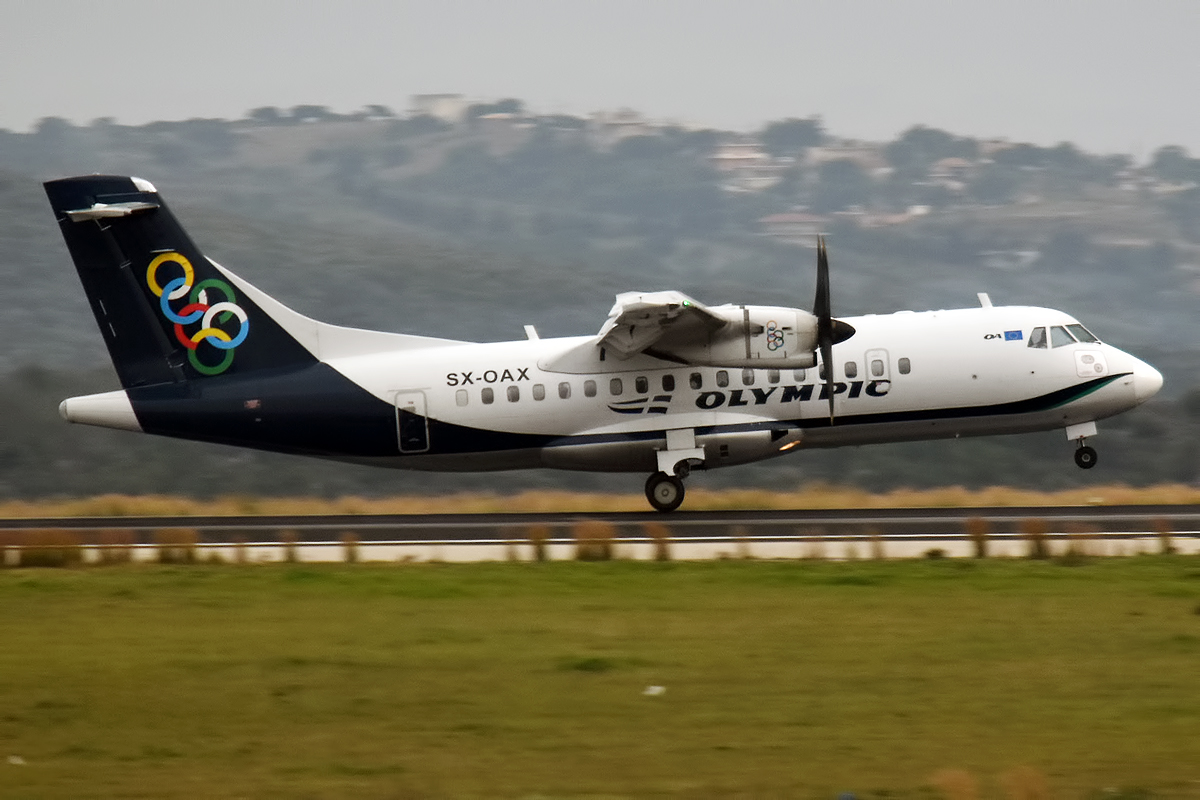
Olympic Air ATR 42-600, 2020

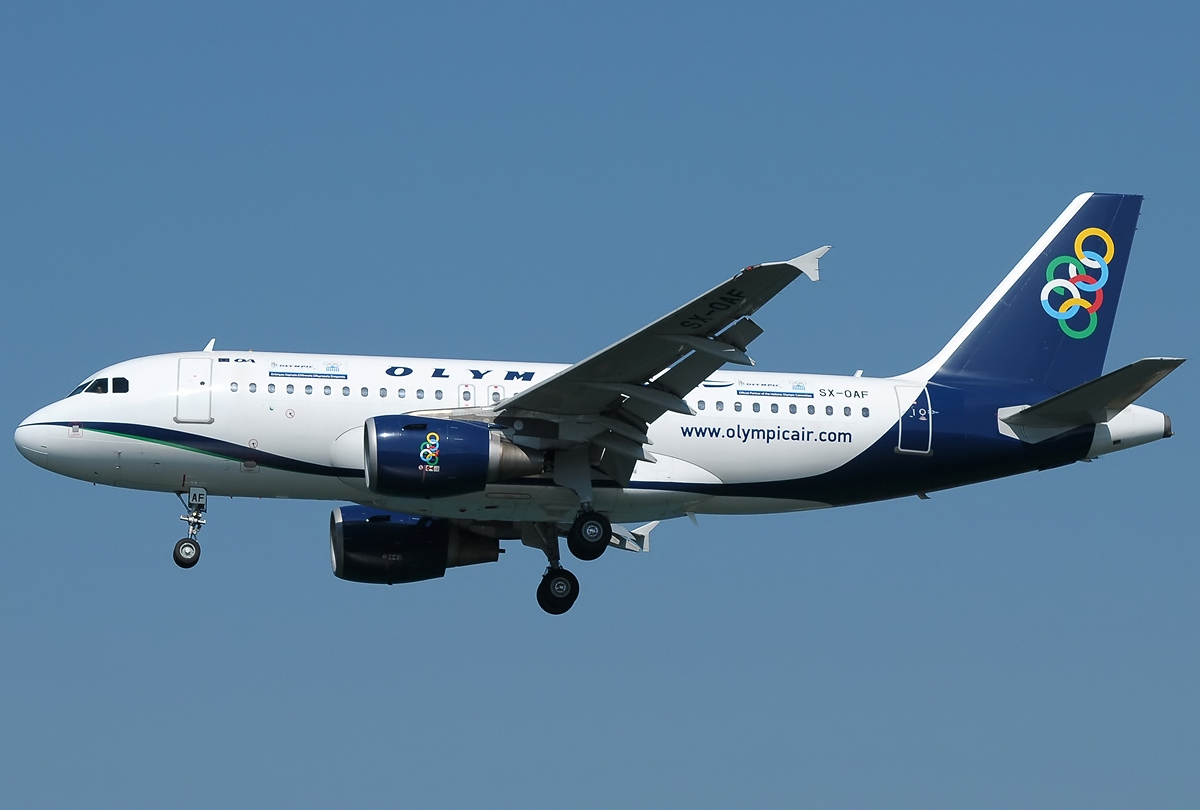
Olympic Air Airbus A319-112; this type was operated from 2009-2014

=== Current fleet ===
As of July 2026, Olympic Air operates the following aircraft:

Olympic Air fleet
Aircraft	In service	Orders	Passengers
ATR 42-600	3	—	46
ATR 72-600	13	2	72
DHC Dash 8-100	2	—	37
Total	18	2	

=== Fleet history ===
Olympic Air launched operations with a mix of Airbus A320 family jets and Bombardier Dash 8 aircraft. In March 2013, it was reported that the airline would retire its remaining Airbus aircraft effective immediately, though two A319s continued to operate selected domestic routes, mostly to Santorini and Alexandroupolis, until the end of the summer season. Most of Olympic Air's Airbus A320 family aircraft were transferred to parent company Aegean Airlines.

== Incidents and accidents ==
- On 14 January 2022, Olympic Air flight 024, an ATR 42-600 operating from Athens to Milos, skidded off the runway shortly after landing at Milos Airport amidst strong winds. None on board were injured. At the time of landing the strong winds pushed the plane resulting it to skid off the runway and ending up in the field adjacent to the runway.
