= Vlorë Air Base =

Vlorë Airport
- IATA: none; ICAO: LAVL

Summary
- Airport type: Public
- Serves: Vlorë
- Location: Albania
- Elevation AMSL: 3 ft / 1 m
- Coordinates: 40°28′35.6″N 19°28′26.3″E

Map
- Location of Vlorë Airport in Albania

Runways
| Direction | Length | | Surface |
| Direction | m | ft | Surface |
|---|---|---|---|
| 16/34 | 1,009 | 3,310 | GRASS |
- Source: Landings.com

Vlorë Air Base (ICAO: LAVL) is located near Vlorë, Albania. It was constructed in the 1950s.

== History ==
Vlorë is the second largest port in Albania, after Durrës. It was formerly the capital of Albania (a status held by Tirana since 1920), and was the city in which the country's Declaration of Independence was signed on November 28, 1912.

== History of Vlorë Base ==
The air base is situated south of the city of Vlorë. The city is on the Adriatic coast in the southern region of Albania. It was built in 1950s and is the home base of the Air Academy. The academy was established in 1962. In 1997, during the "lottery uprising", the air base was destroyed. The academy was rebuilt between 2002 and 2004, but the air base was not. Instead, civilian homes were built over the air base. During World War II, the air base was used by flying CR42s. It is 100 km away from Tirana.

== History of the Albanian Air Force ==
The Albanian Air Force would not have established itself in Vlorë without the assistance of the Soviet Union. Its first planes, the Yak-9 fighters, were donated by the Soviets. Many pilots undertook their training in the Yak-18 in the USSR before going to Yugoslavia for further training in the Yak-3 planes, after which they returned to Albania. The first pilot to fly in the Albanian forces was Petraq Polena, born in Korçë. In 1955, the Soviet Union supplied 2 squadrons of jet fighters and Mig-15UTI trainers. Some of the aircraft are still used by the Albanian Air Force today.

== Runways ==
- Main Runway: Rwy 16/34, Size: 2,813 ft × 195 ft (857 m × 59 m), Elev: 3 ft (0.91 m), N40 28 33.78 E019 28 27.04, grass airfield.

== Accidents and incidents ==
- On 16 August 1969, a Douglas DC-3 of Olympic Airways was hijacked on a domestic flight from Ellinikon International Airport, Athens, Greece to Agrinion Airport. The aircraft, possibly registered SX-BBF, landed at Vlorë.

== See also ==
- List of airports in Albania
