= Suère =

Automobile manufacturer

Automobiles J. Suère
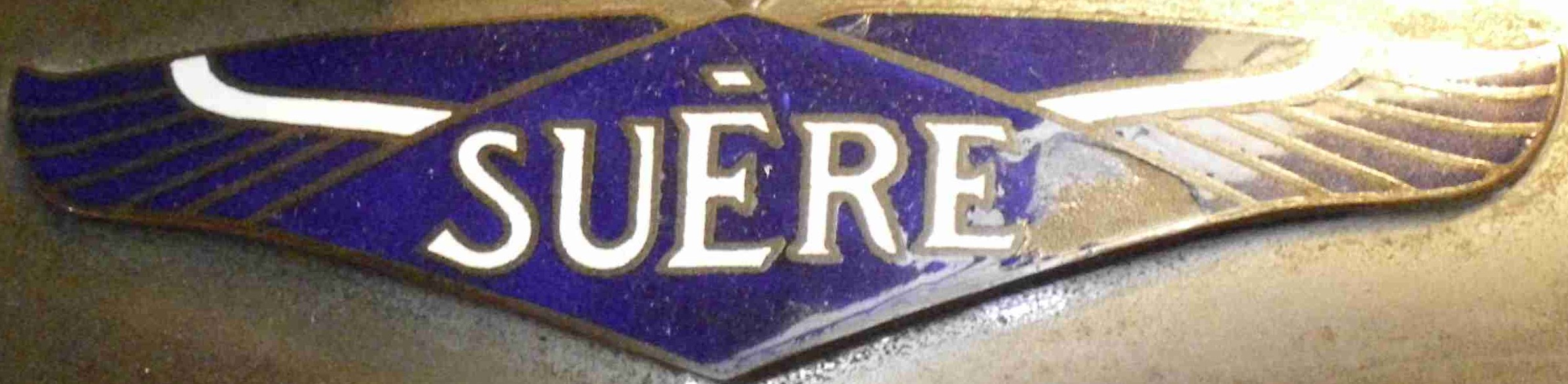

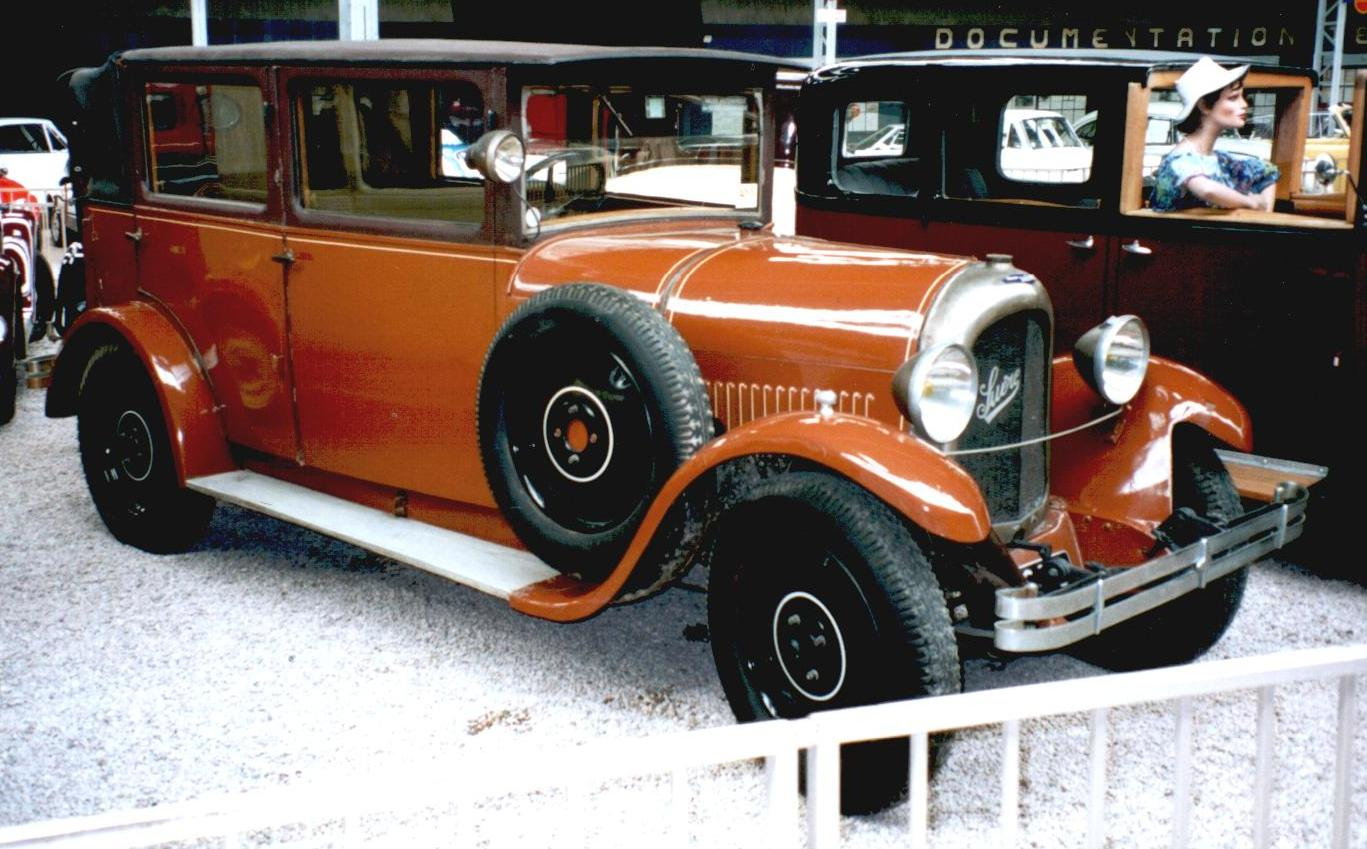
- Founded: 1905 (as an engine manufacturer); 1909 (as an automobile manufacturer)
- Defunct: 1931
- Headquarters: 12th arrondissement of Paris, France
- Products: Automobiles

Automobiles J. Suère was a French manufacturer of automobiles between 1909 and 1931.

== The business ==
The company was started in Paris manufacturing engines branded under the "Velox" name. Automobiles were added in 1909, and, following the war, continued to be produced in modest volumes till 1931.

== The cars ==
The first Suères were an 8CV with an engine capacity of 763cc and a 4-cylinder 10CV of 1592cc bought in from Ballot.

After the war the manufacturer announced an ambitious 1408 cc V8 engined car. The car sat on a 2,450 mm (96.5 in) wheelbase, and appeared at the 15th Paris Motor Show in October 1919 with a 2-seat "Torpedo" type body and a 17,500 franc manufacturer's price. Little more was heard of this car, however, and during the early 1920s the manufacturer focused on 4-cylinder models. At the Motor Show in October 1924 they were exhibiting their 4-cylinder "Type D" with 1843 cc and priced in bare chassis form at 14,100 francs. "Torpedo" bodied and "Landaulet" versions were also listed, respectively at 20,000 francs and 25,000 francs.

By the time of the 22nd Paris Motor Show in October 1928 Suère were listing three models, all of them powered by side-valve engines, as follows:

- Suère "8CV" 1.2-litre: wheelbase 2,600 mm (102.4 in)
  Prices: 4-seater "Torpédo", 17,000 francs; "Conduite intérieure" (saloon/sedan) 20,000 francs
- Suère "10CV" 1.85-litre: wheelbase 2,860 mm (112.6 in)
  Prices: 4-seater "Torpédo", 20,550 francs; "Conduite intérieure" (saloon/sedan) 28,000 francs
- Suère "14CV" 2.4-litre: wheelbase 3,350 mm (131.9 in)
  Prices: 7-seater "Torpédo", 20,200 francs

The final offering was the 3200cc straight-eight Model R of 1930, which never progressed beyond the prototype stage.

== Reading list ==
- Harald Linz, Halwart Schrader: Die Internationale Automobil-Enzyklopädie. United Soft Media Verlag, München 2008, ISBN 978-3-8032-9876-8.
- George Nick Georgano (Chefredakteur): The Beaulieu Encyclopedia of the Automobile. Volume 3: P–Z. Fitzroy Dearborn Publishers, Chicago 2001, ISBN 1-57958-293-1. (English)
- George Nick Georgano: Autos. Encyclopédie complète. 1885 à nos jours. Courtille, Paris 1975. (French)
