= Olympic Aviation Flight 545 =

1989 aviation accident

Coordinates: 37.7270°N 26.6210°E

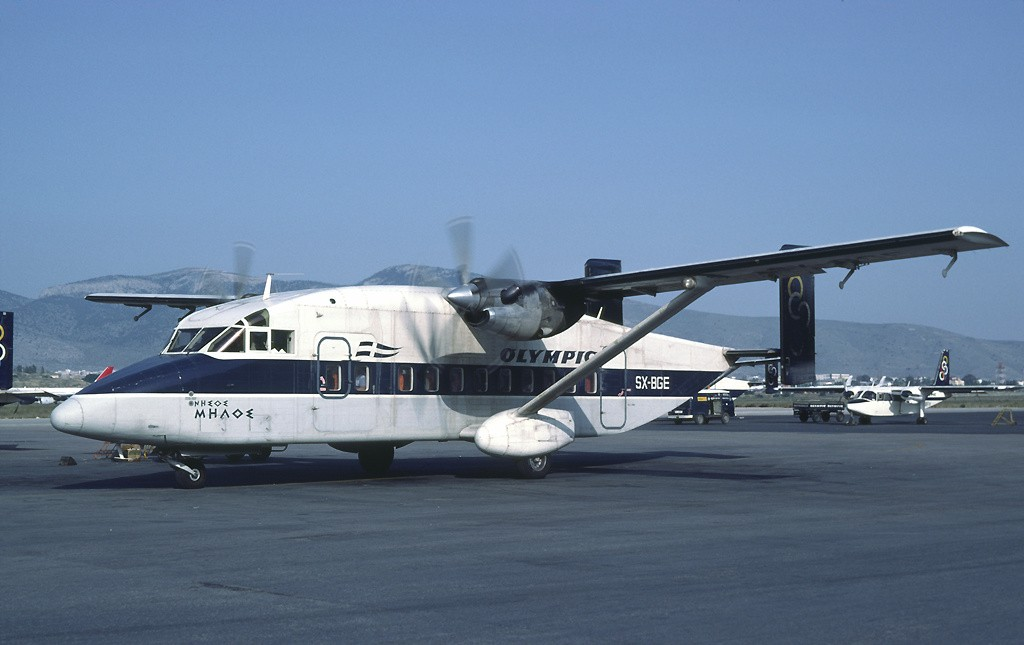
- SX-BGE, the aircraft involved in the accident

Accident
- Date: 3 August 1989
- Summary: Controlled flight into terrain due to pilot error
- Site: Mount Kerkis, Samos, Greece

Aircraft
- Aircraft type: Shorts 330-200
- Aircraft name: Isle of Milos
- Operator: Olympic Aviation
- Registration: SX-BGE
- Flight origin: Thessaloniki Airport
- Destination: Samos Airport
- Occupants: 34
- Passengers: 31
- Crew: 3
- Fatalities: 34
- Survivors: 0

On 3 August 1989, Olympic Aviation Flight 545, operated by a Shorts 330-200, crashed into a cloud-shrouded Mount Kerkis on Samos due to the pilots using visual flight rules in instrument meteorological conditions. All on board perished. This accident is the worst involving a Shorts 330.
