= Olympic Airways v. Husain =

- Supreme Court of the United States

Argued November 12, 2003 Decided February 24, 2004
- Full case name: Olympic Airways, Petitioner v. Rubina Husain, Individually and as Personal Representative of the Estate of Abid M. Hanson, Deceased, et al.
- Citations: 540 U.S. 644 (more) 124 S. Ct. 1221; 157 L. Ed. 2d 1146; 2004 U.S. LEXIS 1620; 72 U.S.L.W. 4187; 4 A.L.R. Fed. 2d 709; 17 Fla. L. Weekly Fed. S 139

Court membership
- Chief Justice William Rehnquist Associate Justices John P. Stevens · Sandra Day O'Connor; Antonin Scalia · Anthony Kennedy; David Souter · Clarence Thomas; Ruth Bader Ginsburg · Stephen Breyer

Case opinions
- Majority: Thomas, joined by Rehnquist, Stevens, Kennedy, Souter, Ginsburg
- Dissent: Scalia, joined by O'Connor (Parts I and II)
- Breyer took no part in the consideration or decision of the case.

Laws applied
- Warsaw Convention

Olympic Airways v. Husain, 540 U.S. 644 (2004), was a United States Supreme Court (SCOTUS) case related to Olympic Airways Flight 417. The case arose from the death on January 4, 1998, of Dr. Abid Hanson, a passenger on Olympic Airways Flight 417 from Cairo, Egypt, via Athens, Greece, to New York City in the United States. Hanson died following exposure to secondhand smoke.

Dr. Hanson, who had a "history of recurrent anaphylactic reactions" and sensitivity to secondhand smoke, had requested a non-smoking seat. When the family boarded the Boeing 747 aircraft in Athens, the family found that the assigned seats were three rows ahead of the economy-class smoking area; there was no partition between the smoking and non-smoking sections. The family repeatedly requested a seat farther away from the smoking section but the flight attendant, Maria Leptourgou, would not move the passenger to any of the eleven other unoccupied seats on the aircraft. Hanson felt a reaction to the smoke and died several hours later in-flight, despite a doctor's aid.

== Background ==
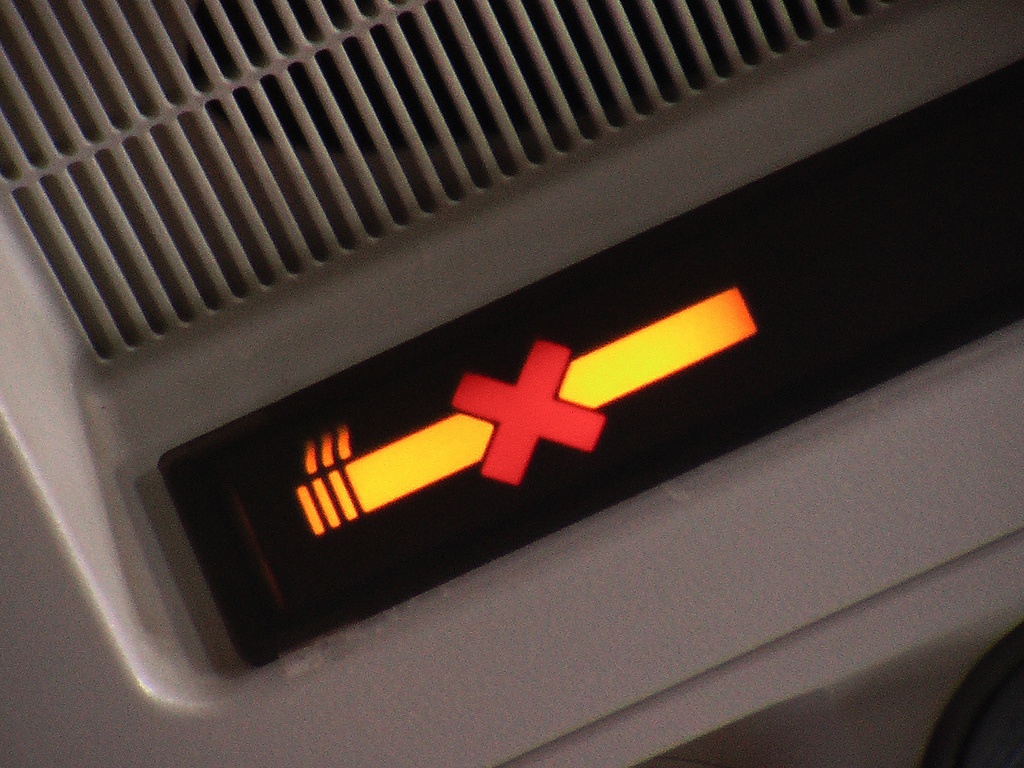
"No smoking" sign, as seen on most passenger flights worldwide

Smoking on international flights was already seen as a safety issue by the International Civil Aviation Organization's aviation medicine section, which had sought an outright ban by 1996.

Abid Hanson and his wife, Rubina Husain, were sitting in non-smoking seats on Olympic Airways Flight 417, but were very near the smoking section. Dr. Hanson was allergic to second-hand smoke. The couple's request to be moved was denied by the flight crew, and because of the inhalation of smoke during the flight, Dr. Hanson died. Rubina Husain filed suit in a California federal district court seeking damages under Article 17 of the Warsaw Convention. This Article allowed damages to be recovered by international air travelers for accidents that occur during a flight. Applying the statute from the Warsaw convention, the district court ruled that Mr. Hanson's death was an "accident" and awards Rubina Husain $1.4 million. This ruling was affirmed by the 9th Circuit Court of Appeals.

== Legal case ==
The Supreme Court of the United States decided the appeal in Olympic Airways v. Husain. Before the case reached the Supreme Court, the lower courts had decided as follows:

The District Court found petitioner liable for Dr. Hanson's death, and the Ninth Circuit affirmed, concluding that, under the definition in [Air France v. Saks, 470 U.S. 392 (1985)] of "accident," the flight attendant's refusal to re-seat Dr. Hanson was clearly external to him, and unexpected and unusual in light of industry standards, Olympic policy, and the simple nature of the requested accommodation.

On initial appeal, a three-judge panel of the United States Court of Appeals for the Ninth Circuit unanimously affirmed the finding of the District Court that Leptourgou's actions not only met the definition of "accident" under Article 17 of the Warsaw Convention, but also rose to the level of being "wilful misconduct" under Article 25; by passing that threshold, it removed a $75,000 cap on damages.

The Supreme Court affirmed the Court of Appeals award of US$700,000 in compensatory damages against Olympic Airways, holding that: "the conduct here constitutes an 'accident' under Article 17 of the Warsaw Convention."

== Question before the Court ==
The question before SCOTUS was whether a preexisting medical condition aggravated by airplane conditions can be considered an "accident" under the Warsaw Convention's Article 17, holding the airline responsible for the damages.

== Decision of the Supreme Court ==
In a 6-2 decision in favor of Husain, Justice Clarence Thomas delivered the opinion of the Court. The Court cited the decision in Air France v. Saks, which held that "any injury is the product of a chain of causes....some link in the chain was an unusual or unexpected event external to the passenger." Further, the flight attendant's refusal to allow the couple to change seats was the "link in the chain" that caused Dr. Hanson's death.

== See also ==
- Inflight smoking
