= Olympic Airways Flight 954 =

1969 airplane crash

Coordinates: 37°48′N 23°58′E

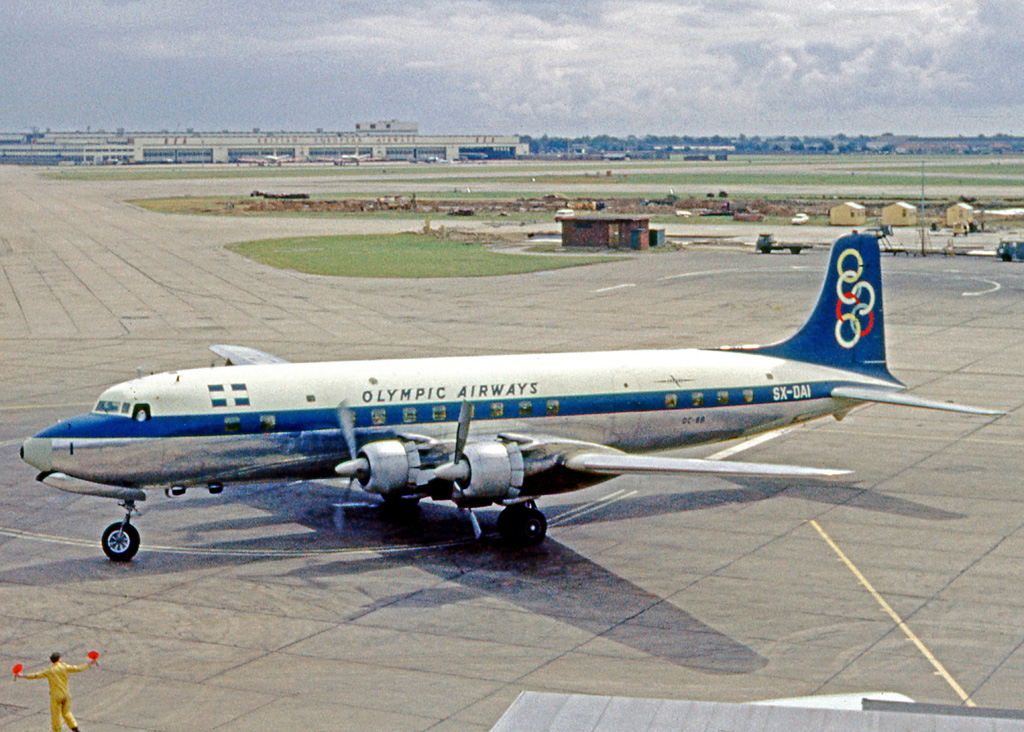
- A Olympic Airways DC-6, similar to the aircraft involved in the accident

Accident
- Date: December 8, 1969
- Summary: Controlled flight into terrain (CFIT)
- Site: Near Keratea, Greece

Aircraft
- Aircraft type: Douglas DC-6B
- Aircraft name: Isle of Corfu
- Operator: Olympic Airways
- Registration: SX-DAE
- Flight origin: Chania International Airport
- Destination: Athens-Ellinikon International Airport
- Occupants: 90
- Passengers: 85
- Crew: 5
- Fatalities: 90
- Survivors: 0

Olympic Airways Flight 954 was a Douglas DC-6B aircraft that crashed into a mountain near Keratea (approx. coordinates 37°48' N, 23°57' E), Greece, on December 8, 1969. All 85 passengers and 5 crew on board died in the crash.

== Crash ==
The flight was a domestic scheduled passenger service from Chania on the island of Crete to Athens. While on approach to Athens and with its undercarriage retracted, the aircraft struck Mount Paneio at an altitude of approximately 2,000 feet. The weather at the time of the crash was characterized by rain and high winds.

The crash of Flight 954 was the deadliest aviation accident in Greek history at the time it took place, a record it maintained until the crash of Helios Airways Flight 522 nearly thirty-six years later. It is the deadliest aviation accident involving a Douglas DC-6, and the deadliest crash in the history of Olympic Airways.

== Cause ==
It was ruled that the flight crew had deviated from the proper track and descended below the minimum safe altitude while making an ILS approach.
