= Macedonian Airlines =

Charter airline of Greece (1992–2003)

IATA	ICAO	Call sign
MC	MCS	MACAIR
- Founded: 1992
- Ceased operations: 12 December 2003
- Hubs: Athens–Ellinikon (1992—2001); Athens–Spata (2001—2003)
- Focus cities: Thessaloniki
- Frequent-flyer program: Icarus Frequent Flyer Program
- Fleet size: 3
- Parent company: Olympic Airlines
- Headquarters: Athens, Greece

Macedonian Airlines (Greek: Mακεδονικές Αερογραμμές, transliterated Makedonikes Aerogrammes) was a subsidiary of Olympic Airways, the former national flag carrier of Greece. The company ceased operations in 2003, when it took over the operations of Olympic Airways and was renamed Olympic Airlines.

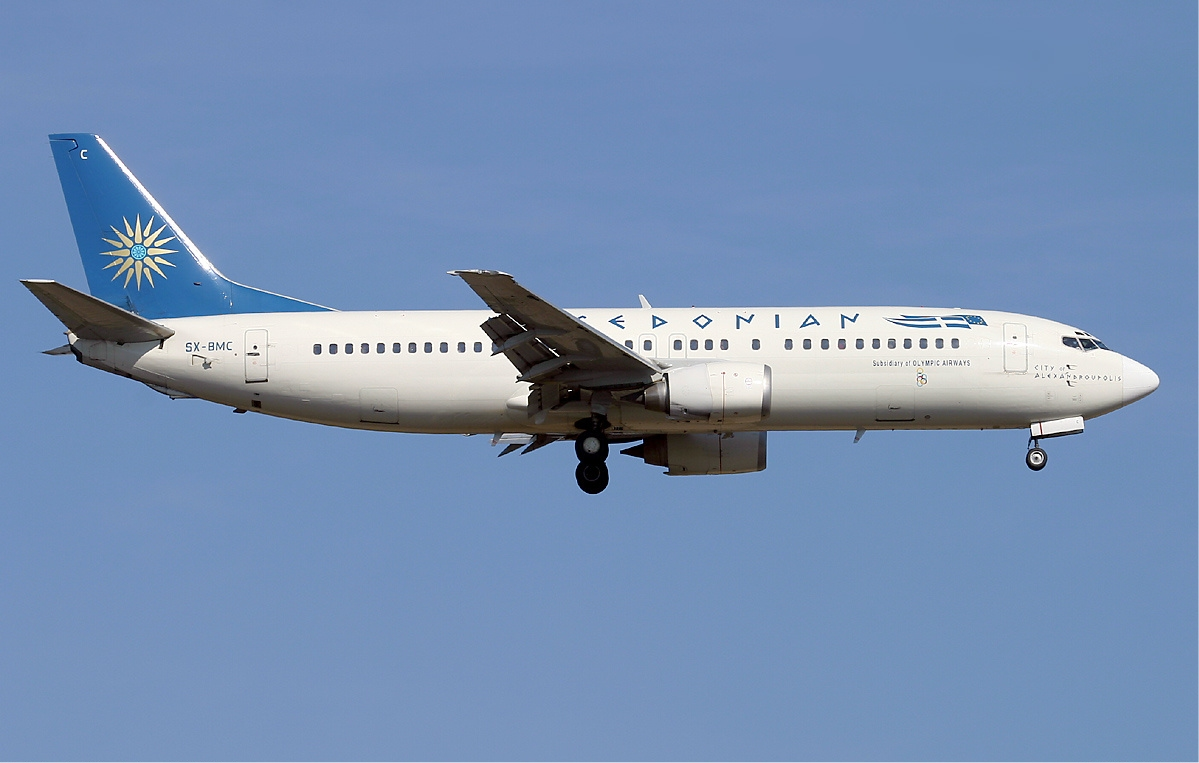
Macedonian Airlines (Olympic), Boeing 737-400, SX-BMC, 2003

== History ==
=== 1992–2003 ===
Macedonian Airlines was created in 1992 as the charter subsidiary of the Greek national airline, Olympic Airways. The Olympic Airways management board decided to rename the charter subsidiary of the Group, Olympic AirTours in 1992, and the Macedonian Airlines brand name was created. The company had nothing to do with MAT Macedonian Airlines, which was founded two years later, in 1994, in neighbouring Republic of North Macedonia.

Macedonian followed the trails of its predecessor, Olympic AirTours, mainly for vacation planning until 1998. This year the airline acquired two B727-200 from Olympic Airways. Starting with these aircraft, Macedonian offered charter flights of the Greek islands and the mainland abroad European. The society had reached agreements with different large tour operators. One year later, in 1999, the airline used new aircraft, by leasing two B737-400 to replace the already aged Boeing 727s. Since the company was an Olympic Airways subsidiary, all maintenance and handling were operated by the parent company, Olympic Airways.

Until 2003, Macedonian's fleet was also used on OA scheduled services, especially after the older Boeing 737-200s were phased out. In July 2003, the company leased two McDonnell Douglas MD-82 that also used on charter flights. On 12 December 2003, due to the mounting problems of the Olympic Airways Group, a restructuring plan was formed. Macedonian Airlines was separated from the Group, renamed Olympic Airlines and took over all the data and flight operations of Olympic Airways (including the IATA and ICAO codes).

== Former fleet ==
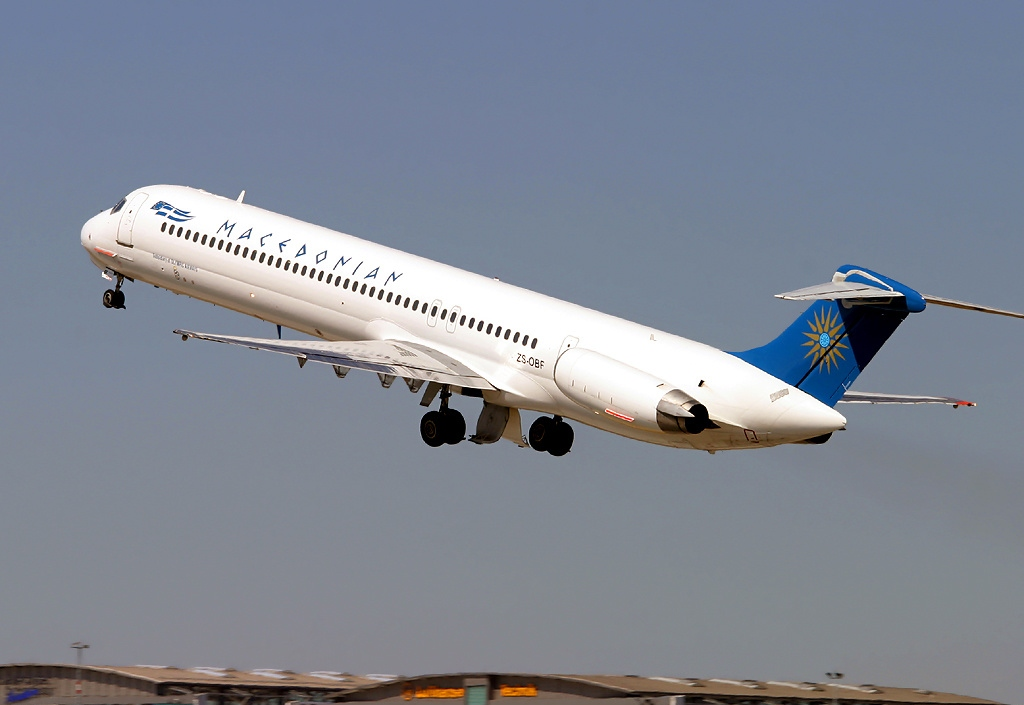
Macedonian Airlines (Olympic), McDonnell Douglas MD-82, ZS-OBF, leased from Safair, 2003

Macedonian Airlines Fleet
Aircraft	Operated	In Service	Notes
Boeing 727-200	4	1998	Two were leased from Aviogenex
Boeing 737-400	4	1999
McDonnell Douglas MD-82	2	2003	Both leased from Safair
Total	10	-
