= Agrinion Airport =

Agrinio Airport Αεροδρόμιο Αγρινίου
- IATA: AGQ; ICAO: LGAG

Summary
- Airport type: Military
- Location: Agrinio, Aetolia-Acarnania, Greece
- Elevation AMSL: 154 ft / 47 m
- Coordinates: 38°36′07″N 021°21′04″E
- Interactive map of Agrinio Airport

Runways
Direction	Length		Surface
Direction	m	ft	Surface
09/27	3,010	9,875	Asphalt

Agrinio Airport (Greek: Αεροδρόμιο Αγρινίου) (IATA: AGQ, ICAO: LGAG) is an inactive military air base in Agrinio, a city in the regional unit of Aetolia-Acarnania in Greece. As of 2023, the Hellenic [AIP] reports it with "airport operation is suspended".

Civil aviation in the area is served by smaller aerodrome at Dhokimion.
