= List of Lauda destinations =

Lauda operated to the following destinations as of June 2020, when all Lauda flights were changed to be operated as a wetlease under Ryanair flight numbers.

== List ==
Country	City	Airport	Notes	Refs
Austria	Graz	Graz Airport	Terminated	
Austria	Innsbruck	Innsbruck Airport	Seasonal	
Austria	Linz	Linz Airport	Terminated	
Austria	Salzburg	Salzburg Airport	Seasonal	
Belgium	Brussels	Brussels South Charleroi Airport		
Bosnia and Herzegovina	Banja Luka	Banja Luka International Airport		
Bulgaria	Burgas	Burgas Airport	Seasonal	
Bulgaria	Sofia	Sofia Airport		
Croatia	Zagreb	Zagreb Airport		
Croatia	Pula	Pula Airport	Seasonal	
Croatia	Split	Split Airport	Seasonal	
Croatia	Zadar	Zadar Airport	Seasonal	
Cyprus	Larnaca	Larnaca International Airport		
Cyprus	Paphos	Paphos International Airport	Terminated	
Denmark	Copenhagen	Copenhagen Airport		
Estonia	Tallinn	Tallinn Airport		
Finland	Helsinki	Helsinki Airport		
Finland	Lappeenranta	Lappeenranta Airport		
France	Bordeaux	Bordeaux–Mérignac Airport		
France	Marseille	Marseille Provence Airport		
France	Nice	Nice Côte d'Azur Airport		
France	Paris	Beauvais–Tillé Airport		
Germany	Berlin	Berlin Tegel Airport	Terminated	
Germany	Cologne	Cologne Bonn Airport		
Germany	Düsseldorf	Düsseldorf Airport	Base	
Germany	Frankfurt	Frankfurt Airport		
Germany	Hanover	Hannover Airport	Seasonal	
Germany	Munich	Munich Airport	Seasonal	
Germany	Münster; Osnabrück	Münster Osnabrück Airport		
Germany	Nuremberg	Nuremberg Airport	Seasonal	
Germany	Stuttgart	Stuttgart Airport	Base	
Greece	Athens	Athens International Airport		
Greece	Chania	Chania International Airport	Seasonal	
Greece	Corfu	Corfu International Airport	Seasonal	
Greece	Heraklion	Heraklion International Airport	Seasonal	
Greece	Kalamata	Kalamata International Airport	Seasonal	
Greece	Kefalonia	Kephalonia International Airport	Seasonal	
Greece	Kos	Kos International Airport	Seasonal	
Greece	Rhodes	Rhodes International Airport	Seasonal	
Greece	Santorini	Santorini (Thira) International Airport	Seasonal	
Greece	Skiathos	Skiathos International Airport	Seasonal	
Greece	Thessaloniki	Thessaloniki Airport		
Hungary	Budapest	Budapest Ferenc Liszt International Airport		
Ireland	Dublin	Dublin Airport		
Israel	Tel Aviv	Ben Gurion Airport		
Italy	Alghero	Alghero–Fertilia Airport	Seasonal	
Italy	Bari	Bari Karol Wojtyła Airport	Terminated	
Italy	Bergamo	Orio al Serio International Airport		
Italy	Bologna	Bologna Guglielmo Marconi Airport		
Italy	Brindisi	Brindisi Airport	Seasonal	
Italy	Catania	Catania–Fontanarossa Airport		
Italy	Lamezia Terme	Lamezia Terme International Airport	Seasonal	
Italy	Milan	Milan Malpensa Airport		
Italy	Naples	Naples International Airport		
Italy	Pisa	Pisa International Airport	Seasonal	
Italy	Rimini	Federico Fellini International Airport	Seasonal	
Italy	Rome	Leonardo da Vinci–Fiumicino Airport		
Italy	Treviso	Treviso Airport		
Italy	Verona	Verona Villafranca Airport		
Jordan	Amman	Queen Alia International Airport		
Latvia	Riga	Riga International Airport		
Lebanon	Beirut	Beirut–Rafic Hariri International Airport		
Lithuania	Vilnius	Vilnius Airport		
Malta	Valletta	Malta International Airport		
Montenegro	Podgorica	Podgorica Airport		
Morocco	Agadir	Agadir–Al Massira Airport		
Morocco	Marrakesh	Marrakesh Menara Airport		
Netherlands	Eindhoven	Eindhoven Airport		
Norway	Sandefjord	Sandefjord Airport, Torp		
Poland	Kraków	Kraków John Paul II International Airport		
Portugal	Faro	Faro Airport		
Portugal	Lisbon	Lisbon Airport		
Portugal	Porto	Porto Airport		
Romania	Bucharest	Henri Coandă International Airport		
Spain	Alicante	Alicante–Elche Airport		
Spain	Barcelona	Barcelona–El Prat Airport		
Spain	Fuerteventura	Fuerteventura Airport		
Spain	Ibiza	Ibiza Airport	Seasonal	
Spain	Lanzarote	Lanzarote Airport		
Spain	Las Palmas	Gran Canaria Airport		
Spain	Madrid	Adolfo Suárez Madrid–Barajas Airport		
Spain	Málaga	Málaga Airport		
Spain	Seville	Seville Airport		
Spain	Tenerife	Tenerife South Airport		
Spain	Valencia	Valencia Airport		
Spain	Palma de Mallorca	Palma de Mallorca Airport	Base	
Sweden	Gothenburg	Göteborg Landvetter Airport		
Sweden	Stockholm	Stockholm Skavsta Airport		
Switzerland; France; Germany	Basel; Mulhouse; Freiburg	EuroAirport Basel Mulhouse Freiburg	Seasonal	
Switzerland	Zürich	Zurich Airport	Terminated	
Ukraine	Kyiv	Boryspil International Airport		
United Kingdom	Birmingham	Birmingham Airport	Terminated	
United Kingdom	Bristol	Bristol Airport	Terminated	
United Kingdom	Edinburgh	Edinburgh Airport	Terminated	
United Kingdom	Liverpool	Liverpool John Lennon Airport	Terminated	
United Kingdom	London	London Stansted Airport	Terminated	
