= Bari Karol Wojtyła Airport =

International airport serving Bari, Italy

Bari Karol Wojtyła Airport Aeroporto di Bari "Karol Wojtyła"

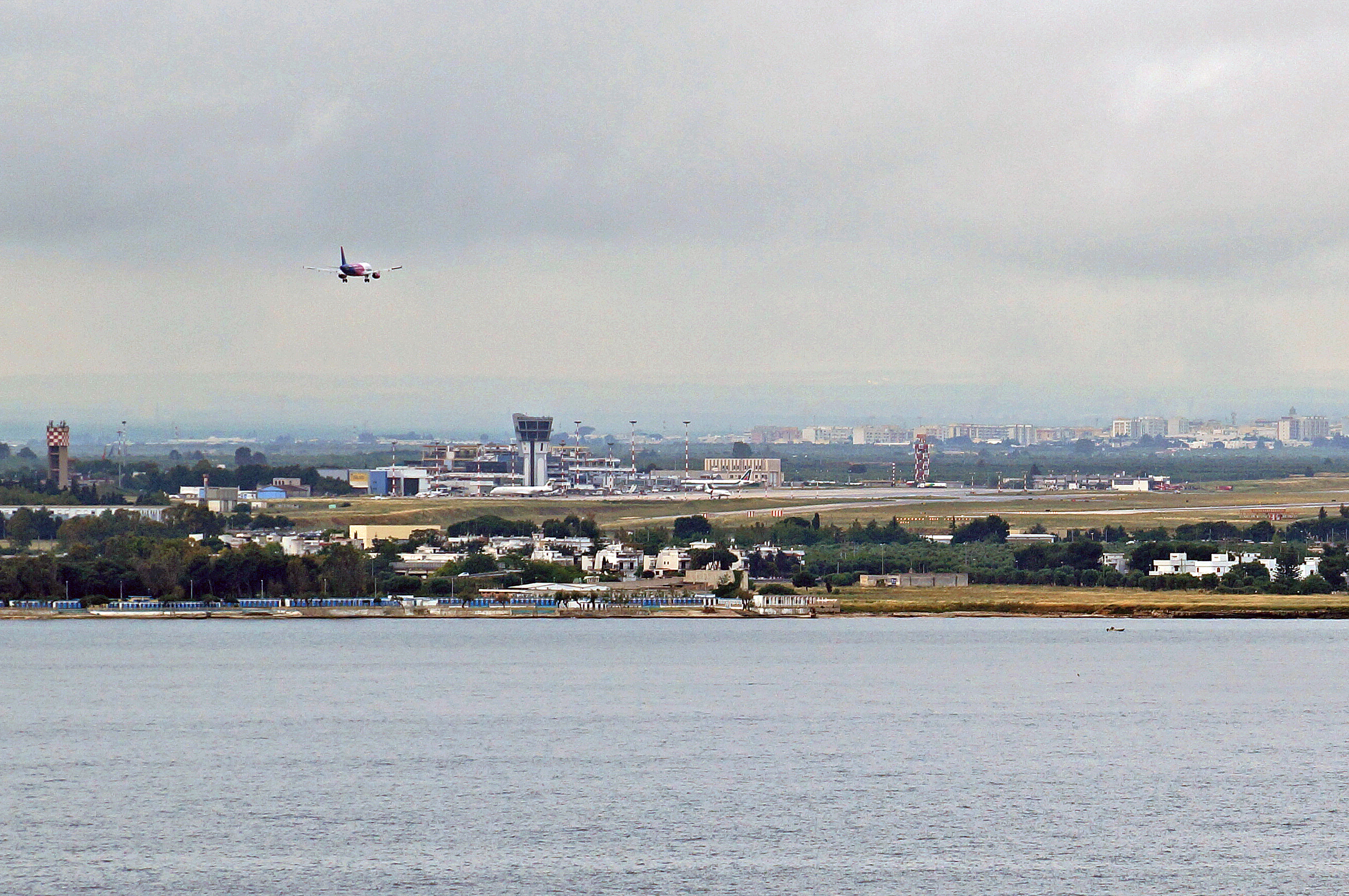
- IATA: BRI; ICAO: LIBD

Summary
- Airport type: Public/Civil/Military
- Operator: Aeroporti di Puglia
- Serves: Bari; Metropolitan City of Bari; Apulia region
- Focus city for: Ryanair; Volotea
- Elevation AMSL: 187 ft (57 m)
- Coordinates: 41°08′19.88″N 16°45′38.14″E
- Website: aeroportidipuglia.it

Map
- Location of the airport in Italy BRI (Italy)

Runways
Direction	Length		Surface
Direction	ft	m	Surface
07/25	9,842	3,000	Asphalt

Statistics (2025)
- Passengers: 7,977,881
- Passenger change 24-25: ▲9.7%
- Movements: 56,700
- Movements change 24-25: ▲4.4%
- Cargo (tons): 2,005
- Cargo change 24-25: ▼13.5%
- Source: Statistics from Assaeroporti

Bari Karol Wojtyła Airport (Italian: Aeroporto di Bari-Karol Wojtyła) (IATA: BRI, ICAO: LIBD) is an airport serving the city of Bari in Italy. It is approximately 8 km (5 mi) northwest from the city centre. Named after Pope John Paul II (1920–2005), who was born Karol Wojtyła. The airport is also known as Palese Airport (Italian: Aeroporto di Bari-Palese) after a nearby neighbourhood. The airport handled 6,461,179 passengers in 2023.

== History ==
=== Early years ===
The airport of Bari was originally a military airfield, built in the 1930s, by the Regia Aeronautica. During World War II Italian Campaign, it was seized by the British Eighth Army in late September 1943, and turned into an Allied military airfield. Until the end of the war in May 1945, it was used by the Royal Air Force and the United States Army Air Forces Twelfth and Fifteenth Air Forces both as an operational airfield as well as a command and control base. In addition, the airfield was used by the Italian Co-Belligerent Air Force (Aviazione Cobelligerante Italiana, or ACI), or Air Force of the South (Aeronautica del Sud), and the Balkan Air Force. After the war, it was turned over to the postwar Air Force of the Italian Republic (Aeronautica Militare Italiana).

In the 1960s, it was opened to civil flights and Alitalia schedules regular flights to Rome, Catania, Palermo, Ancona, Venice. The routes were later taken over by ATI, using a Fokker F27 airplane. When ATI put into operation the new DC-9-30 it became necessary to create a new runway, while the military complex was still used as passenger terminal.

In 1981, a new building was completed, originally intended to be used as a cargo terminal, but it became in fact the airport's new passenger terminal.

=== Development since the 1990s ===
In 1990, with the 1990 FIFA World Cup, the runway was extended and the terminal was upgraded, going through a further renovation in 2000. However, the traffic increase showed the infrastructural limitations of the airport and in 2002 the founding stone of the new passenger terminal was laid out. At the same time, flight infrastructures (aircraft parking areas, runway etc.) were upgraded. In 2005, the new terminal was completed and opened to passengers.

In 2005, construction works for a new control tower began and they were completed the following year. In 2006, a further extension of the runway was begun, and in 2007, the planning of an extension of the passenger terminals was commissioned. They were upgraded in 2005–2006 with the opening of a new passenger terminal equipped with four jet bridges and a multistorey car park.

== Airlines and destinations ==
The following airlines operate regular scheduled, seasonal, and charter flights to and from Bari:

Airlines	Destinations
Aegean Airlines	Seasonal: Athens
Air Cairo	Sharm El Sheikh
Air Dolomiti	Munich
Air France	Seasonal: Paris–Charles de Gaulle
Air Montenegro	Podgorica (begins 17 December 2026)
Air Serbia	Belgrade
Austrian Airlines	Seasonal: Vienna
British Airways	Seasonal: London–Gatwick
Discover Airlines	Seasonal: Frankfurt
easyJet	Milan–Malpensa, London–Gatwick, Nice; Seasonal: Basel/Mulhouse, Bristol, Geneva,, Lyon, Manchester,, Paris–Charles de Gaulle, Paris–Orly
Edelweiss Air	Seasonal: Zurich
Eurowings	Seasonal: Cologne/Bonn, Düsseldorf, Hamburg, Stuttgart
Iberia	Seasonal: Madrid
Israir	Tel Aviv
ITA Airways	Milan–Linate, Rome–Fiumicino
Lufthansa	Frankfurt, Munich
Luxair	Luxembourg
Neos	Seasonal: Sharm El Sheikh
Norwegian Air Shuttle	Seasonal: Copenhagen, Oslo, Stockholm–Arlanda
Ryanair	Athens, Bergamo, Berlin (ends 24 October 2026), Bologna, Bratislava, Bucharest–Băneasa, Brussels-Charleroi, Budapest, Cagliari, Catania, Frankfurt-Hahn, Genoa, Karlsruhe/Baden-Baden, Katowice, Kraków, Linz, London–Stansted, Madrid, Málaga, Malta, Marseille, Milan–Malpensa, Palermo, Paris-Beauvais, Pisa, Prague, Rome–Fiumicino, Sofia, Tirana, Toulouse, Trieste, Turin, Valencia, Venice, Verona, Vienna, Warsaw–Modlin, Weeze; Seasonal: Alghero, Alicante, Bristol, Dublin, Dubrovnik, Edinburgh, Friedrichshafen (begins 30 March 2027), Girona, Ibiza, Kaunas, Leeds/Bradford (begins 30 March 2027),Nuremberg, Porto, Poznań, Rhodes, Seville, Oslo (begins 28 March 2027),Skiathos Trapani, Zadar
Scandinavian Airlines	Seasonal: Copenhagen
Sky Alps	Seasonal: Mostar
Transavia	Amsterdam; Seasonal: Brussels, Nantes, Paris–Orly
Turkish Airlines	Istanbul
United Airlines	Seasonal: Newark
Volotea	Seasonal: Athens, Bilbao, Bordeaux, Corfu, Heraklion, Kefalonia, Lille, Lyon, Málaga, Mykonos, Olbia, Preveza, Santorini, Split, Zakynthos
Vueling	Barcelona
Wizz Air	Bucharest–Otopeni, Budapest, Skopje, Sofia, Timișoara, Tirana, Warsaw–Chopin, Yerevan; Seasonal: Cluj-Napoca, Craiova, Wrocław

== Ground transportation ==
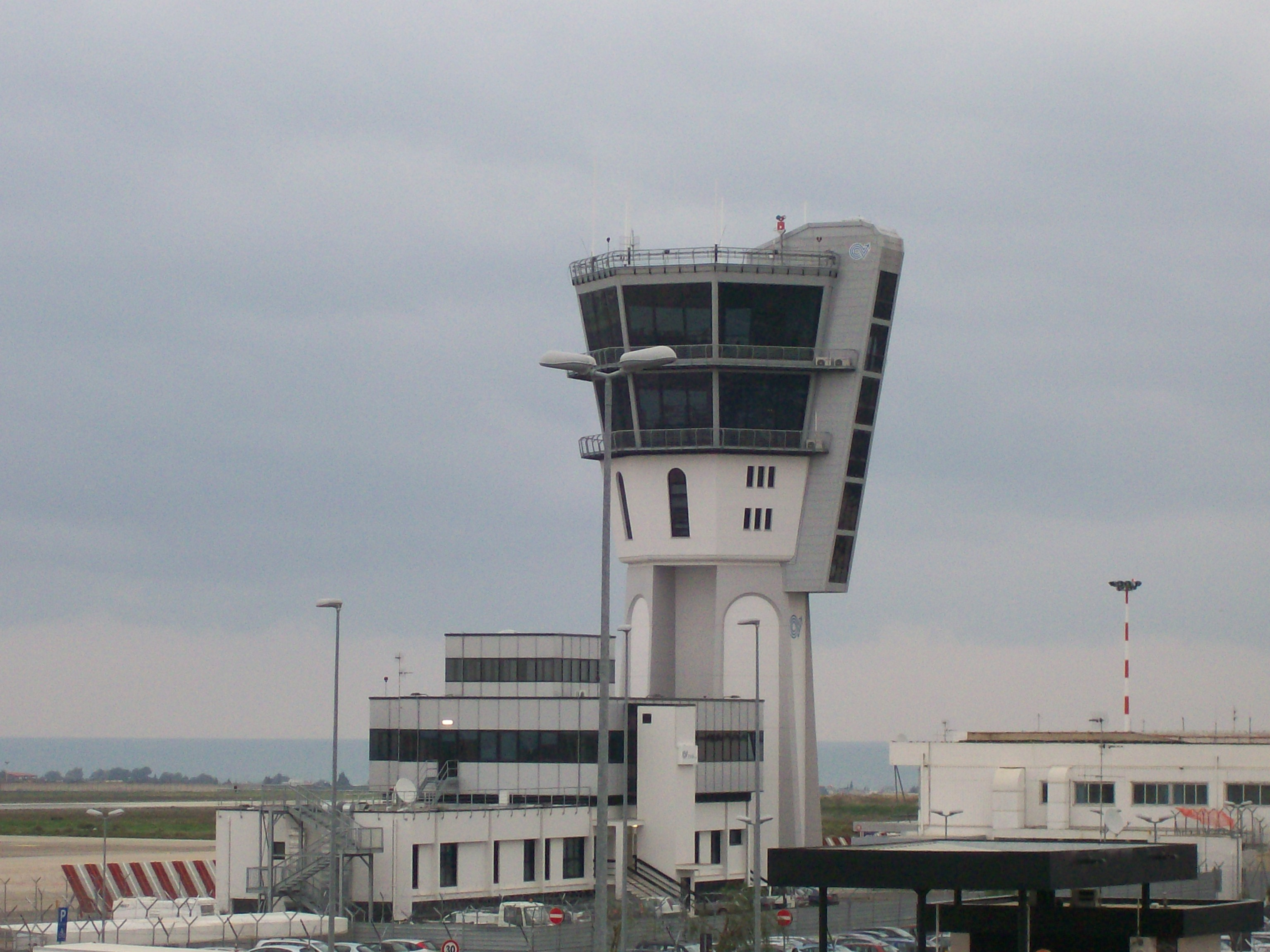
Control tower

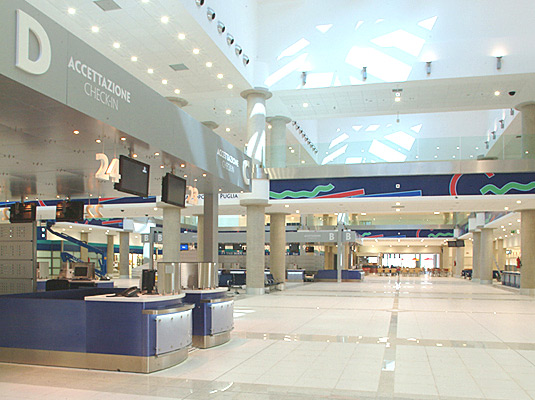
Departure area

=== Road ===
The airport can be reached by the ring road of Bari and from the A14 motorway.

=== Rail ===
The Bari metropolitan railway service connects the airport with the Bari Centrale railway station in the city centre.

=== Bus ===
AMTAB buses provide public transportation to the airport from the city centre (Line 16). Pugliairbus is a seasonal bus transportation service which operates interconnection service with Brindisi and Foggia airports. Pugliairbus also reaches touristic locations.

Tempesta autoservizi also offers a shuttle between the airport and city centre.

== See also ==
- Kraków John Paul II International Airport
- João Paulo II Airport Ponta Delgada (Azores)
- List of airports in Italy
- Brindisi Airport
- Port of Brindisi
