= Tympaki Airport =

Tympaki Airport Αεροδρόμιο Τυμπακίου
- IATA: none; ICAO: LGTY

Summary
- Airport type: Military
- Operator: Hellenic Air Force
- Location: Tympaki
- Time zone: EEST (UTC+3)
- Elevation AMSL: 7 ft (2.1 m)
- Coordinates: 35°03′48.74″N 24°45′57.23″E

Map
- Location in Greece

Runways
| Direction | Length | | Surface |
| Direction | ft | m | Surface |
|---|---|---|---|
| 09/27 | 8,900 | 2,713 | Asphalt |
| ~~16/34~~ | ~~2,302~~ | ~~700~~ | Concrete |
- World Aero Data

Tympaki Airport (Greek: Αεροδρόμιο Τυμπακίου) is a military airport in Tympaki, Crete, Greece and belongs to the Hellenic Air Force. The 138 Σ.Μ of H.A.F. operates at the airport. The airport also has a TACAN system for the aircraft. There are two runways at the airfield. One of them is now closed, the second, with asphalt pavement and a length of 2713 m, is sometimes used for car racing. Also, home base airport of H.A.T. (Heraklion Airclub Talos) for Gliders KA-7, KA-8 and Ultralight Tucano flights.

== Tympaki Air Base ==
The airport is home to the 24th Guided Missile Squadron attached to 350th Guided Missile Wing of the Hellenic Air Force and operates MIM-104 Patriot PAC-3 batteries.

== See also ==
- List of airports in Crete
