= List of airports in Crete =

The Greek island of Crete is home to several airports, both public and military.

== List ==
| Name | Location | Use | ICAO | IATA | Coordinates |
|---|---|---|---|---|---|
| Heraklion International Airport | Heraklion | Civil/Military | LGIR | HER | 35°20′23″N 25°10′49″E |
| Chania International Airport | Chania | Civil/Military | LGSA | CHQ | 35°31′54″N 024°08′59″E |
| Sitia Public Airport | Sitia | Civil | LGST | JSH | 35°12′57.99″N 26°06′04.77″E |
| Kasteli Airport | Kastelli | Military | LGTL | – | 35°11′36.40″N 25°19′41.10″E |
| Maleme Airport | Maleme | Civil | – | – | 35°31′45.70″N 23°49′56.23″E |
| Tympaki Airport | Tympaki | Military | – | – | 35°03′48.74″N 24°45′57.23″E |

== See also ==
- List of airports in Greece
