= Bluebird Airways =

Greek airline

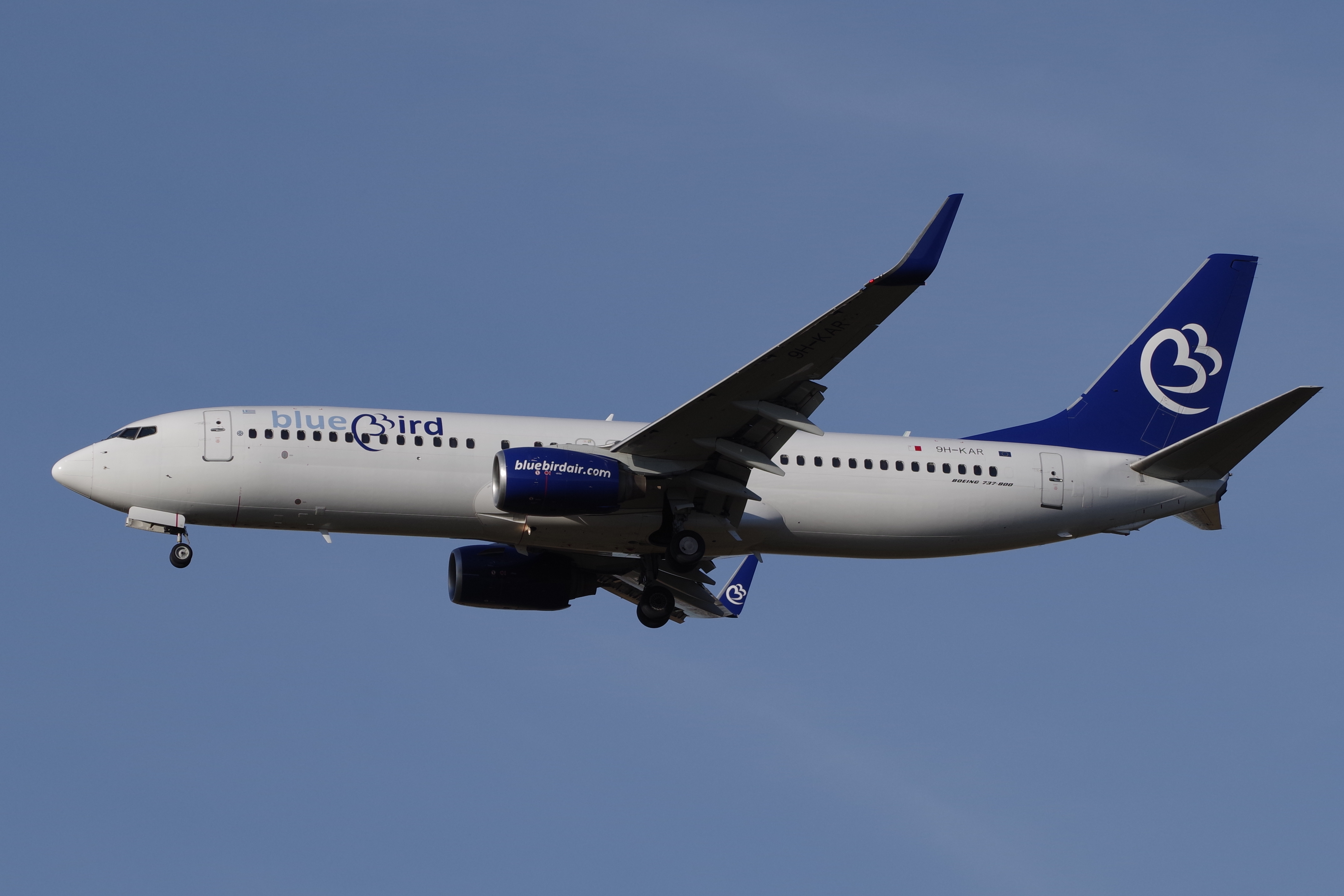
- Boeing 737-800
IATA	ICAO	Call sign
BZ	BBG	CANDIA BIRD
- Founded: 2008; Heraklion, Crete, Greece
- Operating bases: Heraklion
- Focus cities: Ben Gurion Airport
- Fleet size: 4
- Destinations: 22
- Website: www.bluebirdair.com

Bluebird Airways is an international airline headquartered in Heraklion International Airport in Heraklion, Greece.

== History ==
Bluebird Airways is a Greek airline, established in 2008 in Heraklion, Crete, Greece. It is mainly involved in the transportation of passengers and cargo from Tel Aviv according to schedule and charter flights.

== Destinations ==
Country	City	Airport	Notes
Austria	Vienna	Vienna International Airport	
Bulgaria	Burgas	Burgas Airport	Seasonal
Bulgaria	Sofia	Vasil Levski Sofia Airport	
Cyprus	Larnaca	Larnaca International Airport – Glafcos Clerides	
Cyprus	Paphos	Paphos International Airport	
Germany	Berlin	Berlin Brandenburg Airport	
Germany	Düsseldorf	Düsseldorf Airport	Terminated
Germany	Munich	Munich Airport	
Czech Republic	Prague	Václav Havel Airport Prague	Terminated
Greece	Athens	Athens International Airport "Eleftherios Venizelos"	Focus city
Greece	Chania	Chania International Airport "Daskalogiannis"	Seasonal
Greece	Heraklion	Heraklion International Airport "Nikos Kazantzakis"	Base
Greece	Mykonos	Mykonos-Manto Mavrogenous Airport	Seasonal
Greece	Kos	Kos International Airport "Ippokratis"	Seasonal
Greece	Rhodes	Rhodes International Airport "Diagoras"	Seasonal
Greece	Santorini	Santorini (Thira) International Airport	Seasonal
Greece	Thessaloniki	Macedonia International Airport	
Greece	Zakynthos	Zakynthos International Airport "Dionysios Solomos"	Seasonal
Hungary	Budapest	Budapest Ferenc Liszt International Airport	
Israel	Tel Aviv	David Ben Gurion International Airport	Focus city
Italy	Bergamo	Orio al Serio International Airport	
Italy	Naples	Naples-Capodichino International Airport	
Italy	Bologna	Bologna Guglielmo Marconi Airport	
Italy	Rome	Leonardo da Vinci–Fiumicino Airport	
Italy	Verona	Verona Villafranca Airport	Seasonal
Netherlands	Amsterdam	Amsterdam Airport Schiphol	
Poland	Warsaw	Warsaw Chopin Airport	Terminated
Romania	Bucharest	Henri Coandă International Airport	Seasonal
Spain	Barcelona	Josep Tarradellas Barcelona–El Prat Airport	

== Fleet ==
=== Current fleet ===
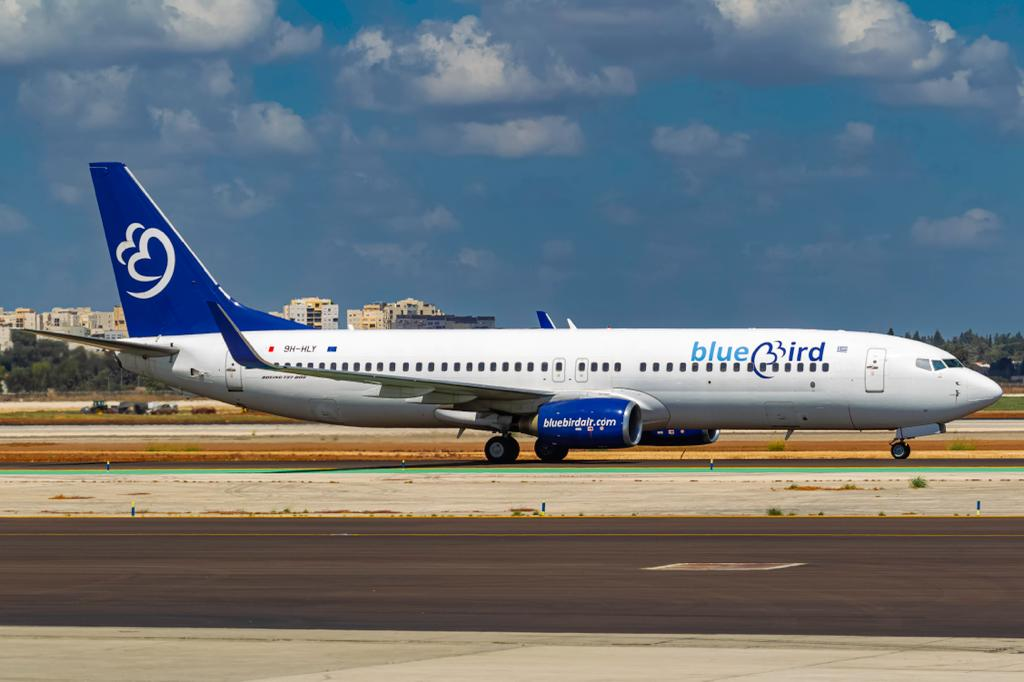
Bluebird Airways Boeing 737-800

As of July 2026, Bluebird Airways operates the following aircraft:

Bluebird Airways fleet
Aircraft	In service	Orders	Passengers	Notes
Boeing 737-800	4	—	189	
Total	4	—		

=== Fleet development ===
In 2013, Bluebird Airways added MD83 YR-HBH (170Y), MD82 YR-MDK (160Y), MD82 YR-OTN (160Y), to its fleet on wet-lease, in order to operate seasonal scheduled flights. On 26 July 2016, Bluebird Airways added Boeing 737-3Y0 9H-TAS to its fleet. In September the plane made its first flights from Heraklion to Tel-Aviv and back. In July 2017, Bluebird Airways added Boeing 737-33A 9H-NOA to its fleet.Bluebird Airways plans further expansion in the near future to enhance its fleet capacity and operational efficiency.

=== Former fleet ===
As of August 2025, Bluebird Airways operated 4 Boeing 737-800.
