= Discover Airlines =

German leisure airline

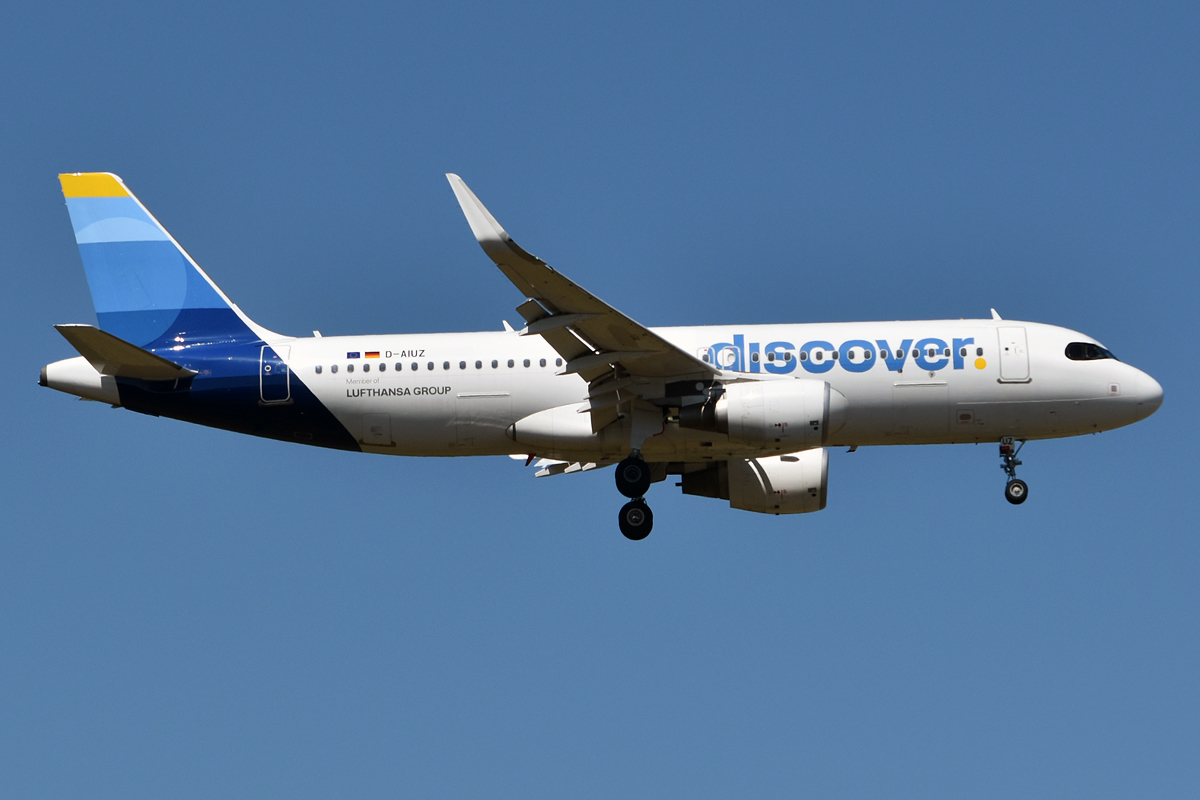
- Airbus A320
IATA	ICAO	Call sign
4Y	OCN	OCEAN
- Founded: July 2021 as Eurowings Discover
- Commenced operations: 24 July 2021 as Eurowings Discover
- Operating bases: Frankfurt; Munich
- Frequent-flyer program: Miles & More
- Fleet size: 33
- Destinations: 62
- Parent company: Lufthansa
- Headquarters: Frankfurt, Hesse, Germany
- Website: discover-airlines.com

Discover Airlines, legally incorporated as EW Discover GmbH and formerly branded Eurowings Discover, is a German leisure airline headquartered in Frankfurt, Hesse. It is owned by Lufthansa and serves leisure destinations around the Mediterranean, North America, Black Sea, Africa and the Caribbean from its airport bases at Frankfurt Airport and Munich Airport.

== History ==
=== 2021: Eurowings Discover ===
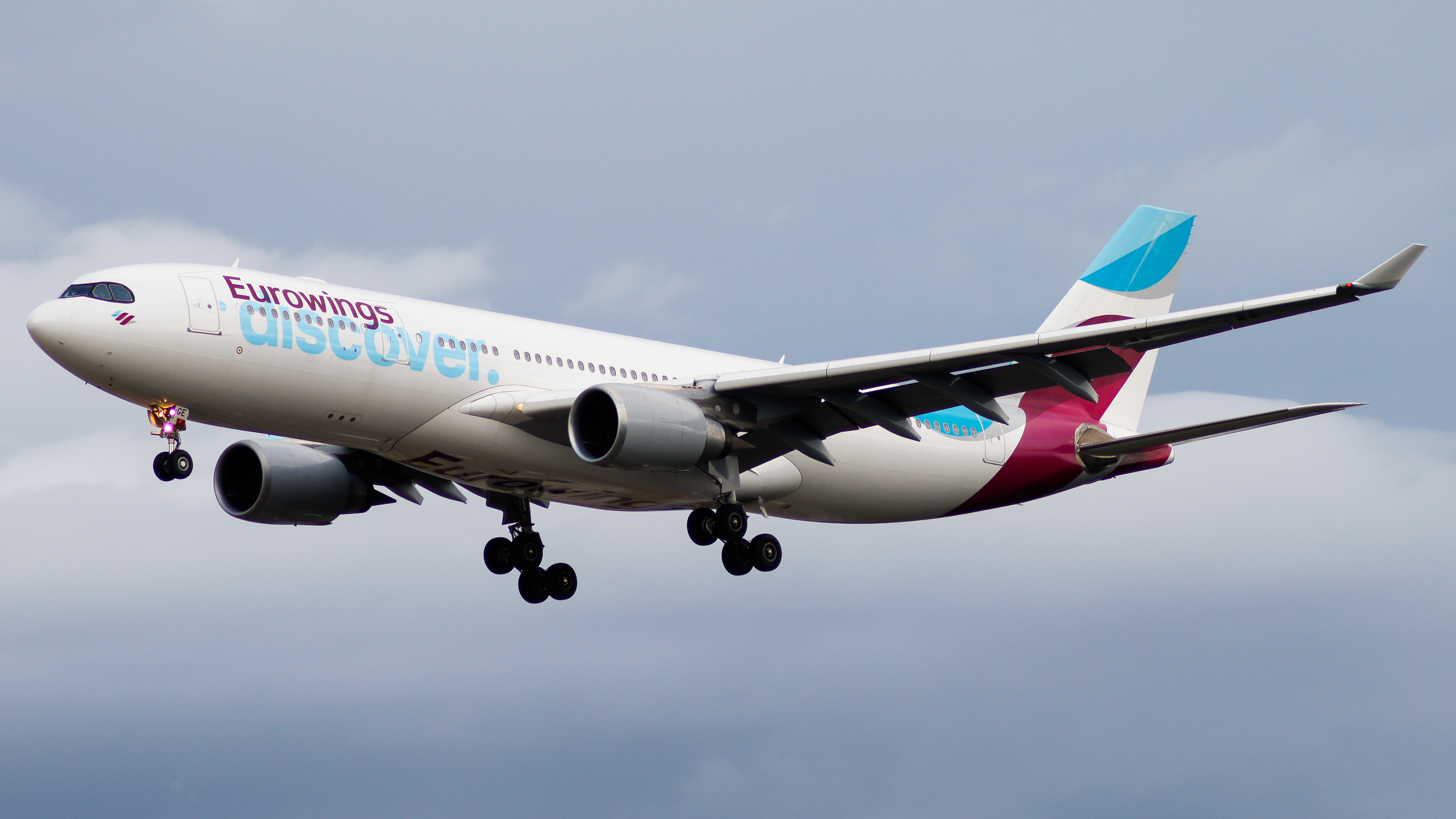
Eurowings Discover A330-200

Discover Airlines started operations on 24 July 2021 as Eurowings Discover, flying from Frankfurt to Mombasa and Zanzibar with a single Airbus A330, having obtained its air operator's certificate. It adopted its brand name and original corporate identity from sister company Eurowings. It is considered to be the main competitor of German leisure carrier Condor (itself once owned by Lufthansa) which serves several of the routes Discover Airlines will also take up.

The carrier has already expanded its network to Punta Cana, Windhoek and Victoria Falls. Later in 2021 Eurowings Discover added flights to Las Vegas, Mauritius, Bridgetown, Montego Bay, Varadero, Canary Islands, Egypt, and Morocco. The fleet is supposed to grow to 10 A320s and 11 A330s by mid-2022.

In September 2021, Lufthansa announced it would move responsibility for several mid-haul leisure routes to Eurowings Discover. It based three Airbus A320-200s in Frankfurt serving five destinations on the Canary Islands in late 2021.

=== 2022: Eurowings Discover ===
In summer 2022, Eurowings Discover established its second operational base at Munich Airport, focused on short-haul operations around the Mediterranean.

In September 2022, Lufthansa moved some of its own routes to Canada to Eurowings Discover for the upcoming winter season. In late 2022, Eurowings Discover announced it would focus its long-haul operations at Frankfurt Airport, terminating their North American and Caribbean services from Munich Airport. Prior to this, the flights were already suspended as the airline took over North American routes at Frankfurt Airport from parent Lufthansa due to staff shortages.

Discover Airlines A330-300

=== 2023: Transition to Discover Airlines ===
In September 2023, the airline announced its new identity as Discover Airlines.

== Corporate affairs ==
Discover Airlines is headquartered in the Frankfurt Airport Center (FAC) in Frankfurt Airport, Frankfurt.

== Destinations ==
Country	City	Airport	Notes	Ref.
Barbados	Bridgetown	Grantley Adams International Airport	Terminated	
Belize	Belize City	Philip S. W. Goldson International Airport	Begins 16 December 2027 (Seasonal)	
Bulgaria	Burgas	Burgas Airport	Seasonal	
Bulgaria	Varna	Varna Airport		
Canada	Calgary	Calgary International Airport		
Canada	Edmonton	Edmonton International Airport	Begins 1 June 2027 (Seasonal)	
Canada	Halifax	Halifax Stanfield International Airport	Seasonal	
Canada	Toronto	Toronto Pearson International Airport	Terminated	
Canada	Vancouver	Vancouver International Airport	Terminated	
Costa Rica	San José	Juan Santamaría International Airport	Begins 14 December 2027	
Croatia	Dubrovnik	Dubrovnik Airport	Seasonal	
Croatia	Pula	Pula Airport	Terminated	
Croatia	Split	Split Airport		
Croatia	Zadar	Zadar Airport	Seasonal	
Cuba	Varadero	Juan Gualberto Gómez Airport	Terminated	
Cyprus	Larnaca	Larnaca International Airport		
Dominican Republic	La Romana	La Romana International Airport		
Dominican Republic	Puerto Plata	Gregorio Luperón International Airport	Terminated	
Dominican Republic	Punta Cana	Punta Cana International Airport		
Egypt	Hurghada	Hurghada International Airport	Seasonal	
Egypt	Marsa Alam	Marsa Alam International Airport	Terminated	
Finland	Ivalo	Ivalo Airport	Begins 23 December 2026 (Seasonal)	
Finland	Kajaani	Kajaani Airport	Begins 17 December 2027 (Seasonal)	
Finland	Kittilä	Kittilä Airport	Seasonal	
Finland	Oulu	Oulu Airport	Terminated	
Finland	Savonlinna	Savonlinna Airport	Begins 19 June 2027 (Seasonal)	
France	Montpellier	Montpellier–Méditerranée Airport	Terminated	
Germany	Frankfurt	Frankfurt Airport	Hub	
Germany	Munich	Munich Airport	Hub	
Greece	Chania	Chania International Airport	Seasonal	
Greece	Corfu	Corfu International Airport	Seasonal	
Greece	Heraklion	Heraklion International Airport		
Greece	Kalamata	Kalamata International Airport	Seasonal	
Greece	Kavala	Kavala International Airport	Terminated	
Greece	Kefalonia	Kefalonia International Airport	Seasonal	
Greece	Kos	Kos International Airport	Seasonal	
Greece	Mykonos	Mykonos Airport	Seasonal	
Greece	Preveza	Aktion National Airport	Terminated	
Greece	Rhodes	Rhodes International Airport	Seasonal	
Greece	Samos	Samos International Airport	Seasonal	
Greece	Santorini	Santorini International Airport	Seasonal	
Greece	Skiathos	Skiathos International Airport	Seasonal	
Greece	Zakynthos	Zakynthos International Airport	Seasonal	
Iceland	Reykjavík	Keflavik International Airport		
Ireland	Shannon	Shannon Airport	Seasonal	
Italy	Alghero	Alghero–Fertilia Airport	Begins 4 June 2027 (Seasonal)	
Italy	Bari	Bari Karol Wojtyła Airport		
Italy	Brindisi	Brindisi Airport	Seasonal	
Italy	Genoa	Genoa Cristoforo Colombo Airport	Begins 28 March 2027 (Seasonal)	
Italy	Lamezia Terme	Lamezia Terme International Airport	Terminated	
Jamaica	Montego Bay	Sangster International Airport	Terminated	
Kenya	Mombasa	Moi International Airport		
Mauritius	Port Louis	Sir Seewoosagur Ramgoolam International Airport	Seasonal	
Maldives	Malé	Velana International Airport	Seasonal	
Mexico	Cancún	Cancún International Airport	Seasonal	
Mexico	Tulum	Tulum International Airport	Terminated	
Morocco	Agadir	Agadir–Al Massira Airport	Seasonal	
Morocco	Marrakesh	Marrakesh Menara Airport		
Namibia	Windhoek	Hosea Kutako International Airport		
Norway	Ålesund	Ålesund Airport, Vigra	Terminated	
Norway	Alta	Alta Airport	Seasonal	
Norway	Bodø	Bodø Airport	Seasonal	
Norway	Harstad / Narvik	Harstad/Narvik Airport, Evenes		
Norway	Tromsø	Tromsø Airport	Terminated	
Portugal	Funchal	Cristiano Ronaldo International Airport		
Portugal	Porto Santo	Porto Santo Airport	Terminated	
Panama	Panama City	Tocumen International Airport	Terminated	
Serbia	Belgrade	Belgrade Nikola Tesla Airport	Terminated	
Seychelles	Victoria	Seychelles International Airport		
South Africa	Mbombela	Kruger Mpumalanga International Airport	Terminated	
Spain	Fuerteventura	Fuerteventura Airport	Seasonal	
Spain	Gran Canaria	Gran Canaria Airport		
Spain	Ibiza	Ibiza Airport		
Spain	Jerez de la Frontera	Jerez Airport	Seasonal	
Spain	La Palma	La Palma Airport	Seasonal	
Spain	Lanzarote	Lanzarote Airport	Seasonal	
Spain	Malaga	Malaga Airport		
Spain	Menorca	Menorca Airport	Seasonal	
Spain	Palma de Mallorca	Palma de Mallorca Airport		
Spain	Tenerife	Tenerife South Airport		
Tanzania	Kilimanjaro	Kilimanjaro International Airport	Terminated	
Tanzania	Zanzibar	Abeid Amani Karume International Airport	Seasonal	
Turkey	Antalya	Antalya Airport	Terminated	
Turkey	Bodrum	Milas–Bodrum Airport	Terminated	
Tunisia	Djerba	Djerba–Zarzis International Airport	Seasonal	
Tunisia	Monastir	Monastir Habib Bourguiba International Airport	Seasonal	
United Kingdom	Bristol	Bristol Airport	Begins 17 May 2027 (Seasonal)	
United Kingdom	Glasgow	Glasgow Airport	Begins 29 March 2027	
United Kingdom	Inverness	Inverness Airport	Begins 19 June 2027 (Seasonal)	
United States	Anchorage	Ted Stevens Anchorage International Airport	Terminated	
United States	Atlanta	Hartsfield–Jackson Atlanta International Airport	Terminated	
United States	Fort Myers	Southwest Florida International Airport		
United States	Las Vegas	Harry Reid International Airport		
United States	Minneapolis/St Paul	Minneapolis–Saint Paul International Airport	Seasonal	
United States	Orlando	Orlando International Airport		
United States	Philadelphia	Philadelphia International Airport		
United States	Salt Lake City	Salt Lake City International Airport	Terminated	
United States	Seattle	Seattle–Tacoma International Airport	Begins March 2027	
United States	Tampa	Tampa International Airport		
Zimbabwe	Victoria Falls	Victoria Falls Airport		

=== Codeshare agreements ===
Discover Airlines has codeshare agreements with the following airlines:

- Aegean Airlines
- Air Canada
- Austrian Airlines
- Brussels Airlines
- Lufthansa
- Swiss International Air Lines
- United Airlines

== Fleet ==
=== Current fleet ===
As of October 2026, Discover Airlines operates the following aircraft:

Aircraft	In service		Orders	Passengers					Notes
Aircraft	In service		Orders	C	W	Y+	Y	Total	Notes
Airbus A320-200	18		—	20	—	12	138	170	
Airbus A330-300	15	13	1	30	28	44	181	283	Being transferred from Lufthansa. To be retrofitted.
Airbus A330-300	15	2	1	27	31	24	220	302	Being transferred from Lufthansa. To be retrofitted.
Airbus A330-300	—		—	30	31	—	227	288	Future Ocean Blue interior configuration to enter service in April 2027.
Airbus A350-900	—		4	30	26	—	262	318	To be transferred from Lufthansa.
Airbus A350-900	—		9	TBA					Factory new aircraft as part of a Lufthansa order. Deliveries starting in 2029.
Total	33		14						

=== Former fleet ===
Discover Airlines has previously operated the following aircraft:

Aircraft	Total	Introduced	Retired	Ref
Airbus A330-200	3	2021	2026	
