= Sky Express (Greece) =

Airline of Greece

SKY Express

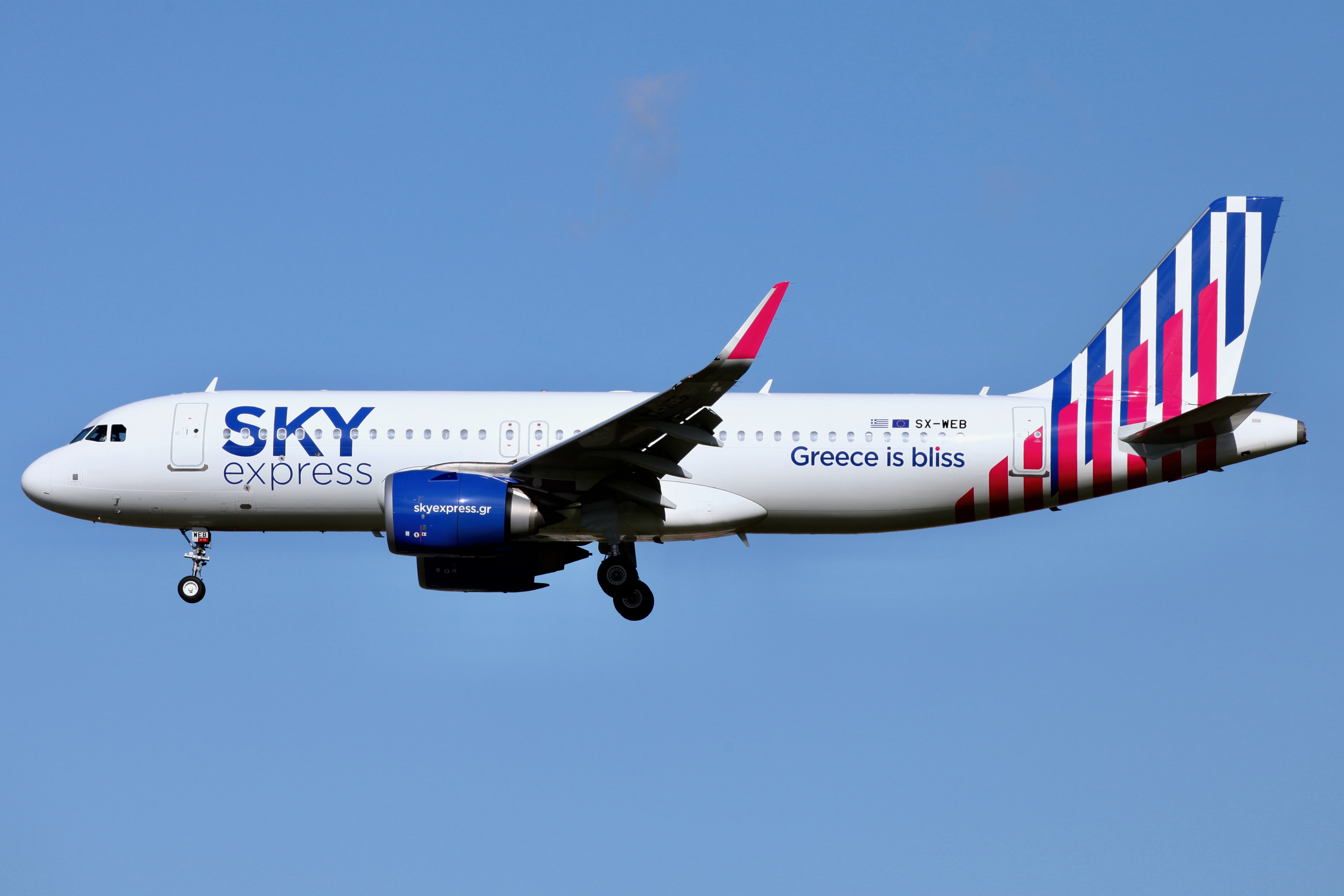
- SKY Express Airbus A320neo
IATA	ICAO	Call sign
GQ	SEH	AIR CRETE
- Founded: 24 February 2005; 21 years ago
- AOC #: GR-021
- Operating bases: Athens; Heraklion; Thessaloniki
- Fleet size: 29
- Destinations: 55
- Parent company: Aviareps Hellas
- Headquarters: Heraklion International Airport, Heraklion, Greece
- Revenue: €513 million
- Employees: 924
- Website: www.skyexpress.gr

SKY Express (legally Cretan Aviation Operations Aviation and Commercial Societe Anonyme; Greek: Κρητικές Αεροπορικές Εκμεταλλεύσεις Αεροπορική και Εμπορική Ανώνυμη Εταιρεία) is a Greek airline headquartered in Heraklion International Airport. It was established in 2005 and operates a number of flights, serving 35 domestic and eighteen international destinations year round.

It is owned by Aviareps Hellas.

== History ==
The airline was established in early 2005 by Miltiadis Tsagkarakis, former Olympic Airlines director general and pilot, and George Mavrantonakis, former Olympic Airlines chief operating officer and accountable manager as well as advisor to the company president. Operations commenced in July 2005, including scheduled, charter, cargo, air taxi, emergency medical services, excursion and sightseeing flights. Sky Express Aircargo was later established as a joint venture with the Finaval Group and dedicated to cargo transport between Europe and the Far East.

In October 2020, the airline placed a firm order for four Airbus A320neo aircraft (the fleet now includes six of them). In addition, the company introduced a new livery for their new Airbus aircraft.

=== Logo controversy ===
The airline's initial logo was inspired by the flag of the Cretan State, a semi-independent state under the Ottoman Empire. The flag of the Cretan State was composed of a white cross extending to the edges of the flag, with the upper-hoist canton in red, featuring a white star symbolizing Ottoman sovereignty on the island, and the other squares in blue, symbolizing the Greeks of Crete. The flag has also been adopted as a symbol of the Cretan independence pseudo-movement. The logo was not well-received, and following complaints by the public in Greece, especially Cretans, the logo was changed. The company said it did not consider the flag offensive, since it represented a milestone in the unification of Crete with the Kingdom of Greece, but changed the logo nonetheless to avoid any further confusion.

== Corporate affairs ==
In 2018, Sky Express carried 1 million passengers for the first time.

	2015	2016	2017	2018	2019	2020	2021	2022	2023	2024	2025
Turnover (€m)	16.299	16.616	34.068	61.475	81.340	54.940	137.569	287.690	392.680	440.753	513.072
Net profit after tax (€m)	0.169	−1.391	−0.156	0.304	−0.250	−7.655	−3.793	−1.421	20.141	21.523	15.623
Number of employees	77	86	129	193	229	263	462	577		821	924
Number of passengers	85,174	168,116	496,562	1,000,000	1,200,000	TBA	1,717,191	3,303,997	4,146,921	4,691,305 (Note: Revised figure)	5,132,414
Number of aircraft (at year end)	6	11	11	11	11	20	18	21	23	27	29
Notes/sources											

== Destinations ==
As of June 2025, Greek carrier Sky Express flies (or has flown) to the following destinations:

Country or territory	City	Airport	Notes	Refs
Albania	Tirana	Tirana International Airport Nënë Tereza		
Armenia	Yerevan	Zvartnots International Airport		
Austria	Vienna	Vienna International Airport		
Belgium	Brussels	Brussels Airport		
Bulgaria	Sofia	Vasil Levski Sofia Airport		
Cyprus	Larnaca	Larnaca Airport		
Czech Republic	Prague	Václav Havel Airport Prague		
France	Lille	Lille Airport	Seasonal	
France	Lyon	Lyon–Saint-Exupéry Airport		
France	Marseille	Marseille Provence Airport	Seasonal	
France	Nantes	Nantes Atlantique Airport	Seasonal	
France	Paris	Charles de Gaulle Airport		
Georgia	Tbilisi	Tbilisi International Airport		
Germany	Berlin	Berlin Brandenburg Airport		
Germany	Düsseldorf	Düsseldorf Airport		
Germany	Frankfurt	Frankfurt Airport		
Germany	Hamburg	Hamburg Airport		
Germany	Munich	Munich Airport		
Greece	Alexandroupoli	Alexandroupoli Airport		
Greece	Astypalaia	Astypalaia Island National Airport		
Greece	Athens	Athens International Airport	Base	
Greece	Chania	Chania International Airport		
Greece	Chios	Chios Island National Airport		
Greece	Corfu	Corfu International Airport		
Greece	Heraklion	Heraklion International Airport	Base	
Greece	Ikaria	Ikaria Island National Airport		
Greece	Kalymnos	Kalymnos Island National Airport		
Greece	Karpathos	Karpathos Island National Airport		
Greece	Kasos	Kasos Island Public Airport		
Greece	Kastoria	Kastoria National Airport		
Greece	Kefalonia	Kefalonia Airport		
Greece	Kos	Kos International Airport		
Greece	Kozani	Kozani National Airport		
Greece	Kythera	Kithira Island National Airport		
Greece	Lemnos	Lemnos International Airport		
Greece	Leros	Leros Municipal Airport		
Greece	Milos	Milos Island National Airport		
Greece	Mykonos	Mykonos Airport		
Greece	Mytilene	Mytilene International Airport		
Greece	Naxos	Naxos Island National Airport		
Greece	Paros	Paros National Airport		
Greece	Preveza	Aktion National Airport		
Greece	Rhodes	Rhodes International Airport		
Greece	Samos	Samos International Airport		
Greece	Santorini	Santorini International Airport		
Greece	Sitia	Sitia Airport		
Greece	Skiathos	Skiathos Airport		
Greece	Skyros	Skyros Island National Airport		
Greece	Syros	Syros Island National Airport		
Greece	Thessaloniki	Thessaloniki Airport	Base	
Greece	Volos	Nea Anchialos National Airport	Seasonal	
Greece	Zakynthos	Zakynthos International Airport		
Israel	Tel Aviv	David Ben Gurion International Airport		
Italy	Milan	Milan Malpensa Airport		
Italy	Rome	Rome Fiumicino Airport		
The Netherlands	Amsterdam	Amsterdam Schiphol Airport		
Poland	Warsaw	Warsaw Chopin Airport		
Portugal	Lisbon	Lisbon Humberto Delgado Airport		
Spain	Madrid	Madrid–Barajas Airport		
Spain	Barcelona	El Prat Airport		
Turkey	Istanbul	Istanbul Airport		
United Kingdom	London	Gatwick Airport		

=== Codeshare agreements ===
Sky Express codeshares with the following airlines:

- Etihad Airways

=== Interline agreements ===
Sky Express interlines with the following airlines:

- Air France
- Air Serbia
- Air Transat
- American Airlines
- British Airways
- Condor
- Cyprus Airways
- Delta Air Lines
- El Al
- EasyJet
- Emirates
- Etihad Airways
- ITA Airways
- KLM
- Middle East Airlines
- Qatar Airways
- Royal Jordanian
- Transavia
- Turkish Airlines

== Fleet ==
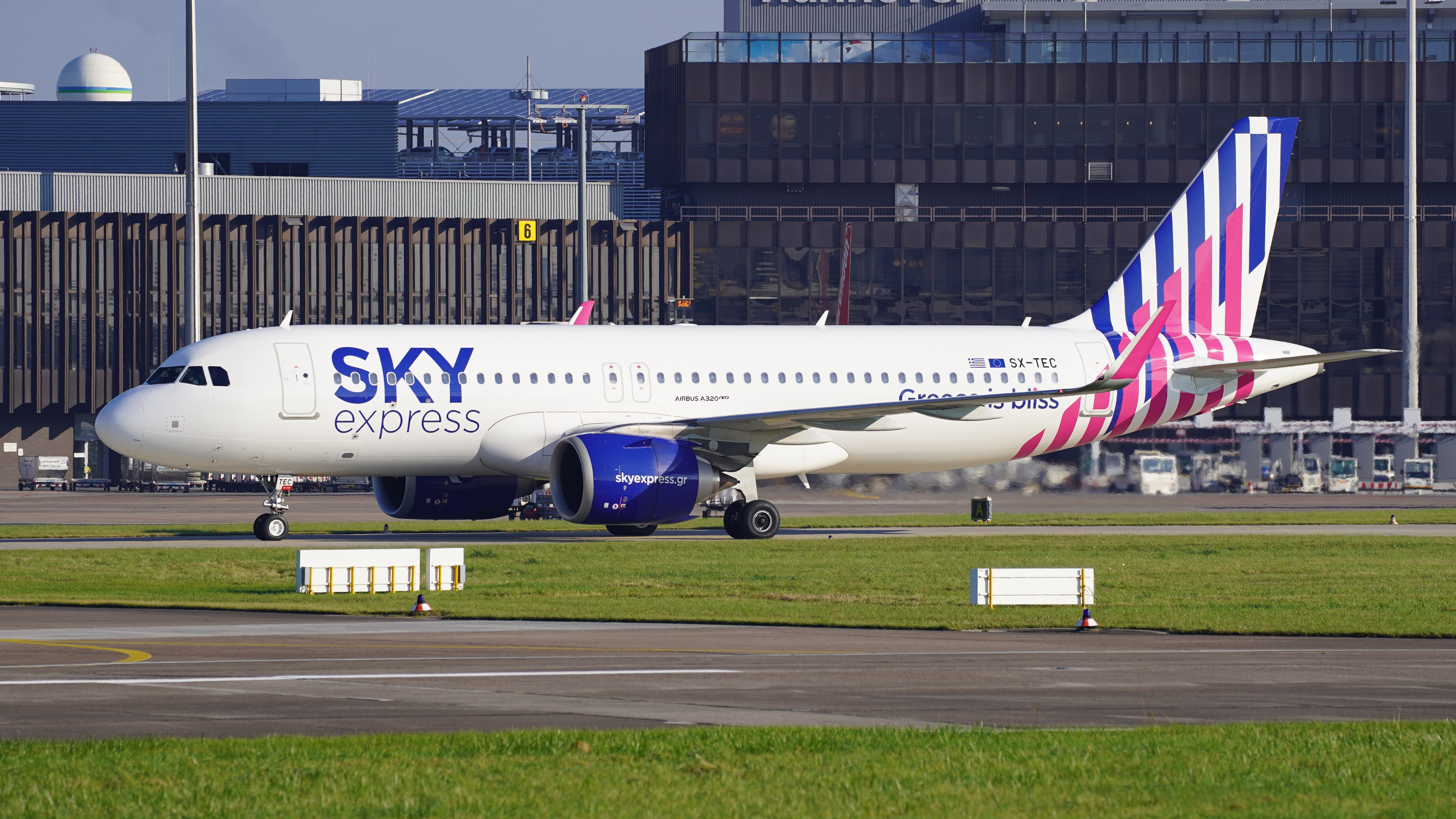
Sky Express Airbus A320neo

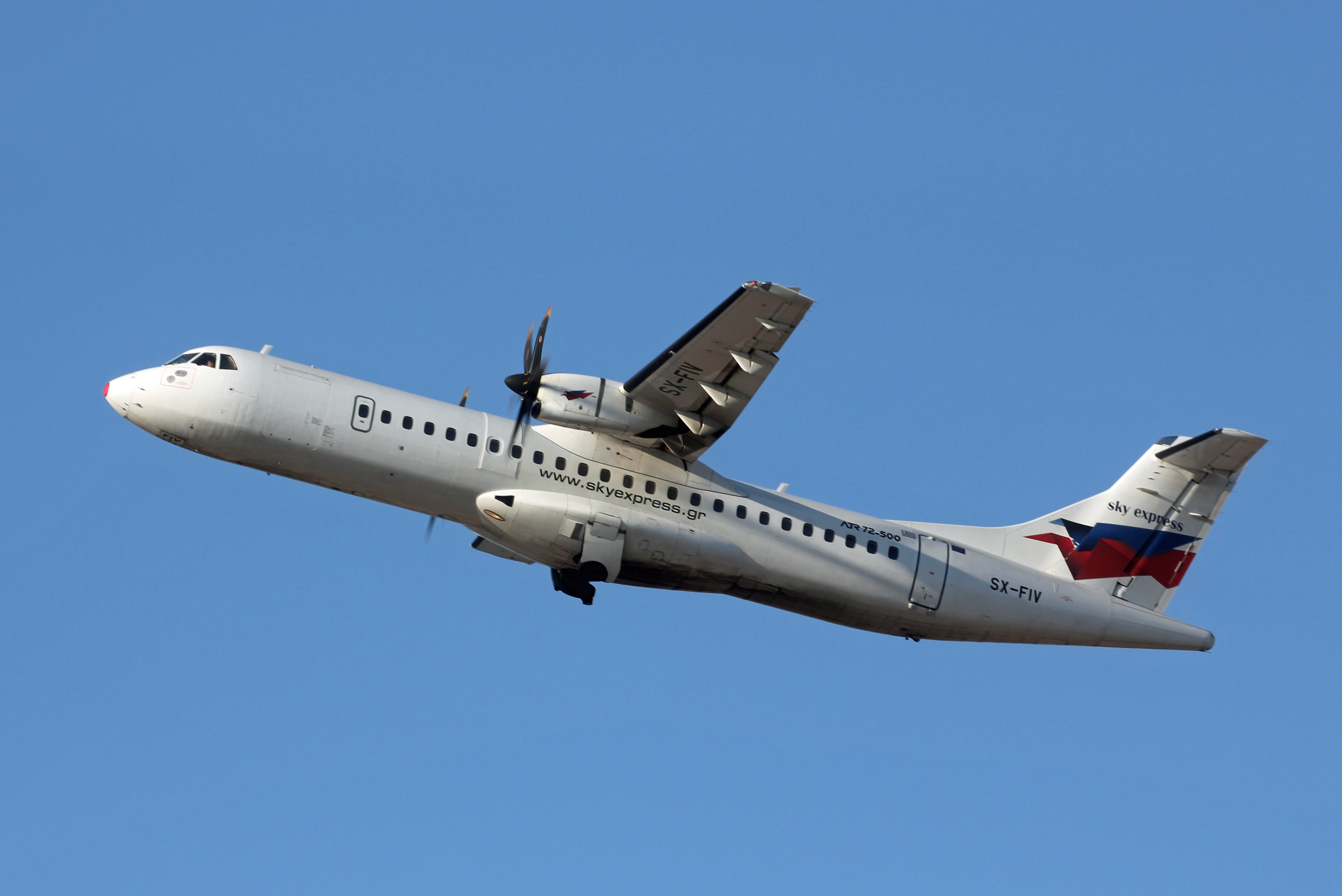
Sky Express ATR 72-500

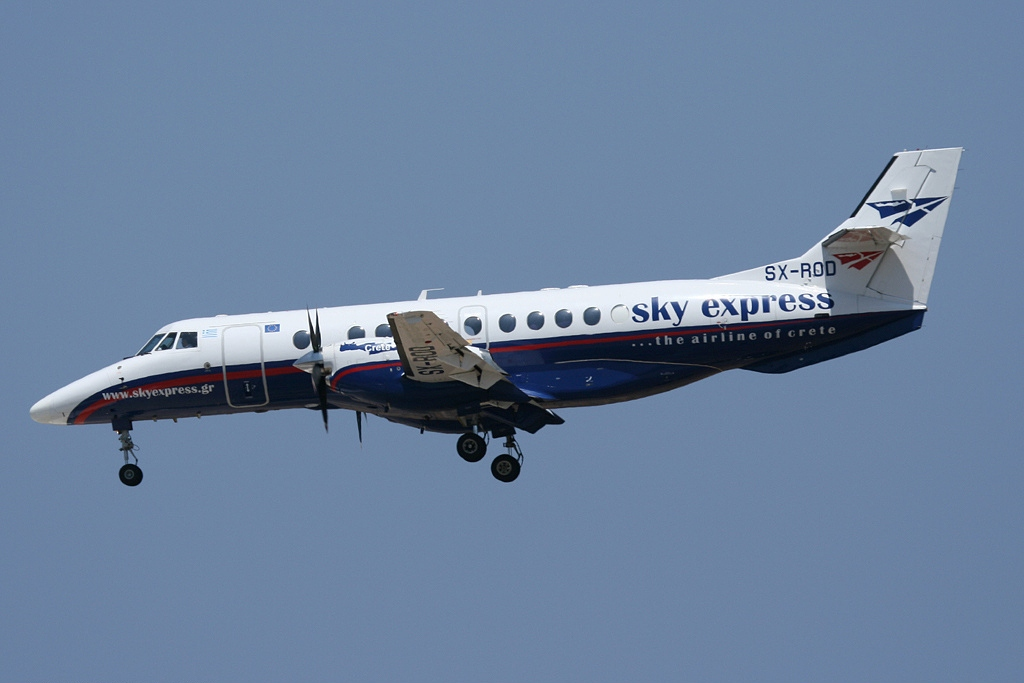
Former Sky Express BAe Jetstream 41 in 2010

=== Current fleet ===
As of July 2026, Sky Express operates the following aircraft:

Sky Express fleet
Aircraft	In service	Orders	Passengers	Notes
Airbus A320-200	1	—	180	
Airbus A320neo	12	—	174	
Airbus A320neo	12	—	180	
Airbus A320neo	12	—	186	
Airbus A321neo	2	—	236	
ATR 42-500	4	—	48	
ATR 72-600	10	—	72	
Total	29	—		

== Incidents ==
- On 12 February 2009, a BAe Jetstream 31 registered SX-SKY experienced a right main gear collapse after landing inbound from Rhodes International Airport. None of the 15 passengers or three crew members were injured, but the aircraft suffered considerable damage to its right landing gear, wing and propeller. The aircraft was deemed beyond economical repair and was written off. The accident was caused by two previous hard landings (out of the previous 27) which had gone unreported. One of the hard landings had caused a fracture in a landing gear cylinder, which spread until the cylinder failed, causing the landing gear to collapse. The aircraft was scrapped at Heraklion Airport in late February 2011.
- On 2 February 2015, a BAe Jetstream 41 aircraft registered SX-DIA, operating flight GQ-100 from Heraklion, experienced a left main gear collapse and runway excursion after a hard landing at Rhodes Diagoras Airport caused by strong winds. None of the 16 passengers or three crew members were injured. The aircraft suffered substantial damage.
- On 21 June 2019, the 3 PM flight from Heraklion to Rhodes Diagoras Airport performed an emergency landing at Karpathos Airport after one of the engines exploded. None of the 47 passengers suffered any injuries.
