= Chania International Airport =

Airport on the Greek island of Crete

Chania International Airport "Daskalogiannis"

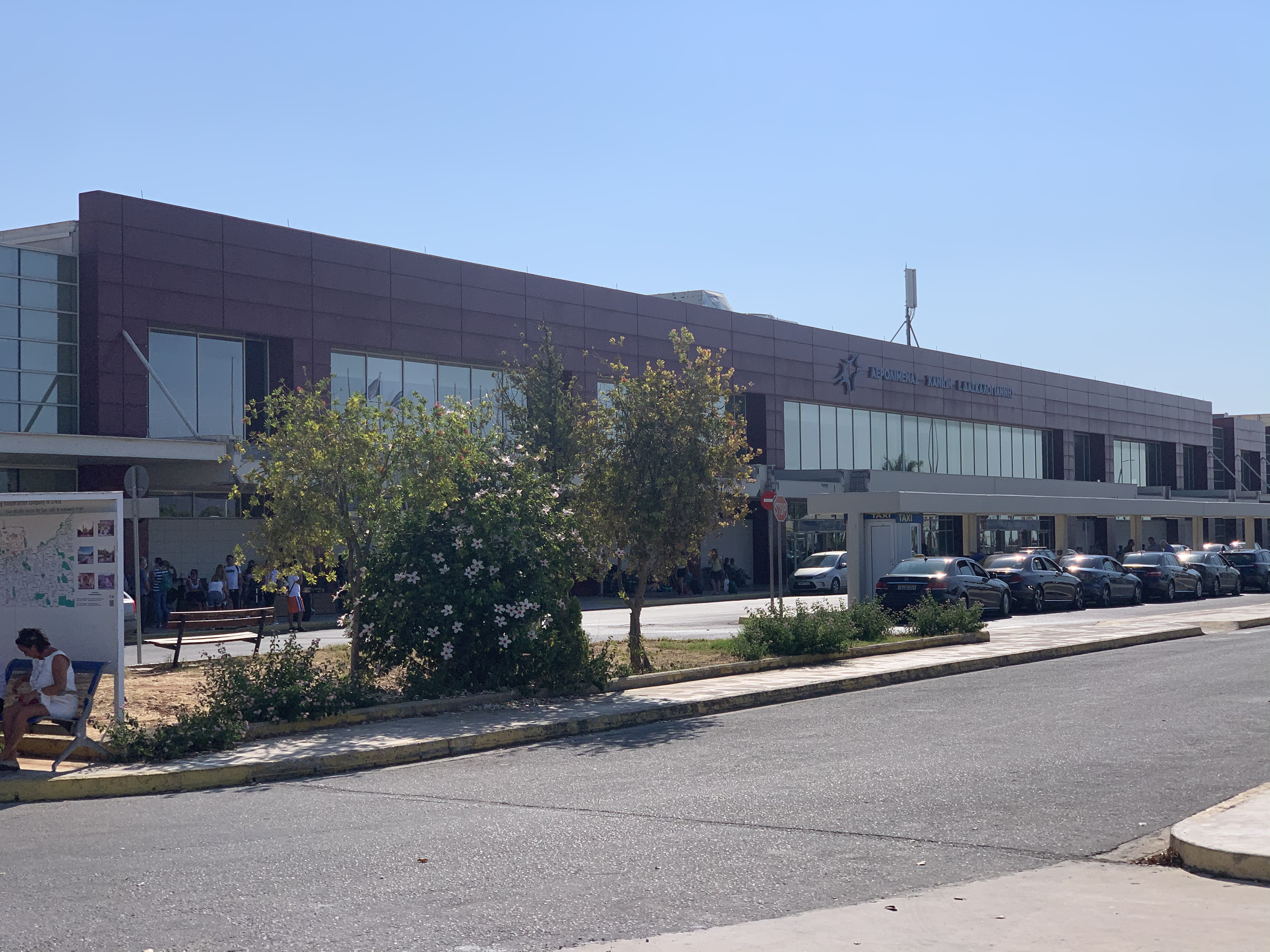
- IATA: CHQ; ICAO: LGSA

Summary
- Airport type: Public/military
- Owner: Hellenic Civil Aviation Authority
- Operator: Fraport Greece
- Serves: Chania, Crete
- Focus city for: Aegean Airlines; Ryanair
- Elevation AMSL: 149 m (489 ft)
- Coordinates: 35°31′54″N 024°08′59″E
- Website: chq-airport.gr

Map
- Location in Greece

Runways
Direction	Length		Surface
Direction	m	ft	Surface
11L/29R	3,347	10,981	Asphalt

Statistics (2024)
- Passengers: 3,952,126
- Passenger traffic change: ▲8.3%
- Aircraft movements: 26,502
- Aircraft movements change: ▲7.4%
- Source: Fraport-Greece

Chania International Airport "Daskalogiannis" (IATA: CHQ, ICAO: LGSA) is an international airport located near Souda Bay on the Akrotiri peninsula of the Greek island of Crete, serving the city of Chania, 14 kilometres (8.7 mi) away. It is a gateway to western Crete for an increasing number of tourists. The airport is named after Daskalogiannis, a Cretan rebel against Ottoman rule in the 18th century, and is a joint civil–military airport. It is the sixth-busiest airport in Greece.

== History ==
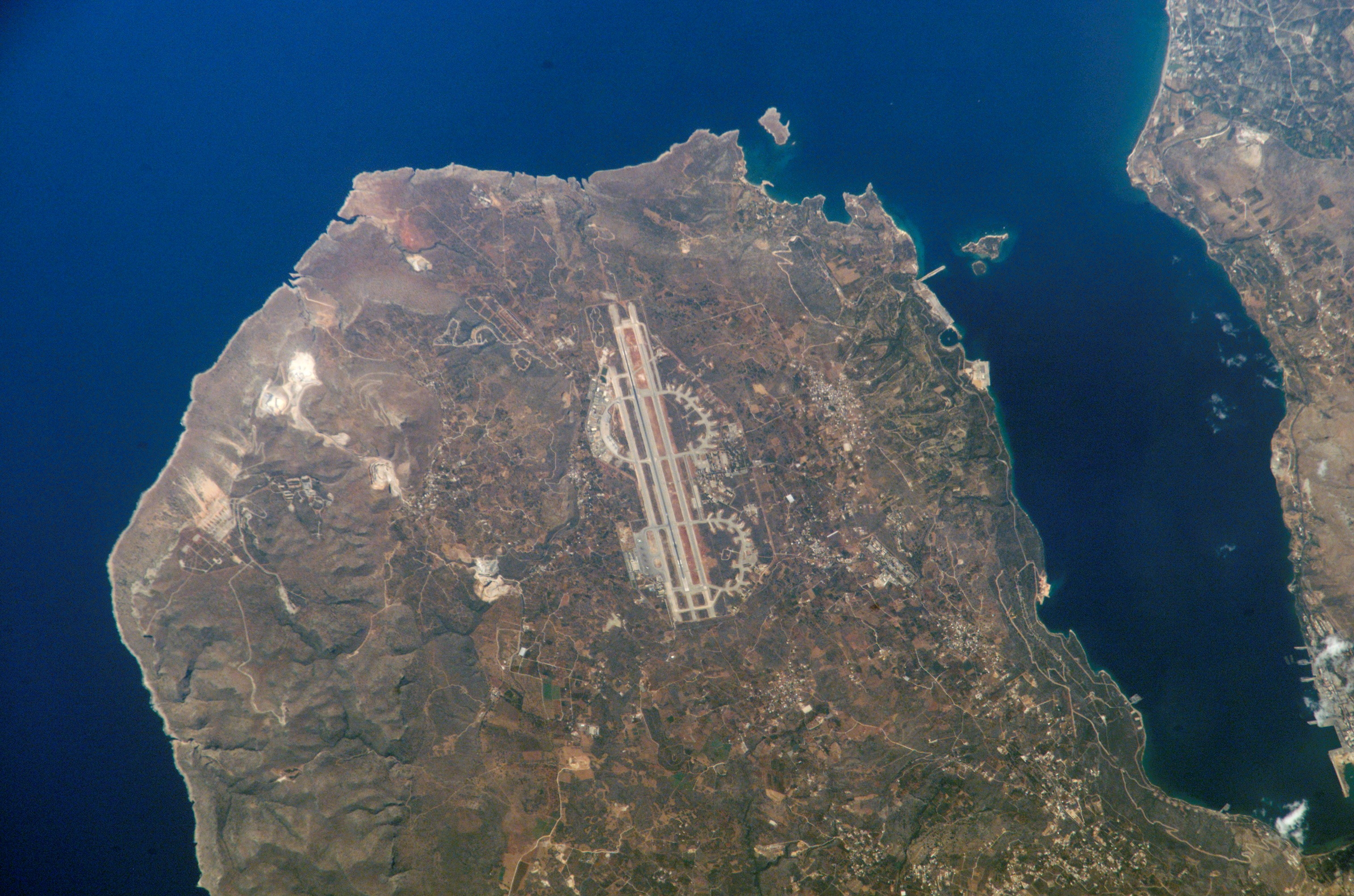
Aerial view

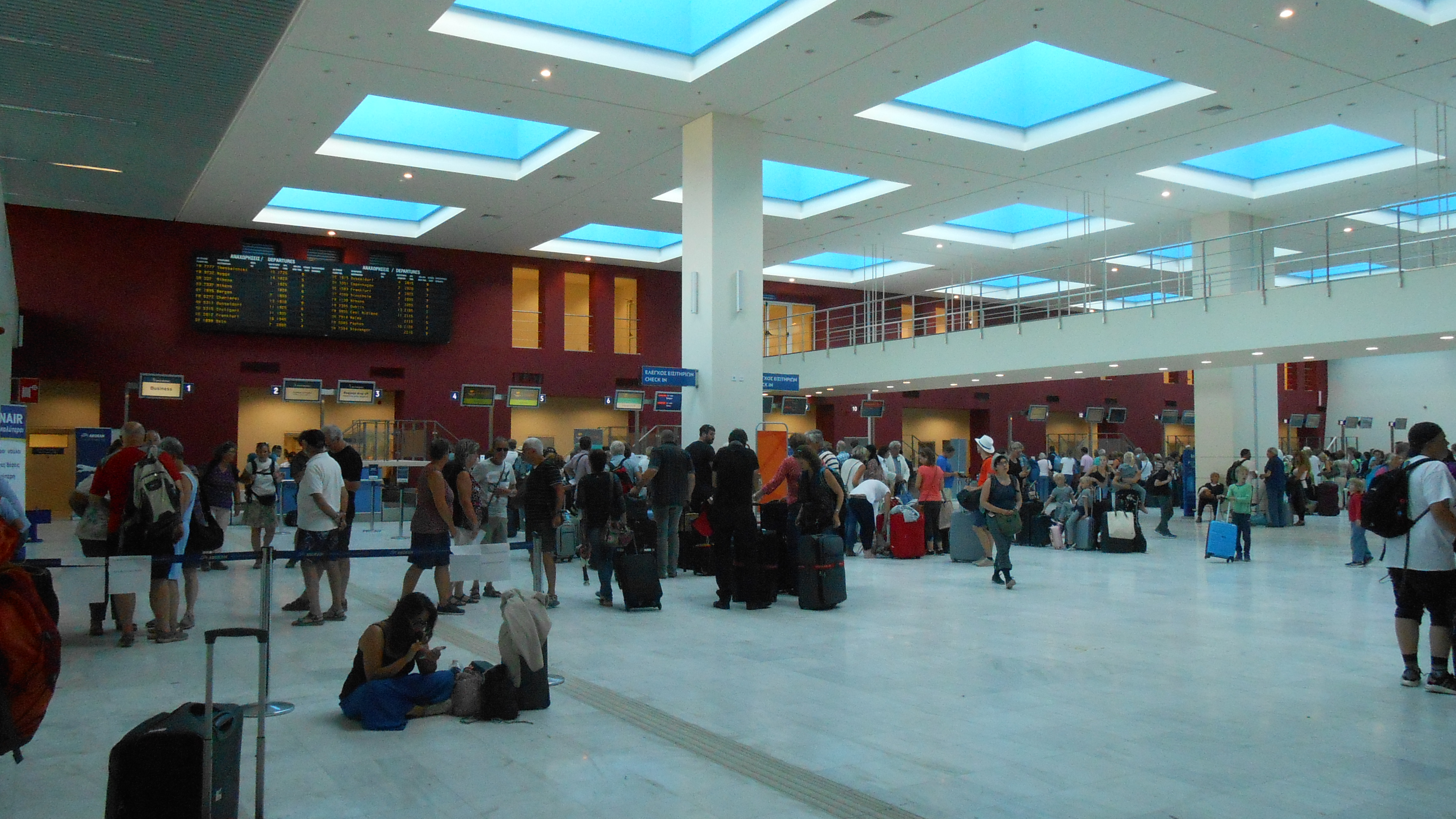
Terminal interior

The focus on civil aviation for the west of Crete has not always been on the current location. It was the airport of Maleme that served civil flights up to 1959, and dating back to the end of Second World War.

In 1959, this activity was transferred to the military airport of Souda. In 1974, the airport also began to serve international flights. Because of insufficient capacity, there was the need for a new terminal building. Eventually, in 1996, the new terminal was ready, measuring a surface area of 14,650 square metres (157,700 sq ft), with 6 aircraft stands in front. It has a design capacity of 1.35 million passengers per year. In 2000, it was officially named Ioannis Daskalogiannis.

The airport is also intensively used as a military airfield by the Hellenic Air Force.

In December 2015, the privatisation of Chania International Airport and 13 other regional airports of Greece was finalised with the signing of the agreement between the Fraport AG/Copelouzos Group joint venture and the state privatisation fund. According to the agreement, the joint venture will operate the 14 airports (including Chania International Airport) for 40 years as of 11 April 2017.

In June 2018 Fraport Greece completed the new aircraft layouts, which are now using push back to double the parking space. The passenger safety area has been expanded, the number of hand baggage scanners from 5 to 8, the duty-free store space tripled from 400 sq.m. to 1,200 sq. meters, the VIP space moved to increase the number of boarding gates from 14 to 16 and the dividing walls in the departure halls were removed in order to create a space of 3,000 sq. meters. A new sewage pumping station was built, and the network (approximately 3.5 km) was connected to the municipal network. Electromechanical installations, including new motor control centres (MCCs), wiring, lighting, and electrical panels, were optimized. The apron lighting was upgraded, and the water closets (WCs) were renovated to increase the number of toilets in the non-Schengen area. Additionally, the escalator was relocated to better utilize the available space.

On 10 June 2018, Air Force One carrying U.S. President Donald Trump stopped for refuelling in Chania during Trump's flight from the G7 meeting in Quebec to the meeting in Singapore with the leader of North Korea Kim Jong-un.

== Fraport Greece's investment plan ==
On 22 March 2017, Fraport Greece presented its master plan for the 14 Greek regional airports, including Chania International Airport.

== Airlines and destinations ==
The following airlines operate regular scheduled and charter flights at Chania Airport:

Airlines	Destinations
Aegean Airlines	Athens, Thessaloniki; Seasonal: Rhodes
Air Serbia	Seasonal: Belgrade
Animawings	Seasonal: Bucharest–Otopeni
Austrian Airlines	Seasonal: Vienna
BlueBird Airways	Seasonal: Tel Aviv
British Airways	Seasonal: London–Gatwick, London–Heathrow
Brussels Airlines	Seasonal: Brussels
Condor	Seasonal: Frankfurt, Hamburg, Münster/Osnabrück (begins 7 May 2027)
Discover Airlines	Seasonal: Frankfurt, Munich
easyJet	Seasonal: Amsterdam, Basel/Mulhouse, Berlin, Bristol, Geneva, Glasgow, London–Gatwick, London–Luton, Lyon, Manchester, Milan–Malpensa, Nantes, Nice
Edelweiss Air	Seasonal: Zurich
Eurowings	Seasonal: Düsseldorf, Graz, Hamburg, Stuttgart
Finnair	Seasonal: Helsinki
Jet2.com	Seasonal: Birmingham, Bristol, East Midlands, Edinburgh (begins 5 May 2027), Leeds/Bradford, London–Stansted, Manchester, Newcastle upon Tyne
Luxair	Seasonal: Luxembourg
Neos	Seasonal: Milan–Malpensa
Norwegian Air Shuttle	Seasonal: Bergen, Billund, Copenhagen, Oslo, Stockholm–Arlanda
Ryanair	Seasonal: Athens, Bergamo, Birmingham, Bologna, Bournemouth, Bucharest–Otopeni, Budapest, Charleroi, Dublin, East Midlands, Gdańsk, Hahn, Kraków, Leeds/Bradford, London–Stansted, Malta, Manchester, Marseille, Memmingen, Naples, Newcastle upon Tyne, Pisa, Poznań, Rome–Fiumicino, Sofia, Stockholm–Arlanda, Thessaloniki, Vienna, Warsaw–Modlin, Weeze, Wrocław
Scandinavian Airlines	Seasonal: Copenhagen, Oslo, Stockholm–Arlanda
Sky Express	Athens, Thessaloniki; Seasonal charter: Brno
Smartwings	Seasonal: Prague; Seasonal charter: Debrecen, Poznan
Transavia	Seasonal: Amsterdam, Lyon, Paris–Orly
TUI Airways	Seasonal: Birmingham, London–Gatwick
TUI fly Belgium	Seasonal: Brussels, Ostend/Bruges
TUI fly Netherlands	Seasonal: Amsterdam
Wizz Air	Seasonal: Belgrade, London–Luton, Rome–Fiumicino, Warsaw–Chopin

== Statistics ==
The data are from Hellenic Civil Aviation Authority (CAA) until 2016, and from 2017 and later from the official website of the airport.

Year	Passengers		
Year	Domestic	International	Total
1994	204,360	621,986	826,346
1995	▲220,910	▲669,516	▲890,426
1996	▲244,146	▼587,106	▼831,252
1997	▲301,471	▲622,689	▲924,160
1998	▼292,504	▲676,687	▲969,191
1999	▲414,429	▲816,045	▲1,230,474
2000	▲515,093	▲901,710	▲1,416,803
2001	▼395,864	▲1,033,118	▲1,428,982
2002	▼331,521	▲1,053,058	▼1,384,579
2003	▲413,541	▲1,066,112	▲1,479,653
2004	▼382,224	▼1,064,153	▼1,446,377
2005	▲401,141	▲1,111,628	▲1,512,769
2006	▲437,403	▲1,323,556	▲1,760,959
2007	▲514,318	▲1,368,516	▲1,882,834
2008	▲522,658	▼1,343,923	▼1,866,581
2009	▲575,687	▼1,219,779	▼1,795,466
2010	▼468,279	▼1,186,585	▼1,654,864
2011	▼449,211	▲1,325,497	▲1,774,708
2012	▼397,661	▲1,435,313	▲1,832,974
2013	▼379,280	▲1,699,577	▲2,078,857
2014	▲578,286	▲1,869,280	▲2,447,566
2015	▲827,190	▲1,875,093	▲2,702,283
2016	▲881,031	▲2,085,666	▲2,966,697
2017	▼831,324	▲2,111,085	▲3,042,409
2018	▼646,723	▲2,361,964	▼3,008,687
2019	▲672,945	▼2,310,597	▼2,983,542
2020	▼295.385	▼408.097	▼703.482
2021	▲454,298	▲1,340,938	▲1,795,236
2022	▲678,845	▲2,611,957	▲3,290,802
2023	▲828,793	▲2,819,623	▲3,648,416
2024	▲896,324	▲3,055,802	▲3,952,126
2025(Oct)	▲830,982	▲3,161,167	▲3,992,149

=== Traffic statistics by country (2024) ===
Traffic by country at Chania International Airport – 2024
Place	Country	Total passengers
1	Greece	896,324
2	United Kingdom	536,408
3	Germany	370,694
4	Denmark	331,608
5	Poland	302,324
6	Norway	299,407
7	Sweden	239,004
8	Finland	215,089
9	Italy	110,956
10	France	97,794
11	Belgium	81,177
12	Austria	65,685
13	Cyprus	64,266
14	Romania	63,143
15	Hungary	58,854

== Aviation research ==
Since 2021, the Crete Aviation Observatory (CAO) has conducted research on aviation activity at Chania International Airport, including passenger and aircraft traffic, airline operations, route connectivity, source markets and passenger surveys.

== Ground transport ==
The airport can be easily reached by car, bus (to Chania and Rethymnon) or taxi via the main road network.

== See also ==
- List of airports in Crete
- List of the busiest airports in Greece
- Transport in Greece
