= Santorini International Airport =

International airport in Greece

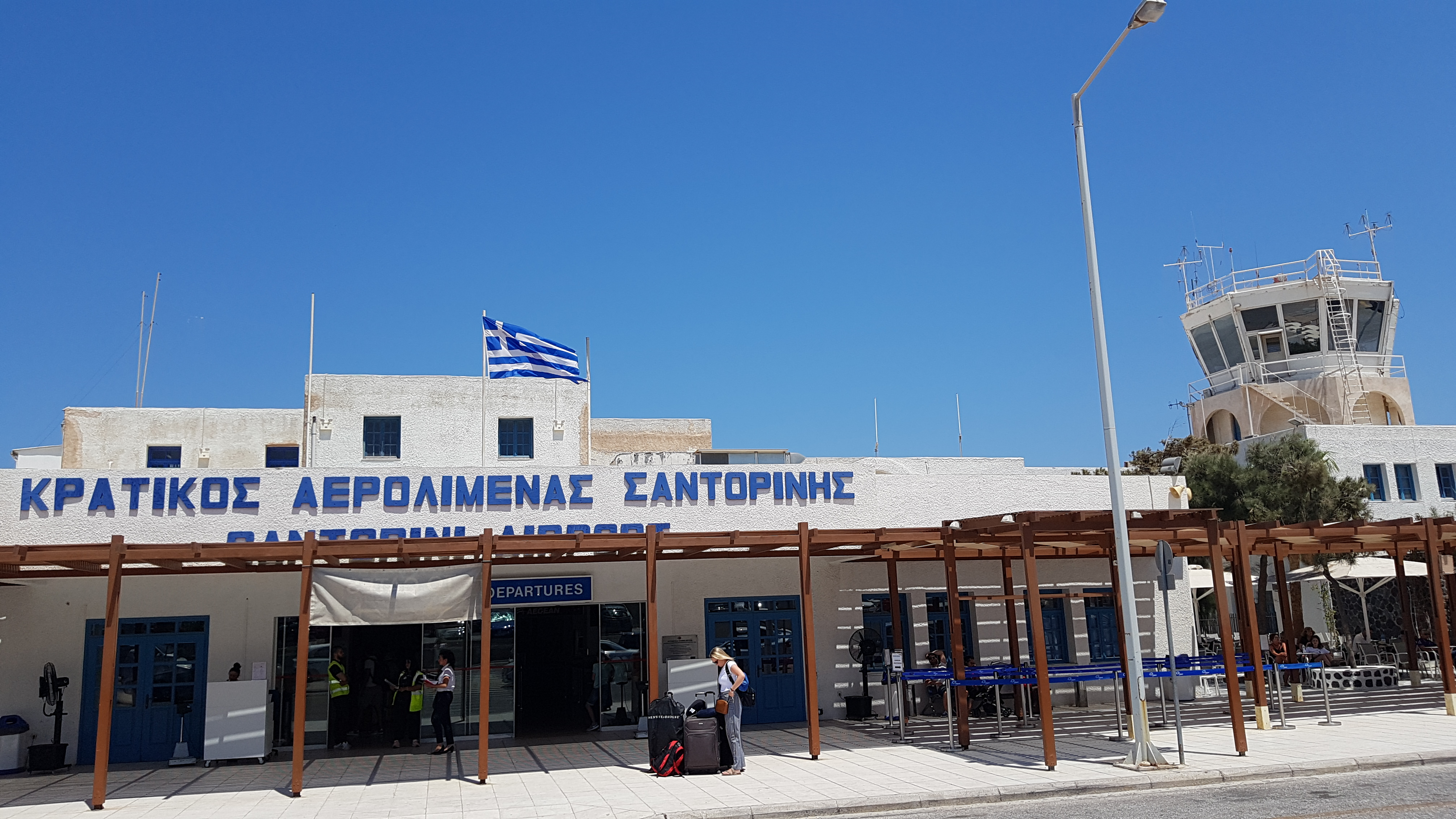
- Airport entrance in 2019, before renovations completed in 2021
- IATA: JTR; ICAO: LGSR

Summary
- Airport type: Public
- Owner: Greek State
- Operator: Fraport AG/Copelouzos Group joint venture
- Serves: Santorini
- Location: Kamari
- Elevation AMSL: 127 ft (39 m)
- Coordinates: 36°24′03″N 025°28′42″E
- Website: jtr-airport.gr

Map
- Location of airport in Greece

Runways
Direction	Length		Surface
Direction	ft	m	Surface
15/33	7,208	2,197	Asphalt

Statistics (2024)
- Passengers: 2,877,122
- Passenger traffic change: ▲3.7%
- Aircraft movements: 23,676
- Aircraft movements change: ▲1.9%
- Runway Statistics

Santorini International Airport (Greek: Διεθνής Αερολιμένας Σαντορίνης) (IATA: JTR, ICAO: LGSR) is an airport in Santorini, Greece, located north of the village of Kamari. The airport serves as both a military and a civil airport. With its redesigned apron, as of 2021 the airport is able to serve up to nine civilian airliners at the same time. Santorini is one of the few Cyclades Islands with a major airport.

The airport is located about 6 kilometres (3.7 mi) southeast of the centre of the city of Thira. The main asphalt runway (15/33) is 7,208 feet (2,197 m) in length. The parallel taxiway was built and marked to runway specification but is now marked and lighted as a taxiway. The airfield can accommodate medium-sized jets like the Boeing 757, Boeing 737 and Airbus A320 series as well as smaller aircraft such as the Avro RJ, Fokker 70, and ATR 72. Scheduled airlines include Ryanair, Olympic Air and Aegean Airlines, with seasonal scheduled and charter flights from other airlines during the higher seasons in spring, summer and autumn. Transportation to and from the air terminal is via buses, taxis, hotel car-pickups and hired cars.

== History ==
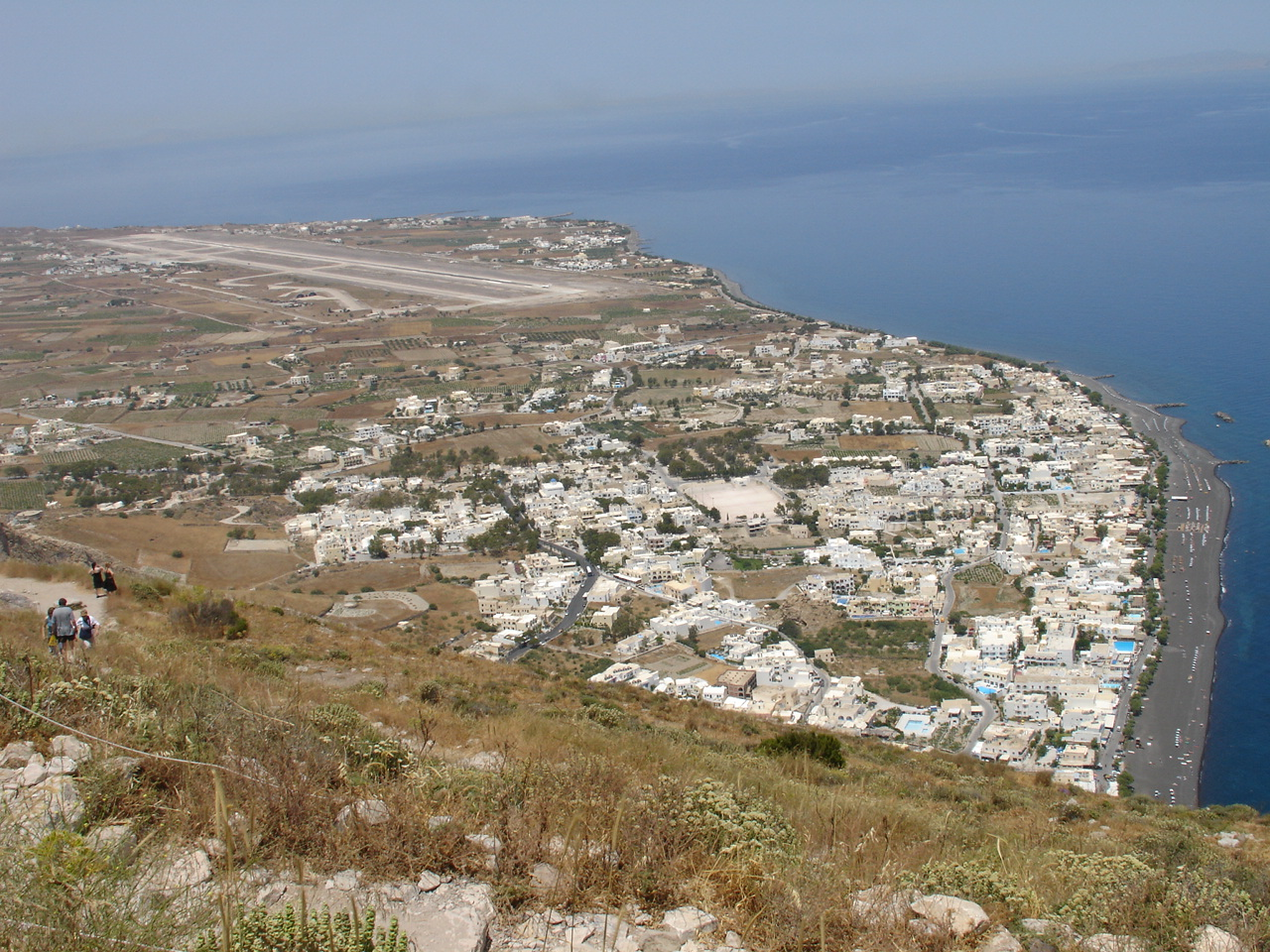
Kamari town and Santorini International Airport

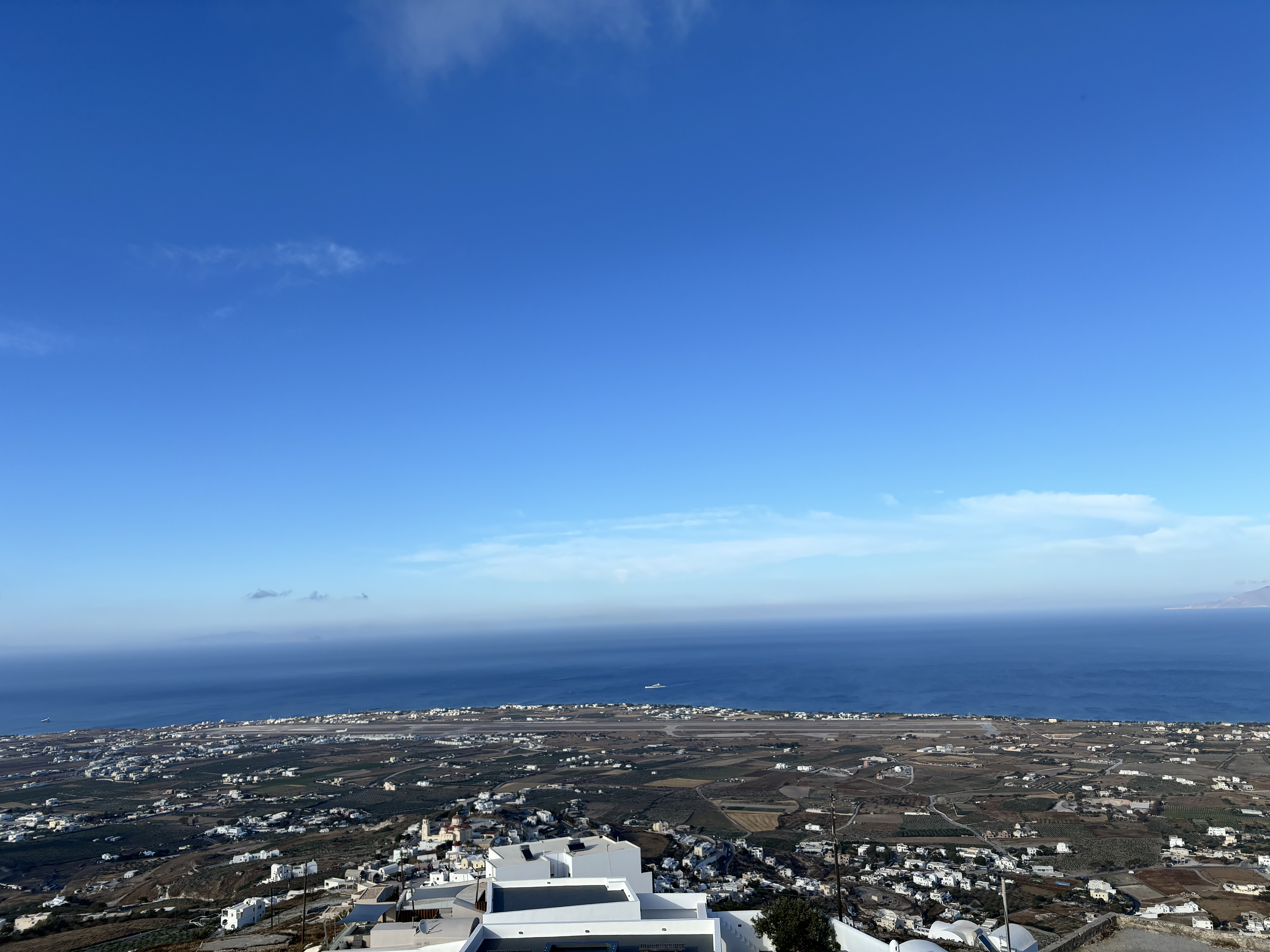
The airport as seen from Pyrgos Kallistis in May 2024

The airport first operated in 1972.

In December 2015 the privatisation of Santorini International Airport and 13 other regional airports of Greece was finalised with the signing of the agreement between the Fraport AG/Copelouzos Group joint venture and the state privatisation fund. According to the agreement, the joint venture will operate the 14 airports (including Santorini International Airport) for 40 years as of 11 April 2017.

== Airlines and destinations ==
The following airlines operate regular scheduled and charter flights at Santorini Airport:

Airlines	Destinations
Aegean Airlines	Athens; Seasonal: Heraklion, Istanbul, Rhodes, Thessaloniki
Aer Lingus	Seasonal: Dublin
Aeroitalia	Seasonal: Salerno
Air France	Seasonal: Paris–Charles de Gaulle
AirBaltic	Seasonal: Riga
Air Serbia	Seasonal: Belgrade
Austrian Airlines	Seasonal: Vienna
Bluebird Airways	Seasonal: Tel Aviv
British Airways	Seasonal: London–Heathrow
Cyprus Airways	Seasonal: Larnaca
Discover Airlines	Seasonal: Frankfurt, Munich
EasyJet	Seasonal: Bristol, Geneva, London–Gatwick, Manchester, Milan–Malpensa, Naples, Nice
Edelweiss Air	Seasonal: Zürich
Etihad Airways	Seasonal: Abu Dhabi
Eurowings	Seasonal: Cologne/Bonn, Düsseldorf, Hamburg, Stuttgart
Finnair	Seasonal: Helsinki
Flydubai	Seasonal: Dubai–International
Flynas	Seasonal: Riyadh
Gulf Air	Seasonal: Bahrain
Iberia Express	Seasonal: Madrid
Israir	Seasonal: Tel Aviv
Jet2.com	Seasonal: Birmingham, Edinburgh, Leeds/Bradford (begins 6 May 2027), London–Stansted, Manchester
Lufthansa	Seasonal: Munich
Luxair	Seasonal: Luxembourg
Neos	Seasonal: Milan–Malpensa, Verona
Norwegian Air Shuttle	Seasonal: Copenhagen, Oslo, Stockholm–Arlanda
Ryanair	Seasonal: Athens, Bari, Dublin, Gdańsk, Kraków, London–Stansted, Milan Bergamo, Milan–Malpensa, Naples, Rome–Fiumicino, Vienna
Scandinavian Airlines	Seasonal: Copenhagen Oslo; Seasonal charter: Stockholm–Arlanda
Sky Express	Athens
Smartwings	Seasonal: Prague
Swiss International Air Lines	Seasonal: Geneva
Transavia	Seasonal: Amsterdam, Brussels, Lyon, Nantes, Paris–Orly
TUI Airways	Seasonal: Manchester
TUI fly Belgium	Seasonal: Brussels
Volotea	Seasonal: Bari, Marseille, Naples, Palermo, Venice
Vueling	Seasonal: Barcelona
Wizz Air	Seasonal: Bucharest–Otopeni, Budapest, London–Gatwick, Naples, Rome–Fiumicino, Warsaw–Chopin

== Statistics ==
The data are from Hellenic Civil Aviation Authority (CAA) until 2016, and from the airport's official website from 2017 thereafter.

Santorini Airport Passenger Traffic
Year	Domestic passengers	Domestic % change	International passengers	International % change	Total passengers	Total % change
1994	175,152	n/a	225,896	n/a	401,048	n/a
1995	188,461	7.6 ▲	257,978	14.2 ▲	446,439	11.3 ▲
1996	188,778	0.2 ▲	246,680	4.4 ▼	435,458	2.5 ▼
1997	208,195	10.3 ▲	263,735	6.9 ▲	471,930	8.4 ▲
1998	209,505	0.6 ▲	286,809	8.8 ▲	496,314	5.2 ▲
1999	225,160	7.5 ▲	353,193	23.2 ▲	578,353	16.5 ▲
2000	302,072	34.2 ▲	373,428	5.7 ▲	675,500	16.8 ▲
2001	288,084	4.6 ▼	387,659	3.8 ▲	675,743	<0.1 ▲
2002	221,040	23.3 ▼	357,797	7.7 ▼	578,837	14.3 ▼
2003	207,695	6.0 ▼	326,232	8.8 ▼	533,927	7.8 ▼
2004	245,577	18.2 ▲	302,564	7.3 ▼	548,141	2.7 ▲
2005	269,371	9.7 ▲	341,913	13.0 ▲	611,284	11.5 ▲
2006	316,973	17.7 ▲	361,262	5.7 ▲	678,235	11.0 ▲
2007	359,950	13.6 ▲	386,724	7.1 ▲	746,674	10.1 ▲
2008	360,670	0.2 ▲	371,484	3.9 ▼	732,154	2.0 ▼
2009	356,040	1.3 ▼	343,068	7.7 ▼	699,108	4.5 ▼
2010	354,872	0.3 ▼	367,283	7.1 ▲	722,155	3.3 ▲
2011	377,473	6.4 ▲	408,074	11.1 ▲	785,547	8.8 ▲
2012	358,468	5.0 ▼	405,071	0.7 ▼	763,539	2.8 ▼
2013	403,687	12.6 ▲	494,466	22.1 ▲	898,153	17.6 ▲
2014	548,274	35.8 ▲	631,534	27.7 ▲	1,179,808	31.4 ▲
2015	771,193	40.7 ▲	724,697	14.8 ▲	1,495,890	26.8 ▲
2016	897,231	16.3 ▲	788,464	8.8 ▲	1,685,695	12.7 ▲
2017	1,022,117	13.9 ▲	908,894	12.3 ▲	1,928,295	13.1 ▲
2018	1,186,904	16.1 ▲	1,068,022	17.5 ▲	2,254,926	16.8 ▲
2019	1,228,840	3.5 ▲	1,071,568	0.3 ▲	2,300,408	2.0 ▲
2020	283,764	76.9 ▼	289,199	73.0 ▼	572,963	75.1 ▼
2021	561,780	98.0 ▲	984,804	240.5 ▲	1,546,584	169.9 ▲
2022	1,061,360	88.9 ▲	1,683,290	70.9 ▲	2,744,650	77.5 ▲
2023	1,259,564	18.7 ▲	1,516,241	9.9 ▼	2,775,805	1.1 ▲
2024	1,336,326	5.9 ▲	1,543,796	1.8 ▲	2,877,122	3.7 ▲
2025	1,085,988	18.6 ▼	1,332,231	13.7 ▼	2,418,219	16.0 ▼

=== Traffic statistics by country (2022) ===
Traffic by country at Santorini International Airport – 2022
Place	Country	Total passengers
1	Greece	1,061,360
2	United Kingdom	422,668
3	Italy	396,526
4	France	247,123
5	Germany	140,725
6	Poland	55,916
7	Switzerland	48,951
8	Spain	44,869
9	Austria	33,428
10	Netherlands	33,181
11	Ireland	32,591
12	Romania	29,597
13	Israel	28,016
14	United Arab Emirates	21,316
15	Norway	17,619

== See also ==
- Transport in Greece
