= Mykonos Airport =

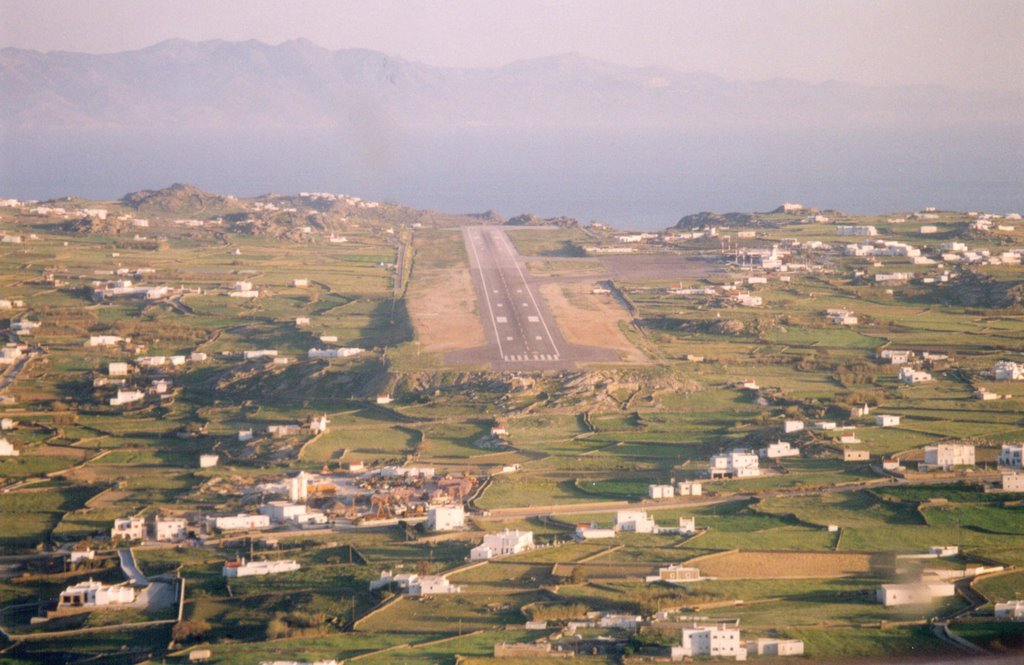
- IATA: JMK; ICAO: LGMK; WMO: 16750

Summary
- Airport type: Public
- Owner: Fraport AG
- Operator: Fraport Greece
- Serves: Mykonos
- Location: Mykonos Island, Greece
- Elevation AMSL: 405 ft (123 m)
- Coordinates: 37°26′06.46″N 025°20′53.17″E
- Website: jmk-airport.gr

Map
- Location of airport in Greece

Runways
Direction	Length		Surface
Direction	ft	m	Surface
16/34	6,244	1,903	Asphalt

Statistics (2022)
- Passengers: 1,688,037
- Passenger traffic change: ▲60.4%
- Aircraft movements: 19,421
- Aircraft movements change: ▲19.2%
- Runway Statistics

Mykonos-Manto Mavrogenous Airport (IATA: JMK, ICAO: LGMK) is the international airport of the Greek island of Mykonos, located 4 kilometres (2.5 mi) from the town of Mykonos. It serves flights to domestic and European metropolitan destinations due to the island being a popular leisure destination.

== History ==
The airport first operated in 1971.

During the off-peak tourist season the airport has limited flight connections and operating hours. On the other hand, during the 2014 peak summer season it was found necessary to severely limit general aviation activity, allowing only a technical stop of 2 hours. For the summer of 2016, NOTAM B0335/16 introduces a similar limitation, but now even down to a one hour's stop.

In December 2015, the privatisation of Mykonos International Airport and 13 other regional airports of Greece was finalised with the signing of the agreement between the Fraport AG/Copelouzos Group joint venture and the state privatisation fund. "We signed the deal today," the head of Greece's privatisation agency HRADF, Stergios Pitsiorlas, told Reuters. According to the agreement, the joint venture will operate the 14 airports (including Mykonos International Airport) for 40 years.

Fraport started managing the airport from 11 April 2017. On 22 March 2017, the Fraport-Greece presented its master plan for the 14 regional airports including the Mykonos Airport. Immediate actions that will be implemented at the airports as soon as Fraport Greece takes over operations before the launch of the Summer 2017 season include general clean-up, decrease wait times to check in and reduce flight delays, upgrading sanitary facilities as well as enhancing services and offering new free Internet connection (WiFi).

== Airlines and destinations ==
The following airlines operate regular scheduled and charter flights at Mykonos Airport:

Airlines	Destinations
Aegean Airlines	Athens; Seasonal: Heraklion, Istanbul, Rhodes, Thessaloniki
Aeroitalia	Seasonal: Salerno
Air France	Seasonal: Paris–Charles de Gaulle
Air Serbia	Seasonal: Belgrade
airHaifa	Seasonal: Haifa
Arkia	Seasonal: Tel Aviv
Austrian Airlines	Seasonal: Vienna
Bluebird Airways	Seasonal: Tel Aviv
British Airways	Seasonal: London–Heathrow
Discover Airlines	Seasonal: Frankfurt, Munich
EasyJet	Seasonal: Geneva, London–Gatwick, Manchester, Milan–Malpensa, Naples, Nice
Edelweiss Air	Seasonal: Zürich
Etihad Airways	Seasonal: Abu Dhabi
Eurowings	Seasonal: Düsseldorf, Stuttgart
Flydubai	Seasonal: Dubai–International
Flynas	Seasonal: Riyadh
Gulf Air	Seasonal: Bahrain
Iberia Express	Seasonal: Madrid
ITA Airways	Seasonal: Rome–Fiumicino
Kuwait Airways	Seasonal: Kuwait City
Lufthansa	Seasonal: Munich
Luxair	Seasonal: Luxembourg
Middle East Airlines	Seasonal: Beirut
Neos	Seasonal: Bologna, Milan–Malpensa, Rome–Fiumicino, Verona
Qatar Airways	Seasonal: Doha
Ryanair	Seasonal: Bologna, Budapest, Naples, Paphos, Vienna
Saudia	Seasonal: Riyadh
Sky Express	Athens; Seasonal: Thessaloniki
Sundor	Seasonal: Tel Aviv
Swiss International Air Lines	Seasonal: Geneva
Transavia	Seasonal: Amsterdam, Lyon, Paris–Orly
TUI fly Belgium	Seasonal: Brussels
Volotea	Seasonal: Naples
Vueling	Seasonal: Barcelona
Wizz Air	Seasonal: Bucharest–Otopeni, London–Luton, Rome–Fiumicino

== Statistics ==
The annual passenger traffic data is sourced from the Hellenic Civil Aviation Authority (CAA) until 2016 and from 2017 and later from the official website of the airport.

Year	Passengers		
Year	Domestic	International	Total
1994	154,288	91,419	245,707
1995	▼153,417	▲98,120	▲251,537
1996	▲157,425	▲101,311	▲258,736
1997	▲165,719	▲131,203	▲296,922
1998	▼155,022	▲158,365	▲313,387
1999	▼145,362	▲177,615	▲322,977
2000	▲171,407	▲192,872	▲364,279
2001	▼148,257	▲197,864	▼346,121
2002	▲156,177	▼186,372	▼342,549
2003	▼154,116	▲195,203	▲349,319
2004	▲174,632	▼162,043	▼336,675
2005	▲178,198	▲191,488	▲369,686
2006	▲201,113	▲195,149	▲396,262
2007	▲219,860	▲207,598	▲427,458
2008	▼214,436	▼204,487	▼418,923
2009	▲240,461	▼187,989	▲428,450
2010	▼213,852	▲218,603	▲432,455
2011	▲224,125	▲258,684	▲482,809
2012	▲225,789	▲276,154	▲501,943
2013	▲233,949	▲350,610	▲584,559
2014	▲287,265	▲491,464	▲778,729
2015	▲322,901	▲553,156	▲876,057
2016	▲392,525	▲606,501	▲999,026
2017	▲475,578	▲731,448	▲1,207,026
2018	▲508,676	▲887,111	▲1,395,787
2019	▲524,877	▲995,268	▲1,520,145
2020	▼132,546	▼276,514	▼409,060
2021	▲284,008	▲768,072	▲1,052,080
2022	▲490,304	▲1,197,733	▲1,688,037
2023	▲531,607	▼1,127,580	▼1,659,187
2024	▲543,755	▼1,069,883	▼1,613,638
2025	▼491,083	▲1,090,659	▼1,581,742

=== Traffic statistics by country (2024) ===
Traffic by country at Mykonos Airport – 2024
Place	Country	Total passengers
1	Greece	543,755
2	Italy	317,209
3	United Kingdom	205,988
4	France	157,628
5	Switzerland	75,883
6	Germany	70,106
7	Austria	52,414
8	Spain	36,009
9	Israel	35,592
10	Netherlands	31,094
11	Cyprus	18,712
12	United Arab Emirates	17,310
13	Romania	15,475
14	Hungary	12,170
15	Qatar	10,325

== Ground transport ==
The transfer time from the town to the airport is about 10 minutes.

Transit bus service is provided between the Airport and the city of Mykonos (Chora) and other destinations, (only during summer season).

By Car : Mykonos Airport is located 3.5 km from the city of Mykonos (Chora) and is easily accessible via Mykonos provincial road. The journey to and from the city centre takes about 10 minutes. Ornos, Psarrou, Platis Gialos are 3.5 km away from the airport and the journey from the Airport takes about 10–15 minutes.

By Taxi : 24/7 taxi service is available outside the Mykonos Airport Terminal building. The journey from the Airport to the city of Mykonos (Chora) is about 10 minutes and costs 20€ (2022).

== See also ==
- Transport in Greece
