= Heraklion International Airport "Nikos Kazantzakis" =

International airport serving Heraklion, Crete, Greece

Heraklion International Airport "Nikos Kazantzakis" Διεθνής Αερολιμένας Ηρακλείου "Νίκος Καζαντζάκης"
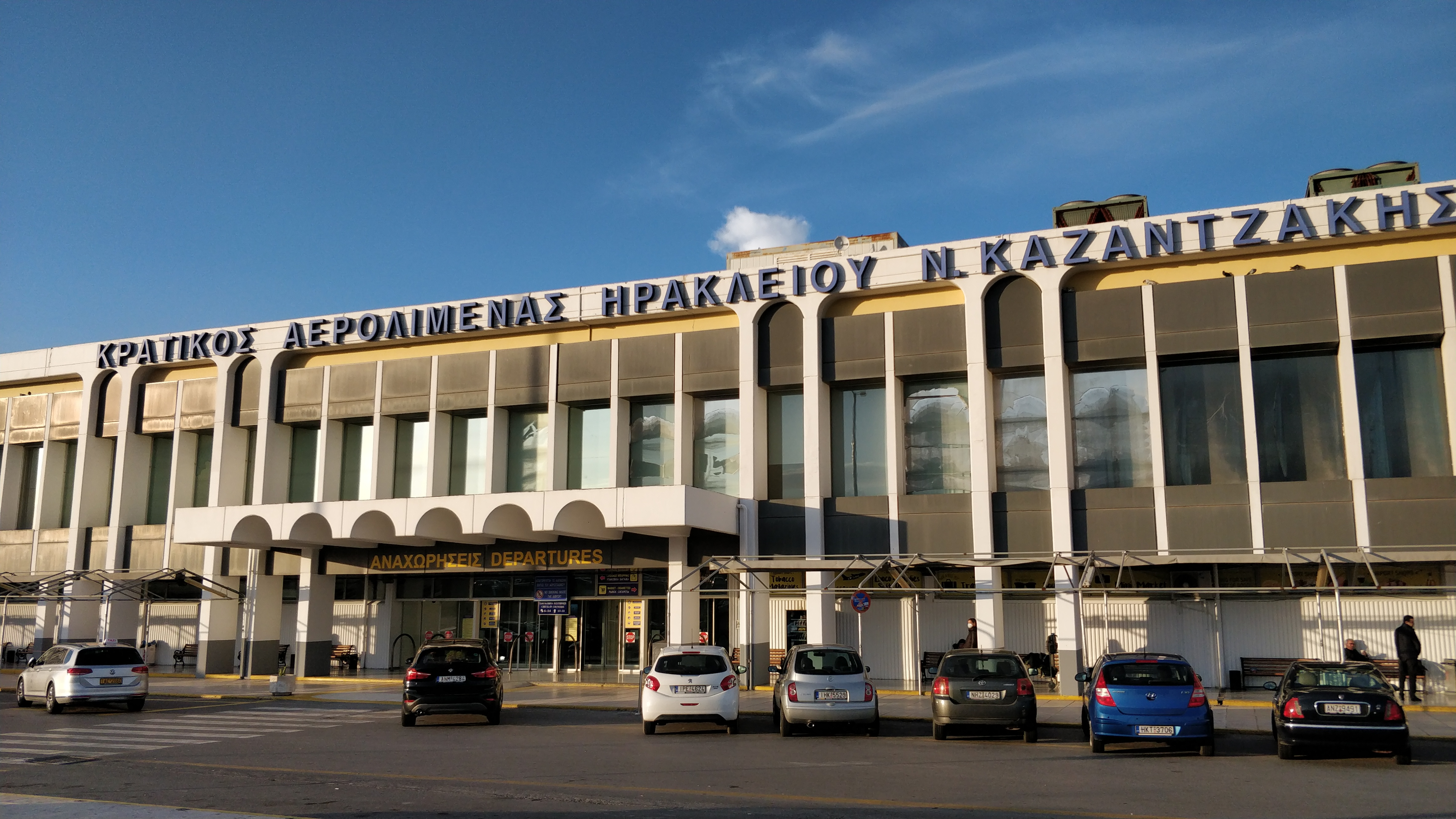
- IATA: HER; ICAO: LGIR

Summary
- Airport type: Public / military
- Owner: Greek State
- Serves: Heraklion
- Location: Heraklion, Crete, Greece
- Opened: March 1939
- Hub for: Bluebird Airways; Sky Express
- Focus city for: Aegean Airlines (Seasonal); Animawings (Seasonal, from 3 June 2025)
- Elevation AMSL: 115 ft (35 m)
- Coordinates: 35°20′23″N 25°10′49″E
- Website: www.heraklion-airport.gr

Map
- Location of airport in Greece

Runways
Direction	Length		Surface
Direction	m	ft	Surface
09/27	2,714	8,800	Asphalt
12/30	1,566	5,138	Asphalt

Statistics (2025)
- Passengers: 10,033,151
- Passenger traffic change: ▲6.9
- Aircraft movements: 66,996
- Aircraft movements change: ▲9.1%
- Sources: Hellenic Civil Aviation Authority

Heraklion International Airport "Nikos Kazantzakis" (IATA: HER, ICAO: LGIR) is the primary airport on the island of Crete, Greece, and the country's second busiest airport after Athens International Airport. It is located about 5 km (3.1 mi) east of the main city centre of Heraklion, near the municipality of Nea Alikarnassos. It is a shared civil/military facility. The airport is named after Heraklion native Nikos Kazantzakis, a Greek writer and philosopher. Nikos Kazantzakis Airport is Crete's main and busiest airport, serving Heraklion (Ηράκλειο), Aghios Nikolaos (Άγιος Νικόλαος), Malia (Mάλλια), Hersonissos (Χερσόνησος), Stalida (Σταλίδα), Sisi (Σίσι) Elounda (Ελούντα) and other resorts.

A new airport for Heraklion, located 39 km (24 mi) to the south-east of the city at Kasteli, is under construction and due to open by 2027. Once completed, the new Kasteli International Airport will replace the current Heraklion International Airport as the hub for central Crete, but also providing international links for all of Crete.

== History ==
The airport first opened in March 1939. At that time, this was merely a piece of flat agricultural land. The first aeroplane (a Junkers Ju 52) carried the initial passengers to the site. During the Second World War, the airfield was the site of the Battle of Heraklion during the Battle of Crete, in 1941. Civilian operations ceased; but in the autumn of 1946, traffic resumed, introducing the DC-3 aircraft.

At first, the airport only offered very basic service, with only primitive installations on the site in the form of three tents, smoke for wind determination, and storm lamps for runway lighting.

In 1947, the first (small) terminal was erected. Hellenic Airlines started commercial flights in 1948. At that time, a total of 4,000 people were served. The year 1953 saw the construction of a paved runway which was initially 1,850 meters long and oriented as 09/27. The next major event followed in 1954, when a four-engined DC-4 aircraft landed for the first time at the airport. In that year, the airport handled approximately 18,000 passengers. From 1957 onward, the new Olympic Airways used the airport, starting services with the DC-6 aircraft.

From 1968 until 1971, the runway was extended to 2,680 m (8,790 ft) and a new terminal and other facilities were constructed, essentially making it a new airport. On 18 March 1971, the first charter flight from abroad operated to the airport. The new airport itself was officially inaugurated on 5 May 1972.

In 2025, farmers protesting against the delayed payment of European Union subsidies occupied the airport's apron, resulting in disruptions to aviation.

The airport is scheduled to cease operations in 2027 and to be replaced by the (expanded and renamed) Kasteli Airport.

== Terminal extension ==
The latest airport expansion projects began in October 2017.

The latest extension began in October 2017 and was completed on 30 March 2018, in time for the airport's high season.

== Airlines and destinations ==
The following airlines operate regular scheduled and charter flights at Heraklion Airport:

Airlines	Destinations
Aegean Airlines	Athens, Istanbul, Larnaca, Munich, Rhodes, Thessaloniki, Tirana; Seasonal: Alexandroupoli, Corfu, Frankfurt, Kalamata, Kos, Metz/Nancy, Mykonos, Mytilene, Naxos, Paris–Charles de Gaulle, Paros, Rome–Fiumicino, Santorini, Syros, Tel Aviv, Zurich; Seasonal charter: Friedrichshafen, Memmingen, Münster/Osnabrück, Pristina
Aer Lingus	Seasonal: Dublin
Air Astana	Seasonal: Almaty
Air Serbia	Seasonal: Belgrade
airBaltic	Seasonal: Riga, Tallinn, Vilnius
airHaifa	Seasonal: Haifa
Animawings	Seasonal: Bucharest–Otopeni, Cluj-Napoca, Oradea, Suceava, Timișoara
Austrian Airlines	Seasonal: Vienna
Avion Express	Seasonal charter: Vilnius
Azerbaijan Airlines	Seasonal: Baku
BlueBird Airways	Tel Aviv
British Airways	Seasonal: London–Gatwick, London–Heathrow
Brussels Airlines	Seasonal: Brussels
Bulgaria Air	Seasonal: Sofia
Chair Airlines	Seasonal: Zurich
Condor	Seasonal: Berlin, Frankfurt, Hamburg, Munich, Münster/Osnabrück (begins 1 May 2027), Stuttgart
Corendon Airlines	Seasonal: Antalya, Berlin, Cologne/Bonn, Düsseldorf, Graz, Hannover, Hurghada, Ljubljana, London–Gatwick, Palma de Mallorca, Manchester, Münster/Osnabrück, Nuremberg, Rostock, Stuttgart, Tel Aviv, Vienna
Corendon Dutch Airlines	Seasonal: Amsterdam, Brussels, Groningen, Maastricht/Aachen
Cyprus Airways	Larnaca
Discover Airlines	Frankfurt, Munich
easyJet	Seasonal: Basel/Mulhouse, Birmingham, Bordeaux, Bristol, Edinburgh, Geneva, Liverpool, London–Gatwick, London–Luton, Lyon, Manchester, Milan–Malpensa, Nantes, Naples, Paris–Charles de Gaulle
Edelweiss Air	Seasonal: Zurich
Enter Air	Seasonal charter: Warsaw–Chopin
Eurowings	Seasonal: Berlin, Cologne/Bonn, Düsseldorf, Graz, Hamburg, Nuremberg, Prague, Salzburg, Stuttgart
FlyOne	Seasonal: Chișinău, Yerevan
Helvetic Airways	Seasonal: Bern
ITA Airways	Seasonal: Rome–Fiumicino
Jet2.com	Seasonal: Belfast–International, Birmingham, Bournemouth, Bristol, East Midlands, Glasgow, Leeds/Bradford, Liverpool, London–Gatwick, London–Luton, London–Stansted, Manchester, Newcastle upon Tyne
LEAV Aviation	Seasonal: Cologne/Bonn, Erfurt-Weimar
LOT Polish Airlines	Seasonal: Warsaw–Chopin
Lufthansa	Seasonal: Frankfurt, Munich
Luxair	Seasonal: Luxembourg
Marabu	Seasonal: Hamburg, Leipzig/Halle
Neos	Seasonal: Bergamo, Bologna, Milan–Malpensa, Rome–Fiumicino, Verona
Norwegian Air Shuttle	Seasonal: Copenhagen, Oslo
Ryanair	Seasonal: Bergamo, Berlin, Bologna, Catania, Charleroi, Milan–Malpensa, Vienna
Saudia	Seasonal: Jeddah
Scandinavian Airlines	Seasonal: Copenhagen, Oslo; Seasonal charter: Gothenburg
Sky Express	Athens, Rhodes, Thessaloniki, Tirana; Seasonal: Brussels, Larnaca, Lyon, Marseille, Paris–Charles de Gaulle, Volos; Seasonal charter: Belgrade, Bucharest–Otopeni, Cluj-Napoca, Iași, Lisbon, Košice, Oradea, Pardubice, Sibiu, Suceava, Târgu Mureș, Timisoara, Weeze
SkyUp	Seasonal: Chișinău, Katowice
Smartwings	Seasonal: Bratislava, Brno, Košice, Ostrava, Prague; Seasonal charter: České Budějovice, Debrecen, Karlovy Vary,
Sundair	Seasonal: Bremen
Sundor	Seasonal: Tel Aviv
Swiss International Air Lines	Seasonal: Geneva
Transavia	Amsterdam, Paris–Orly; Seasonal: Brussels (resumes 30 March 2027), Eindhoven, Marseille, Nantes, Rotterdam/The Hague
TUI Airways	Seasonal: Birmingham,Bournemouth, Bristol, Cardiff, East Midlands, Exeter, London–Gatwick, London–Stansted, Manchester, Newcastle upon Tyne, Norwich
TUI fly Belgium	Seasonal: Antwerp, Brussels, Ostend/Bruges
TUI fly Deutschland	Seasonal: Düsseldorf, Frankfurt, Hannover, Munich, Stuttgart
TUI fly Netherlands	Seasonal: Amsterdam, Eindhoven, Rotterdam/The Hague
Volotea	Seasonal: Bordeaux, Brest, Lille, Lyon, Marseille, Nantes, Naples, Palermo, Strasbourg, Toulouse, Verona
Vueling	Seasonal: Barcelona
Wizz Air	Seasonal: Cluj-Napoca, Sofia, Tel Aviv

== Statistics ==
=== Traffic figures ===
Historical annual traffic statistics

Year	Flights	Passengers	Passengers change (%)
2001	39,290	5,046,726	▼2.0
2002	36,664	4,791,729	▼5.1
2003	39,523	4,833,507	▲0.9
2004	38,170	4,712,508	▼2.5
2005	38,266	4,932,911	▲4.7
2006	43,740	5,345,652	▲8.4
2007	46,012	5,438,369	▲1.7
2008	45,280	5,437,068	▼0.02
2009	44,842	5,052,840	▼7.1
2010	42,396	4,907,337	▼2.9
2011	44,520	5,292,687	▲7.9
2012	40,856	5,076,329	▼4.6
2013	43,544	5,792,429	▲14.7
2014	43,637	6,024,958	▲5.2
2015	43,970	6,057,355	▲0.5
2016	47,804	6,742,746	▲11.3
2017	51,114	7,336,783	▲8.8
2018	55,680	8,098,465	▲10.4
2019	52,294	7,933,558	▼2.0
2020	20,876	2,398,264	▼69.8
2021	38,628	5,046,236	▲112.2
2022	55,549	8,099,255	▲60.5
2023	57,473	8,723,031	▲7.7
2024	62,723	9,384,233	▲7.6
2025	66,996	10,033,151	▲6.9

== Other facilities ==
The airline Bluebird Airways has its head office at the airport. Sky Express maintains a lounge at the airport.

== See also ==
- List of airports in Crete
- List of the busiest airports in Greece
- Transport in Greece
