= Corfu International Airport =

International airport serving the Greek island of Corfu

Corfu International Airport "Ioannis Kapodistrias" Κρατικός Αερολιμένας Κέρκυρας

- IATA: CFU; ICAO: LGKR

Summary
- Airport type: Public
- Owner: Greek Government
- Operator: Fraport Greece
- Serves: Corfu
- Location: Garitsa, Corfu
- Focus city for: Aegean Airlines; Ryanair
- Elevation AMSL: 6 ft (1.8 m)
- Coordinates: 39°36′07″N 19°54′42″E
- Website: cfu-airport.gr

Map
- Location in Greece

Runways
Direction	Length		Surface
Direction	ft	m	Surface
16/34	7,785	2,373	Asphalt

Statistics (2024)
- Passengers: 4,343,748
- Passenger traffic change: ▲6.8%
- Aircraft movements: 31,474
- Aircraft movements change: ▲7.0%
- Source: Greek AIP at HCAA; Statistics: Fraport Greece

Corfu International Airport "Ioannis Kapodistrias" (Greek: Κρατικός Αερολιμένας Κέρκυρας "Ιωάννης Καποδίστριας") or Ioannis Kapodistrias (Capodistrias) International Airport (IATA: CFU, ICAO: LGKR) is a government-owned airport on the Greek island of Corfu at Kerkyra, serving both scheduled and charter flights from European cities. Air traffic peaks during the summer season, between April and October.

The Ioannis Kapodistrias International Airport, named after Ioannis Kapodistrias, a distinguished Corfiot diplomat and the first governor of Greece, is located around 2 kilometres south of Corfu Town, and half a kilometre north of Pontikonisi.

== History ==
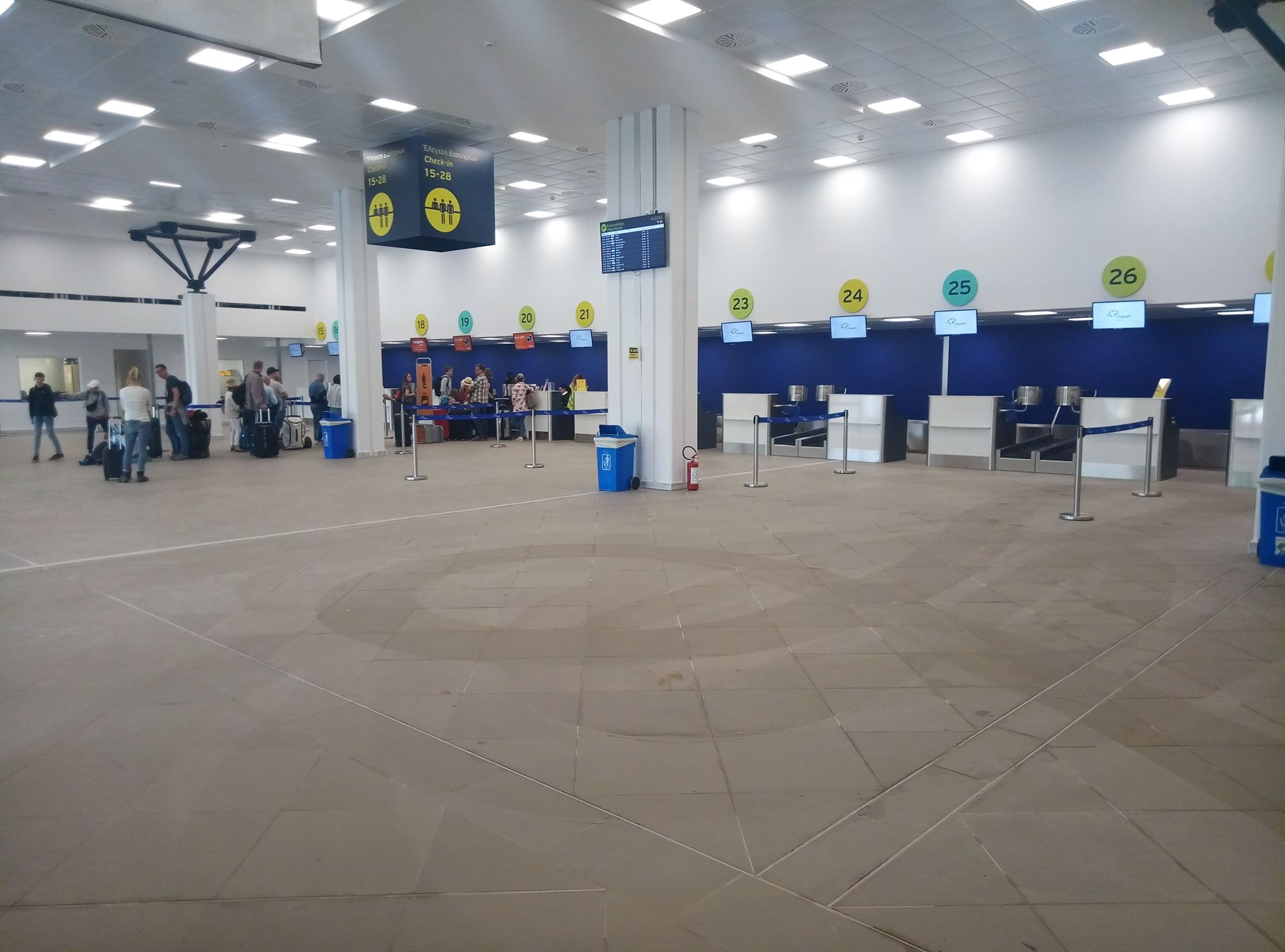
Check-in at Corfu Airport

The airport was founded in 1937. During the Second World War, it was used by German and Italian forces as a base for transport and fighter aircraft. During the war the runway length was 600 m. By the end of April 1949, the length had reached 800 m. A further extension to 1,260 m took place by the end of 1951 to meet the then larger aircraft needs. The next and last extension of the runway began in 1957 and was completed in 1959, with a length of 2,373m. The first commercial flight took place on 19 April 1949 from Athens operated by TAE Greek National Airlines. On 2 September 1950, HELLAS also started flights to Corfu. In 1962, a small passenger terminal was built, which today accommodates the Corfu Aeroclub. In April 1965, the airport became International, with the inaugural overseas flight being operated by Olympic Airlines. The construction of the new passenger terminal began in 1968 and was completed in 1972.

In December 2015, the privatisation of Corfu International Airport and 13 other regional airports of Greece was finalised with the signing of the agreement (as a joint venture) between Fraport AG/Copelouzos Group and state privatisation fund Hellenic Republic Asset Development Fund. "We signed the deal today," the head of Greece's privatisation agency HRADF, Stergios Pitsiorlas, told Reuters. According to the agreement, the joint venture will operate the 14 airports (including Corfu International Airport) for 40 years as of 11 April 2017.

== Fraport Greece's investment plan ==
On 22 March 2017, Fraport Greece presented its master plan for the 14 regional airports including Corfu International Airport.

Immediate actions that were implemented as soon as Fraport-Greece took over operations included a general clean-up of the airport, improving lighting and sanitary facilities and the markings of airside areas, as well as offering free WiFi and ensuring fire safety standards are met throughout the airport and surrounding property.

The master plan also included changes which will be implemented under Fraport-Greece's investment plan prior to 2021. These changes include the remodeling and expansion of the current terminal as well as the construction of a new terminal. A Hold Baggage inline Screening System (HBS) will improve safety and efficiency, along with the refurbishment of the airport fire service, which will benefit from the reorganization of the airport apron area including the replacement of paving in this area. Also planned is the increase in the number of check-in desks from 22 to 28, and the number of departure gates to 12, as well as reorganisation of the security check lanes in the terminal.

== Airlines and destinations ==
The following airlines operate regular scheduled and charter flights at Corfu Airport:

Airlines	Destinations
Aegean Airlines	Athens; Seasonal: Heraklion
Air France	Seasonal: Paris–Charles de Gaulle
Air Serbia	Seasonal: Belgrade
Arkia	Seasonal: Tel Aviv
Austrian Airlines	Seasonal: Vienna
Brussels Airlines	Seasonal: Brussels
Buzz	Seasonal charter: Katowice
Discover Airlines	Seasonal: Frankfurt, Munich,
easyJet	Seasonal: Basel/Mulhouse, Belfast–International, Bristol, Liverpool, Lyon, Naples, Newcastle upon Tyne, Paris–Charles de Gaulle
Edelweiss Air	Seasonal: Zurich
Eurowings	Seasonal: Berlin, Graz
ITA Airways	Seasonal: Rome–Fiumicino
Jet2.com	Seasonal: Bournemouth, Edinburgh, Glasgow, Liverpool, London–Gatwick, London–Luton
Luxair	Seasonal: Luxembourg
Neos	Seasonal: Milan–Malpensa, Tel Aviv, Verona
Norwegian Air Shuttle	Seasonal: Copenhagen, Oslo
Ryanair	Seasonal: Aarhus, Athens, Bergamo, Berlin, Birmingham, Bologna, Bratislava, Bucharest–Otopeni, Budapest, Charleroi, Cologne/Bonn, Dublin, East Midlands, Edinburgh, Gdańsk, Gothenburg, Hahn, Karlsruhe/Baden-Baden, Kraków, London–Stansted, Manchester, Marseille, Milan–Malpensa, Münster/Osnabrück, Naples, Pisa, Poznań, Prague, Shannon, Sofia, Stockholm–Arlanda, Teesside, Treviso, Turin, Verona, Vienna, Vilnius, Warsaw–Modlin, Weeze, Wrocław, Zagreb
Scandinavian Airlines	Seasonal: Copenhagen; Seasonal charter: Stockholm–Arlanda
Sky Express	Seasonal: Preveza, Kefalonia, Zakynthos
Smartwings	Seasonal: Brno, Ostrava, Prague,
Swiss International Air Lines	Seasonal: Geneva
Transavia	Seasonal: Nantes, Rotterdam/The Hague
TUI Airways	Seasonal: Aberdeen, Belfast–International, Bournemouth, Bristol, Cardiff, Exeter, Glasgow, Leeds/Bradford, London–Stansted, Newcastle upon Tyne, Norwich
TUI fly Deutschland	Seasonal: Düsseldorf, Frankfurt, Hannover, Munich, Stuttgart
TUI fly Netherlands	Seasonal: Amsterdam, Cork
Volotea	Seasonal: Bordeaux, Lille, Lyon, Nantes, Strasbourg
Wizz Air	Seasonal: Bucharest–Otopeni, Budapest, Cluj-Napoca, Katowice, London–Luton, Milan–Malpensa, Rome–Fiumicino, Sofia, Warsaw–Chopin

== Statistics ==
The data are from the official website of the airport.

Year	Passengers		
Year	Domestic	International	Total
2009	▼305,554	▼1,487,011	▼1,792,565
2010	▼282,362	▼1,462,399	▼1,744,761
2011	▼264,338	▲1,579,835	▲1,844,173
2012	▼231,215	▲1,683,307	▲1,914,522
2013	▼217,299	▲1,889,528	▲2,106,827
2014	▲236,995	▲2,146,383	▲2,383,378
2015	▲252,506	▲2,185,510	▲2,438,016
2016	▲298,810	▲2,465,749	▲2,764,559
2017	▼295,745	▲2,622,205	▲2,917,950
2018	▲340,318	▲3,023,797	▲3,364,115
2019	▲342,844	▼2,933,053	▼3,275,897
2020	▼140,471	▼820,566	▼961,037
2021	▲214,211	▲1,830,493	▲2,044,704
2022	▲345,115	▲3,403,991	▲3,749,106
2023	▲372,412	▲3,695,641	▲4,068,053
2024	▲400,216	▲3,943,532	▲4,343,748
2025(Nov)	▲415,478	▲4,175,760	▲4,591,238

=== Traffic statistics by country (2023) ===
Traffic by country at Corfu International Airport – 2023
Place	Country	Total passengers
1	United Kingdom	1,312,135
2	Germany	715,138
3	Greece	372,412
4	Italy	319,560
5	Poland	276,330
6	France	184,837
7	Czech Republic	122,943
8	Austria	87,714
9	Netherlands	84,022
10	Belgium	69,162
11	Hungary	64,283
12	Ireland	58,537
13	Romania	58,353
14	Israel	49,326
15	Slovakia	46,954

== Ground transport ==
By car or taxi, Corfu Airport is located 2.7 km (1.7 mi) from the city of Corfu and takes about 10 minutes. Bus services are provided between the airport and the city centre.

== See also ==
- Transport in Greece
