= Massacre of Kos =

World War II war crime

Coordinates: 36.7909°N 27.0712°E

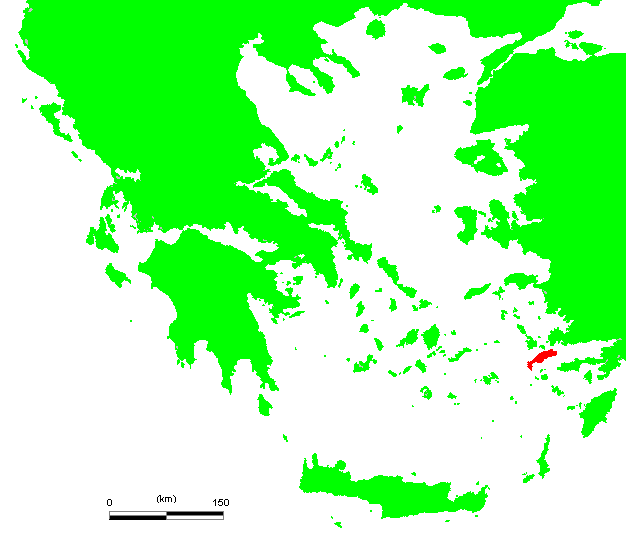
Location of Kos in the Aegean Sea

The Massacre of Kos (Italian: Eccidio di Kos) was a war crime perpetrated in early October 1943 by the Wehrmacht against Italian army POWs on the Dodecanese island of Kos, then under Italian occupation. About a hundred Italian officers were shot on the commands of General Friedrich-Wilhelm Müller, after being considered traitors for resisting the German invasion of the island (known as the Battle of Kos, part of the Dodecanese campaign).

== Background ==
Kos was occupied by Italy since the Italo-Turkish War of 1912, which ended the long Ottoman rule over the island. In the course of the Second World War, Kos became important because of an airfield near Antimachia. The armistice of Cassibile on 8 September 1943, which stipulated the surrender of Italy to the Allies, was greeted with enthusiasm both by the Italian army and the local population in the hope of an imminent conclusion of the war. The few Germans on the island were caught off guard and easily disarmed. Soon after, more than 1,500 British troops landed on Kos to assist the approximately 4,000 Italian soldiers in defending the island from a possible German invasion.

In the dawn of 3 October, the German 22nd Air Landing Division (then stationed on Crete), led by General Friedrich-Wilhelm Müller, began Operation Polar Bear by landing in three different locations on the island, both from the sea and the air. During the battle there was no coordination between the Italians and the British, the RAF was unable to provide air cover, and the lack of sufficient anti-aircraft artillery allowed the Luftwaffe's Fliegerkorps X to carry out heavy air bombardments undisturbed. Thus, even though the ground forces defending Kos vastly outnumbered the Germans (about 5,500 British and Italians vs. approximately 1,000 Germans), they surrendered on October 4. A total of 1,388 British and 3,145 Italians were captured and mustered in Neratzia Castle in the city of Kos.

== The massacre ==
Between 4 and 6 October, 148 captured Italian officers (who belonged to the 10th Regiment, 50th Infantry Division Regina, commanded by Colonel Felice Leggio) underwent a summary trial ordered by Müller. It was concluded that all the officers who had remained loyal to King Vittorio Emanuele III and had resisted the Germans as a result, were to be shot. Eventually, of the 148 officers, seven switched sides joining the Germans, 28 managed to escape to Turkey, 10 were hospitalized and later transferred to camps in Germany, whereas the remaining 103 were shot by Müller's men between the evening of October 4 and 7 near the Tigaki salt lake (Alyki).

== Aftermath ==
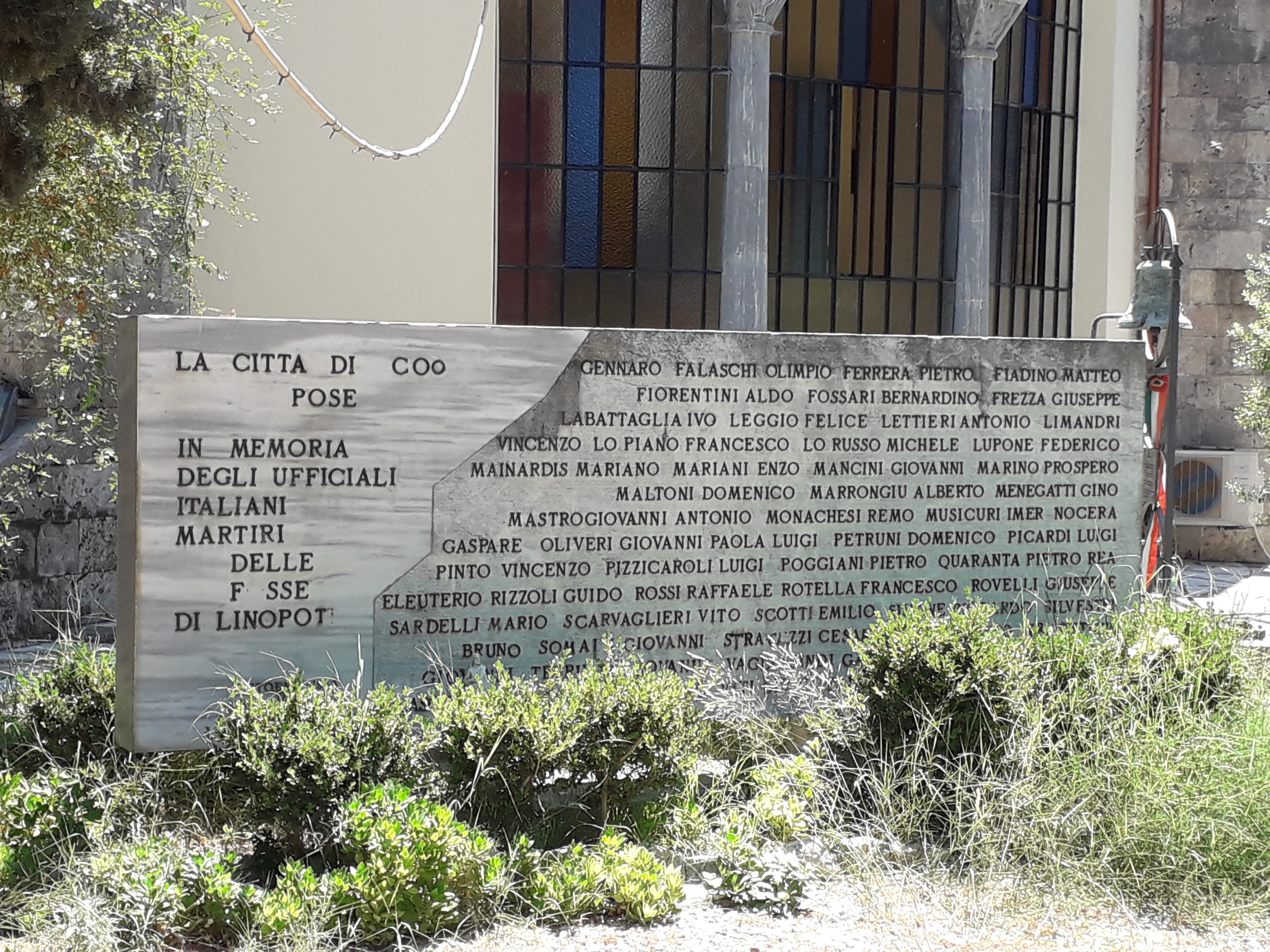
Kos Massacre memorial in front of the Agnus Dei Church

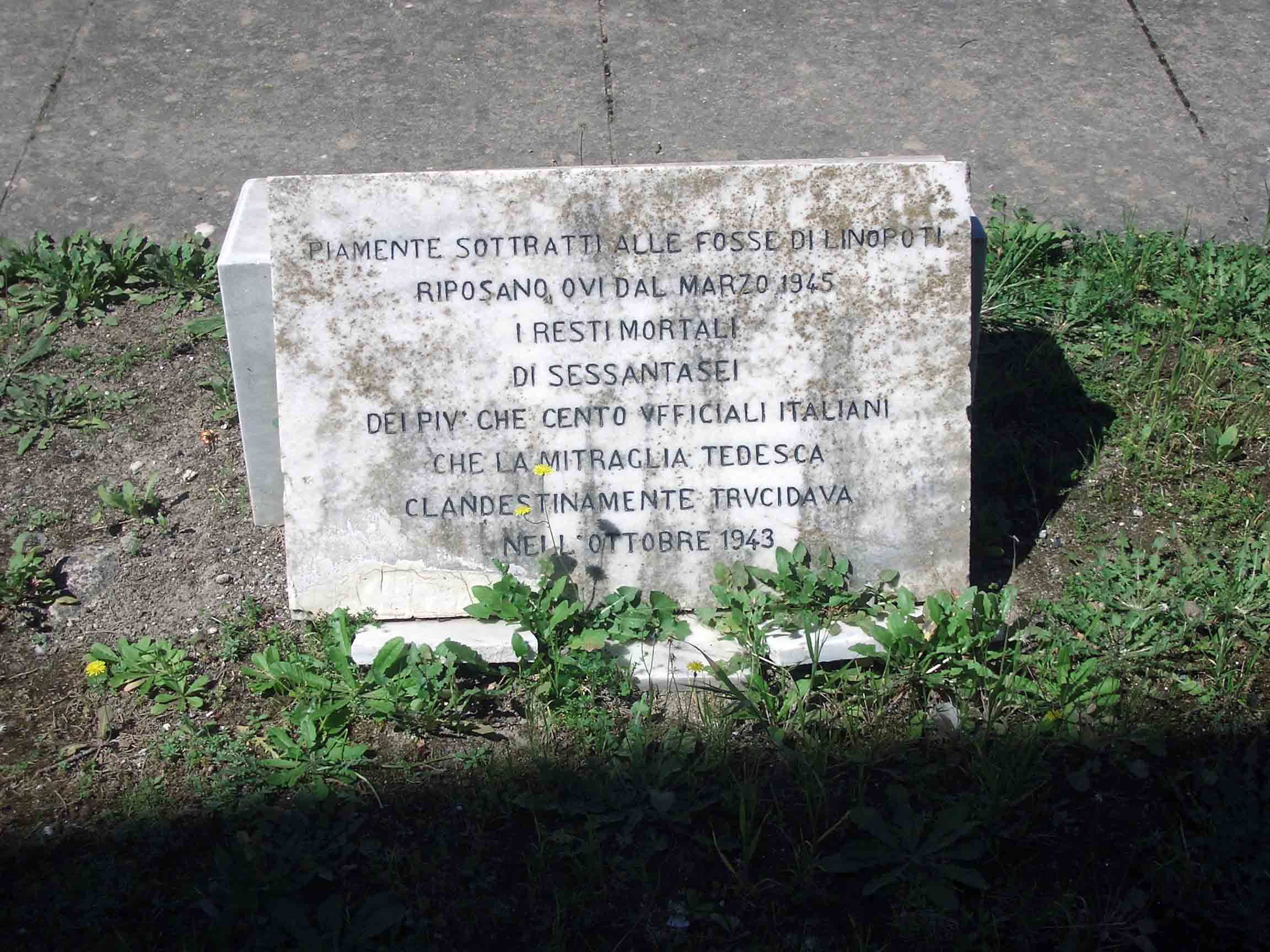
Commemorative plaque in the Kos cemetery

In February 1945, 66 bodies were exhumed from eight mass graves near Linopotis and buried in the Catholic cemetery of Kos. In 1954, these bodies were transported to Italy and buried in a WW II memorial in Bari. Despite the fact that many bodies were still missing in Kos, no research campaign to locate them was undertaken until 2015. Then, a group of Greek and Italian volunteers carried out excavations which unearthed human remains and personal objects. The recovered remains were placed in a marble urn at the ossuary of the Catholic cemetery of Kos.

After the end of the war General Müller was captured in East Prussia by the Red Army and extradited to Greece, where he was sentenced to death by a military court for retaliatory atrocities against civilians in Crete (but not for the events on Kos). He was executed by firing squad in Athens on 20 May 1947 and was the only one punished among those responsible for the massacre.

=== The armoire of shame ===
In 1994, during the trial of former SS Erich Priebke, documents related to the Kos massacre were uncovered among many other files in an archive found in a wooden cabinet facing a wall (the armoire of shame) in the chancellery of the military attorney's office in Rome. In 2003, inquiries by a parliamentary commission revealed that in January 1960, the Italian military attorney general Gen. Enrico Santacroce had signed a filing order for almost 2,000 Nazi war crime files. In the context of the Cold War era, the military attorney general was under strong political pressure to cover up the material by ministers G. Martino and P. Taviani who feared that Germany, Italy's NATO ally, would be offended.

== See also ==
- Massacre of the Acqui Division
- SS Oria
