= Kamari Bay =

Bay on Kos Island, Greece

Coordinates: 36.74°N 26.98°E

Kamari Bay is situated at the southwestern end of the Greek island of Kos. It is a popular tourist destination. The bay is overlooked by the ancient cliff-top village of Kefalos (Greek: Κέφαλος) and is often referred to as Kefalos Bay or Kefalos Beach. The village of Kefalos (sometimes spelled Kephalos) was once the island's capital, but after a devastating earthquake around 400 BC, a new capital was established at the town of Kos, on the other end of the island.

== Architecture ==
Kos, amongst other islands in the area, was part of the Kingdom of Italy from 1912 to 1943. Many buildings in the town of Kos date from this era. This Italian influence is rarely visible at the other end of the island in the Kefalos and Kamari Bay area, which is a comparatively recent development.

== Geography ==
At the western end of the bay is a deep-water harbor, which is overlooked by steep cliffs of a volcanic rhyolitic dome, called Mount Zini. The mountain is a geologically recent structure formed in the Quaternary Period. It is separated from the harbour by a sandy beach. From the harbour, a steep road leads up to the west end of the village of Kefalos.

A promenade extends from the harbour eastwards down to the sea. There the road turns briefly northwards before turning back and following the direction of the coast and on towards Kos, about 40 kilometers away. This road, in the opposite direction, leads up the steep climb to the east end of Kefalos.

A small church of Agios Nikolaos is located on the small volcanic island of Kastri. The ruins of the Roman Christian church of Agios Stefanos also still stand, featuring mosaic floors inside the remnants of its walls and columns. The sandy beach and bay continue towards cliffs of volcanic ignimbrite, formed in the Miocene Period over ten million years ago. This tough rock shows evidence of Greek (Hellenic) quarrying activity for obtaining building stone.

Towards Mount Zini, beyond the harbour, lies the Pliocene Period peak of Mount Latra (426 meters). The volcanic island of Nisyros is located south of the bay, with Pergoussa and Pachia to its west and Gyali (or Yiali) and Strongyli in between.

== Tourism ==
During the tourist season, Kamari Bay is a busy resort, but it is sparsely populated during the off-season, when locals retreat to Kefalos. The Kamari Bay area is popular with British tourists. Most locals speak fluent English, and the bay is home to an expatriate population. Kamari Bay is also a popular tourist destination for Dutch, Italian, German, and Russian tourists. It is considered to be a quieter Kos resort, in comparison to other tourist destinations such as Kardamena and the environs of Kos Town.

Local restaurants offer European food, Italian cuisine, Indian and Chinese meals, in addition to traditional Greek tavernas. The area features several music venues and occasional live music. Local island produce includes bakery products, meats, honey, fruit, and vegetables.

Boat trips operate from the harbour to the island of Nisyros. Angling is popular, especially in the deepwater of the harbour area. Local fishing boats also operate in the harbour and sell their produce to local restaurants.

== Transportation ==
The bay area is served by a bus service to Kefalos via the harbour, and towards Kos via the main road using the eastern road. Buses run from here to Kos Town via Paradise Beach, the airport and Antimachia, Mastichari, and Zipari. Several rental companies operate in the bay area, which provide cars, motorbikes, scooters, quad-bikes, and bicycles.

== Religion ==
Religion is observed by locals, particularly amongst the older generations. Churches, even if not regularly used, are often meticulously maintained. On Sundays, some businesses are closed or have restricted opening hours, particularly in the village of Kefalos.
