= Kos International Airport =

Airport in Greece

Kos International Airport "Ippokratis"

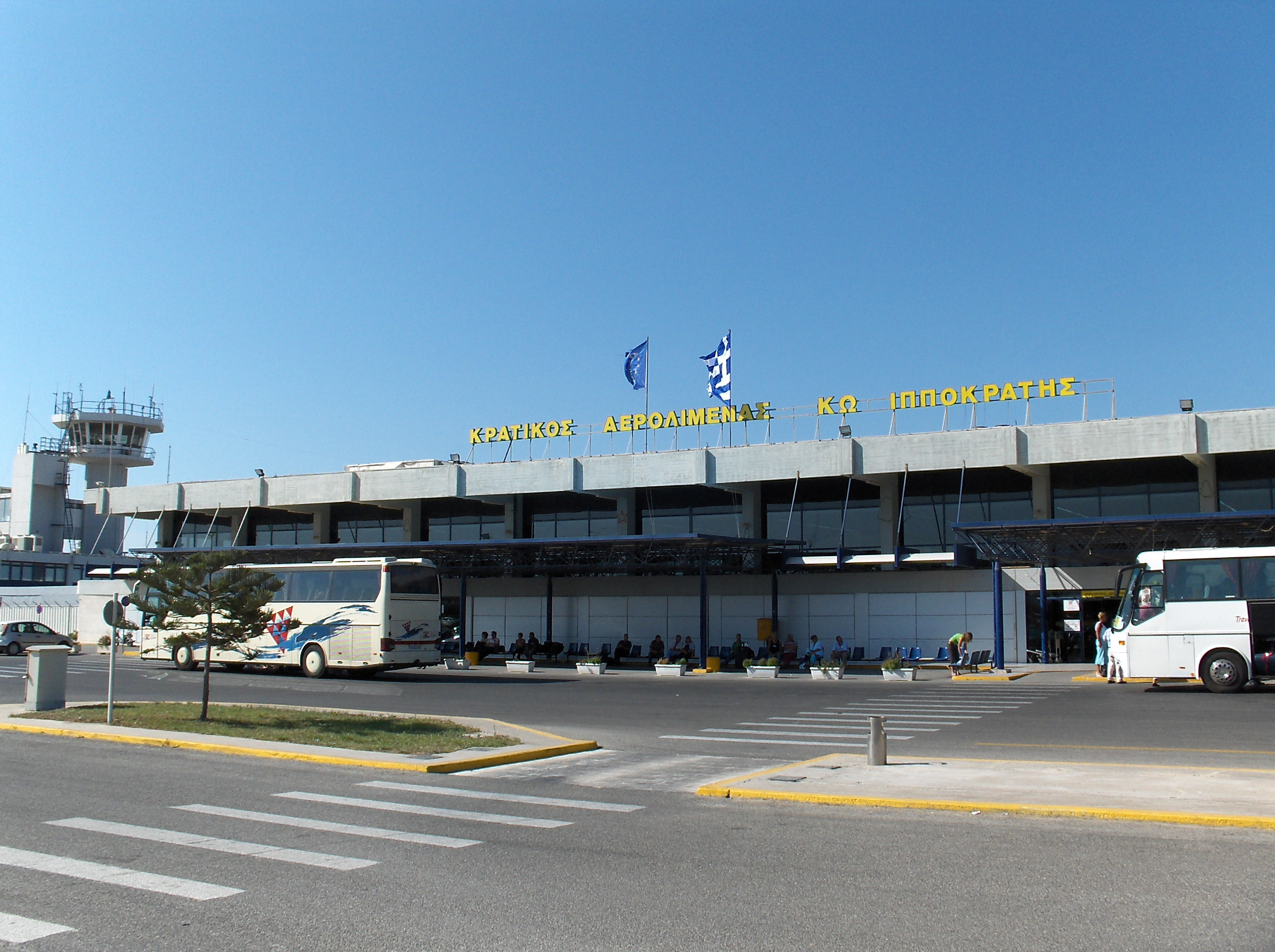
- IATA: KGS; ICAO: LGKO; WMO: 16742

Summary
- Airport type: Public
- Owner: Greek state
- Operator: Fraport Greece
- Serves: Kos Island
- Location: Antimachia, Greece
- Focus city for: Aegean Airlines
- Elevation AMSL: 409 ft (125 m)
- Coordinates: 36°47′36.01″N 27°05′30″E
- Website: kgs-airport.gr

Map
- Location of airport in Greece

Runways
Direction	Length		Surface
Direction	ft	m	Surface
14/32	7,874	2,400	Asphalt

Statistics (2024)
- Passengers: 3,069,569
- Passenger traffic change: ▲3.9%
- Aircraft movements: 22,877
- Aircraft movements change: ▲4.5
- Statistics

Kos International Airport "Ippokratis" (Greek: Διεθνής Αερολιμένας Κω "Ιπποκρατης"; named for Hippocrates) (IATA: KGS, ICAO: LGKO) is an international airport on the island of Kos in Greece. It is located near Antimachia Village, and is operated by Fraport AG.

The airport mainly serves charter airlines, who bring customers on holiday to the island. Kos Airport hits its peak in summer, with flights from German and British airlines primarily.

== History ==
The airport was opened on 4 April 1964. In 1974, the runway was extended to 2,400 metres. Due to increased traffic at the airport, a new terminal was built in 1980. In 1997, the terminal building was renovated and expanded.

In December 2015, the privatisation of Kos Island International Airport and 13 other regional airports of Greece was finalised with the signing of the agreement between the Fraport AG/Copelouzos Group joint venture and the state privatisation fund. "We signed the deal today," the head of Greece's privatisation agency HRADF, Stergios Pitsiorlas, told Reuters. According to the agreement, the joint venture will operate the 14 airports (including Kos Island International Airport) for 40 years as of 11 April 2017.

On 22 March 2017, Fraport AG and its Greek subsidiary Fraport Greece presented its plans for 14 regional airports that they had been handed control of by the Greek Government. The immediate actions by Fraport were to improve lighting, improve the marking of airside areas, upgrade sanitary facilities, enhance WiFi services and implementing better fire safety throughout the airport.

The long-term plans by the operator, which initially were to continue until 2021, included the building of a new terminal and a new fire station, and the refurbishment of the waste water treatment plant. The new terminal provides significantly more check-in desks and security check lanes.

== Airlines and destinations ==
The following airlines operate regular scheduled and charter flights at Kos Airport:

Airlines	Destinations
Aegean Airlines	Athens, Thessaloniki; Seasonal: Heraklion
ASL Airlines France	Seasonal: Lille
Austrian Airlines	Seasonal: Vienna
BlueBird Airways	Seasonal: Tel Aviv
British Airways	Seasonal: London–Gatwick
Brussels Airlines	Seasonal: Brussels
Chair Airlines	Seasonal: Zurich
Condor	Seasonal: Berlin, Düsseldorf, Frankfurt, Hamburg, Munich, Stuttgart, Vienna, Zurich
Corendon Airlines	Seasonal: Brussels, Düsseldorf, Hannover, Nuremberg
Corendon Dutch Airlines	Seasonal: Amsterdam, Brussels
Discover Airlines	Seasonal: Frankfurt, Munich
easyJet	Seasonal: Berlin, Birmingham, Bristol, Glasgow, Liverpool, London–Gatwick, Manchester, Milan–Malpensa, Naples, Venice
Edelweiss Air	Seasonal: Zurich
Enter Air	Seasonal charter: Basel, Gdańsk, Karlsruhe Baden-Baden, Katowice
Eurowings	Seasonal: Berlin, Cologne/Bonn, Düsseldorf, Graz, Hamburg, Innsbruck, Linz, Nuremberg, Salzburg, Stuttgart
Finnair	Seasonal: Helsinki
Freebird	Seasonal: Cologne, Leipzig, Paderborn
Helvetic Airways	Seasonal: Bern
Jet2.com	Seasonal: Birmingham, Bournemouth, Bristol, East Midlands, Edinburgh, Glasgow, Leeds/Bradford, Liverpool, London–Gatwick, London–Luton, London–Stansted, Manchester, Newcastle upon Tyne
Jettime	Copenhagen
LEAV Aviation	Seasonal: Cologne/Bonn
LOT	Warsaw, Wroclaw
Luxair	Seasonal: Luxembourg
Marabu	Leipzig, Nuremberg
Neos	Seasonal: Bologna, Milan-Bergamo, Milan–Malpensa, Verona
Ryanair	Seasonal: Bari, Berlin, Bologna, Dublin, London–Stansted, Milan-Bergamo, Milan–Malpensa, Pisa, Rome–Fiumicino, Treviso, Vienna, Weeze, Zagreb
SAS	Copenhagen
Sky Express	Astypalaia, Athens, Kalymnos, Leros, Rhodes
Smartwings	Seasonal: Bratislava, Brno, Ostrava, Prague
Sunclass Airlines	Seasonal: Gothenburg, Helsinki
Sundair	Dresden
Swiss International Air Lines	Seasonal: Geneva
Transavia	Seasonal: Amsterdam, Eindhoven, Paris–Orly, Rotterdam/The Hague
TUI Airways	Seasonal: Belfast–International, Birmingham, Bournemouth, Bristol, Cardiff, East Midlands, Exeter, London–Gatwick, London–Stansted, Manchester, Newcastle upon Tyne
TUI fly Belgium	Seasonal: Brussels
TUI fly Deutschland	Seasonal: Düsseldorf, Frankfurt, Hannover, Munich, Stuttgart
TUI fly Netherlands	Seasonal: Amsterdam, Eindhoven, Groningen, Rotterdam/The Hague
TUS Airways	Seasonal: Tel Aviv

== Statistics ==
The data are from Hellenic Civil Aviation Authority (CAA) until 2016 and from 2017 onwards from the official website of the airport.

Year	Passengers		
Year	Domestic	International	Total
1994	125,215	1,130,052	1,255,267
1995	▼141,283	▼1,015,148	▼1,156,431
1996	▲150,271	▼892,154	▼1,042,425
1997	▲153,151	▲1,006,424	▲1,159,575
1998	▼145,312	▲1,044,604	▲1,189,916
1999	▲169,650	▲1,274,656	▲1,444,306
2000	▲217,876	▲1,360,280	▲1,578,156
2001	▼200,614	▲1,440,986	▲1,641,600
2002	▼177,003	▼1,321,099	▼1,498,102
2003	▲183,821	▼1,278,862	▼1,462,683
2004	▲247,758	▼1,256,941	▲1,504,699
2005	▲255,077	▼1,207,698	▼1,462,775
2006	▼251,610	▲1,321,507	▲1,573,117
2007	▲272,271	▲1,369,410	▲1,641,681
2008	▼264,276	▼1,351,177	▼1,615,453
2009	▼260,347	▼1,257,599	▼1,517,946
2010	▼231,057	▲1,396,183	▲1,627,240
2011	▼220,921	▲1,705,302	▲1,926,223
2012	▼192,043	▼1,605,458	▼1,797,501
2013	▼175,422	▲1,853,196	▲2,028,618
2014	▲189,750	▲2,024,714	▲2,214,464
2015	▲201,000	▼1,942,860	▼2,143,860
2016	▲205,695	▼1,695,800	▼1,901,495
2017	▲234,023	▲2,086,567	▲2,320,590
2018	▲271,725	▲2,394,582	▲2,666,307
2019	▲284,948	▼2,391,696	▲2,676,644
2020	▼134,392	▼666,263	▼800,655
2021	▲174,028	▲1,400,490	▲1,574,518
2022	▲263,900	▲2,527,690	▲2,791,590
2023	▲305,775	▲2,648,944	▲2,954,719
2024	▲326,182	▲2,743,477	▲3,069,659
2025	▲349,422	▲2,826,641	▲3,176,063

=== Traffic statistics by country (2024) ===
Traffic by country at Kos International Airport – 2024
Rank	Country	Total passengers
1	United Kingdom	768,252
2	Germany	712,243
3	Greece	326,182
4	Poland	225,477
5	Netherlands	225,048
6	Italy	163,766
7	Belgium	102,682
8	Switzerland	99,531
9	Czech Republic	90,737
10	Austria	88,092
11	France	47,808
12	Sweden	44,941
13	Denmark	32,503
14	Ireland	30,877
15	Israel	28,890

== Ground transport ==
By public bus: A transit bus service operates between the airport and Kos town, Mastichari, Kardamena and Kefalos.

By tour operator transfer: Tour operators such as Jet2holidays and TUI UK provide free bus transfers from customers' accommodation to the airport.

By taxi: 24/7 metered taxi service is available outside the Kos Airport Terminal building.

By car: Kos Airport is located 24 km from the Kos town and is accessible from the provincial road Kos-Kefalos.

== Accidents and incidents ==
- In 2013, an Air Explore Boeing 737 made an emergency landing due to the left engine overheating. Once it taxied to the gate, the engine caught fire. The pilot ordered an evacuation using the emergency slides on either side of the aircraft. No one was injured during the incident.

== See also ==
- Transport in Greece
