= Dikaios, Kos =

Dikaios Δίκαιος
- Municipal unit
- Location within Kos

- Location within Greece
- Coordinates: 36°52′N 27°12′E
- Country: Greece
- Administrative region: South Aegean
- Regional unit: Kos
- Municipality: Kos

Area
  - Municipal unit: 62.6 km^{2} (24.2 sq mi)

Population (2021)
  - Municipal unit: 8,192
  - Municipal unit density: 131/km^{2} (339/sq mi)
- Time zone: UTC+2 (EET)
  - Summer (DST): UTC+3 (EEST)

Dikaios (Greek: Δίκαιος) is a former municipality on the island of Kos, in the Dodecanese, Greece. Since the 2011 local government reform, it is part of the municipality Kos, of which it is a municipal unit. Population 8,192 (2021). The seat of the municipality was in Zipari. The other large town is Pyli. The municipal unit, which comprises about one-fifth of the island's territory, has a land area of 62.575 km². It shares the island of Kos with the municipal units of Kos and Irakleides.
