= Aegelus =

Aegelus or Aigelos (Ancient Greek: Αἴγηλος) was an ancient deme on the island of Cos. Its capital was Antimachia.
