= Archia (Cos) =

Archia (Ancient Greek: Ἀρχιά) was an ancient deme on the island of Cos. Its capital was Antimachia.
