= Tigaki =

- Elevation: 15 m (49 ft)

Tigaki (Greek: Τιγκάκι) is a village located on the Greek island of Kos, situated by the sea.

== Geography ==
Tigaki is located approximately 10 kilometers west of Kos Town. It is about 1.5 kilometers from the main connecting road between Kos and Kefalos. The Kos Airport in Andimachia is about twelve kilometers away by air. In the south, the nearest villages are Marmari, Zipari, and Linopotis, while in the southwest lies Pyli, and to the west is Mastichari. Tigaki is approximately 150 meters from the village center to the sea, and about 400 meters to the Alykes saltwater lake. To the north, about 3.5 kilometers away, are the islands of Pserimos and the uninhabited island of Platy.

== Transport ==
Tigaki is connected to Kos and Kefalos, as well as the villages in between, by bus routes.

== Administration ==
Tigaki is part of the municipal unit of Dikeos. The municipal unit of Dikeos is divided into two municipal districts (Asfendio and Pyli) with eight villages.

== Population ==
Dikeos was home to 7,130 people as of 2011. Within the municipal district of Asfendio (Δημοτική Κοινότητα Ασφενδιού), 4,094 people lived in 2011, with 363 residing in Tigaki.

== Economy ==
Tigaki transformed from an agriculturally-oriented village and fishing port into a holiday resort.

== Points of Interest ==
Alykes Salt Lake is easily accessible by vehicle, and some structures from the former salt production site are preserved. Tigaki Beach and Lambi Beach are popular sandy beaches.

== Literature ==
- Varelas, Nikos (2006). Kos. Den Haag: ANWB. ISBN 978-3-7701-5759-4.
