= Mastichari =

Mastichari Μαστιχάρι
- Settlement
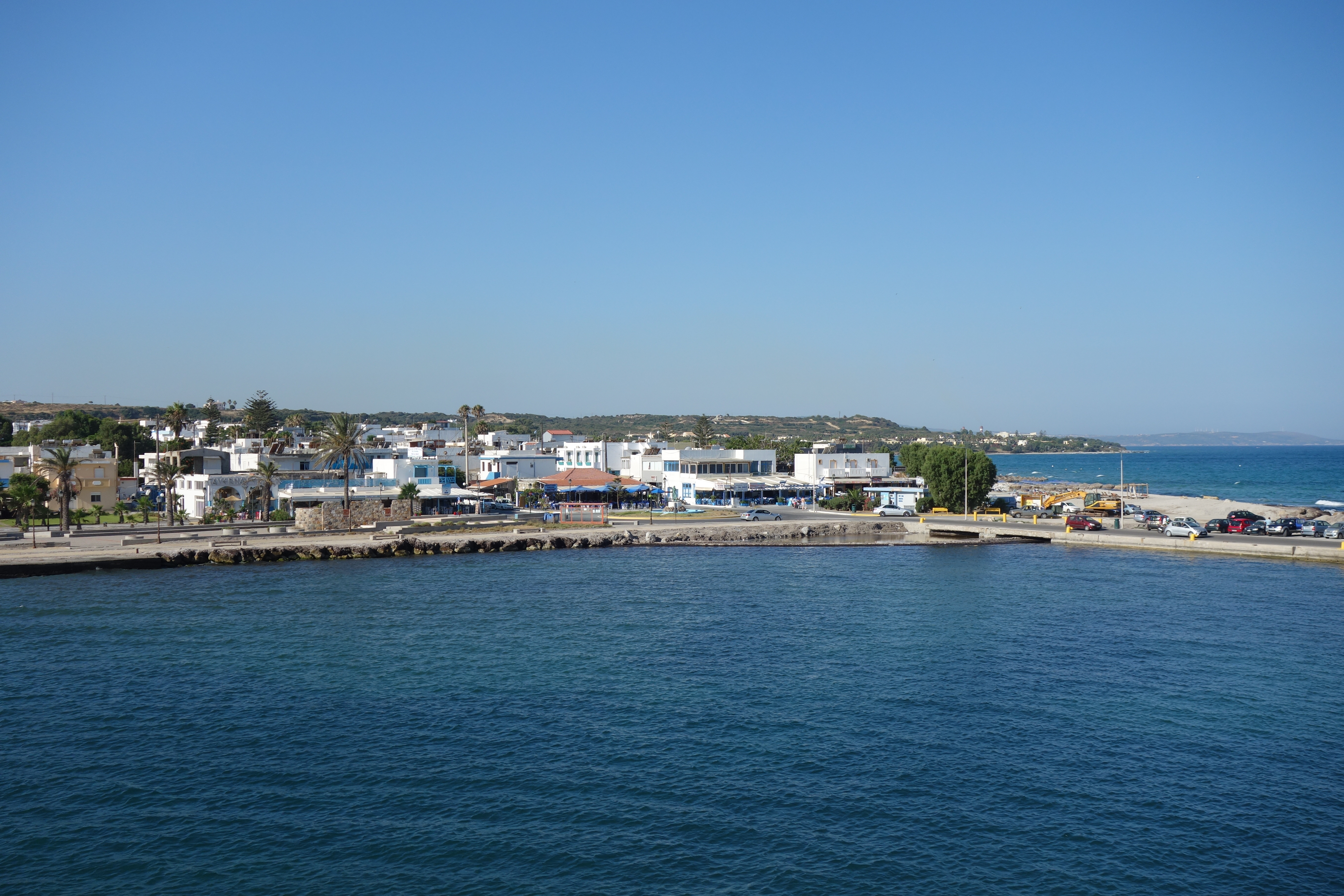

- Location within Greece
- Coordinates: 36°50′57″N 27°04′35″E
- Country: Greece
- Administrative region: South Aegean
- Regional unit: Kos
- Municipality: Kos
- Municipal unit: Irakleides
- Community: Antimacheia

Population (2021)
  - Total: 479
- Time zone: UTC+2 (EET)
  - Summer (DST): UTC+3 (EEST)

Mastichari (Greek: Μαστιχάρι) is a fishing village and tourist resort on the island of Kos in Greece with a population of 479 (2021), situated 7 kilometers away from Kos International Airport. The town has a port with boats regularly departing to the island of Kalymnos. Mastihari has only been inhabited since 1933, when an earthquake struck a nearby village and the inhabitants had to migrate.

== Gallery ==
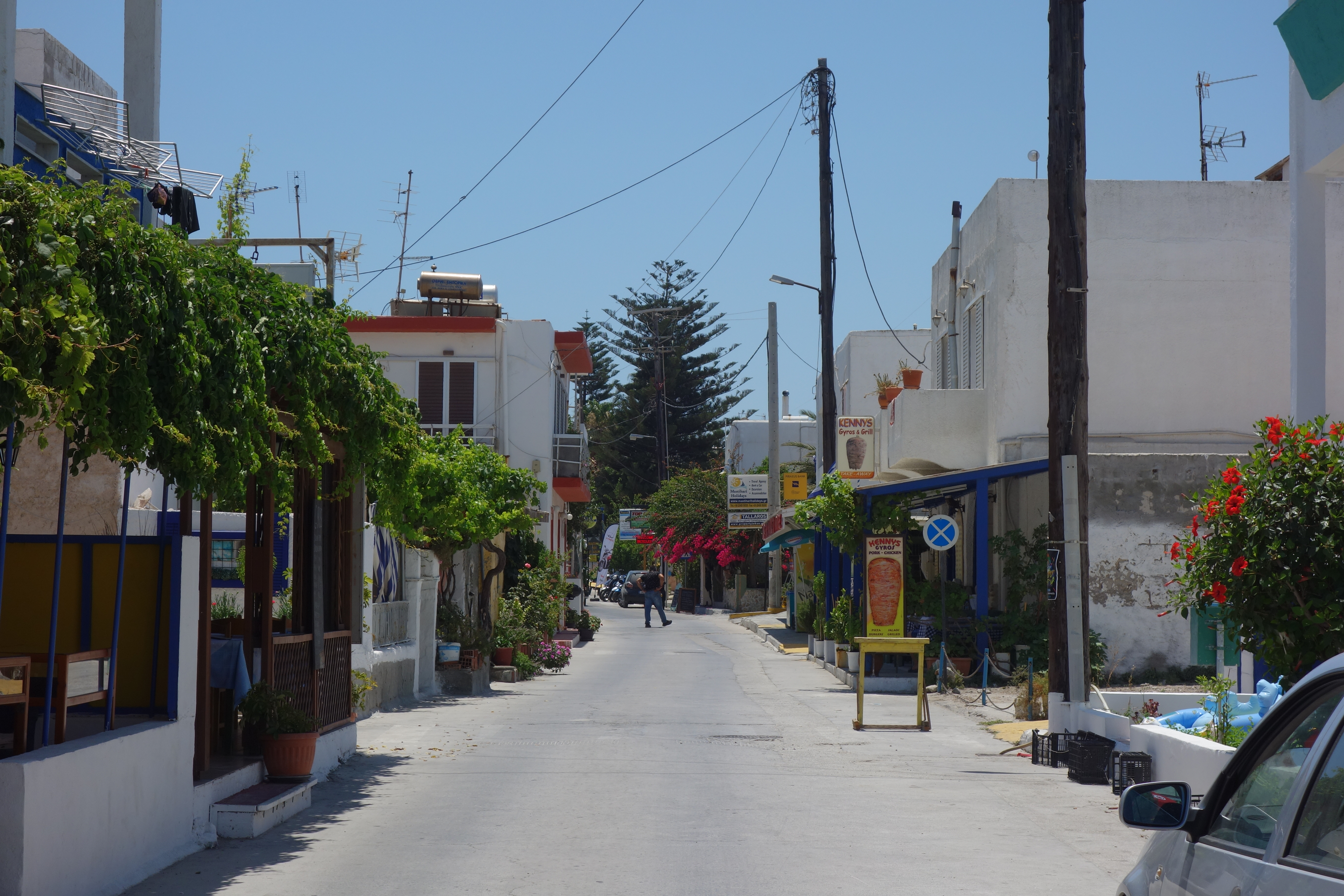
A street in Mastichari

Street in Mastichari showing shops

Mastichari restaurants near port
