= Irakleides =

Irakleides Ηρακλείδες
- Municipal unit
- Location within the Dodecanese

- Location within Greece
- Coordinates: 36°49′N 27°06′E
- Country: Greece
- Administrative region: South Aegean
- Regional unit: Kos
- Municipality: Kos

Area
  - Municipal unit: 160.5 km^{2} (62.0 sq mi)

Population (2021)
  - Municipal unit: 7,467
  - Municipal unit density: 46.52/km^{2} (120.5/sq mi)
- Time zone: UTC+2 (EET)
  - Summer (DST): UTC+3 (EEST)

Irakleides (Greek: Ηρακλείδες) is a former municipality on the island of Kos, in the Dodecanese, Greece. Since the 2011 local government reform, it is part of the municipality Kos, of which it is a municipal unit. Population 7,467 (2021). It is the largest in area of the three municipal units on the island, at 160.538 km², and comprises 55.3% of the island's territory. The seat of the municipality was in Antimacheia. The largest village is Kefalos. Kardamaina, Mastichari, Kampos, Onia, and Kamarion are the other villages in the municipal unit. It shares the island of Kos with the municipal units of Kos and Dikaios.
