= Kefalos =

Kefalos Κέφαλος
- Community
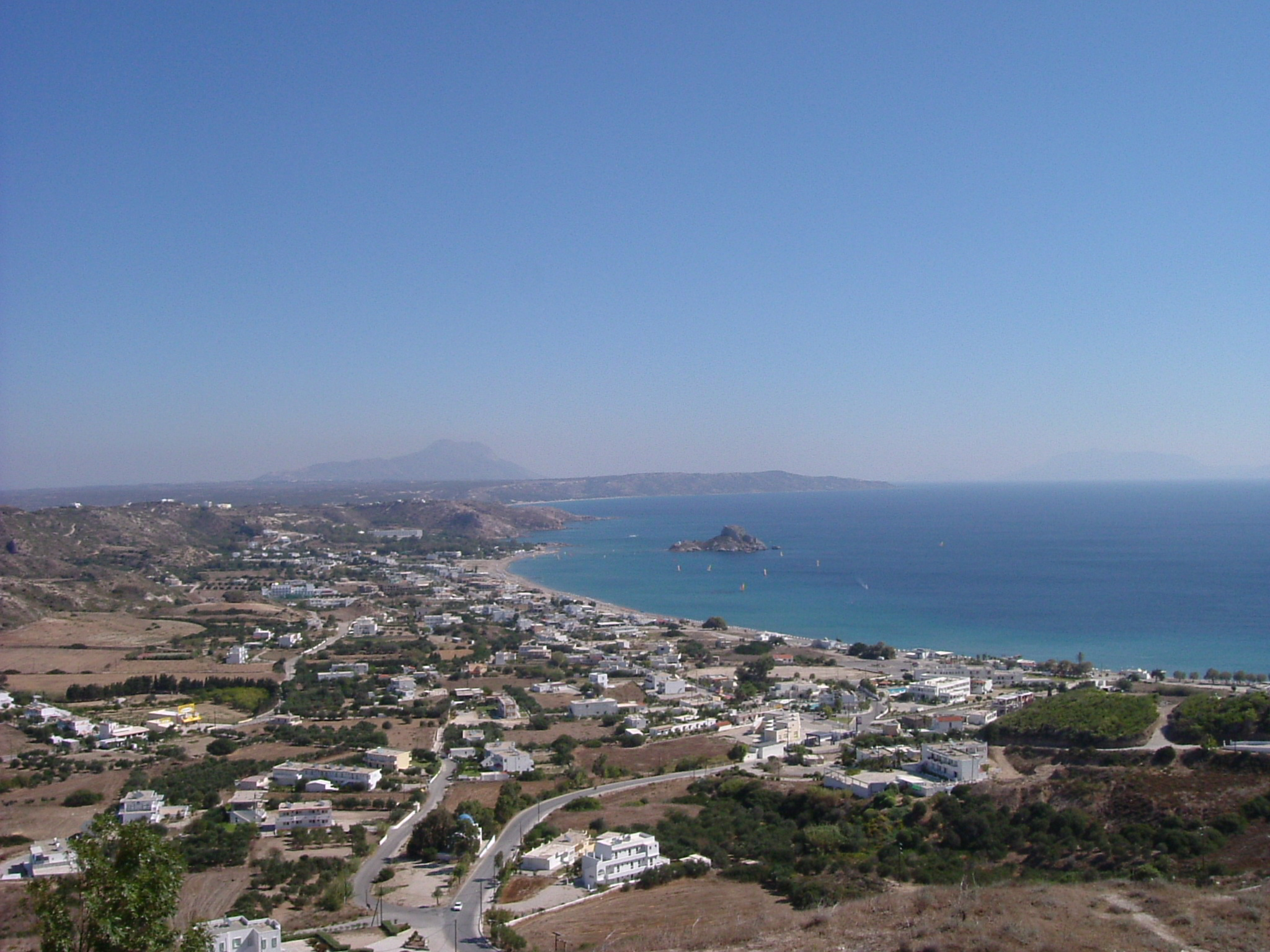

- Location within Greece
- Coordinates: 36°44′42″N 26°57′36″E
- Country: Greece
- Administrative region: South Aegean
- Regional unit: Kos
- Municipality: Kos
- Municipal unit: Irakleides

Population (2021)
  - Community: 2,713
- Time zone: UTC+2 (EET)
  - Summer (DST): UTC+3 (EEST)

Kefalos (Greek: Κέφαλος) is the westernmost town on the Greek island of Kos, 43 km from Kos Town. It is situated on a peninsula, also known as Kefalos, at the south-west side of the island. The town is built on a stone height, dominated by the imposing windmill of Papavasilis and is home to 2,329 inhabitants (2021 census).

== Neighbouring settlements, administration and facilities ==
Beneath the old town of Kefalos is the Bay of Kamari, where the beach resorts of Kamari, Kampos and Onia follow the curve of the bay for approximately 2 kilometres. The name Kefalos is often used for this area as well.

Kefalos town and these smaller beach settlements form together a local community (δημοτική κοινότητα), also called Kefalos (population 2021: 2,713), which is part of the municipal unit of Irakleides and of the Kos municipality.

There are several facilities for visitors (taverns, bars, music, boat trips), but shops are limited; for other than daily purchases, people can go to either the neighbouring Kardamaina or to Kos Town on the other end of the island.

== Attractions ==
- Ruins of the medieval castle of Kefalos dating back to the thirteenth century
- The ancient site of Palatia
- Ruins of the early Christian Basilica of Ayios Stefanos at Kamari
- The cave at Aspri Petra
- Monastery of Ayios Ioannis (Thimianos)
- Mikro Limanaki beach at the north of Kefalos peninsula.
- Isódia Tis Panagías church
