= Kardamaina =

Kardamaina Καρδάμαινα
- Community
- Main Square

- Location within Greece
- Coordinates: 36°47′N 27°09′E
- Country: Greece
- Administrative region: South Aegean
- Regional unit: Kos
- Municipality: Kos
- Municipal unit: Irakleides

Population (2021)
  - Community: 2,132
- Time zone: UTC+2 (EET)
  - Summer (DST): UTC+3 (EEST)

Kardámaina or Kardámena (Greek: Καρδάμαινα), is a small Greek town 7 km from Kos Island International Airport at Antimacheia, situated mid-way along the south coast of the island of Kos. It lies in the municipal unit of Irakleides, in the Dodecanese. Once a small fishing village, it has been a popular summer destination since the 1960s, offering pubs, restaurants, bars, night clubs and watersports facilities. According to the 2021 census, there were 2,132 inhabitants. Its land area is 35.150 km^{2}. Between June and September, the town population triples due to the influx of tourists.

== History ==
Kardamaina is built on the site of the ancient settlement of Alasarna. During the 2nd century BC, Alasarna was an important urban center with a thousand citizens (excluding slaves).

Archaeological excavations have brought to light some impressive ruins, such as a temple of Apollo, an extensive Early Christian settlement, and four basilicas that belong to the same period. Stone objects of everyday use (millstones, tools, vases, vessels), mostly made of volcanic and sedimentary rocks, have been recovered.

== Gallery ==
Panoramic Main Square

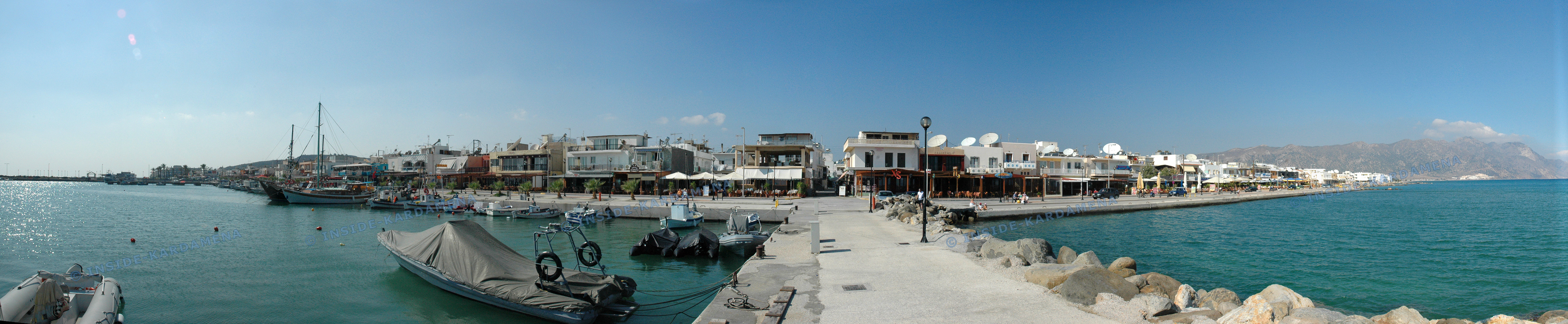
Panoramic Harbour Front
