= Antimachia =

Coordinates: 36°48′11″N 27°07′39″E

Antimachia (Ancient Greek: Ἀντιμαχία) was a town of ancient Greece on the island of Cos. Antimachia was the capital of the demoi of Aegelus and Archia.

Its site is located near modern Antimakheia.
