= Kos =

Island in Greece

Kos Κως
- Municipality
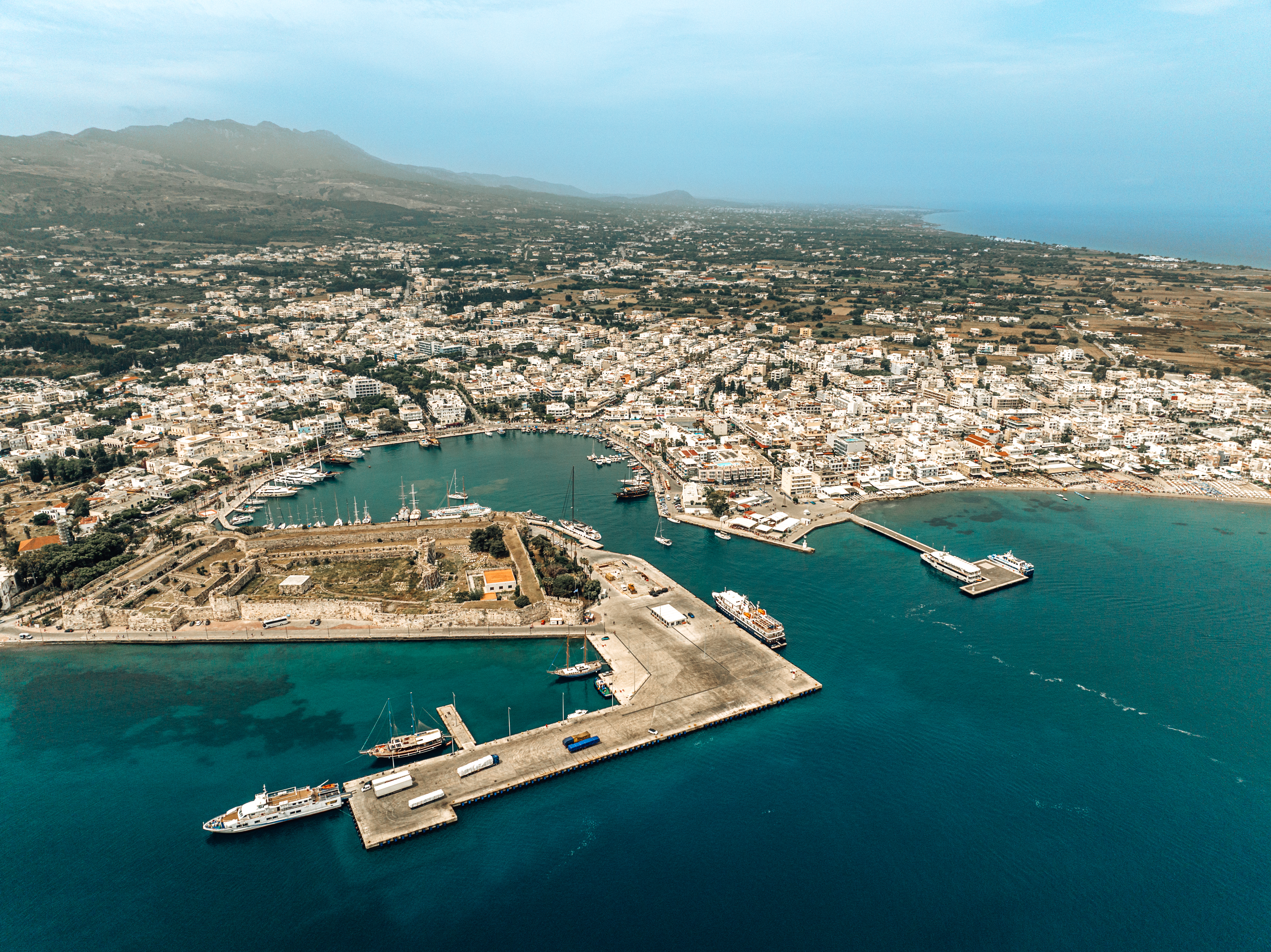
- Aerial view of Kos town

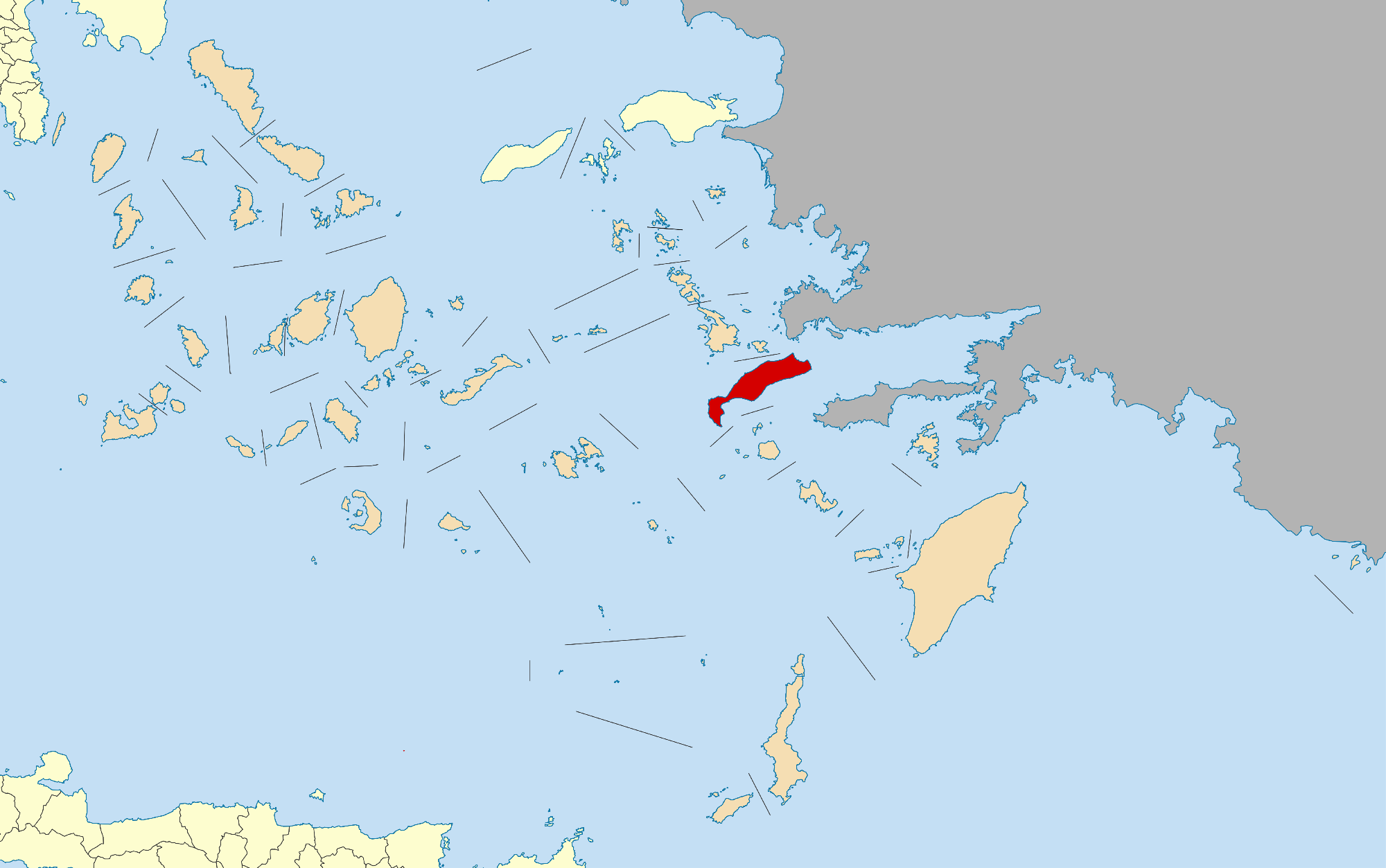

- Location within Greece
- Coordinates: 36°51′N 27°14′E
- Country: Greece
- Administrative region: South Aegean
- Regional unit: Kos

Area
  - Municipality: 295.3 km^{2} (114.0 sq mi)
  - Municipal unit: 67.2 km^{2} (25.9 sq mi)
- Highest elevation: 843 m (2,766 ft)
- Lowest elevation: 0 m (0 ft)

Population (2021)
  - Municipality: 37,089
  - Density: 125.6/km^{2} (325.3/sq mi)
  - Municipal unit: 21,430
  - Municipal unit density: 319/km^{2} (826/sq mi)
- Demonym(s): Koan, Coan
- Time zone: UTC+2 (EET)
  - Summer (DST): UTC+3 (EEST)
- Postal code: 853 xx
- Area code: 2242
- Vehicle registration: ΚΧ, EA
- Website: www.kos.gr

Kos or Cos (/kɒs, kɔːs/; Greek: Κως [kos]) is a Greek island, part of the Dodecanese island chain in the southeastern Aegean Sea. Kos is the third largest island of the Dodecanese, after Rhodes and Karpathos; it has a population of 37,089 (2021 census), making it the second most populous of the Dodecanese after Rhodes. The island measures 42.1 by 11.5 kilometres (26 by 7 miles). Administratively, Kos constitutes a municipality within the Kos regional unit, which is part of the South Aegean region. The principal town of the island and seat of the municipality is the town of Kos.

== Name ==
The name Kos (Ancient Greek: Κῶς) is first attested in the Iliad, and has been in continuous use since. Other ancient names include Meropis, Cea, and Nymphaea.

In many Romance languages, Kos was formerly known as Stancho, Stanchio, or Stinco, and in Turkish it is known as İstanköy (Ottoman Turkish: استانكوی), all from the reinterpretation of the Greek expression εις την Κω 'to Kos'; cf. the similar Istanbul and Stimpoli, Crete. Under the rule of the Knights Hospitaller of Rhodes, it was known as Lango or Langò, presumably because of its length. In The Travels of Sir John Mandeville, the author misunderstands this and treats Lango and Kos as distinct islands. In Italian, the island is known as Coo.

A person from Kos is called a "Koan" (or "Coan") in English. The word is also an adjective, as in "Koan goods".

== Geography ==
Kos is part of the Dodecanese island chain in the southeastern Aegean Sea, and is located south of Kalymnos and Pserimos and north of Nisyros. Its coastline is 112 kilometres (70 miles) long, extending from west to east.

The island has several promontories, some with names dating from antiquity: Cape Skandari or Skandarion in the northeast; Cape Lacter or Lakter in the south; and Cape Drecanum or Drekanon in the west.

In addition to the main town and port, also called Kos, the main villages of Kos island are Kardamena, Kefalos, Tigaki, Antimachia, Mastihari, Marmari and Pyli. Smaller ones are Zia, Zipari, Platani, Lagoudi and Asfendiou.

== Climate ==
Kos has a hot-summer Mediterranean climate.

Climate data for Kos Sewage Plant weather station (37m)
Month	Jan	Feb	Mar	Apr	May	Jun	Jul	Aug	Sep	Oct	Nov	Dec	Year
Mean daily maximum °C (°F)	14.3 (57.7)	15.5 (59.9)	17.6 (63.7)	20 (68)	25 (77)	28.5 (83.3)	30.4 (86.7)	31 (88)	28.5 (83.3)	25.7 (78.3)	21.1 (70.0)	17.4 (63.3)	22.9 (73.3)
Mean daily minimum °C (°F)	9 (48)	10.1 (50.2)	11.2 (52.2)	12.9 (55.2)	16.8 (62.2)	20.9 (69.6)	23.5 (74.3)	24 (75)	22.2 (72.0)	19.6 (67.3)	15.6 (60.1)	12.3 (54.1)	16.5 (61.7)
Average precipitation mm (inches)	214.7 (8.45)	82.3 (3.24)	68.2 (2.69)	40.6 (1.60)	7.2 (0.28)	13.8 (0.54)	0 (0)	0 (0)	5.2 (0.20)	36.3 (1.43)	106 (4.2)	175.6 (6.91)	749.9 (29.54)
Source: http://penteli.meteo.gr/stations/kos/ (2019 - 2020 averages)

== Municipality ==
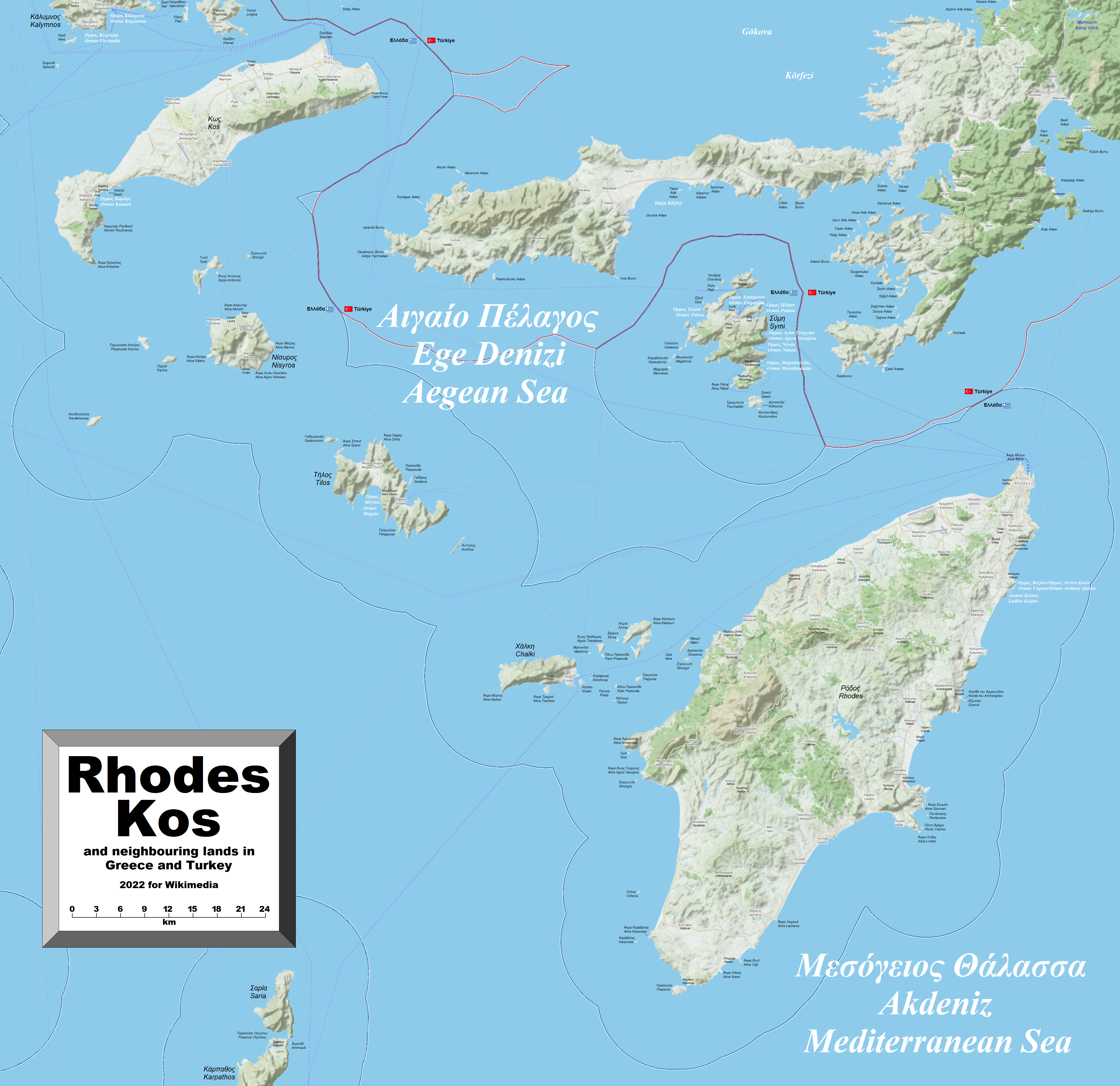
Detailed map of Kos, Rhodes and environs

The present municipality of Kos was created in 2011 with the merger of three municipalities, which became municipal units:

- Dikaios
- Irakleides
- Kos

The municipality has an area of 290,313 km^{2}, and has a municipal unit of 67.200 km^{2}.

== Economy ==
Tourism is the main industry in Kos, the island's beaches being the primary attraction. The main port and population centre on the island, Kos town, is also a tourist and cultural centre, with whitewashed buildings including many hotels, restaurants and a number of nightclubs forming the town's "bar street". The seaside village of Kardamena is a popular resort for young holidaymakers (primarily from the United Kingdom and Scandinavia) and has a large number of bars and nightclubs.

The last decade has seen a significant growth in the number of luxury hotels. While one-star and two-star hotels have decreased, four-star and five-star luxury hotels have sprung up throughout the island. From 2014 to 2023, five-star hotels have practically doubled, both in units (+95.83%) and in total beds (+103.32%). Significant but smaller, is the increase of four-star hotels, both in units (+34.15%) and in total beds (+8.5%).

Farming is the second principal occupation, with the main crops being grapes, almonds, figs, watermelons, olives, and tomatoes, along with wheat and corn. Cos lettuce (romaine lettuce) is named after the island, from where it is said to have originated.

== History ==
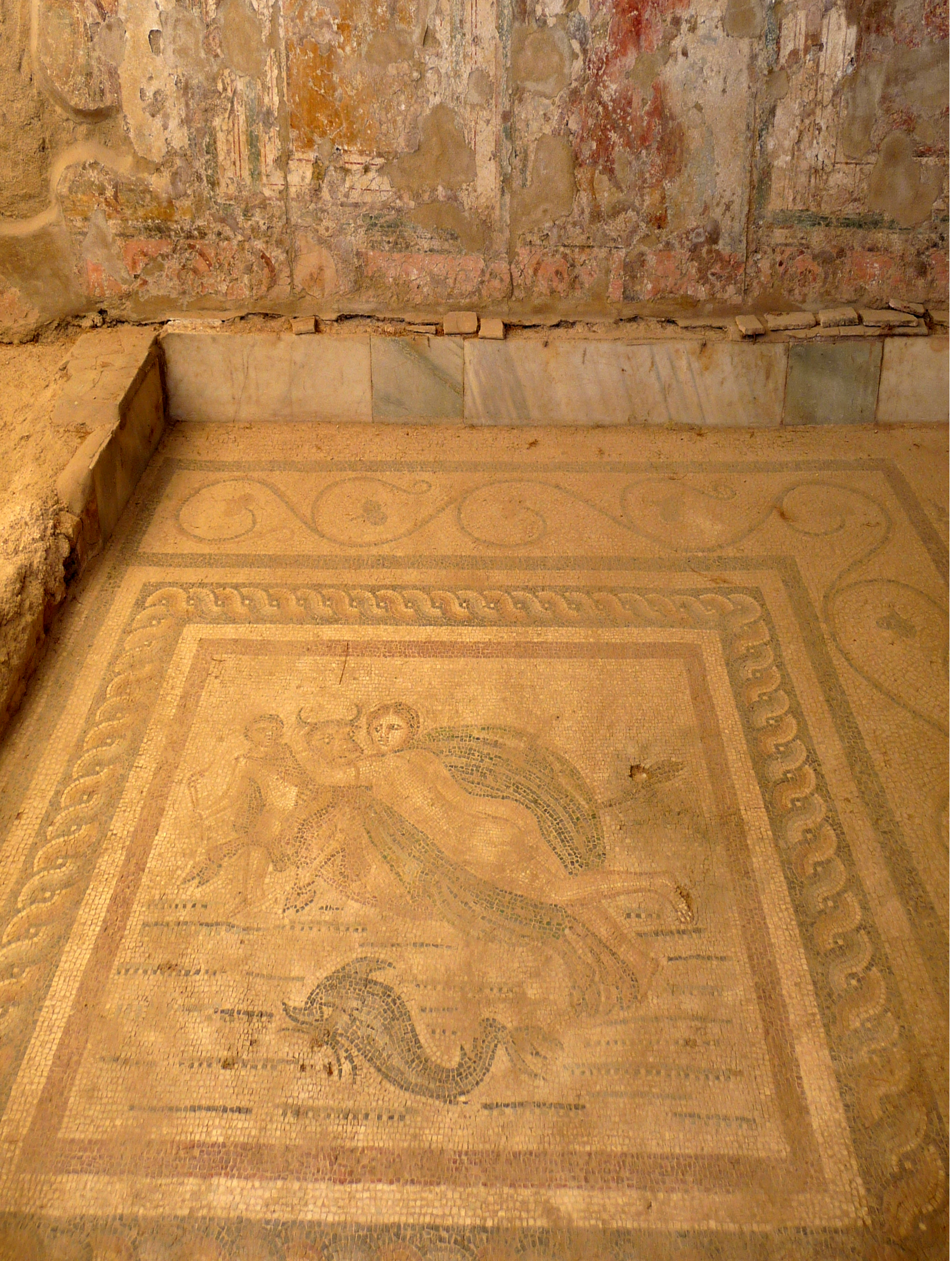
An Ancient Roman mosaic depicting the Abduction of Europa in the House of Europa in the Western Archaeological Zone of Kos town.

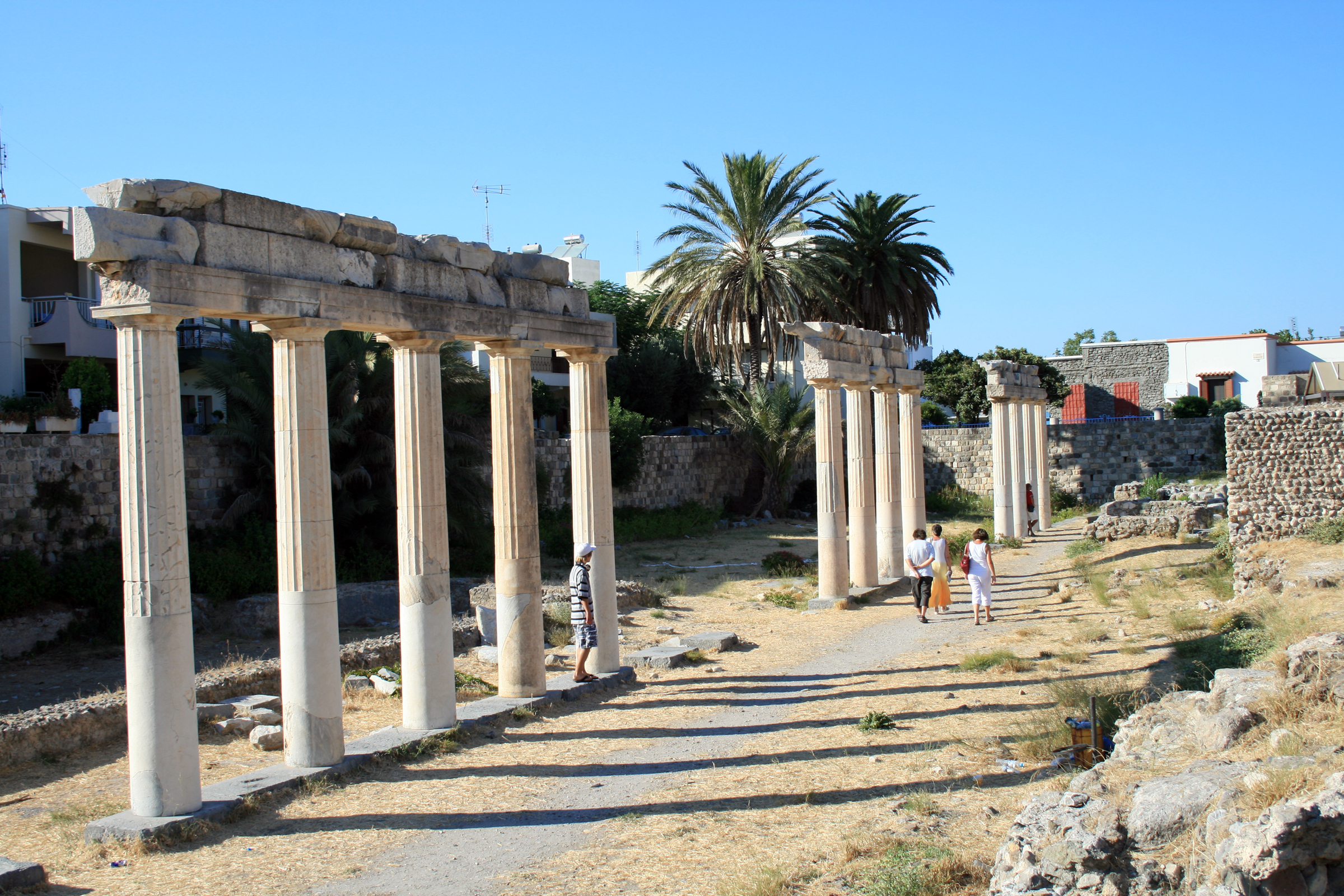
Ruins of the Ancient Gymnasion

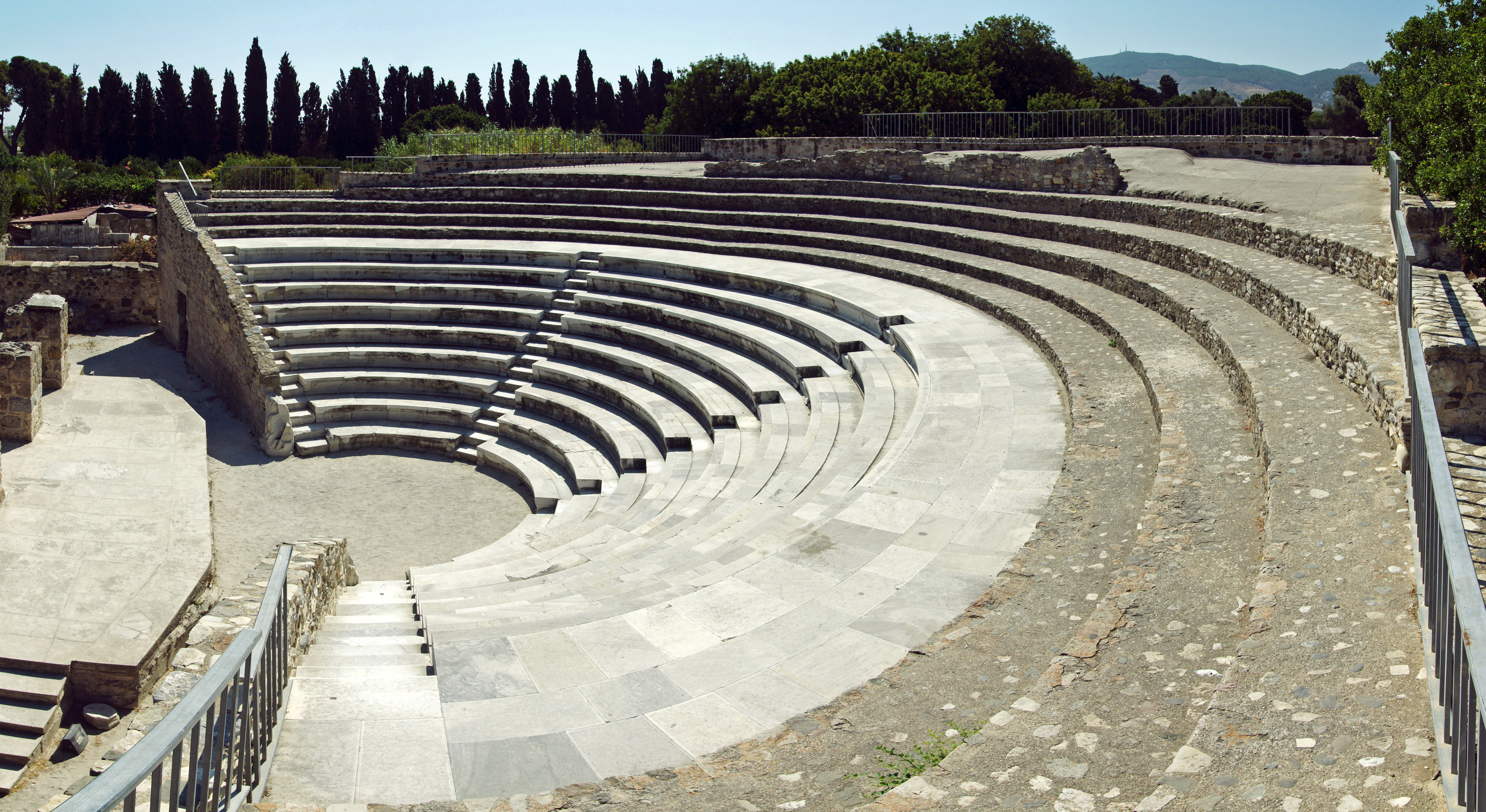
View of the ancient Odeon (heavily restored)

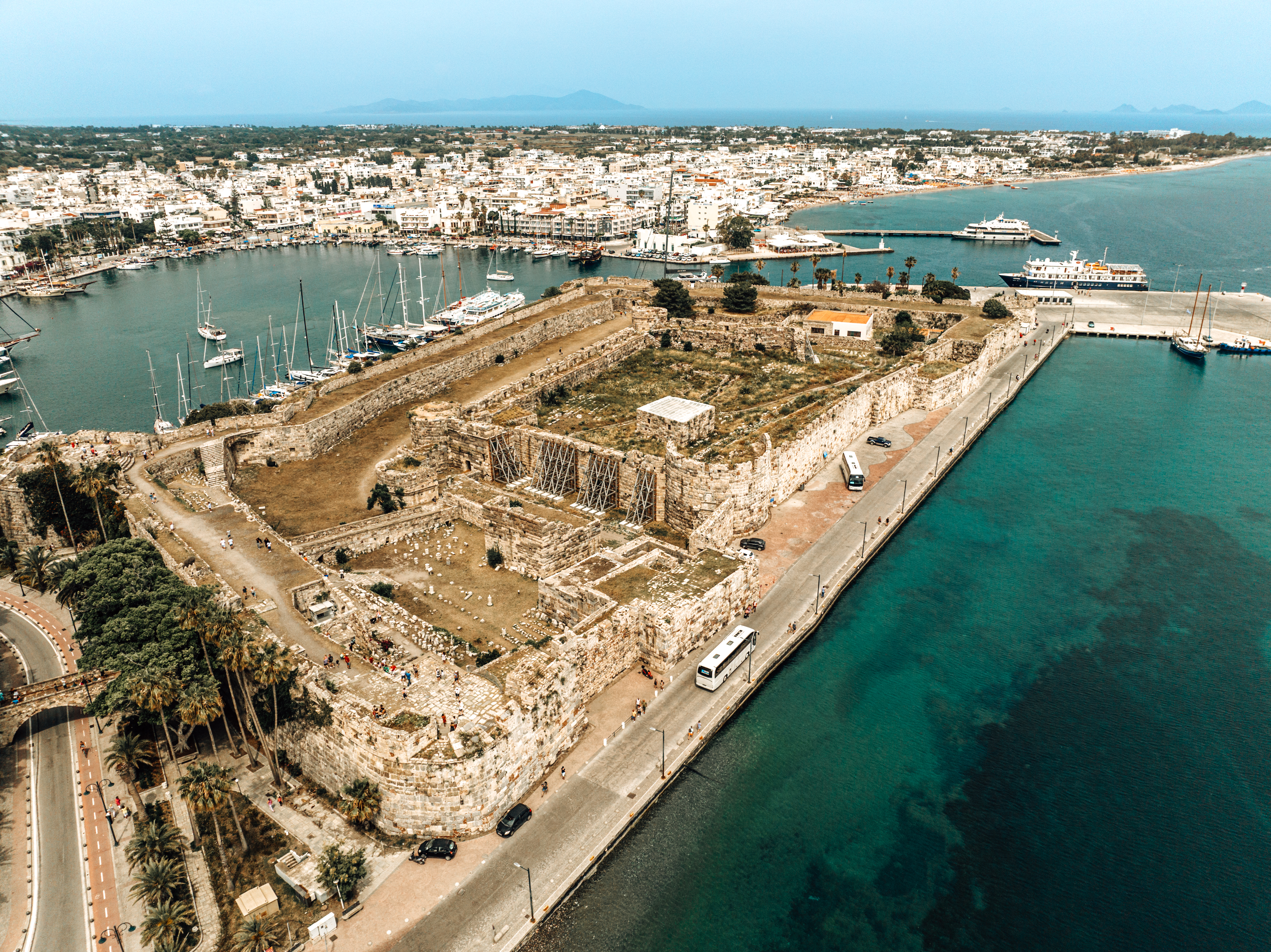
Nerantzia Castle (Hospitalier period)

=== Mythological origins ===
In Homer's Iliad, a contingent of Koans fought for the Greeks in the Trojan War.

In classical mythology the founder-king of Kos was Merops, hence "Meropian Kos" is included in the archaic Delian amphictyony listed in the 7th-century Homeric hymn to Delian Apollo; the island was visited by Heracles. Kos was said to be the birthplace of the goddess Leto; the mother of Apollo. Supposedly Leto's father Coeus was the first inhabitant of the island.

The island was supposedly colonised by the Carians, but Dorians invaded it in the 11th century BC, establishing a Dorian colony with a large contingent of settlers from Epidaurus, whose Asclepius cult made their new home famous for its sanatoria.

=== Archaic Era ===
Its early history – as part of the religious-political amphictyonic league that included Lindos, Kamiros, Ialysos, Knidos and Halicarnassus, the Doric Hexapolis (hexapolis means 'six cities' in Greek), – is obscure. At the end of the 6th century, Kos fell under Achaemenid domination but rebelled after the Greek victory at the Battle of Mycale in 479. Archaeological finds have shown the existence of a small shrine to Hemera and Helios; gods of the day and the sun respectively.

=== Classical Era ===
During the Greco-Persian Wars, before it twice expelled the Persians, Kos was ruled by Persian-appointed tyrants, but as a rule it seems to have been under oligarchic government. In the 5th century, it joined the Delian League, and, after the revolt of Rhodes, it served as the chief Athenian station in the south-eastern Aegean (411–407 BC). In 366 BC, a democracy was instituted and the capital was transferred from Astypalaea (at the west end of the island near the modern village of Kefalos) to the newly built town of Cos, laid out in a Hippodamian grid. After helping to weaken Athenian power, in the Social War (357–355 BC), it fell for a few years to king Mausolus of Caria.

Proximity to the east gave the island first access to imported silk thread. Aristotle mentions silk weaving conducted by the women of the island. Silk production of garments was conducted in large factories by female slaves.

==== Coae vestes ====
Older research believed that the island was known in antiquity for the manufacture of transparent light dresses, the coae vestes. This view goes back to Aristotle, and it has been challenged by modern research. The term Coae vestes seems to refer to a type of silk garment and not the site of production (the island of Kos). The origin of the term is ultimately unclear.

=== Hellenistic Era ===
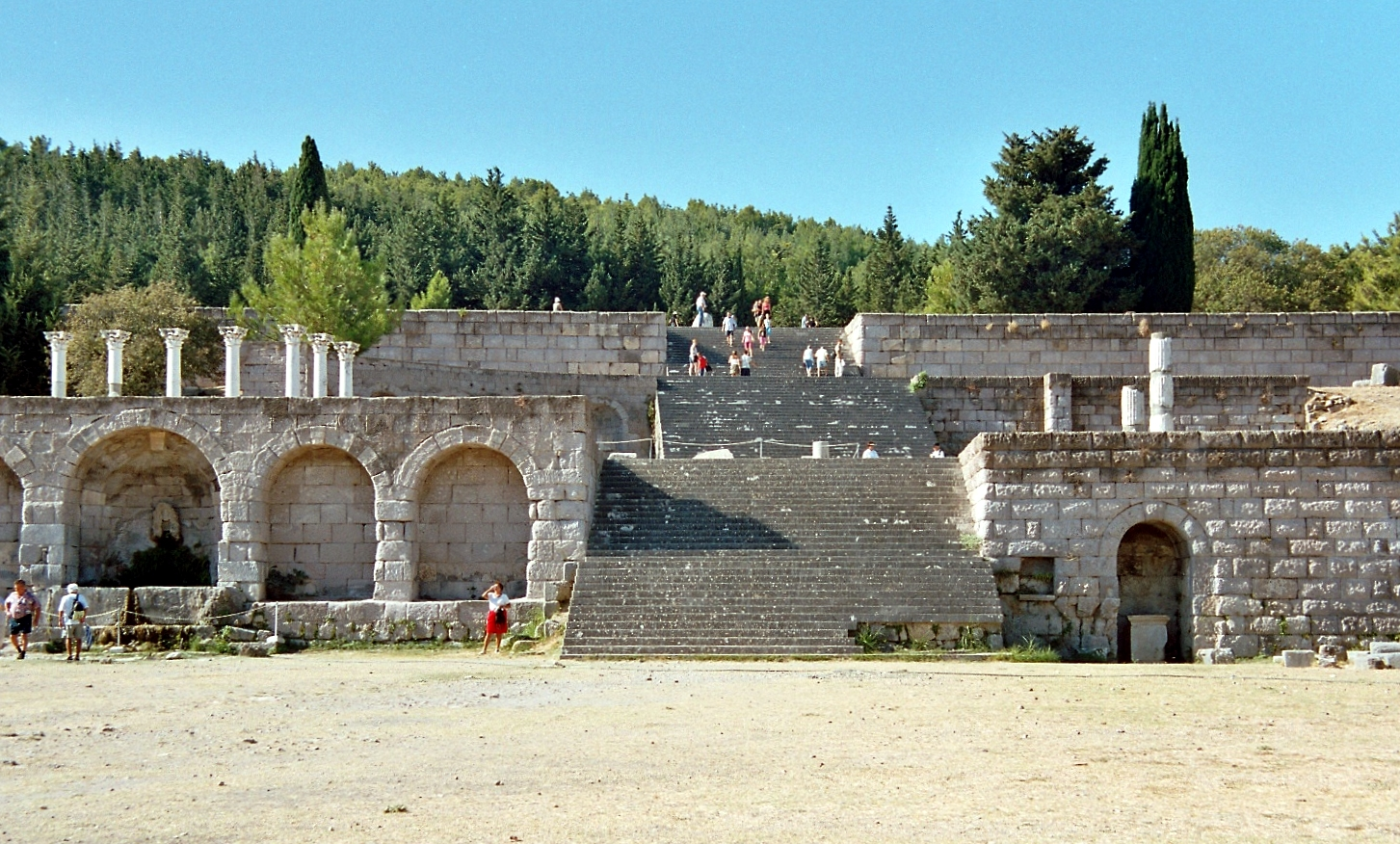
View of the Asclepeion

During the course of the Fourth War of the Diadochi Ptolemy I Soter captured Kos from Antigonus I Monophthalmus, incorporating it into his kingdom. In the Hellenistic period, Kos attained the zenith of its prosperity. Kos was valued by the Ptolemies, who used it as a naval outpost to oversee the Aegean. As a seat of learning, it arose as a provincial branch of the museum of Alexandria, and became a favourite resort for the education of the princes of the Ptolemaic dynasty. During the Hellenistic age, there was a medical school; however, the theory that this school was founded by Hippocrates (see below) during the Classical age is an unwarranted extrapolation. It was the home of the major Hellenistic poet-scholar Philitas.

Despite the incorporation of Kos into the Ptolemaic Kingdom, the island kept its political autonomy (shown in a 3rd-century BC decree found at Kos). The island was ruled autonomously through to its citizens assembly and magistrates (the monarch, the prostates, the exegetes, etc.). The fact that the city could legislate and apply its own laws shows political independence from the Ptolemaic Kingdom. The city-state remained in control of its political institutions and civil rights.

Kos also became a center of production of unrefined silk, oars and amphorae. Kos economic development during the period can further be exemplified by the 3rd- and 2nd-century BC construction of a theatre, a new market with multiple stoas, a temple to Apollo at Alisarna, construction and expansion of the Asclepeion, fortification works at Alisarna and multiple richly decorated houses. In 240 BC, Ziaelas of Bithynia, Seleucus II Callinicus and Ptolemy III Euergetes provided guarantees for the transformation of Kos Asclepeion into an asylum. This decision made Kos a more attractive destination for merchants and pilgrims.

Kos had a strong reputation for justice from the late fourth century BC and was called on more frequently than any other city in the Hellenistic period to provide judges for the arbitration of disputes between and within other cities. Between 310 and 300 BC, Kos arbitrated a dispute between Klazomenai and Teos, provided a temporary law code for the synoecism of Teos and Lebedus, and accepted requests to send judges to resolve internal disputes at Ilium, Samos, and Telos. In the following two centuries, they accepted further requests to send judges to Naxos, Thasos, Erythrae, Mytilene, and four cities whose names are not preserved. The Koan settlement of the dispute at Telos is recorded in an inscription (IG XII.4.1 132); one of the most detailed surviving records of foreign judges activities in the Hellenistic period. This judgement, drawing on Koan religious and financial regulations, allowed a group convicted of political crimes to pay off their fines and be reconciled with the wider community by paying for sacrifices and repairs to temples.

Diodorus Siculus (xv. 76) and Strabo (xiv. 657) describe it as a well-fortified port. Its position gave it a high importance in Aegean trade; while the island itself was rich in wines of considerable fame. Under Alexander the Great and the Ptolemies the town developed into one of the great centers in the Aegean; Josephus quotes Strabo to the effect that Mithridates I of the Bosporus was sent to Kos to fetch the gold deposited there by queen Cleopatra of Egypt. Herod is said to have provided an annual stipend for the benefit of prize-winners in the athletic games, and a statue was erected there to his son Herod the Tetrarch ("C. I. G." 2502 ). Paul briefly visited Kos according to Acts 21:1.

=== Roman Era ===
Except for occasional incursions by corsairs and some severe earthquakes, the island's peace was rarely disturbed. Following the lead of its larger neighbour, Rhodes, Kos generally displayed a friendly attitude toward the Romans; in 53 AD it was made a free city. The island of Kos also featured a provincial library during the Roman period. The island first became a center for learning during the Ptolemaic dynasty, and Hippocrates, Apelles, Philitas and possibly Theocritus came from the area. An inscription lists people who made contributions to build the library in the 1st century AD. One of the people responsible for the library's construction was the Koan physician Gaius Stertinius Xenophon, who lived in Rome and was the personal physician of the Emperors Tiberius, Claudius, and Nero.

Herod, king of Judaea, ensured the perpetual funding for the gymnasiarch's annual office on Kos. An inscription from the assembly of the island, dating around 14 BC, honours Gaius Iulius Herodes, affirming Herod's adoption of the Roman tria nomina; possibly relating to this financial support or another endowment.

=== Byzantine Era ===
The bishopric of Kos was a suffragan of the metropolitan see of Rhodes. Its bishop Meliphron attended the First Council of Nicaea in 325. Eddesius was one of the minority Eastern bishops who withdrew from the Council of Sardica in about 344 and set up a rival council at Philippopolis. Iulianus went to the synod held in Constantinople in 448 in preparation for the Council of Chalcedon of 451, in which he participated as a legate of Pope Leo I, and he was a signatory of the joint letter that the bishops of the Roman province of Insulae sent in 458 to Byzantine Emperor Leo I the Thracian with regard to the killing of Proterius of Alexandria. Dorotheus took part in a synod in 518. Georgius was a participant of the Third Council of Constantinople in 680–681. Constantinus went to the Photian Council of Constantinople (879). Under Byzantine rule, apart from the participation of its bishops in councils, the island's history remains obscure. It was governed by a droungarios in the 8th–9th centuries, and seems to have acquired some importance in the 11th and 12th centuries: Nikephoros Melissenos began his uprising here, and in the middle of the 12th century, it was governed by a scion of the ruling Komnenos dynasty, Nikephoros Komnenos.

Today the ecclesiastical metropolis of Kos remains under the direct authority of the Patriarchate of Constantinople, rather than the Church of Greece, and is also listed by the Catholic Church as a titular see.

=== Genoese Era ===
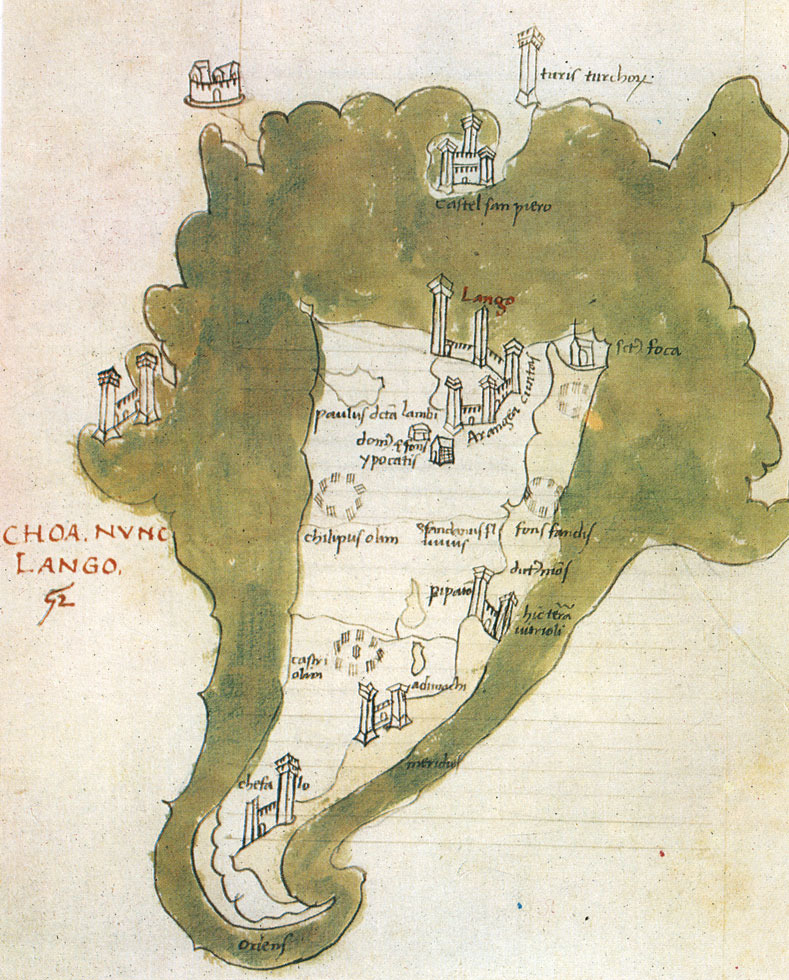
15th-century map by Cristoforo Buondelmonti

Following the 11th century, Kos passed under Genoese control, although it was a Byzantine territory and kept for a while by the Empire of Nicaea. Genoese ruled as protectorate and lasted over four centuries. In the 1320s, Kos nominally formed a part of the realm of Genoese Vignolo de Vignoli. The Knights Hospitaller were hosted over the island paying a rent to Genoese republic. From the 14th century onwards the island experienced raids of Turkish corsairs. During this period two towers were built in the southeast and southwest sections of the castle during the raids of Yıldırım Bayezid between 1391 and 1396. Kos faced its first serious Ottoman attack in 1455. The navy under the command of Hamza Bey attacked the island, besieged and destroyed the Andimacheia Castle. The last Hospitaller governor of the island was Piero de Ponte.

=== Ottoman Era ===
During the conquest of Rhodes in 1522, it was surrendered to the Ottomans due to the terms of the agreement. When Captain Behram Bey arrived in front of Kos and Bodrum, the castle guards handed over the castle to him and left, and this news reached the camp on 17 Safer 929 (5 January 1523). As soon as the island was taken, a qadi, a castellan and guards were sent to the largest and fortified castle, Nerantzia, which was repaired. The Greek Orthodox people of the island were left in their places and their residence was provided in the suburbs outside the castle.

During the course of the Orlov revolt, a Russian fleet anchored off the Kos castle. On the night of 5 August 1773, the Russians dispatched a landing party intending to capture the castle. They suffered heavy casualties in the ensuing battle. The Russian ships departed Kos two days later, having failed to achieve their objective.

According to the Ottoman General Census of 1881/82–1893, the kaza of İstanköy (استانكوی) had a total population of 12,965, consisting of 10,459 Greeks, 2,439 Muslims and 67 Jews. The island was occupied by the Kingdom of Italy on 20 May 1912.

=== Italian Rule and WWII ===
Kos was transferred to the Kingdom of Italy in 1912 after the Italo-Turkish War. The Italians developed the infrastructures of the island, after the ruinous earthquake of 23 April 1933, which destroyed a great part of the old city and damaged many new buildings. Architect Rodolfo Petracco drew up the new city plan, transforming the old quarters into an archaeological park, and dividing the new city into a residential, an administrative, and a commercial area.

In World War II, the island, as an Italian possession, was controlled by the Axis, until the Italians surrendered in 1943. British and German forces then clashed for control of the island in the Battle of Kos as part of the Dodecanese Campaign, in which the Germans were victorious. Following the battle, 100 Italian officers who had refused to join the Germans were executed in what became known as the Massacre of Kos. German troops occupied the island until 1945, when it became a protectorate of the United Kingdom, which ceded it to the Kingdom of Greece in 1947 following the Paris Peace Treaty.

=== Contemporary ===
There is a Closed Controlled Access Centre (CCAC), i.e. a refugee camp, with a stated capacity of 2,140. It is one of a number on Greek islands.

== Geology ==
The island is part of a chain of mountains from which it became separated after earthquakes and subsidence that occurred in ancient times. The remnants of these mountains include the islands of Kalymnos and Kappari which are separated by an underwater chasm approximately 70 metres (230 ft; 38 fathoms) deep, as well as the volcano of Nisyros and the surrounding islands.

There is a wide variety of rocks in Kos which is related to its geographical formation. Prominent among these are the Quaternary layers in which the fossil remains of mammals such as horses, hippopotami and elephants have been found. The fossilised molar of an elephant of gigantic proportions was presented to the Paleontology Museum of the University of Athens.

== Religion ==
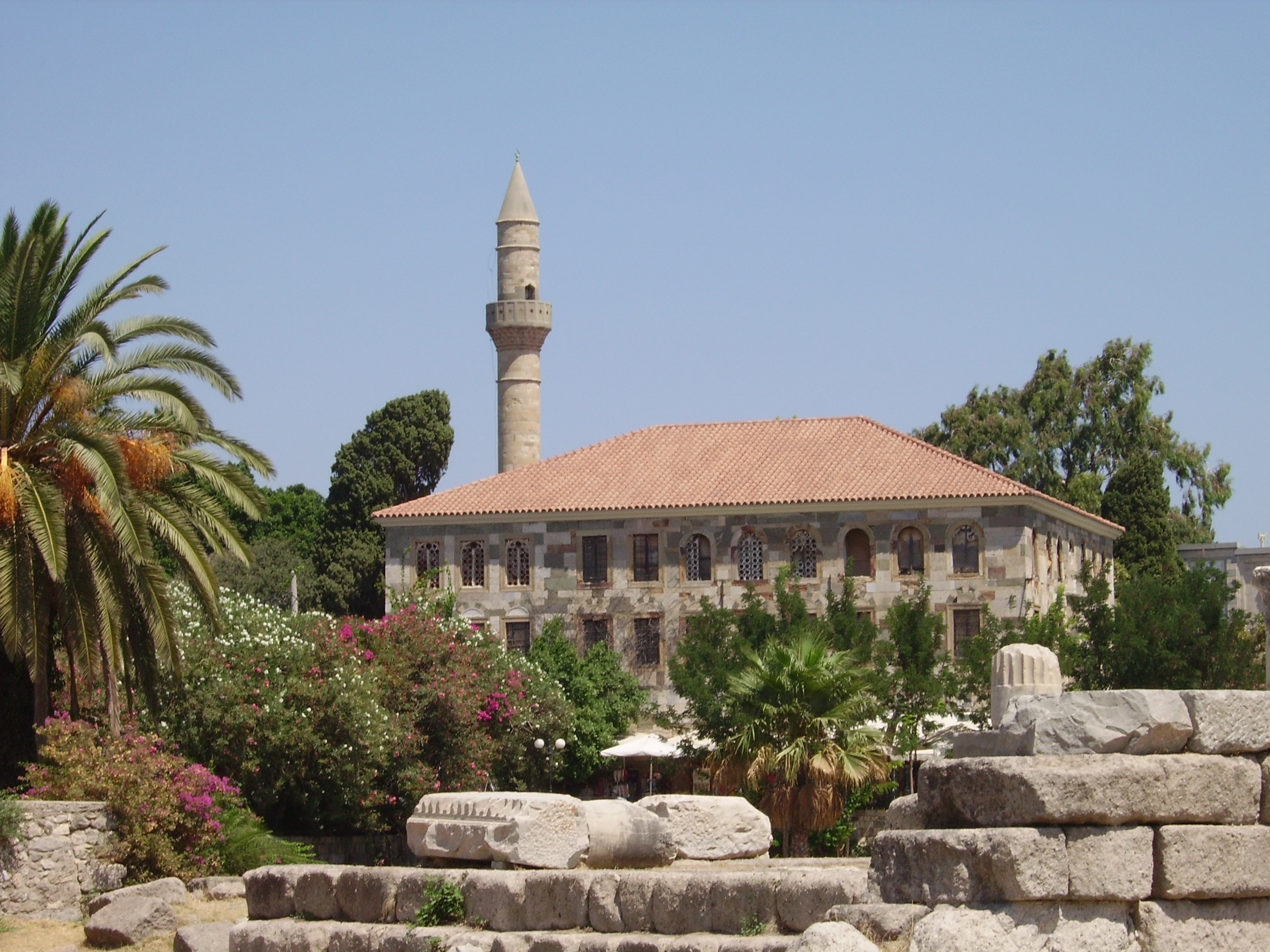
Gazi Hasan Pasha Mosque in Kos

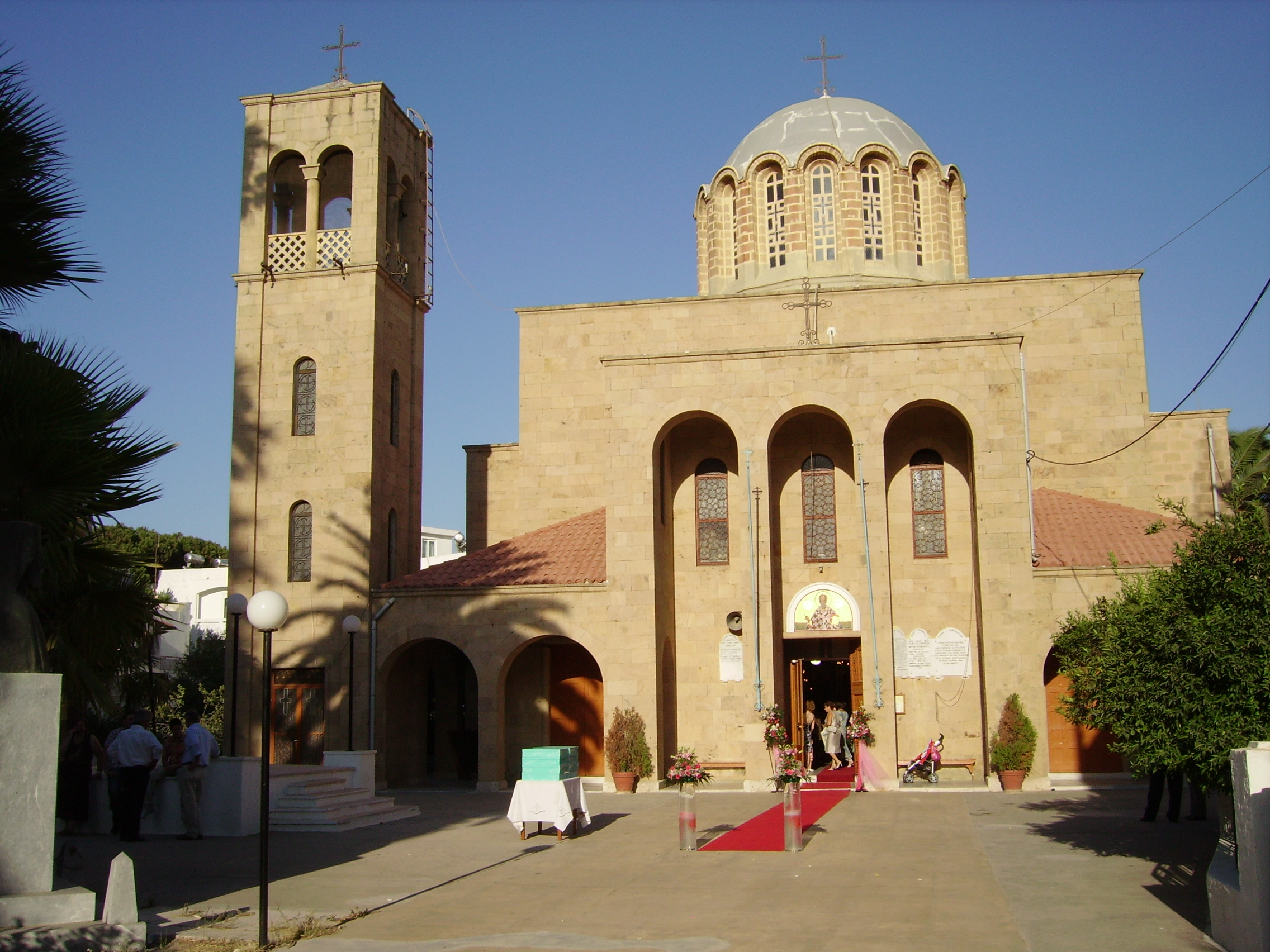
Orthodox Cathedral of Kos

The people of Kos are predominantly Orthodox Christians; one of the four Orthodox cathedrals in the Dodecanese is located in Kos. In addition, there is a Roman Catholic church on the island and a mosque for the Turkish Muslim community. The synagogue is no longer used for religious ceremonies, as the Jewish community of Kos was targeted and destroyed by occupying German forces in World War II. It has, however, been restored and is maintained with all religious symbols intact, and is now used by the Municipality of Kos for various events, mainly cultural.

In the late 1920s, about 3,700 Turks lived in Kos city; slightly less than 50% of the population, who were mainly in the west part of the city. Today, the population of the Turkish community in Kos has been estimated at 2,000 people. A village with a significant Turkish population is Platani (Kermentes), near the town of Kos.

== Main sights ==
=== Ancient sites ===
The ancient physician Hippocrates is thought to have been born in Kos, and in the center of the town is the Plane Tree of Hippocrates; a dream temple where the physician is traditionally supposed to have taught. The limbs of the now elderly tree are supported by scaffolding. The small city is also home to the International Hippocratic Foundation of Kos, and the Hippocratic Museum dedicated to him. Near the institute are the ruins of Asklepieion, where Herodicus taught Hippocrates medicine.

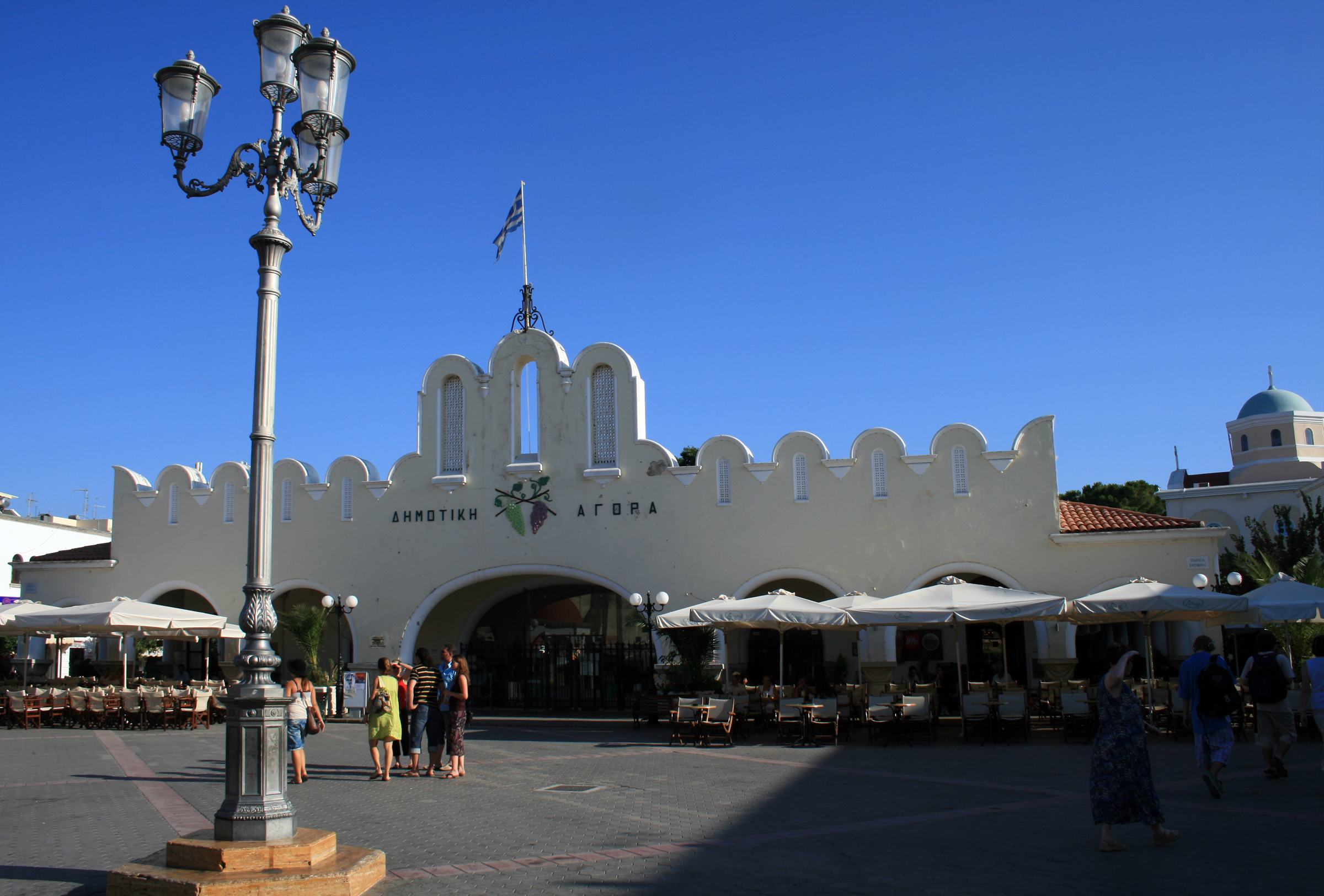
View of the municipal market, built in 1934–1935 by architect Rodolfo Petracco.

The ancient market place of Kos was considered one of the biggest in the ancient world. It was the commercial and commanding centre at the heart of the ancient city. It was organised around a rectangular yard 50 metres (160 ft) wide and 300 metres (980 ft) long. It began in the Northern area and ended south on the central road (Decumanus) which went through the city. The northern side connected to the city wall towards the entrance to the harbour. Here there was a monumental entrance. On the eastern side there were shops. In the first half of the 2nd century BC, the building was extended toward the interior yard. The building was destroyed in an earthquake in 469 AD.

In the southern end of the market, there was a round building with a Roman dome and a workshop which produced pigments including Egyptian Blue. Coins, treasures, and copper statues from Roman times were later uncovered by archaeologists. In the western side excavations led to the findings of rooms with mosaic floors which showed beastfights, a theme popular in Kos.

=== Castles ===
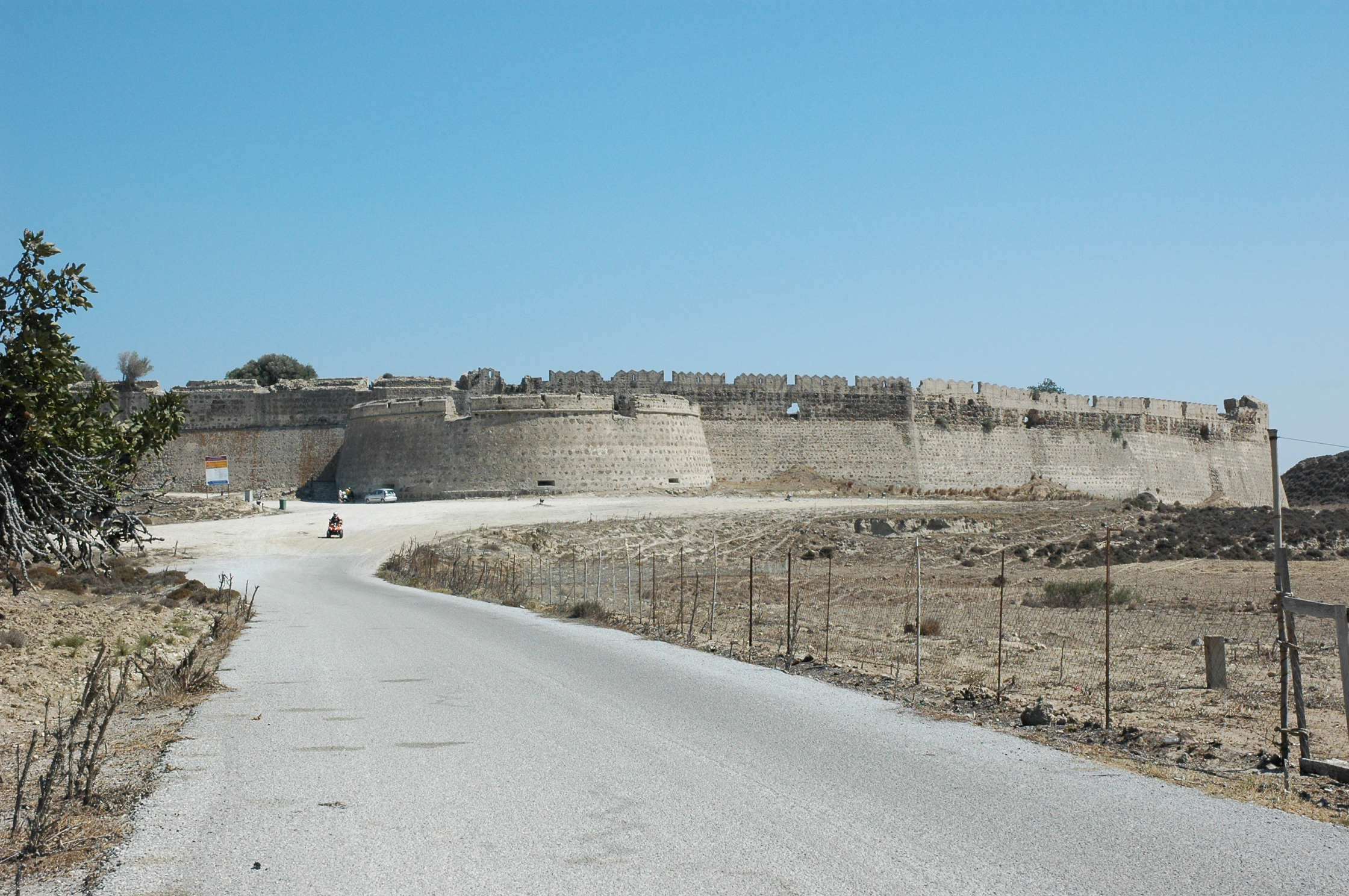
The Byzantine Antimachia Castle

The island has a 14th-century fortress at the entrance to its harbour, erected in 1315 by the Knights Hospitaller, and another from the Byzantine period in Antimachia.

=== Synagogue ===
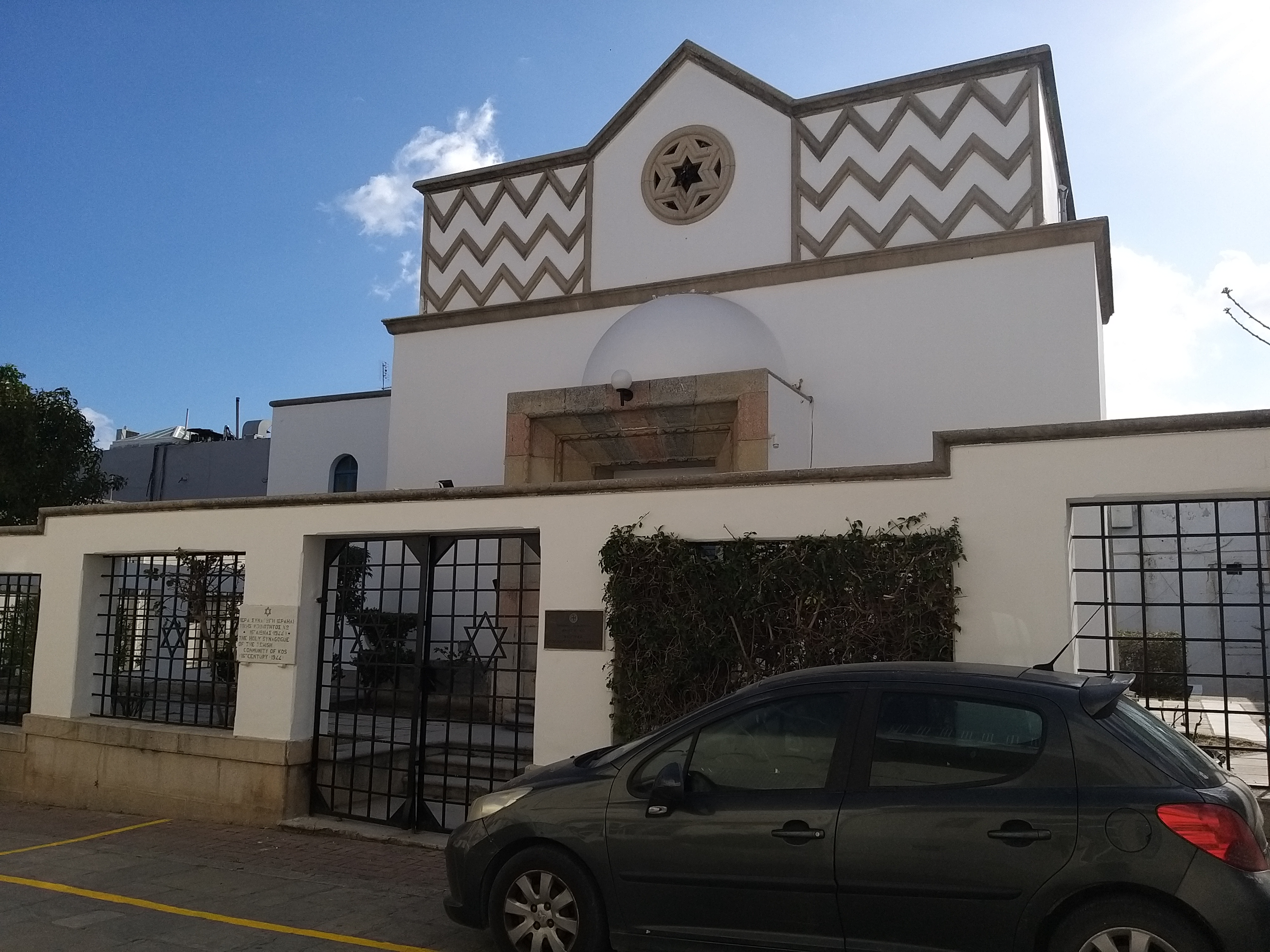
The synagogue Kahal Shalom designed by architects Armando Bernabiti and Rodolfo Petracco in 1935.

The synagogue Kahal Shalom of Kos, on 4, Alexandrou Diakou street in the historic city center, was built in 1935. It was designed by architects Armando Bernabiti and Rodolfo Petracco, and was built by the construction company 'De Martis-Sardelli'. The synagogue complex includes the synagogue and the adjacent rabbi's residence, today housing the offices of the organisation 'Hippocrates'. The Jewish community of Kos dates from antiquity. An older synagogue was destroyed in the earthquake of 13 April 1933. Following the deportation of nearly 100 members of the Jewish community on Sunday 23 July 1944, the synagogue was abandoned and later purchased by the Municipality in the 1980s. The synagogue has been used as a cultural center by the Municipality of Kos, for lectures and exhibitions. In 2022 the Municipality of Kos and the Central Board of Jewish Communities, commissioned architect Elias V. Messinas to restore the interior of the synagogue, and make possible a dual use of the building for religious services, and cultural activities.

== People ==
- Epicharmus of Kos (6th–5th century BC), comic playwright
- Hippocrates (5th century BC), "father of medicine"
- Apelles (4th century BC), painter
- Philitas of Cos (4th century BC), poet and scholar
- Ptolemy II Philadelphus (4th century BC), Pharaoh of the Ptolemaic Kingdom
- Berossus, who according to Vitruvius's work de Architectura, eventually relocated to the island of Kos, off the coast of Asia Minor, where he established a school of astrology under the patronage of the king of Egypt.
- Michael Kefalianos, professional bodybuilder
- Marika Papagika, early 20th-century singer
- Ioannis Sarmas, judge and caretaker Prime Minister of Greece in 2023
- Kostas Skandalidis, former Interior Minister of Greece and close associate of Prime Minister Andreas Papandreou
- Al Campanis, Major League Baseball player and executive
- Stergos Marinos, former professional footballer
- Şükrü Kaya, Turkish politician, who served as Minister of the Interior and Minister of Foreign Affairs of Turkey. He was one of the perpetrators of the Armenian genocide.

== Transport ==
- Kos International Airport

== In popular culture ==
- Kos is the setting of the wargaming book Swords of Kos Fantasy Campaign Setting, written by Michael O. Varhola with co-authors.
- Kos was the main shooting location and setting for Signs of Life (1968 film).

== Gallery ==
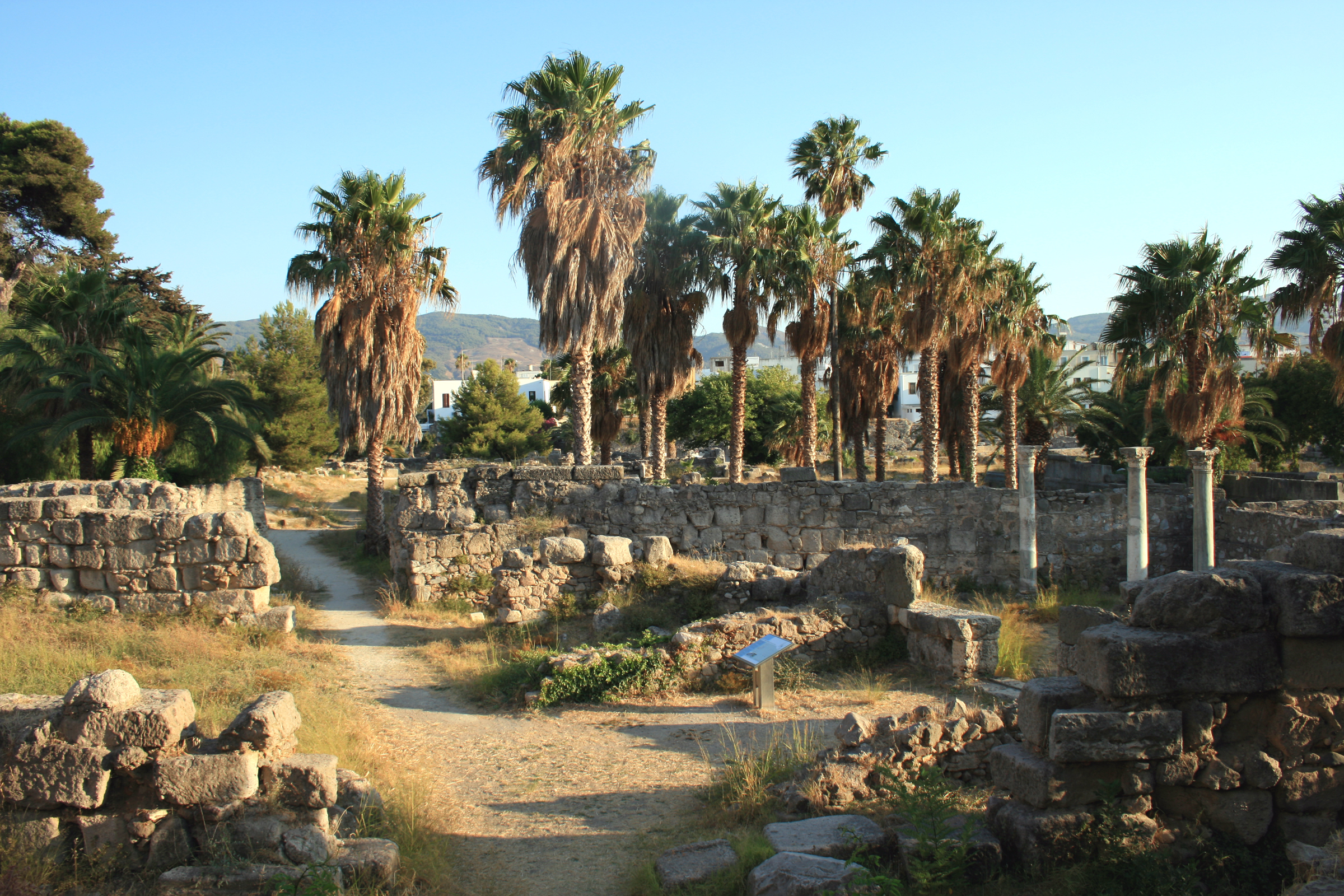
Ancient Agora

Archaeological Museum of Kos

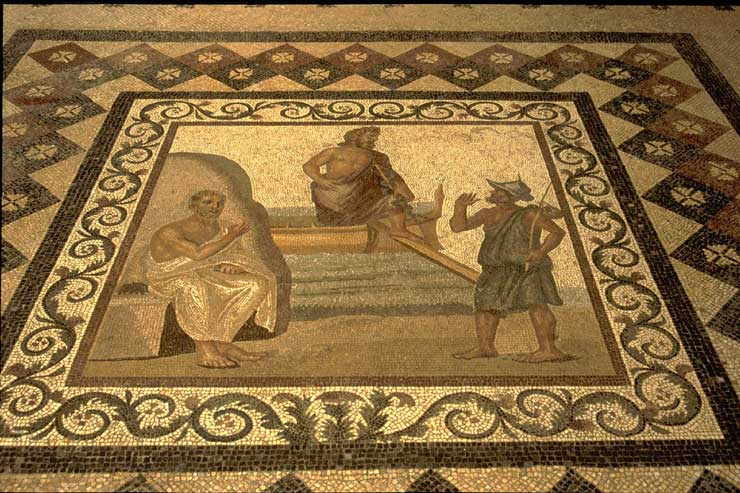
Mosaic depicting Asclepius and Hippocrates (3rd century), Archaeological Museum of Kos

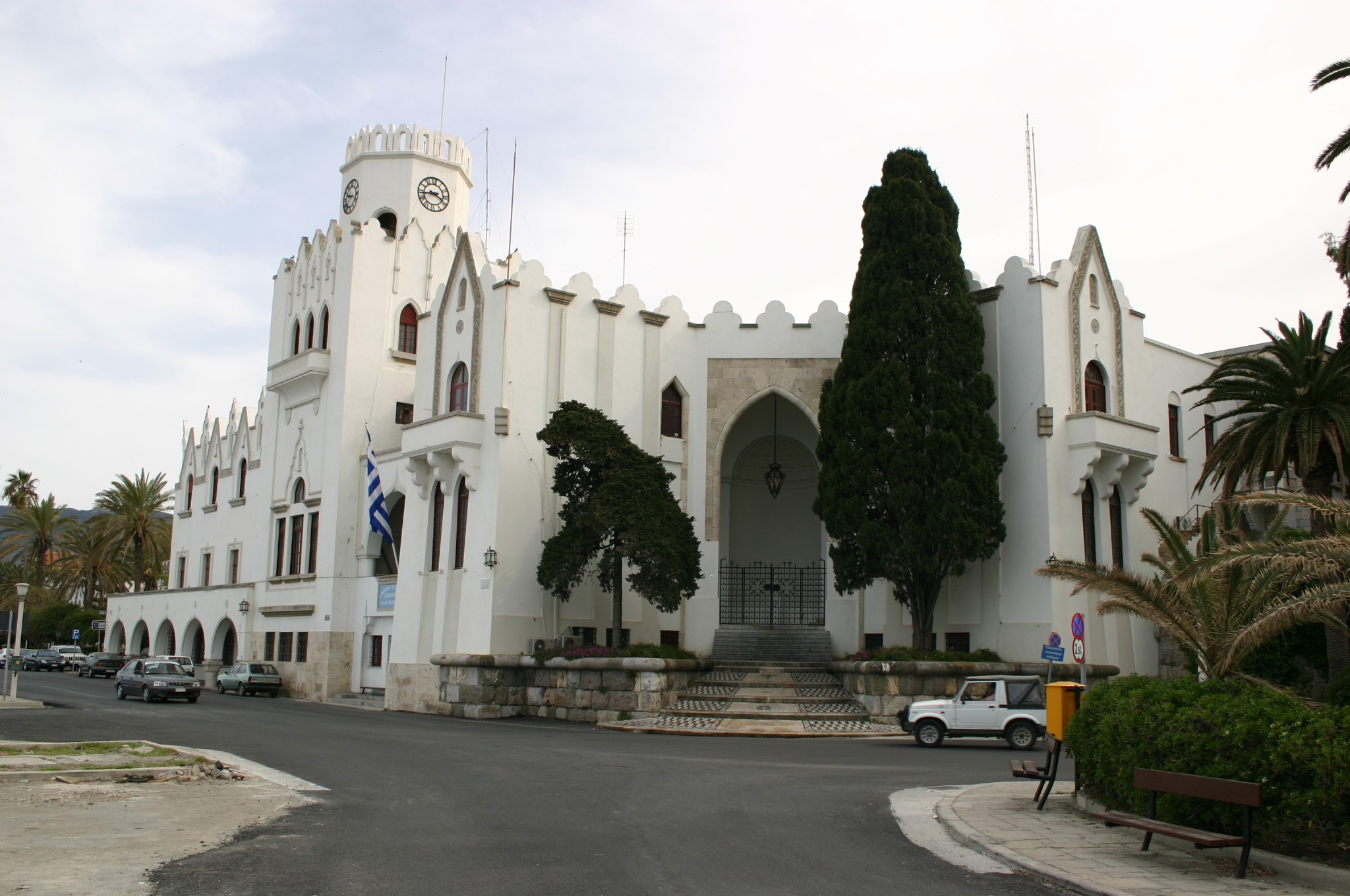
Town hall

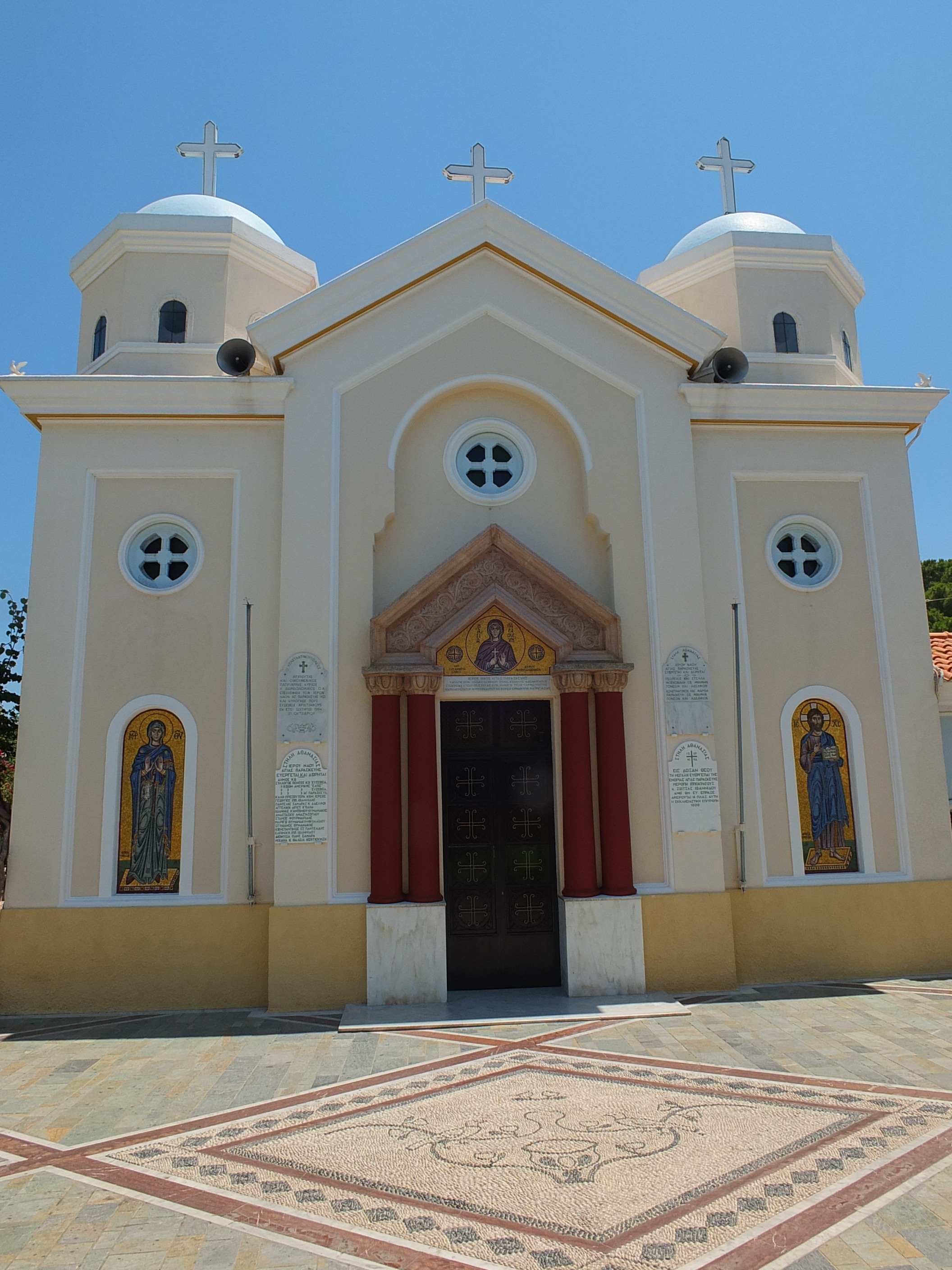
St Paraskevi church, Kos town

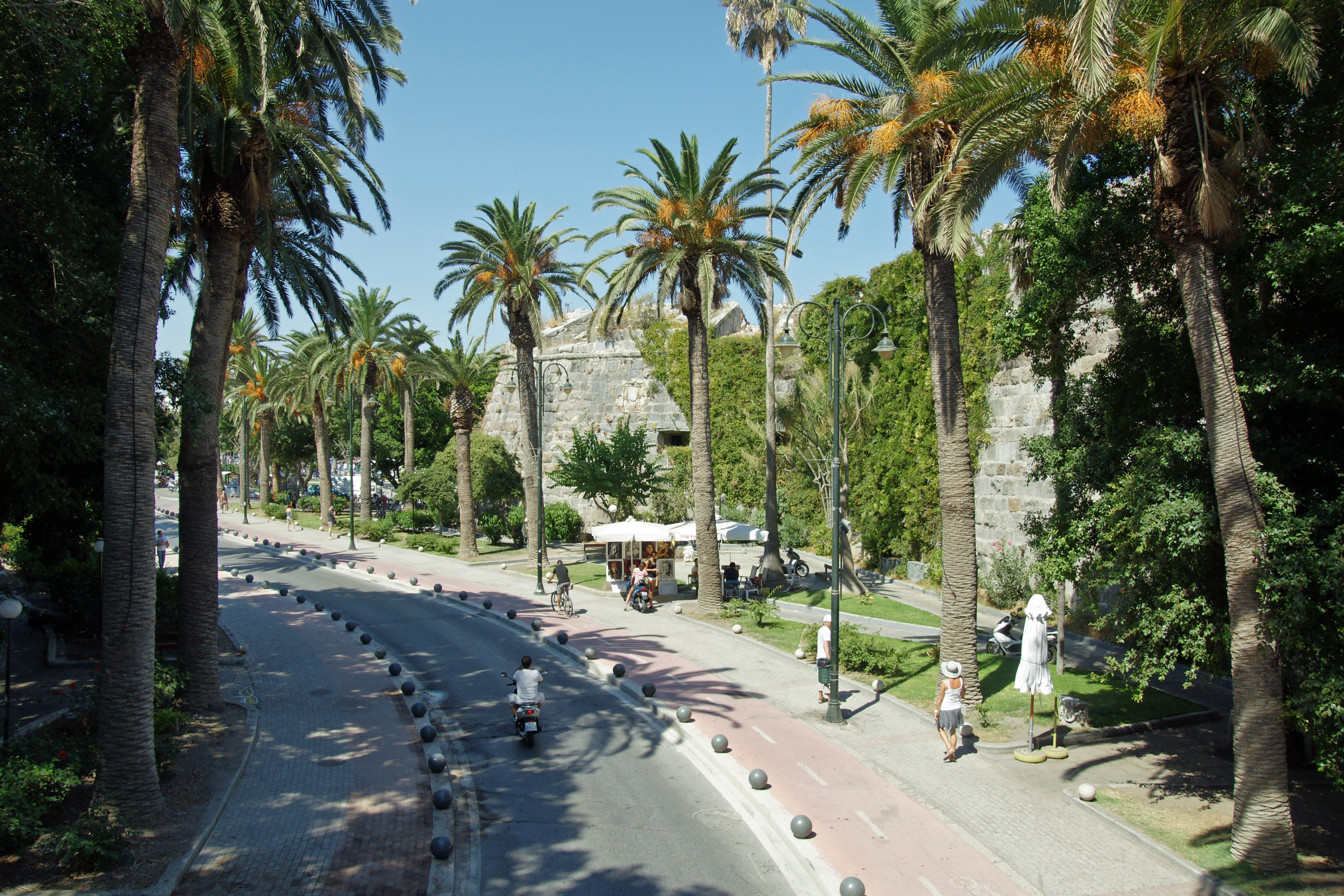
Street of Kos town

== See also ==
- Coan wine
- List of volcanoes in Greece
- List of islands of Greece#Dodecanes islands
- List of Crusader castles
- Disappearance of Ben Needham

== Sources ==
- Sartre, Maurice (2006). Ελληνιστική Μικρασία: Aπο το Αιγαίο ως τον Καύκασο [Hellenistic Asia Minor: From the Aegean to the Caucasus] (in Greek). Athens: Ekdoseis Pataki. ISBN 9789601617565.
- Scafuro, Adele C. (2021). "Koan Good Judgemanship: Working for the Gods in IG XII.4.1 132". In Mackil, Emily Maureen; Papazarkadas, Nikolaos (eds.). Greek Epigraphy and Religion: Papers in Memory of Sara B. Aleshire from the Second North American Congress of Greek and Latin Epigraphy. Leiden; Boston: Brill. pp. 248–282. ISBN 978-90-04-44254-2.
