= Kos (regional unit) =

Kos Περιφερειακή ενότητα Κω
- Regional unit
- Municipalities of the Dodecanese

- Kos within Greece

- Location within Greece
- Coordinates: 36°50′N 27°10′E
- Country: Greece
- Administrative region: South Aegean

Area
  - Total: 337.2 km^{2} (130.2 sq mi)

Population (2021)
  - Total: 38,137
  - Density: 113.1/km^{2} (292.9/sq mi)
- Time zone: UTC+2 (EET)
  - Summer (DST): UTC+3 (EEST)

Kos (Greek: Περιφερειακή ενότητα Κω) is one of the regional units of Greece. It is part of the region of South Aegean. The regional unit covers the islands of Kos, Nisyros and several smaller islands in the Aegean Sea.

== Administration ==
As a part of the 2011 Kallikratis government reform, the regional unit Kos was created out of part of the former Dodecanese Prefecture. It is subdivided into 2 municipalities. These are (number as in the map in the infobox):

- Kos (7)
- Nisyros (11)

== Province ==
The province of Kos (Greek: Επαρχία Κω) was one of the provinces of the Dodecanese Prefecture. It had the same territory as the present regional unit. It was abolished in 2006.
