= List of McDonnell Douglas F-4 Phantom II U.S. operators =

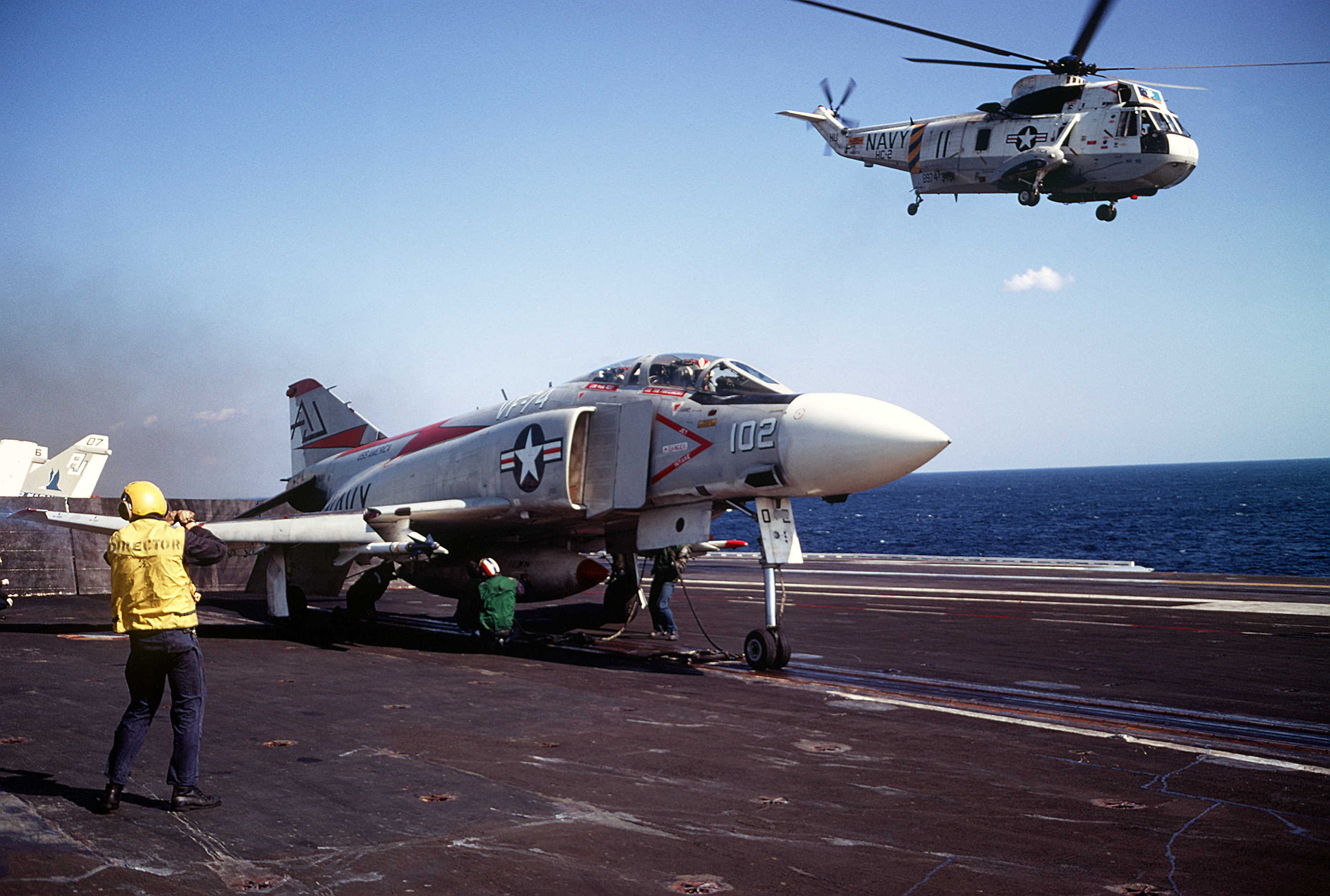
An F-4J Phantom II of Fighter Squadron VF-74 Bedevillers, about to be launched from the USS America

American units that operated the F-4 Phantom II are listed below.

== U.S. Air Force ==
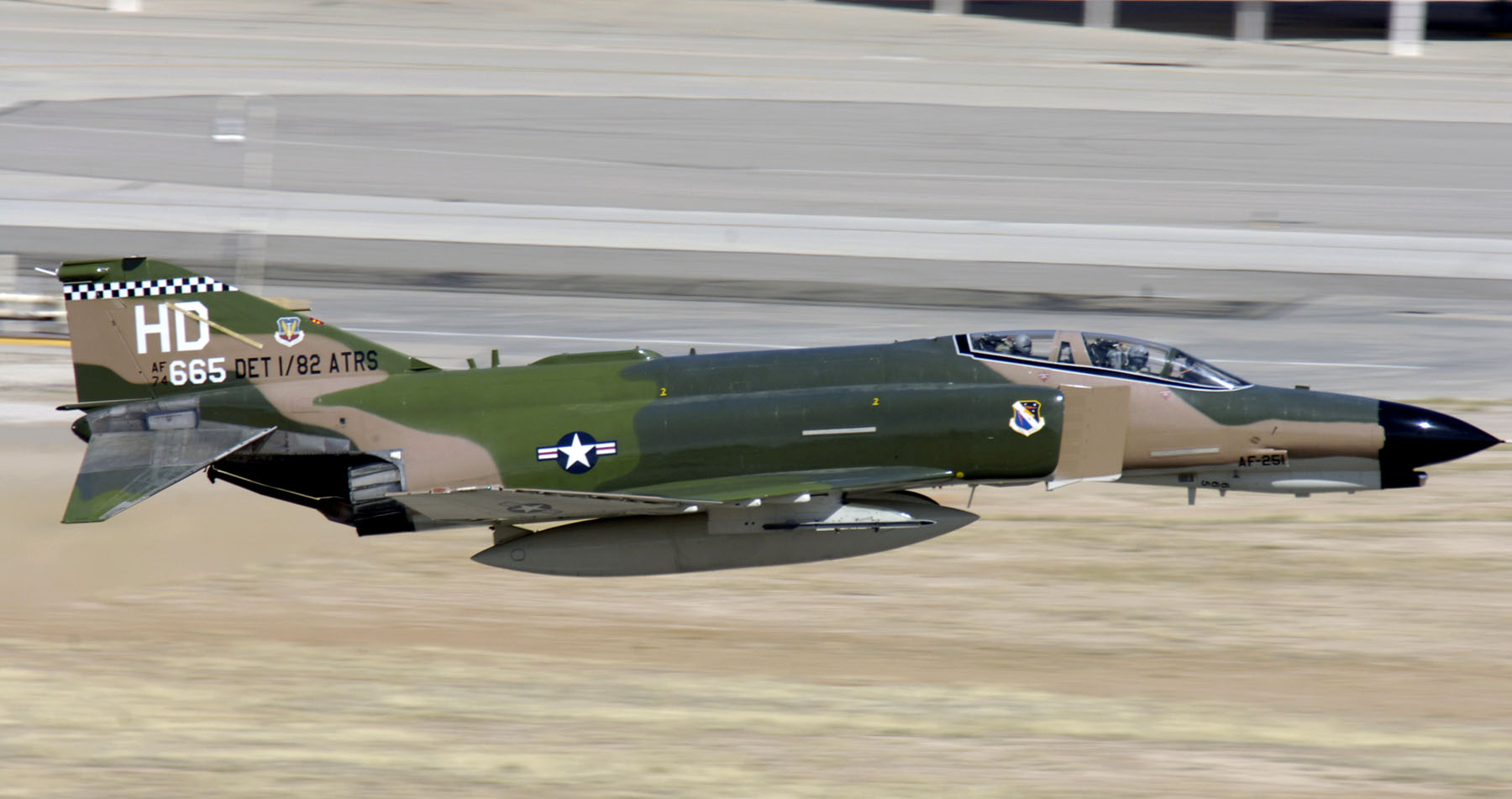
A US Air Force QF-4E Phantom takes off during a heritage demonstration in 2007

Following the test and evaluation of loaned Navy F-4Bs, the first production F-4C was delivered to U.S. Air Force in November 1963. The 4453rd Combat Crew Training Wing at MacDill AFB was the first unit to receive the Phantoms. The first combat unit to receive F-4Cs was the 12th Tactical Fighter Wing in 1964.

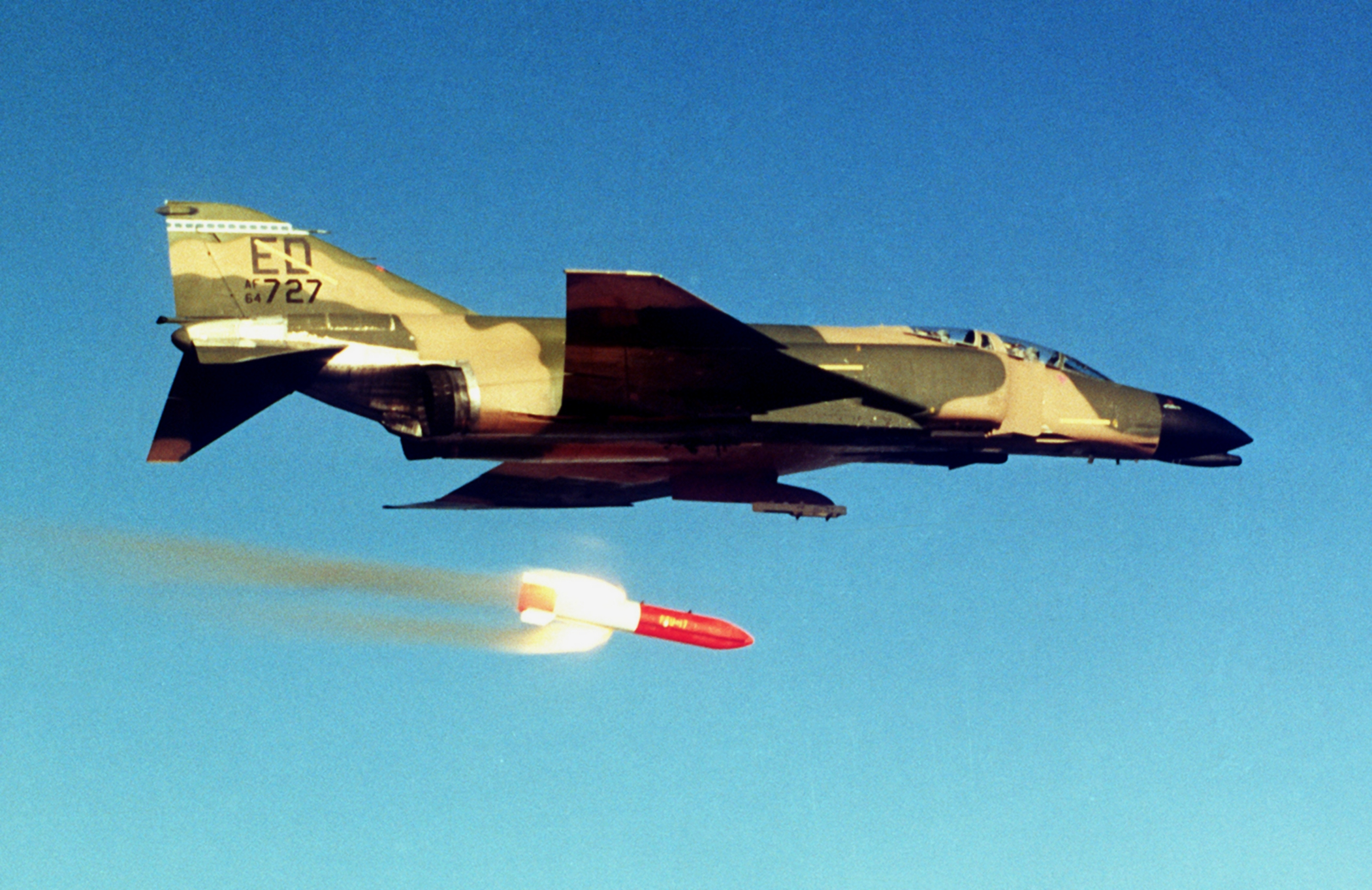
B83 nuclear bomb test with F-4C Phantom 1983

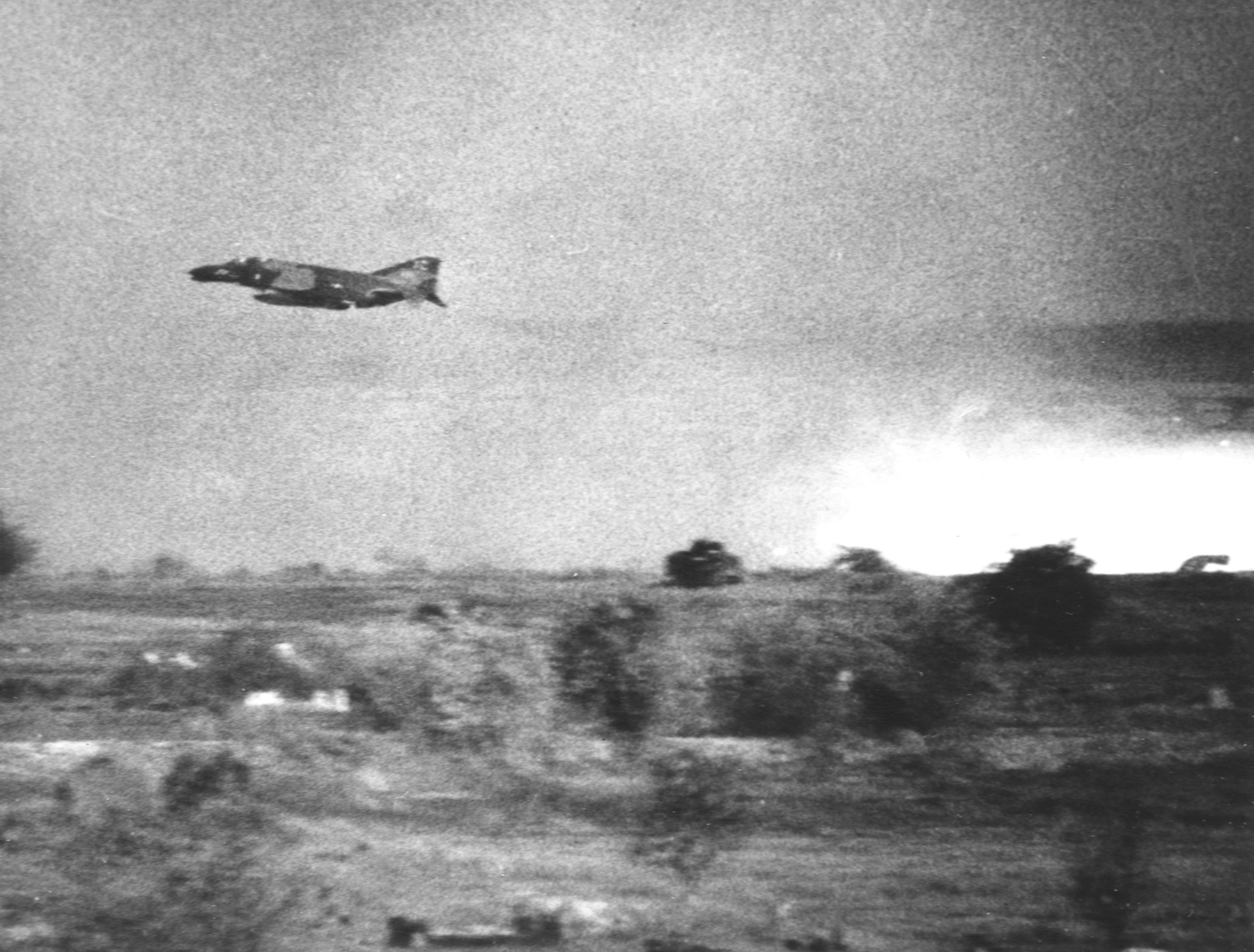
F-4C Phantom II of 557th TFS over Vietnam in 1969

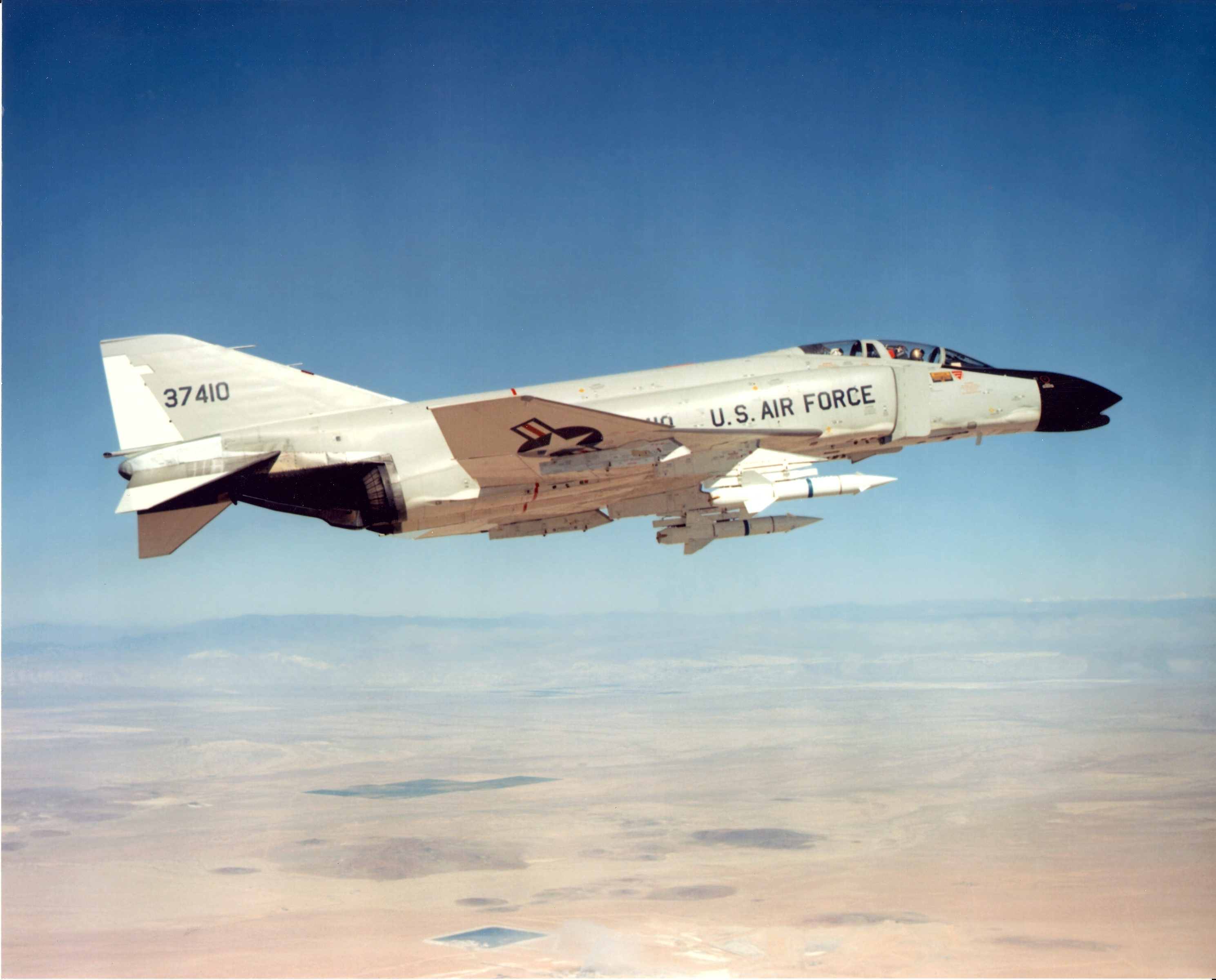
F-4C Phantom with AGM-12 Bullpups

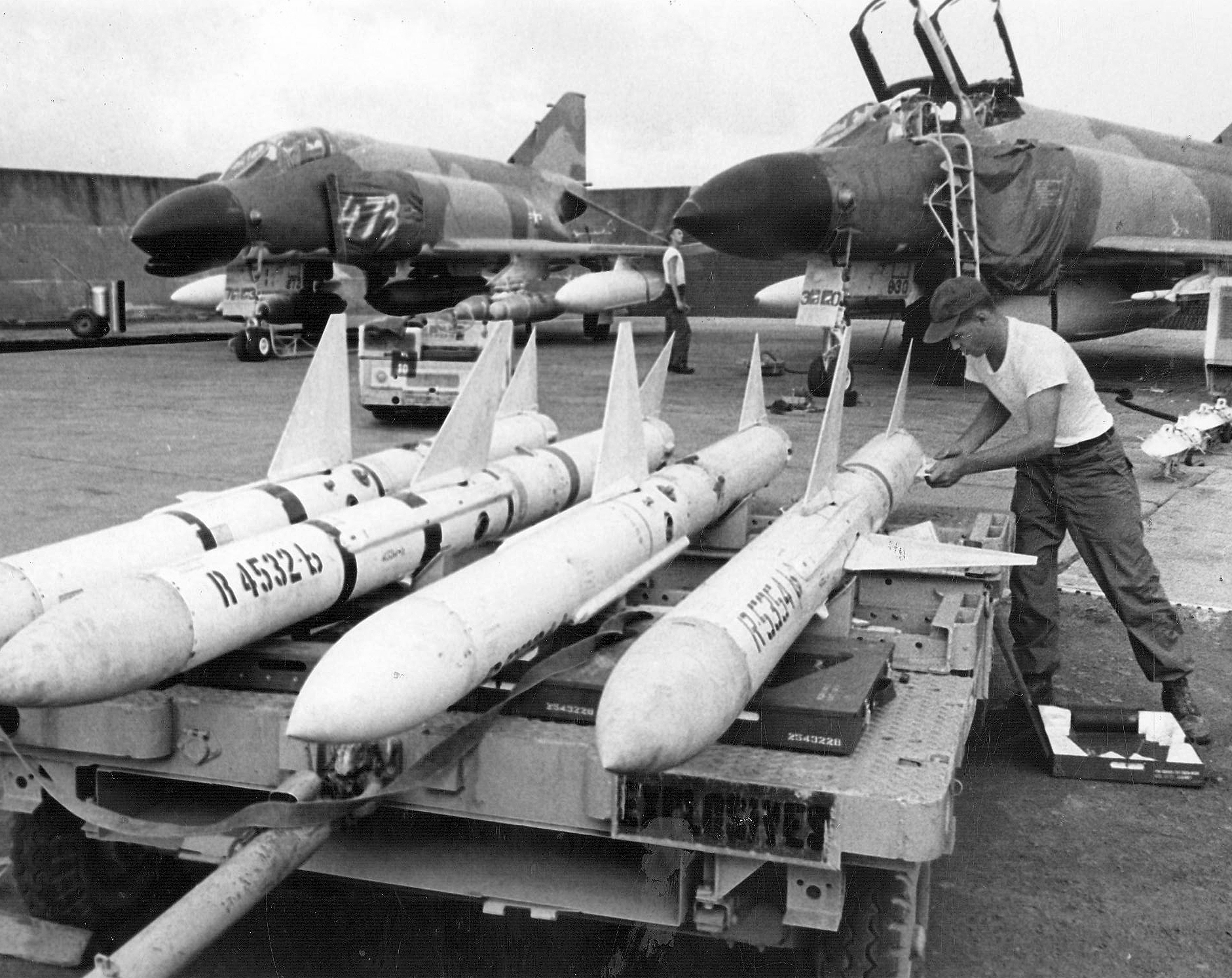
F-4C Phantoms with AIM-7 missiles at Cam Ranh 1967

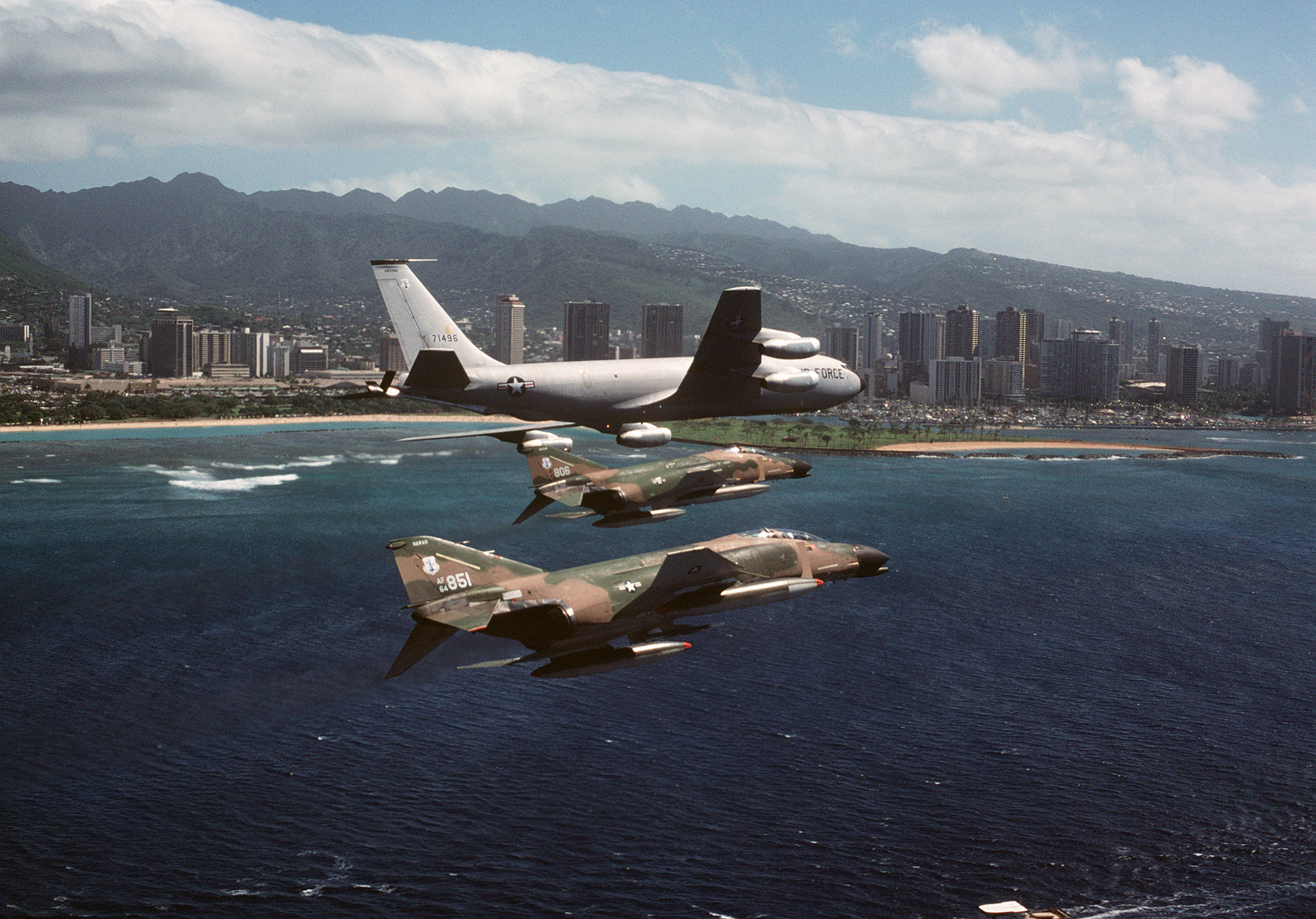
F-4Cs HawaiiANG KC-135A 1979

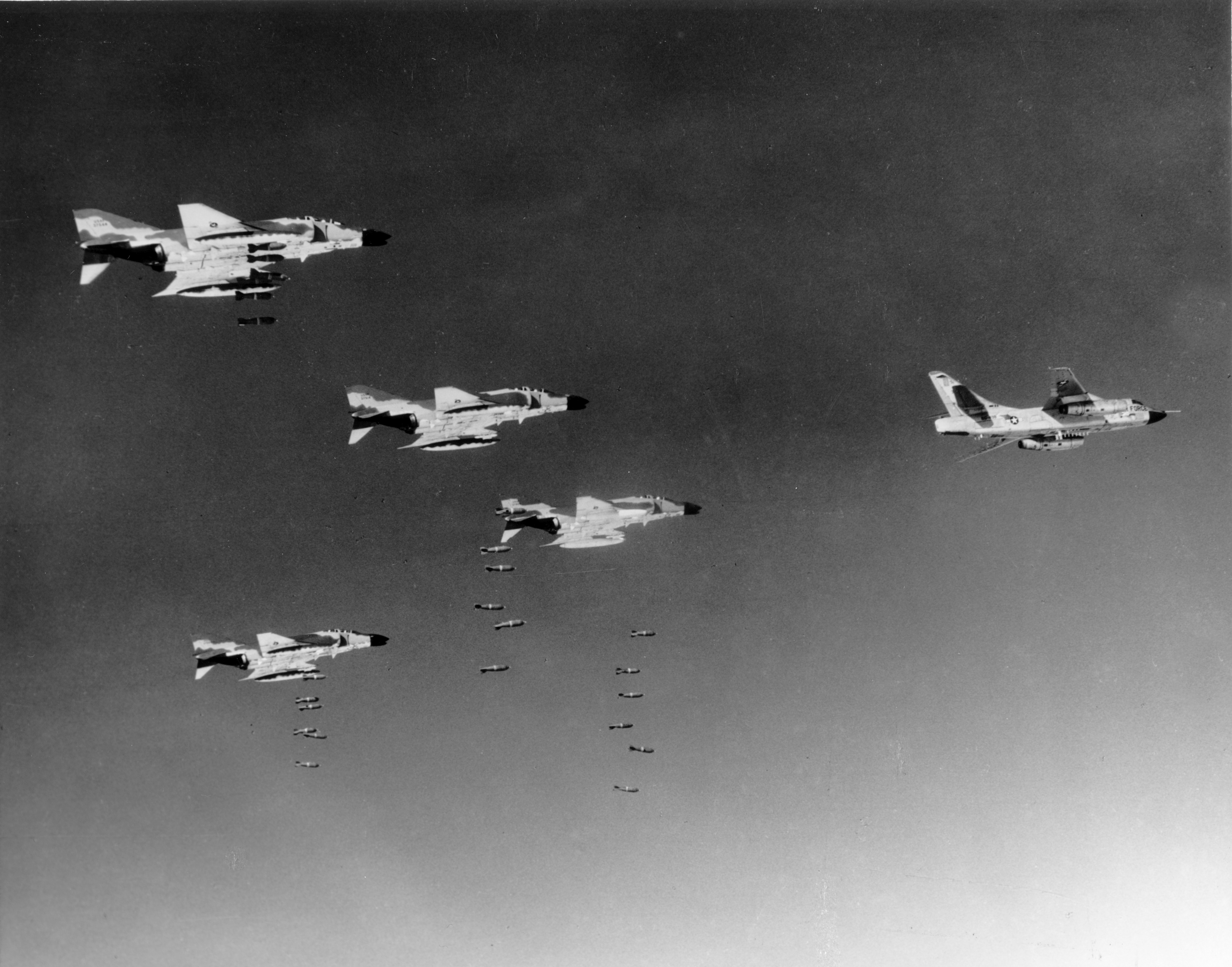
F-4Cs RB-66C bombing Vietnam 1966

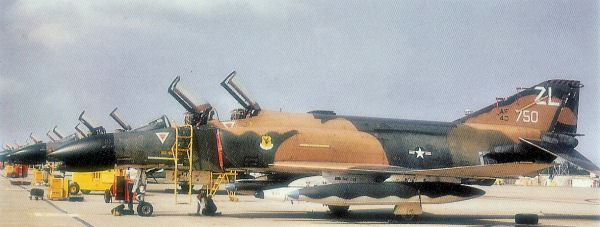
F-4Cs 18th TFW deploy at CCK Air Base Taiwan 1973

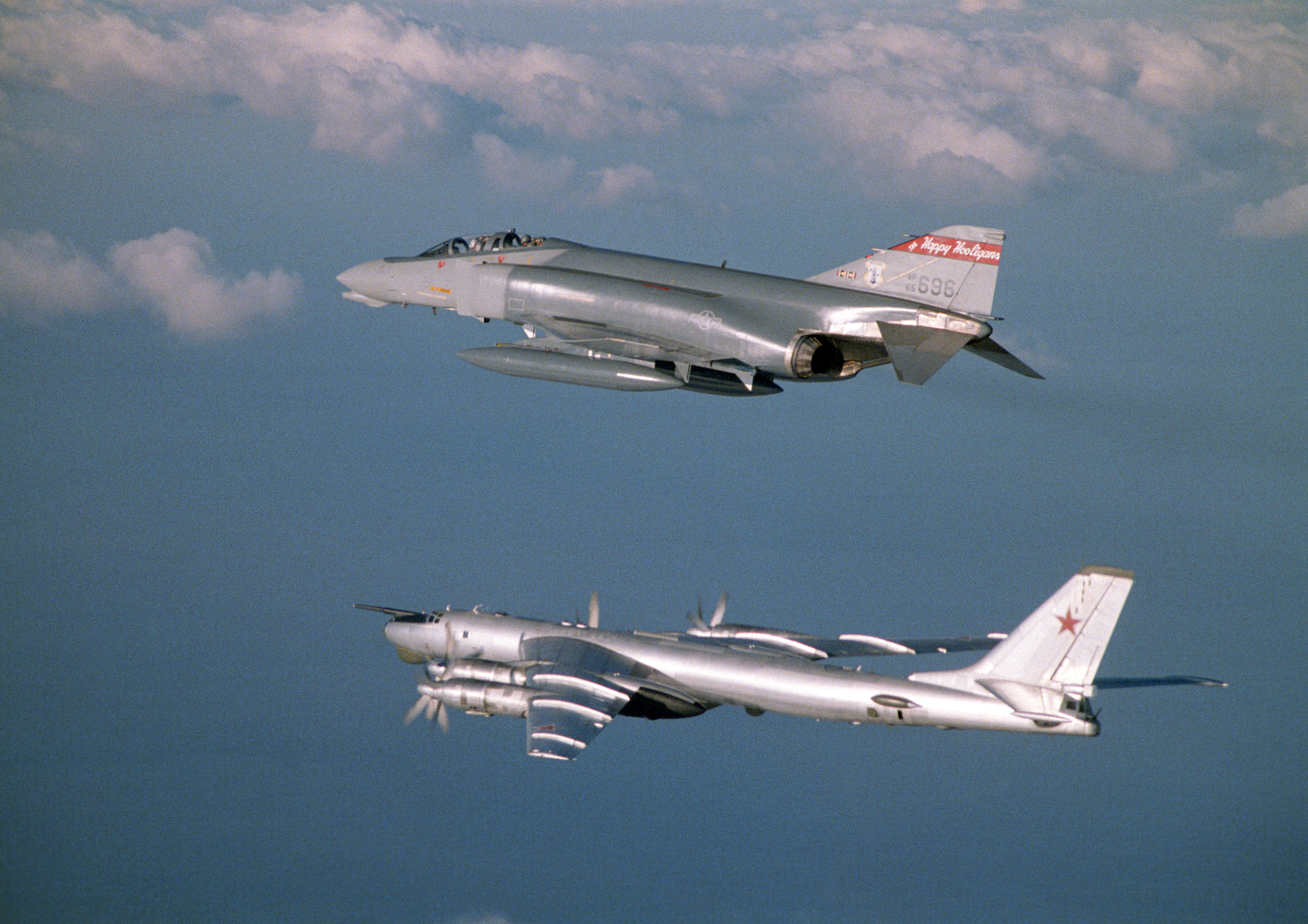
F-4D 119th FW inctercepting Tu-95 1983

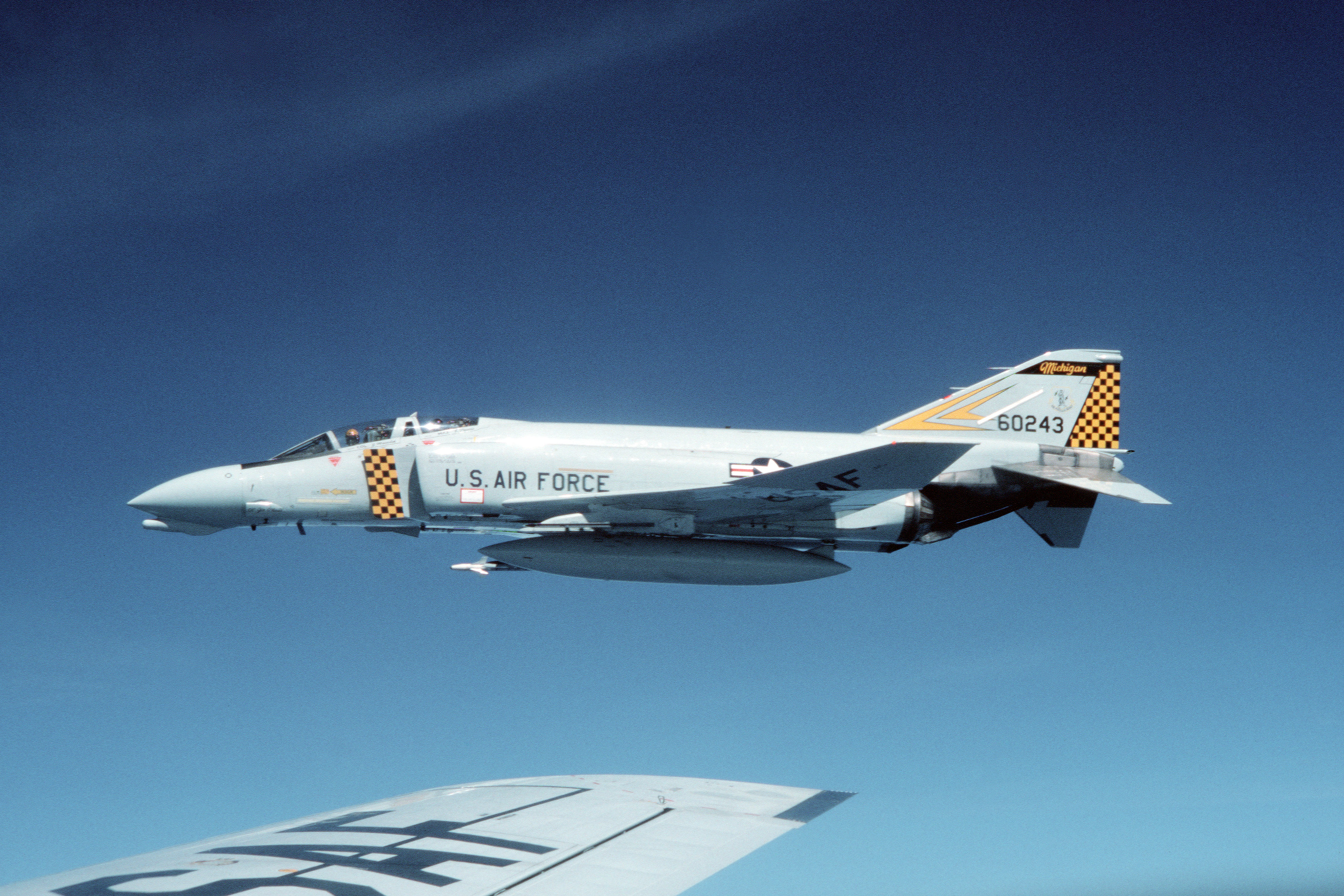
F-4D 171st FIS Michigan ANG in flight 1987

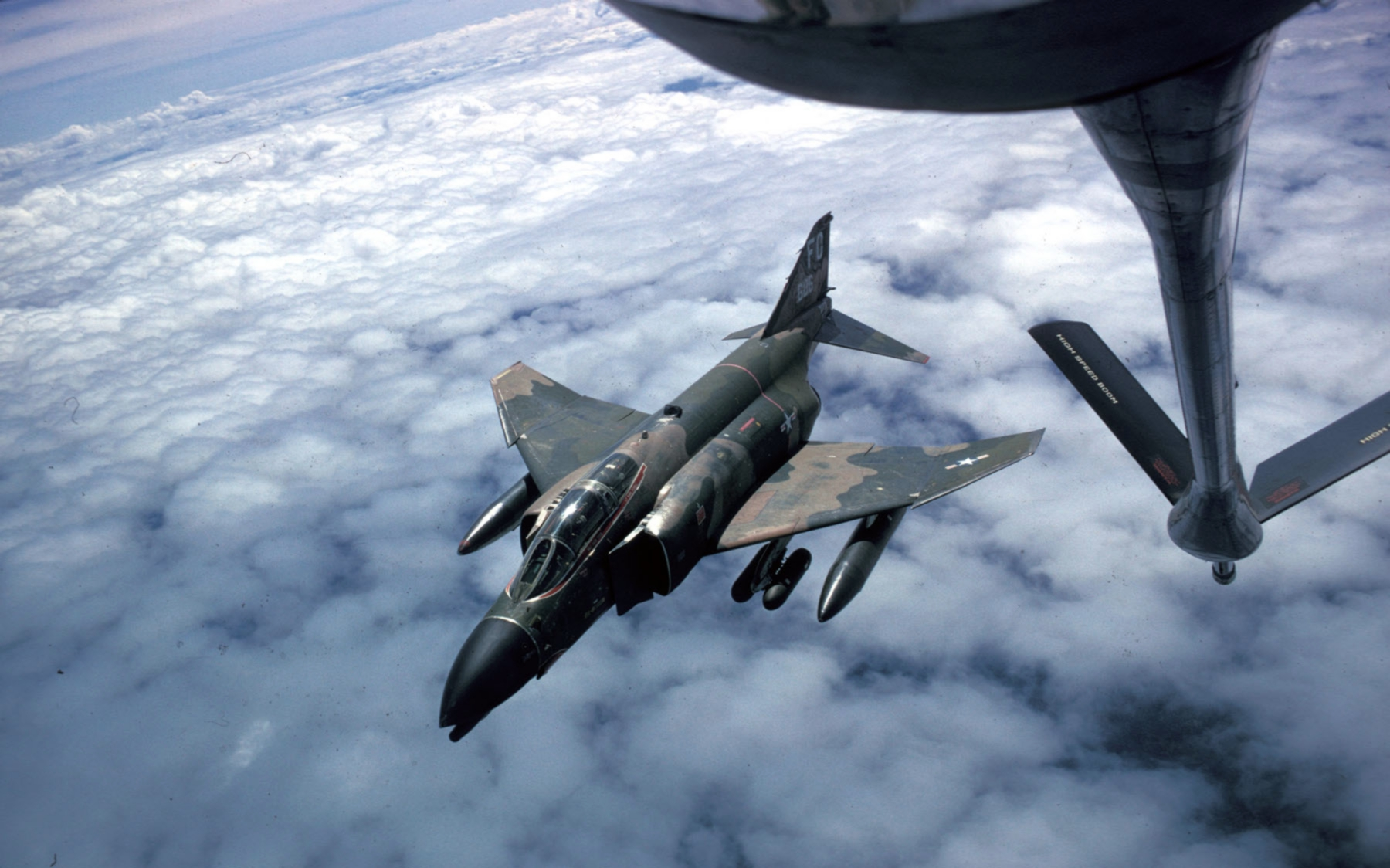
F-4D 435th TFS approaches tanker over Vietnam

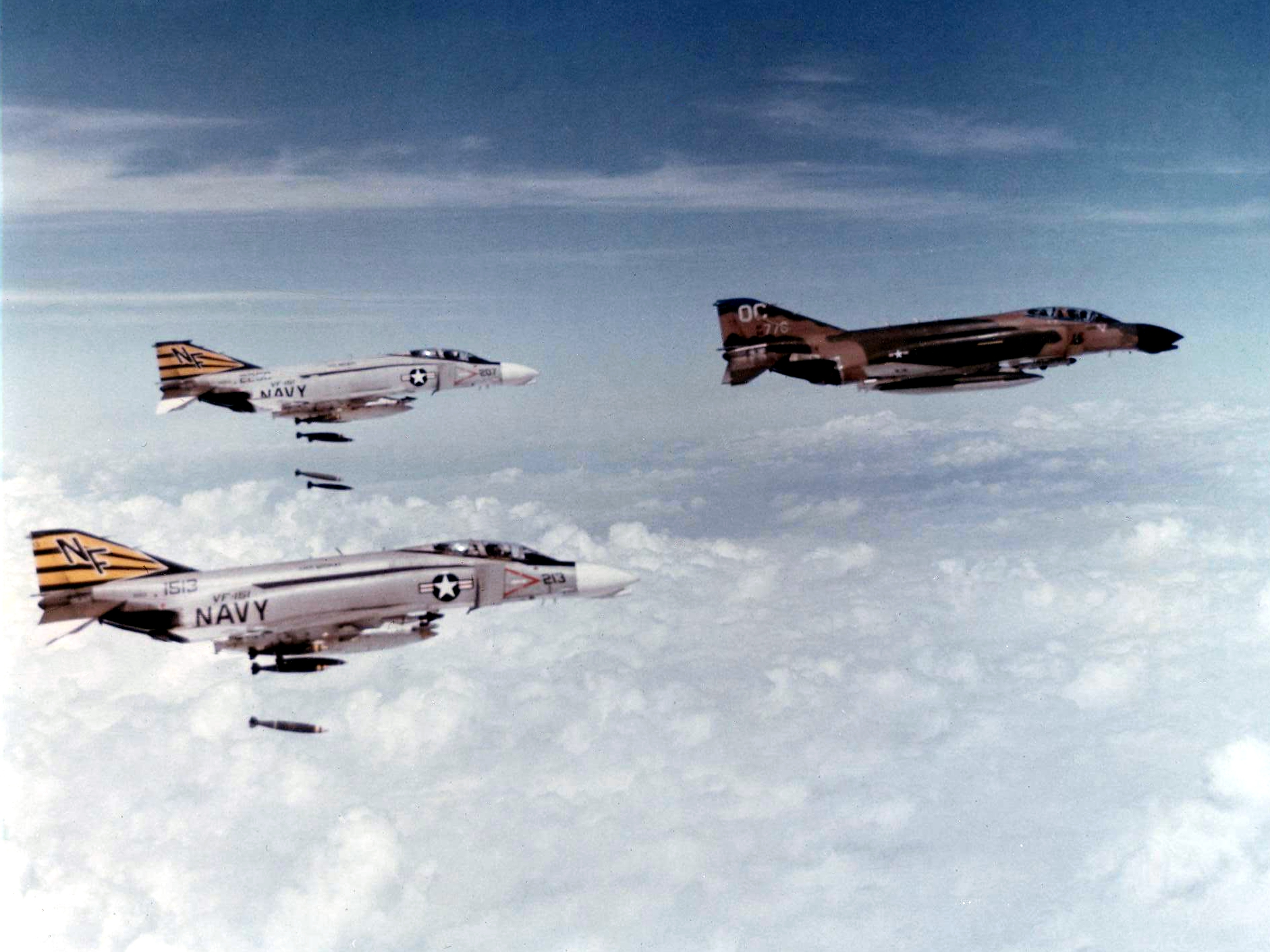
F-4D 13th TFS leads VF-151 F-4Bs on bombing mission 1971

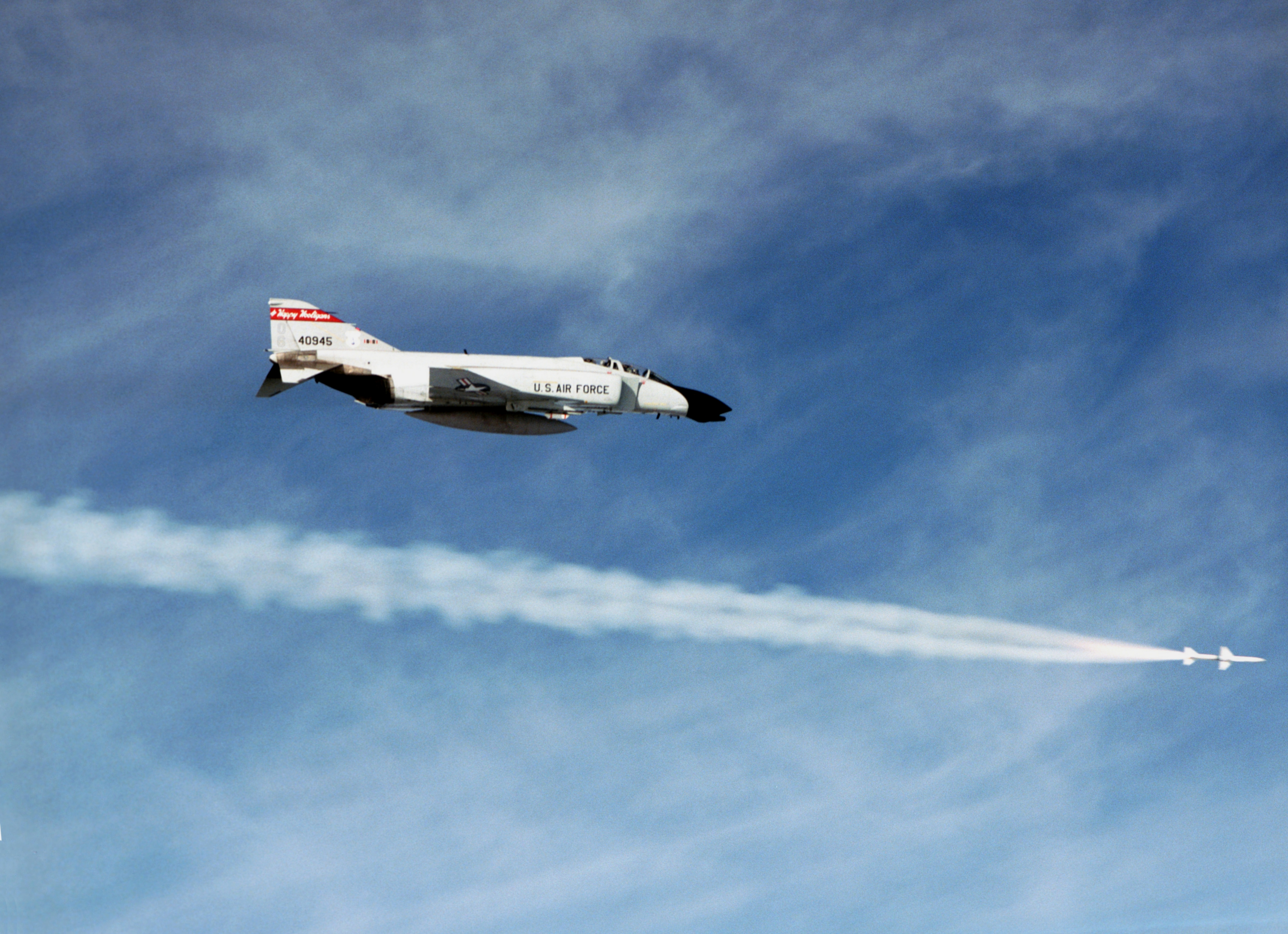
F-4D North Dakota ANG launches AIM-7 1983

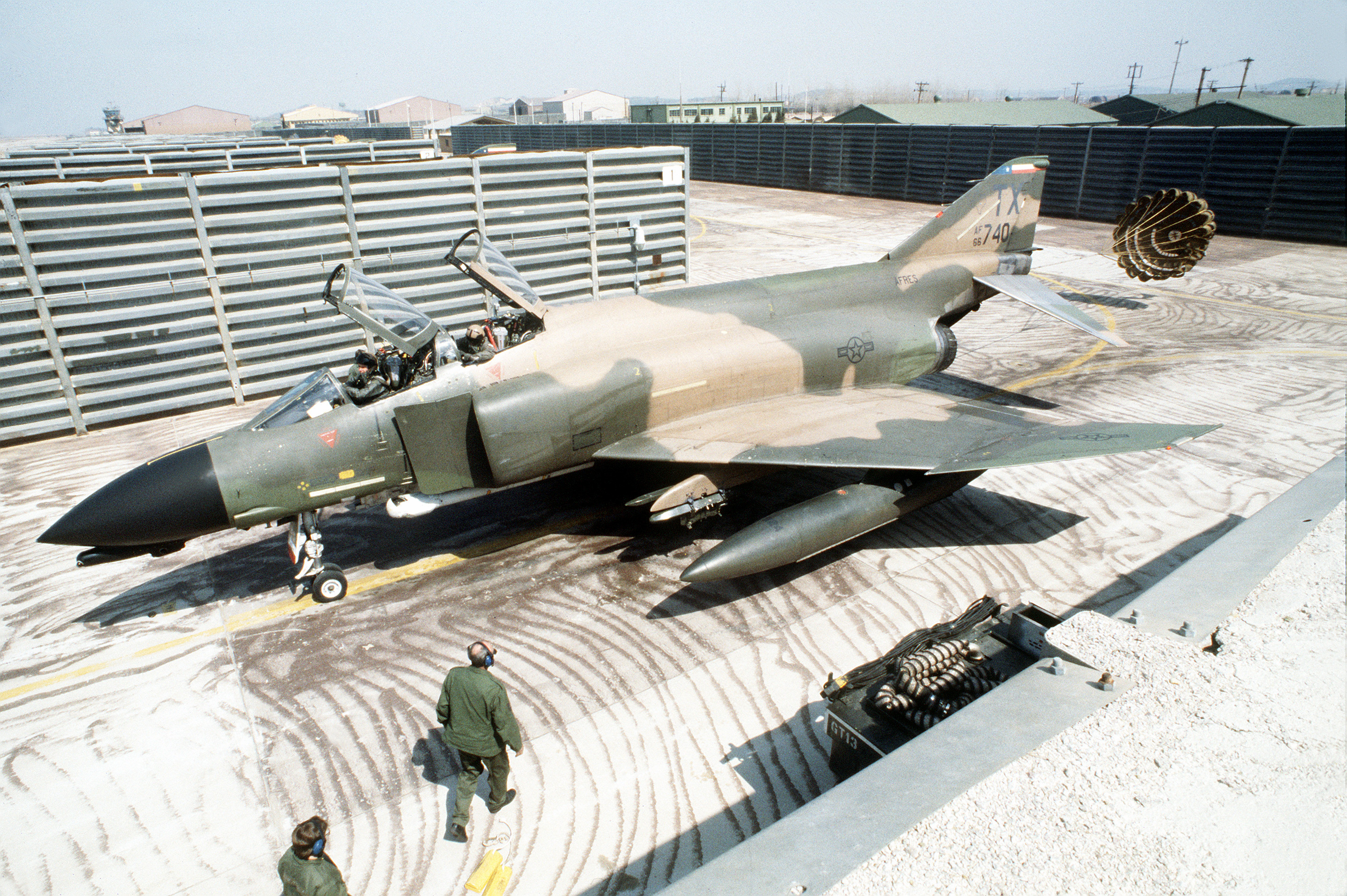
F-4D 924th TFW AFRES at Kunsan AB 1985

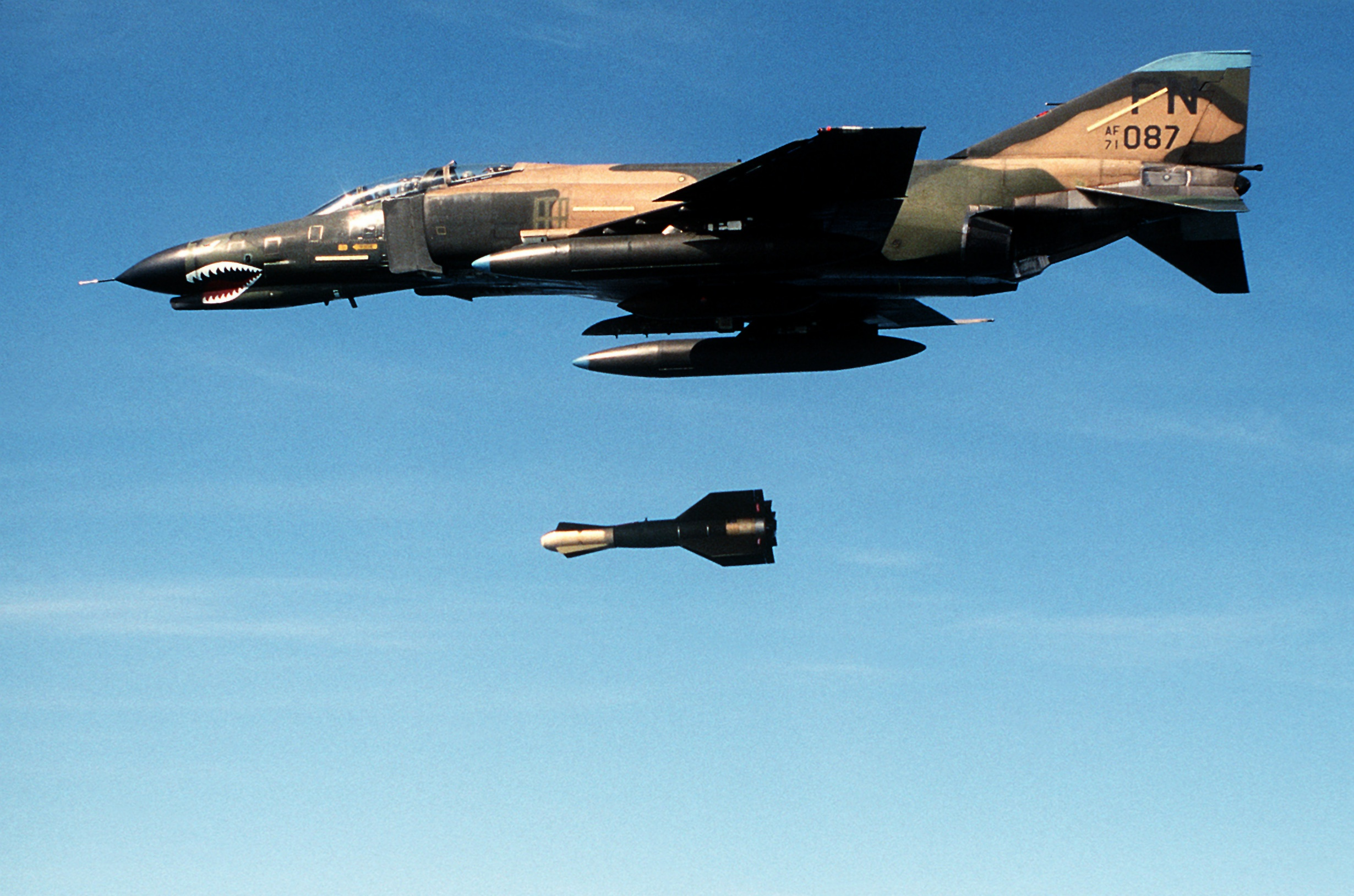
F-4E 3rd TFW dropping GBU-15 1985

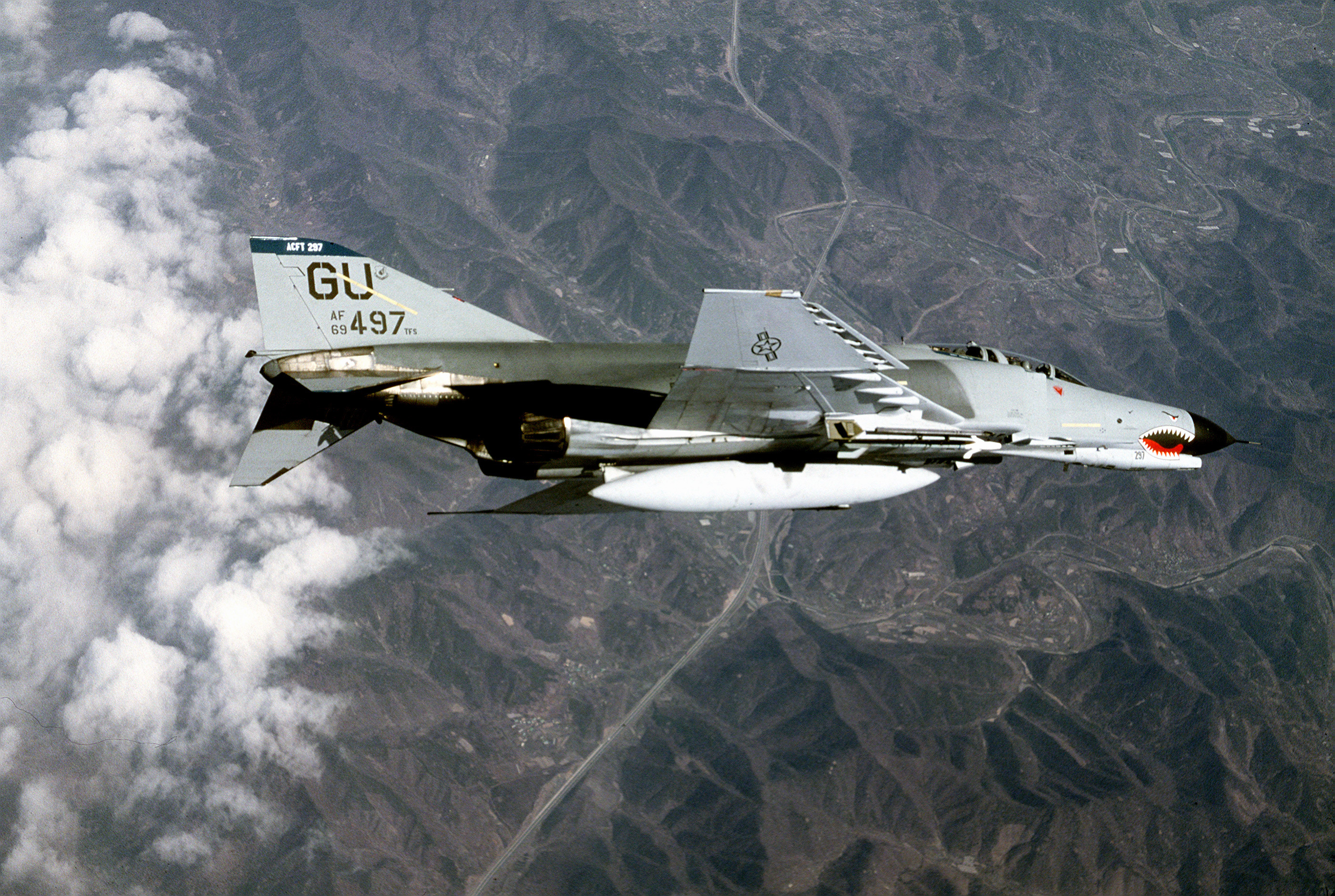
F-4E 497th TFS over Korea 1986

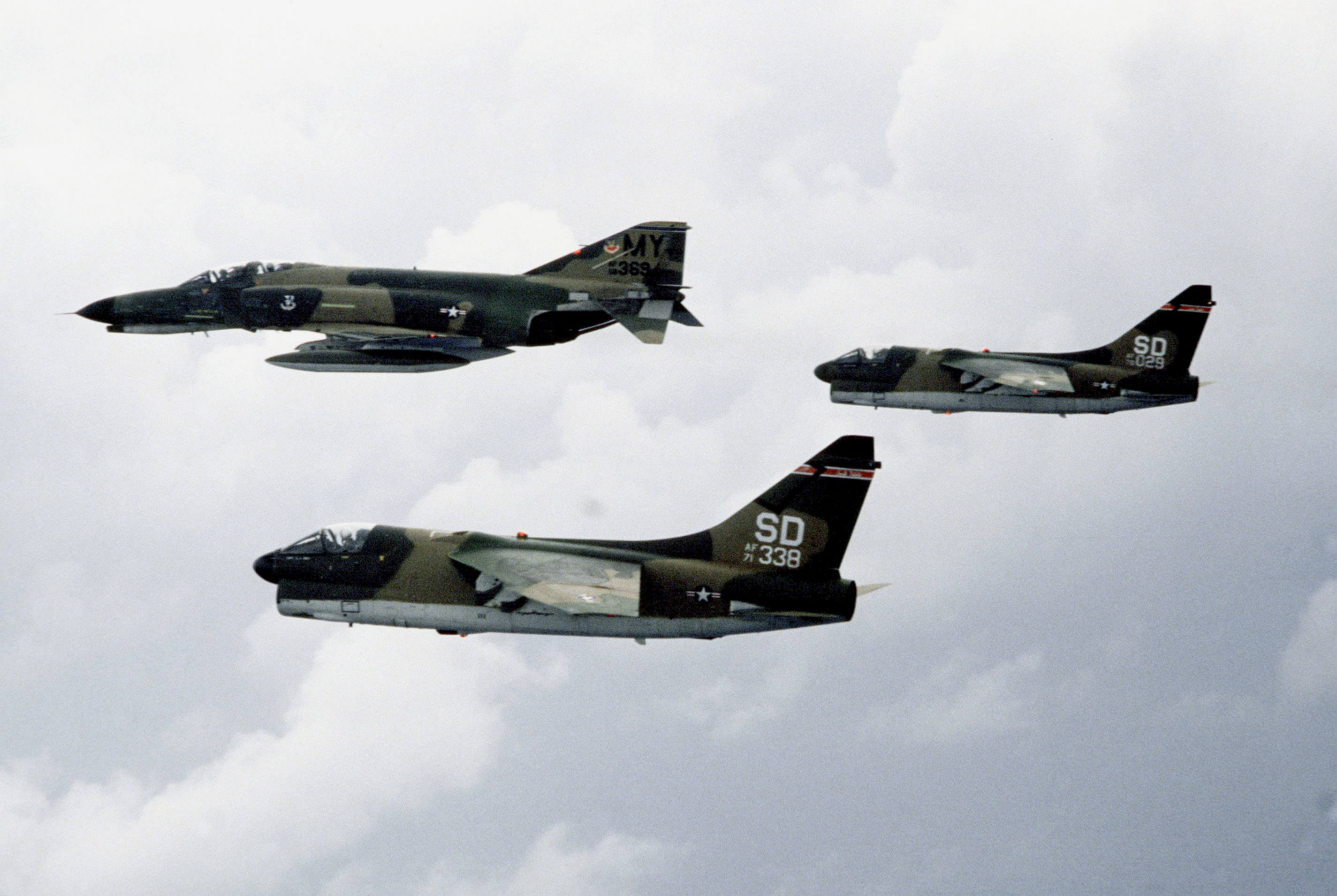
F-4E 347th TFW A-7Ds 114th TFG Panama 1979

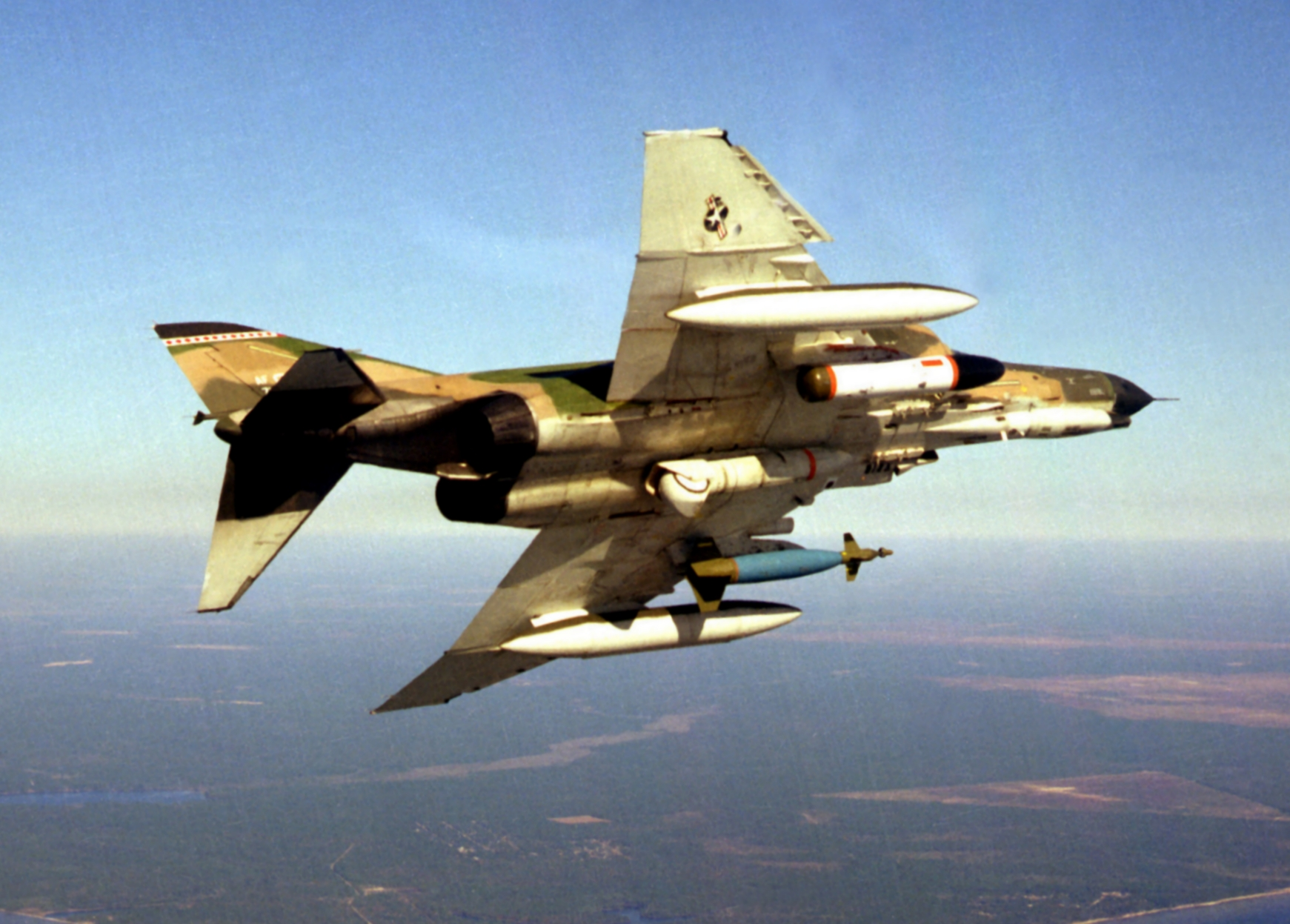
F-4E with Pave Tack near Eglin AFB 1976

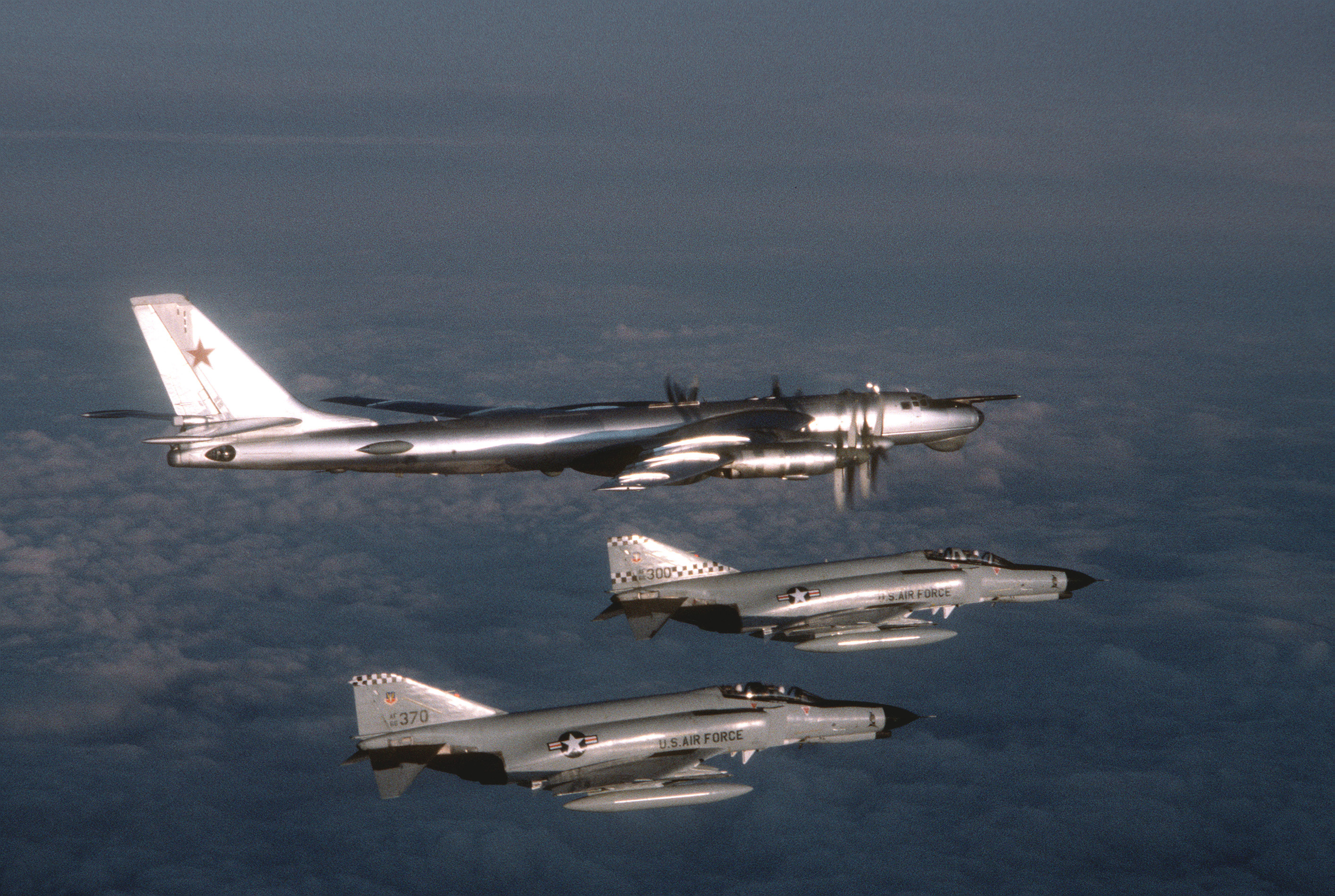
F-4Es 57FIS Tu95D 1980

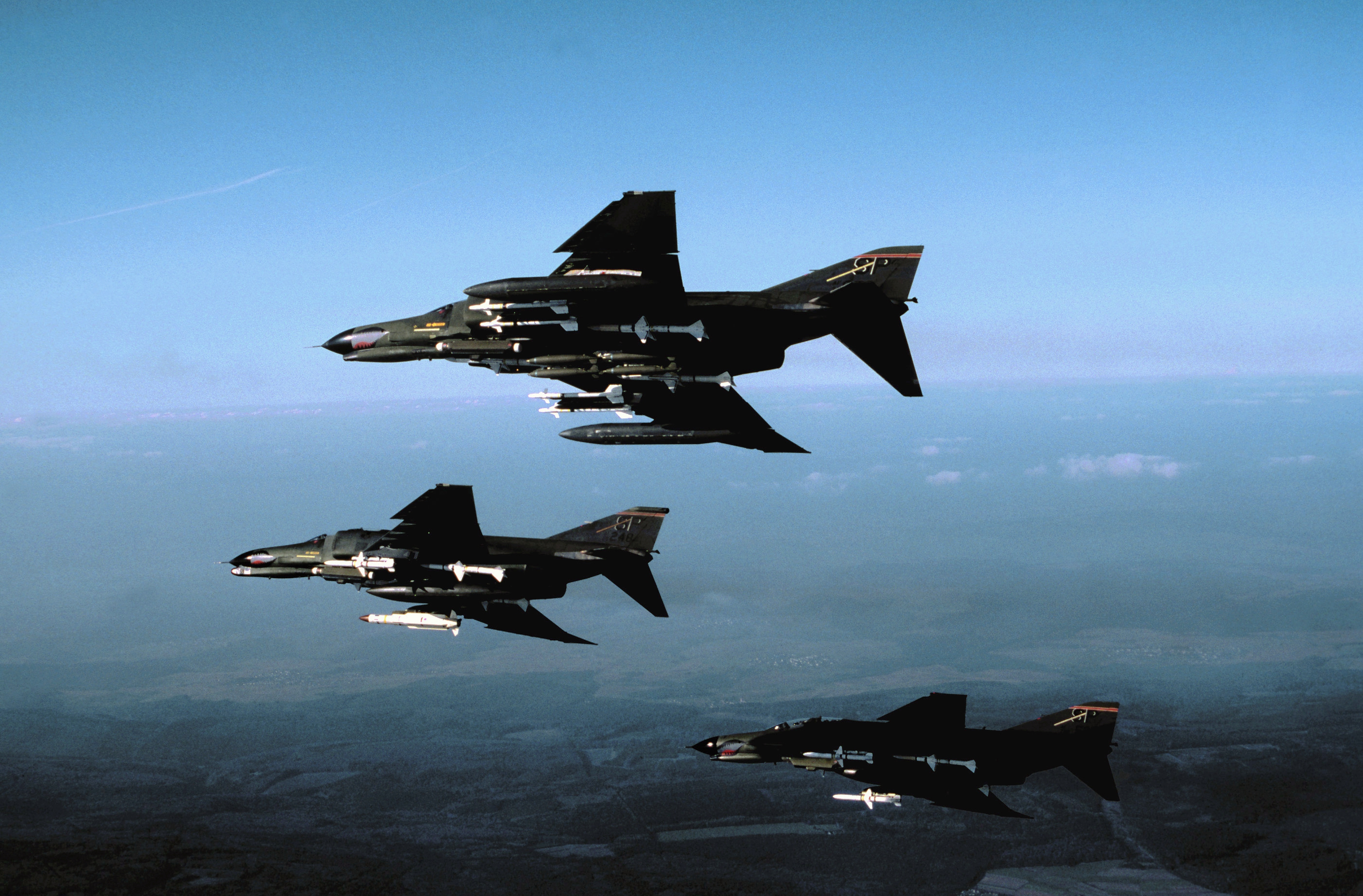
F-4G F-4Es 52TFW 1984

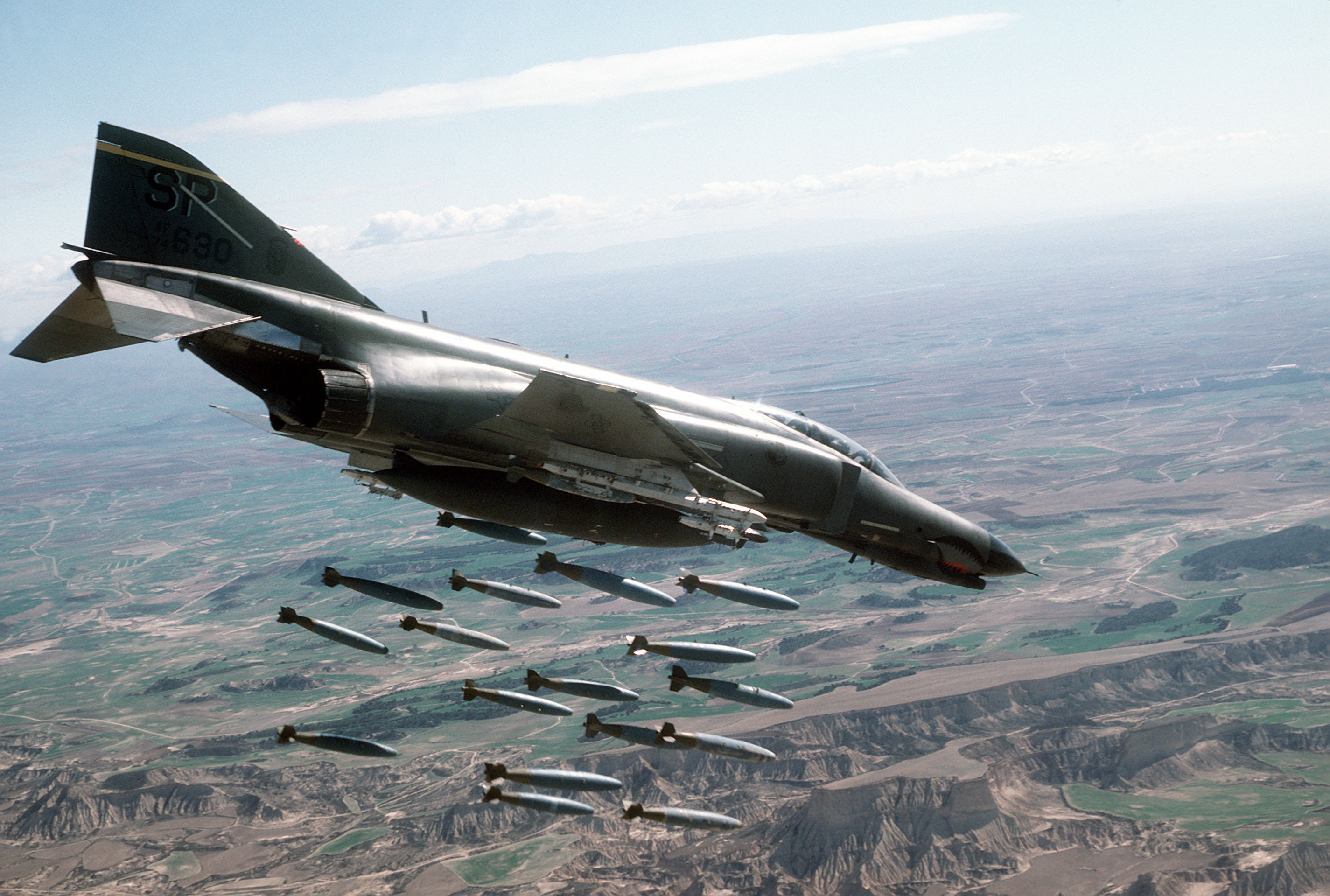
F-4E-81st-tfs

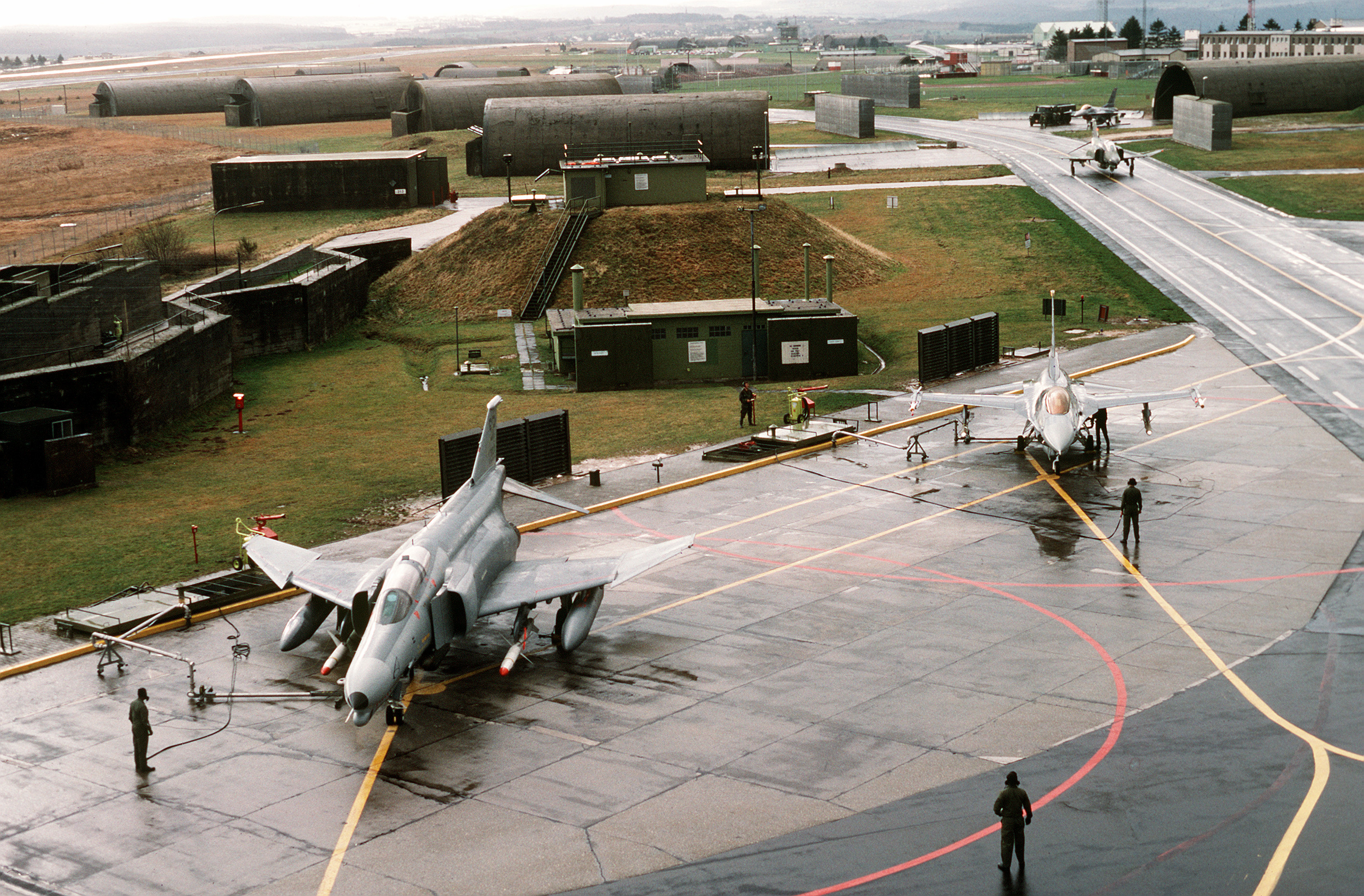
F-4G 81st TFS serviced at Spangdahlem 1990

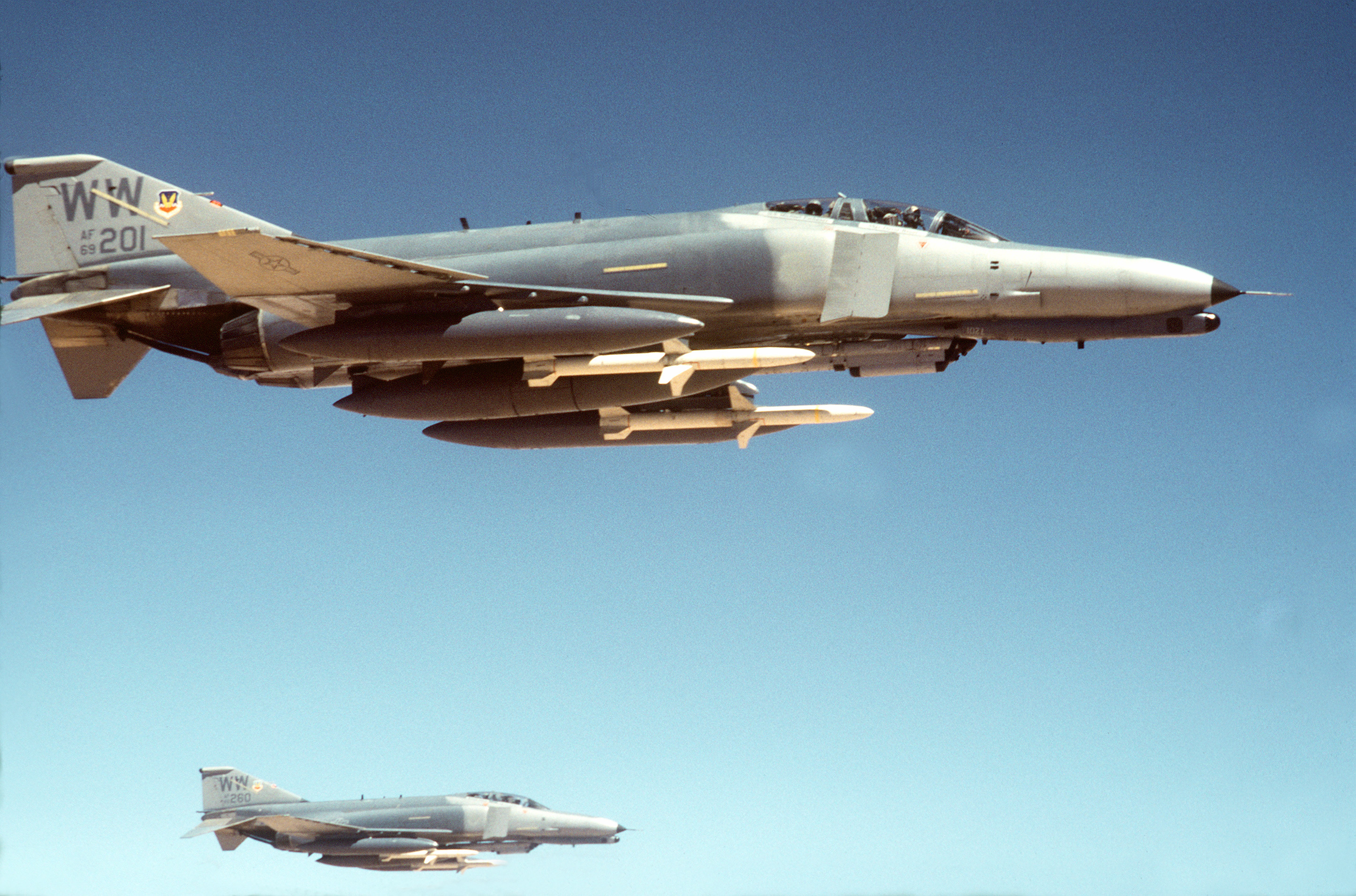
F-4Gs 35th TFW over Saudi desert 1991

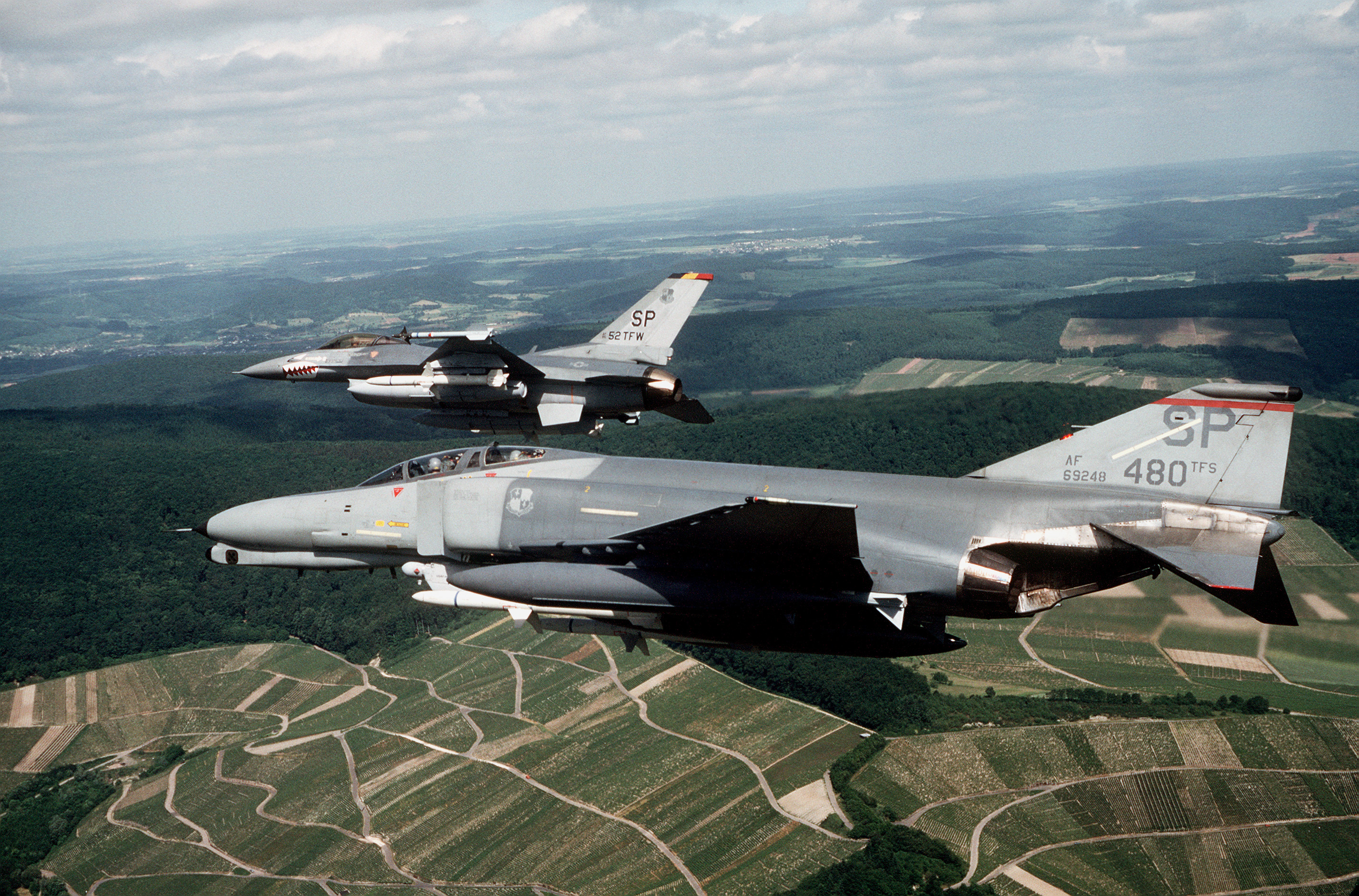
F-4G 480th TFS with F-16C 52nd TFW in flight 1989

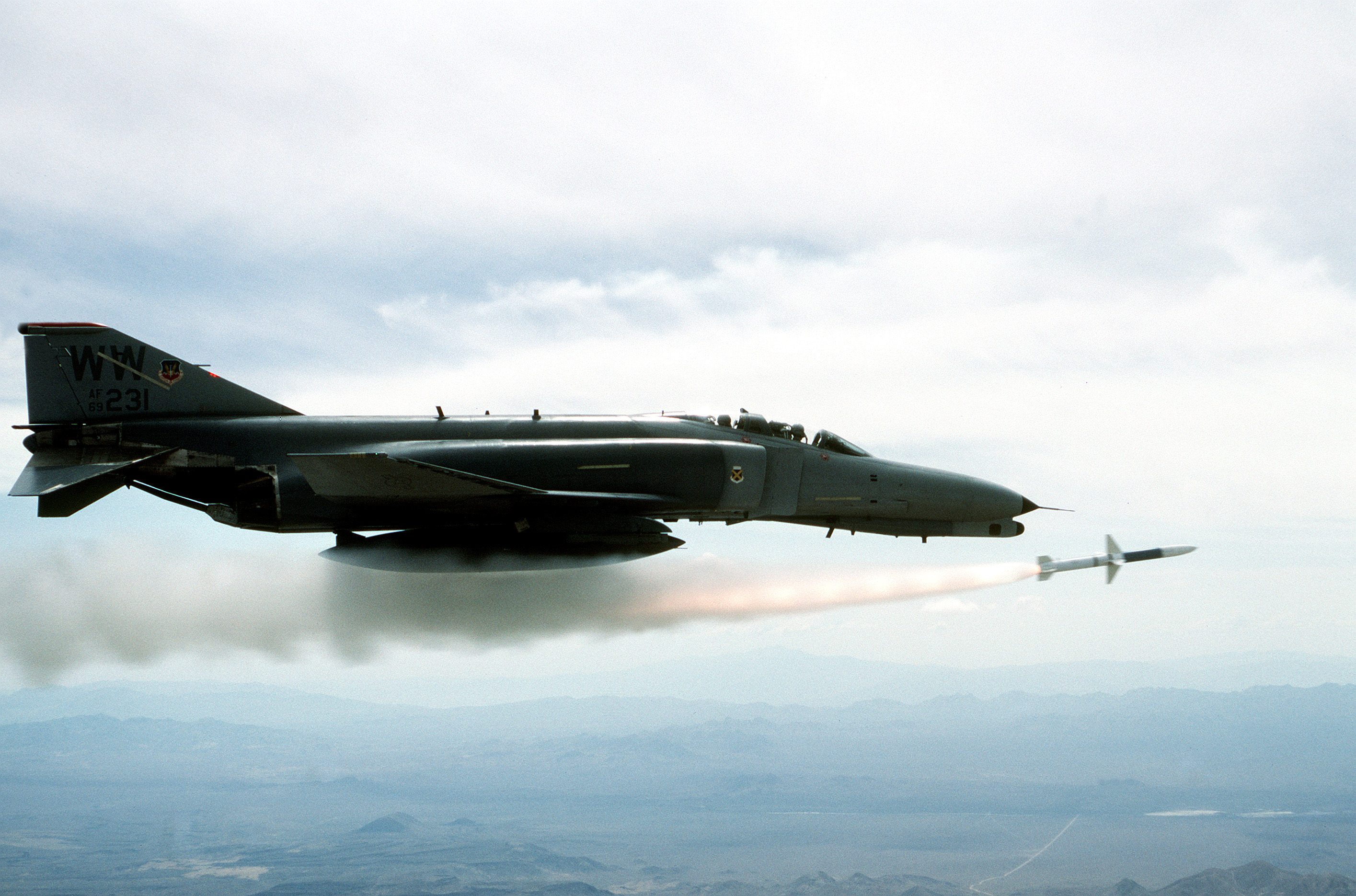
F-4E Phantom launches AGM-45

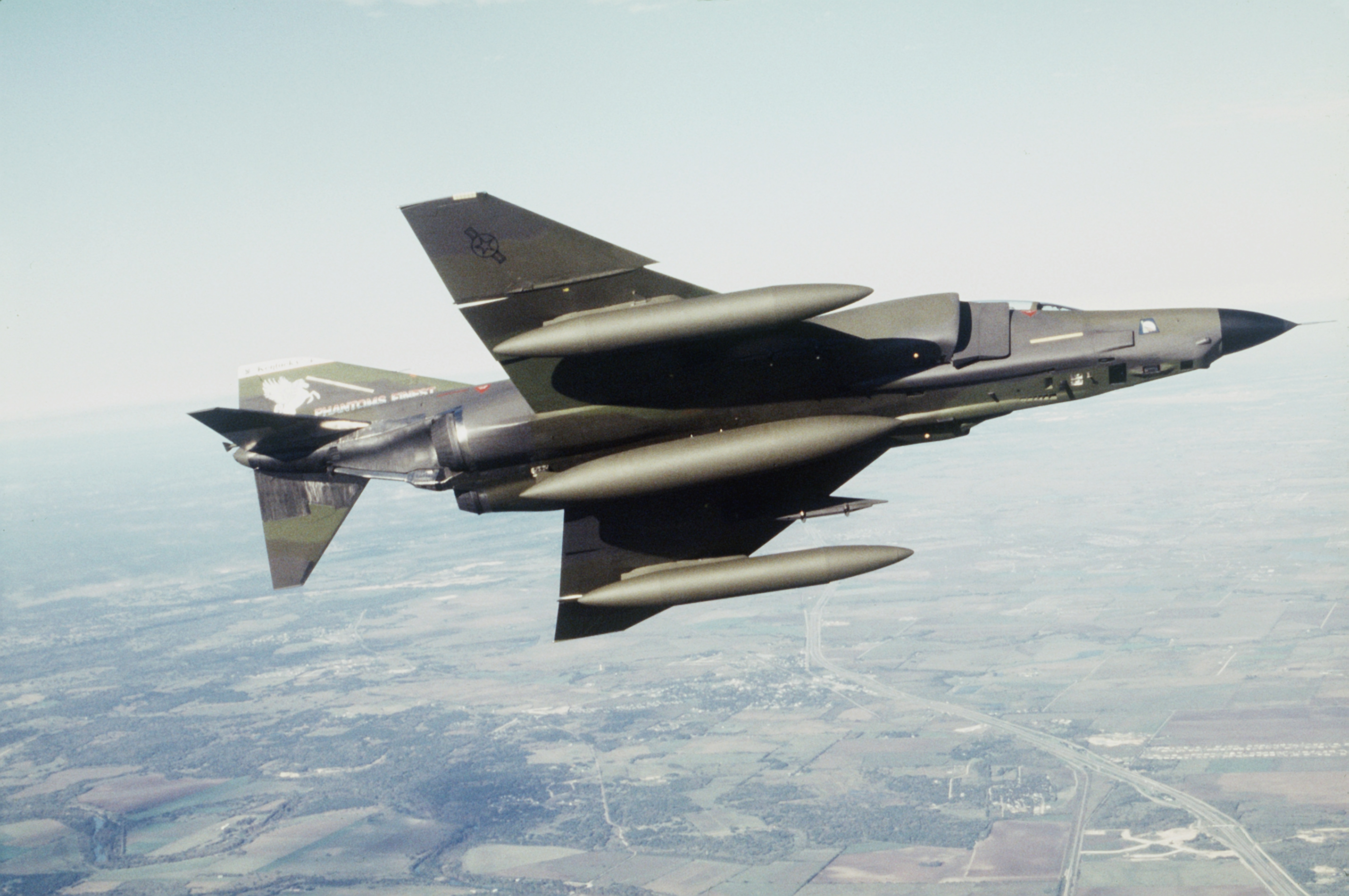
RF-4C Kentucky ANG from below 1986

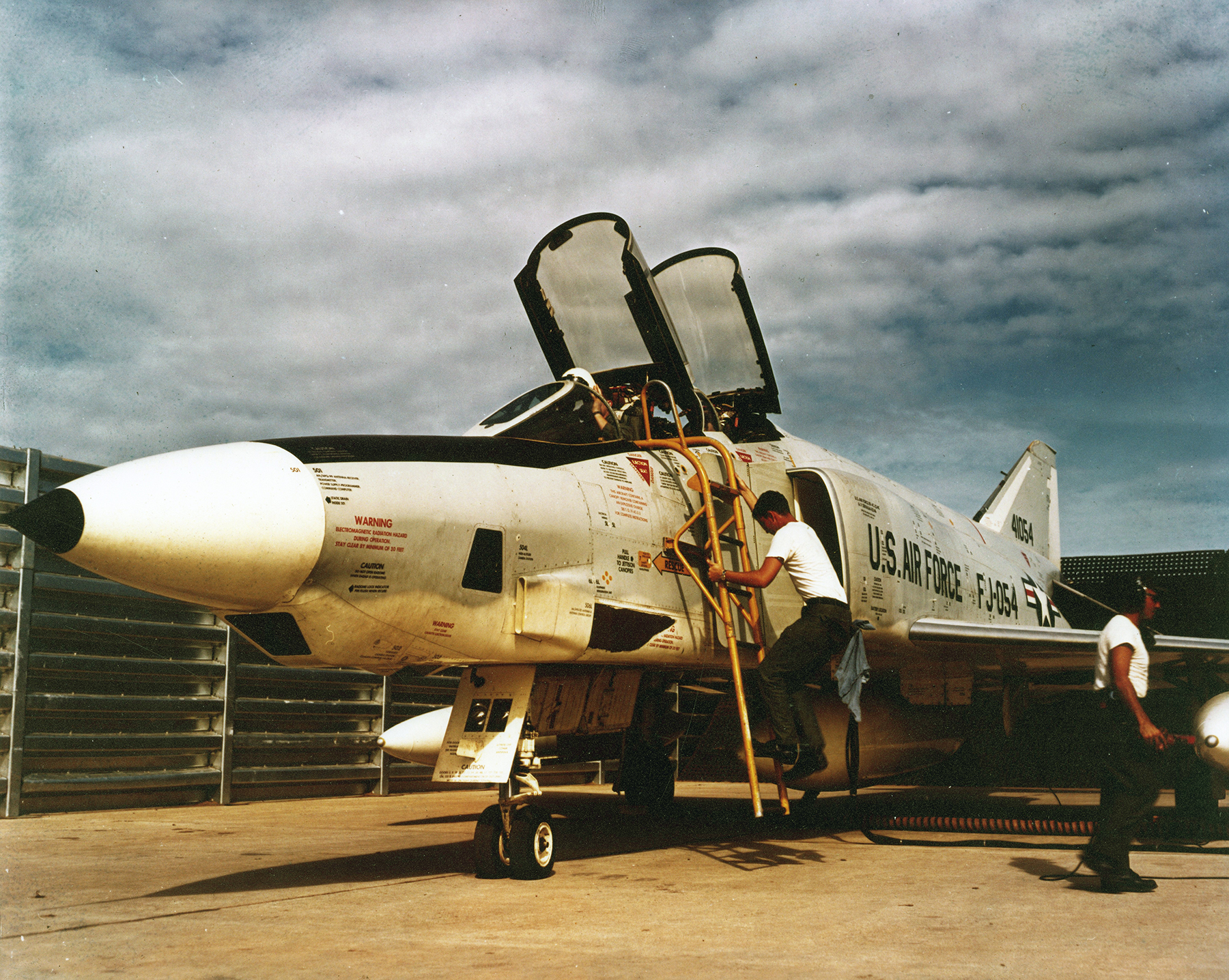
RF-4C Phantom 16th TRS in Vietnam c1965

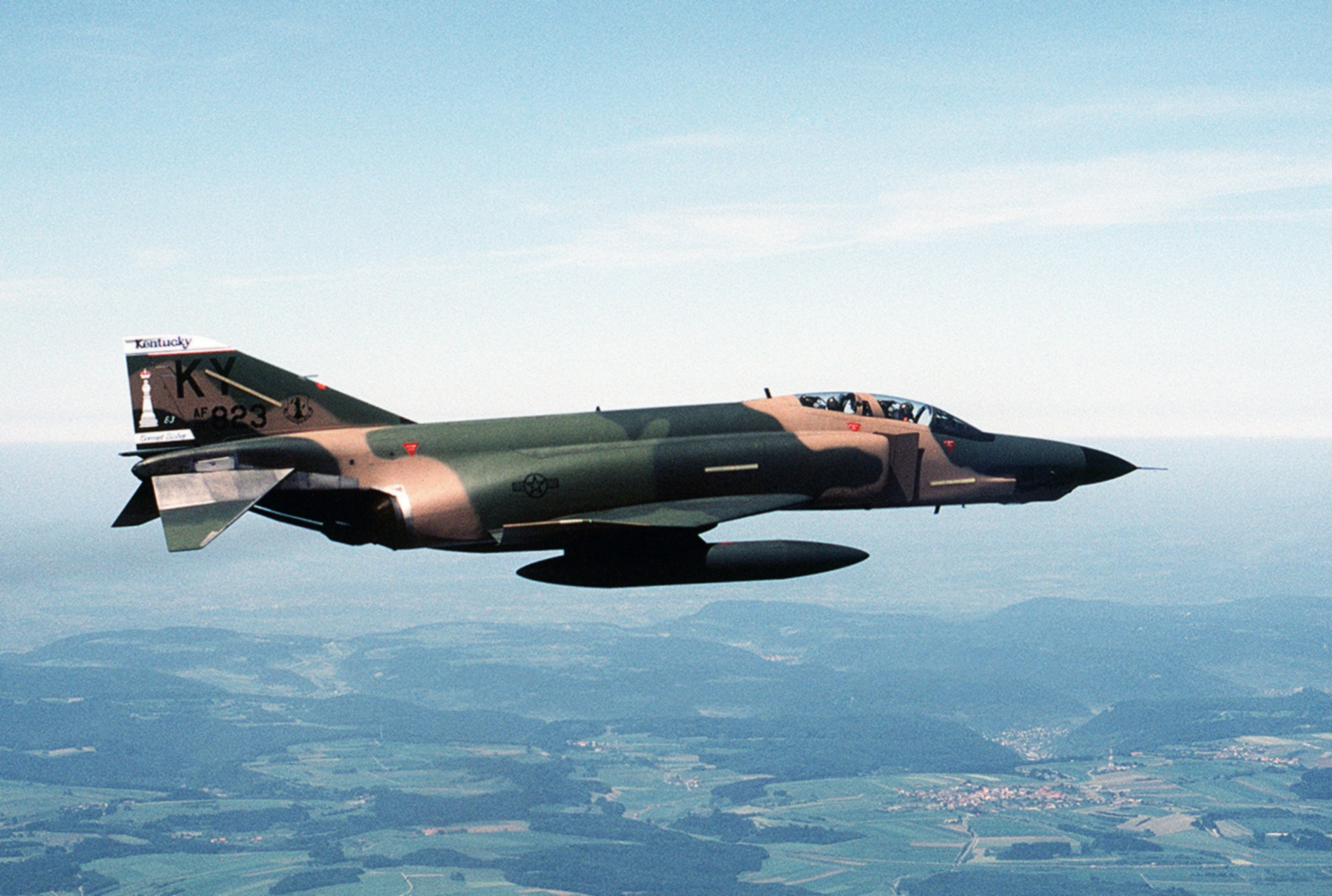
RF-4C Kentucky ANG over Germany 1983

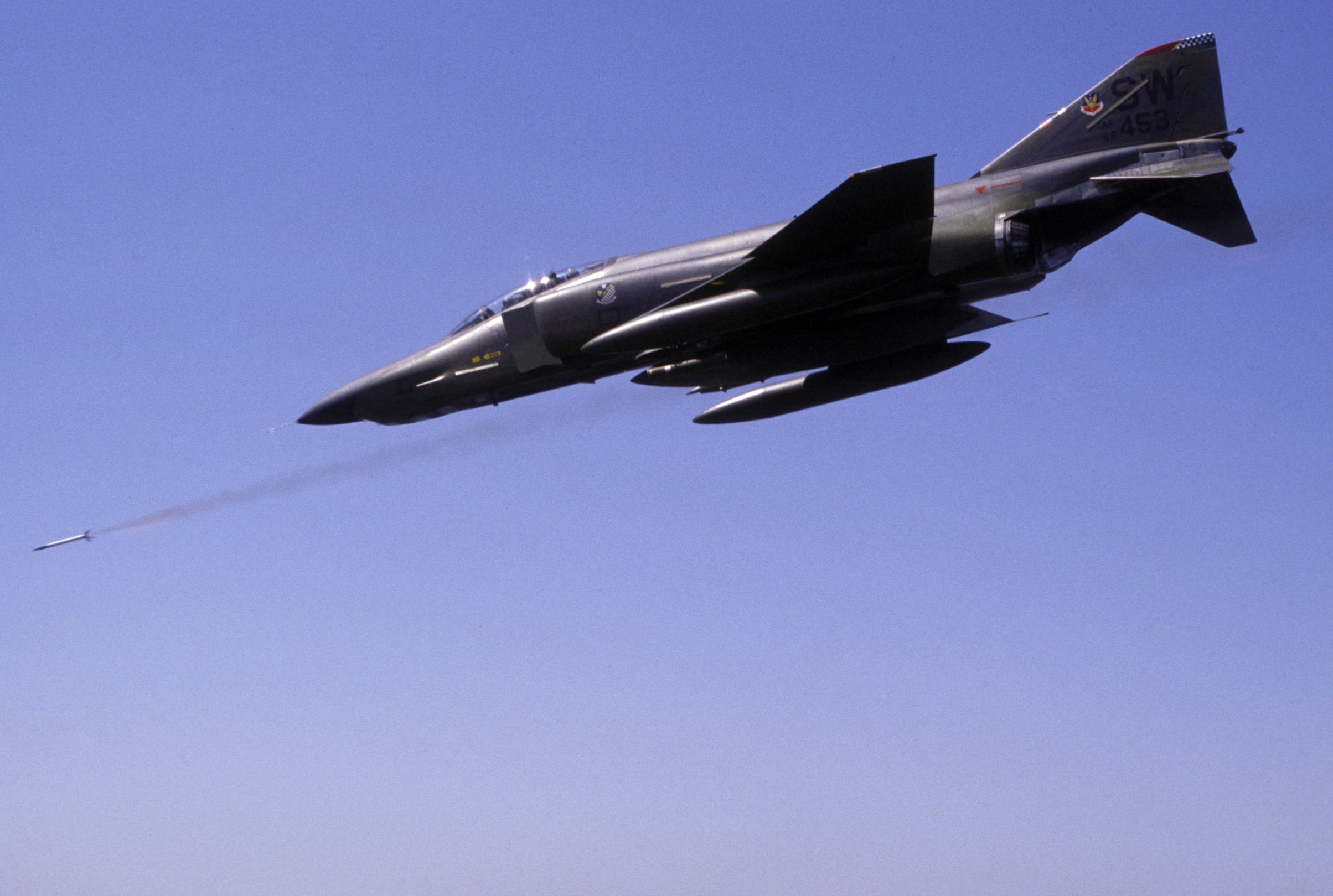
RF-4C Phantom firing rocket

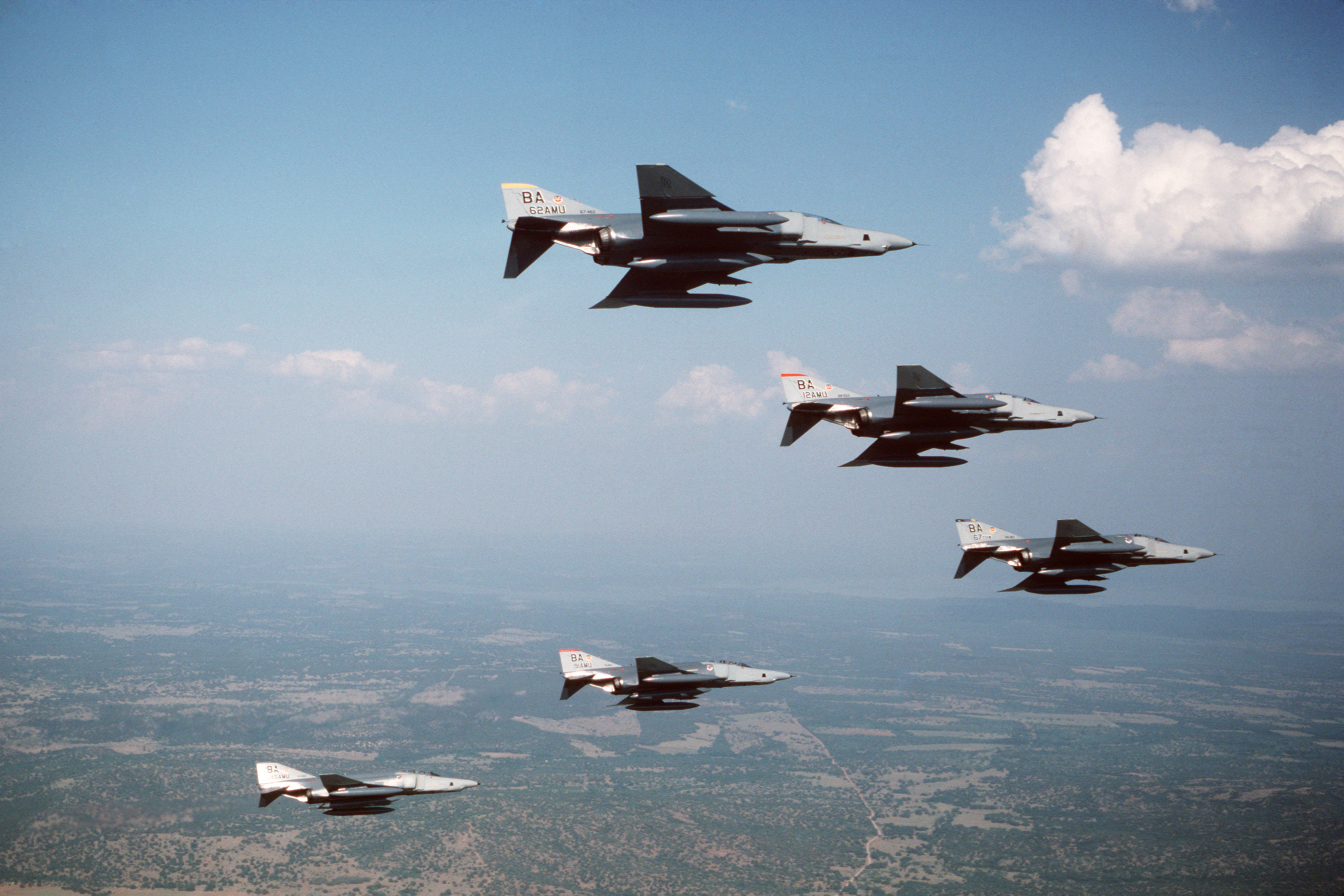
RF-4Cs 67th TRW in flight 1988

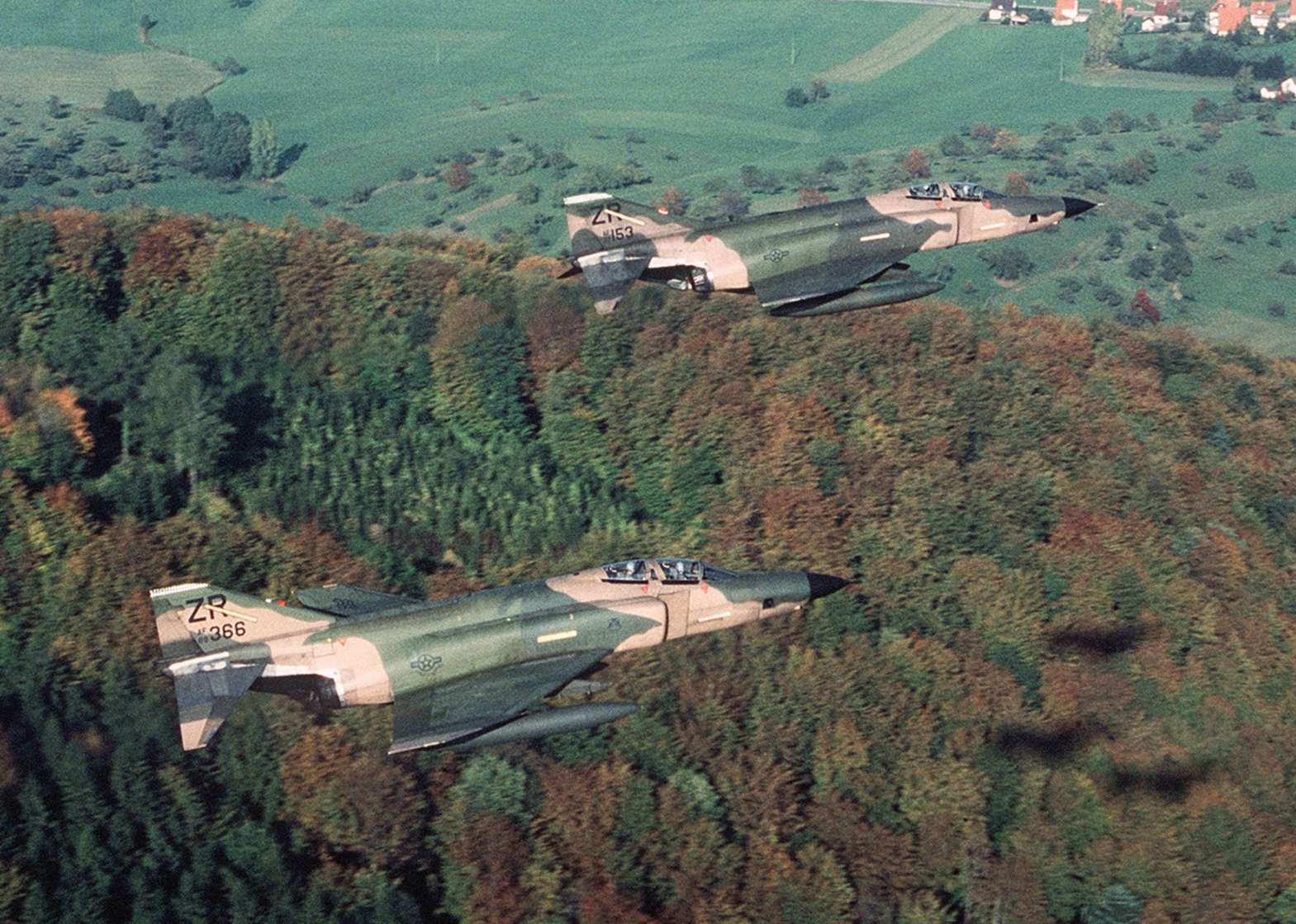
RF-4Cs 26th TRW over Germany c1985

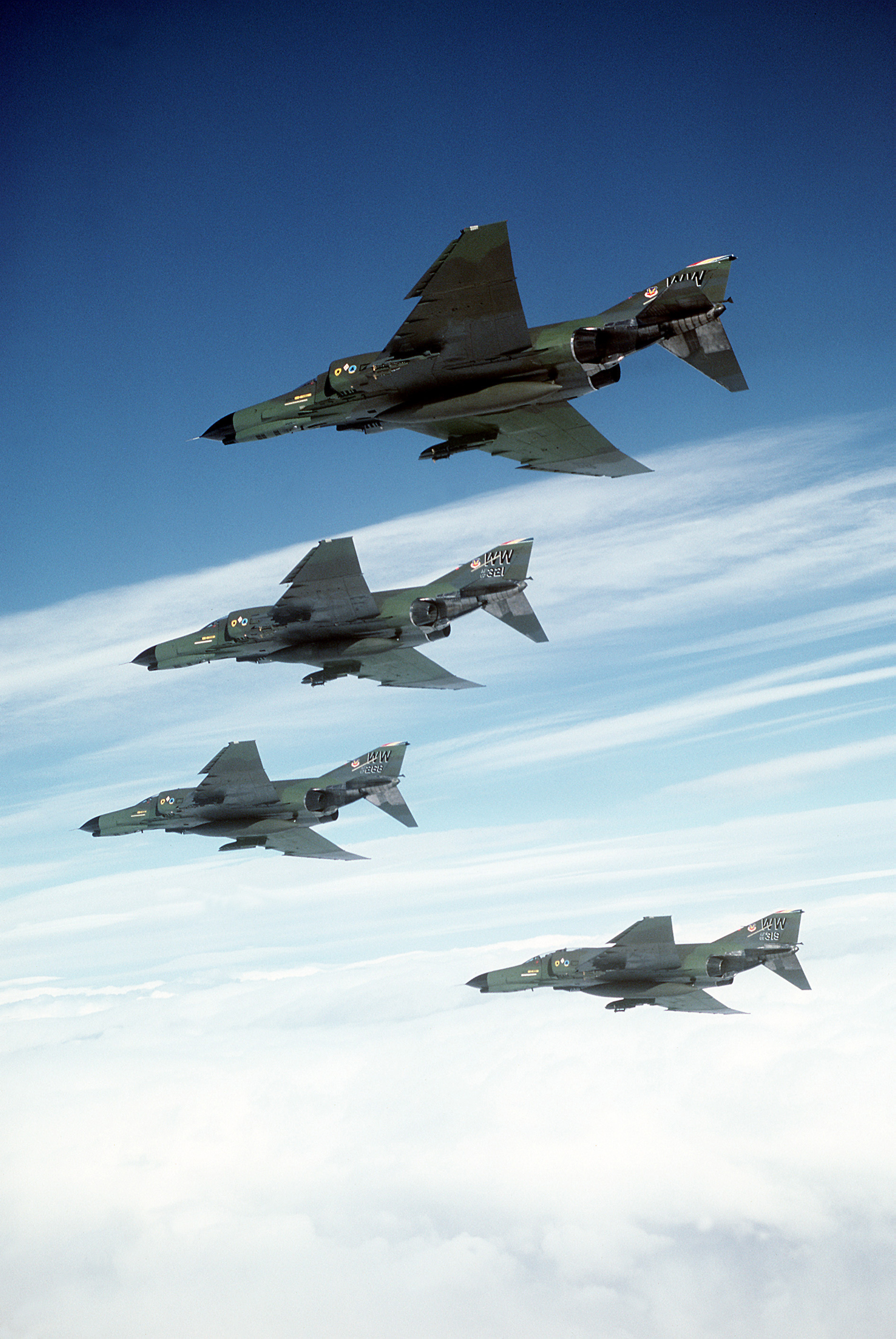
An air-to-air left underside view of four 37th Tactical Fighter Wing F-4E Phantom II aircraft in formation during the Tactical Air Command bombing and gunnery competition Gunsmoke '85 DF-ST-87-03762

List of units:

Active Duty

Tactical Air Command

United States Air Force Thunderbirds F-4E - Nellis AFB, Nevada (1969-1974)
1st Tactical Fighter Wing - MacDill AFB, Florida

27th Tactical Fighter Squadron F-4E (1971-1975)
71st Tactical Fighter Squadron F-4E (1971-1975)
94th Tactical Fighter Squadron F-4E (1971-1975)

4th Tactical Fighter Wing - Seymour Johnson AFB, North Carolina

334th Tactical Fighter Squadron F-4D (1967-1970) F-4E (1970-1991)
335th Tactical Fighter Squadron F-4D (1967-1970) F-4E (1970-1990)
336th Tactical Fighter Squadron F-4D (1967-1970) F-4E (1970-1990)
337th Tactical Fighter Squadron F-4E (1985-1987)

15th Tactical Fighter Wing - MacDill AFB, Florida

43d Tactical Fighter Squadron F-4C (1964-1970) F-4E (1970-1982)
45th Tactical Fighter Squadron F-4C (1964-1971)
46th Tactical Fighter Squadron F-4C (1964-1971)
47th Tactical Fighter Squadron F-4C (1964-1971)

31st Tactical Fighter Wing - Homestead AFB, Florida

306th Tactical Fighter Squadron F-4E (1970-1988)
307th Tactical Fighter Squadron F-4E (1970-1988)
308th Tactical Fighter Squadron F-4E (1970-1986)
309th Tactical Fighter Squadron F-4E (1970-1986)

33d Tactical Fighter Wing - Eglin AFB, Florida

40th Tactical Fighter Squadron F-4D (1965-1967)
58th Tactical Fighter Squadron F-4E (1970-1979)
59th Tactical Fighter Squadron F-4E (1973-1979)

35th Tactical Fighter Wing - George AFB, California

20th Tactical Fighter Training Squadron F-4F (1973-1978) F-4E (1972-1992)
21st Tactical Fighter Training Squadron F-4C (1972-1980) F-4E (Black 1980-1992)
39th Tactical Fighter Squadron F-4E (White 1977-1980, Gold 1982–1984)
431st Tactical Fighter Squadron F-4E (1972-1976)
434th Tactical Fighter Squadron F-4C (1967-1972) F-4E (1972-1976)

37th Tactical Fighter Wing - George AFB, California

561st Tactical Fighter Squadron F-4E/G (Yellow 1980-1992)
562d Tactical Fighter Squadron F-4E/G (Blue 1972-1992)
563d Tactical Fighter Squadron F-4E/G (Red 1975-1989)

49th Tactical Fighter Wing - Holloman AFB, New Mexico

7th Tactical Fighter Squadron F-4D (1968-1977)
8th Tactical Fighter Squadron F-4D (1968-1977)
9th Tactical Fighter Squadron F-4D (1968-1977)
20th Fighter Squadron F-4F (1993-2004)

56th Tactical Fighter Wing - MacDill AFB, Florida

13th Tactical Fighter Squadron F-4D (1975-1982)
61st Tactical Fighter Squadron F-4D (1975-1980)
62d Tactical Fighter Squadron F-4D (1975-1981)
63d Tactical Fighter Squadron F-4D (1975-1981)

57th Fighter Weapons Wing - Nellis AFB, Nevada

414th Fighter Weapons Squadron F-4C/D/E (1969-1986)

58th Tactical Fighter Training Wing - Luke AFB, Arizona

426th Tactical Fighter Training Squadron F-4
550th Tactical Fighter Training Squadron F-4

67th Tactical Reconnaissance Wing - Bergstrom AFB, Texas

7th Tactical Reconnaissance Squadron RF-4C (1967-1971)
10th Tactical Reconnaissance Squadron RF-4C (1966-1971)
22d Tactical Reconnaissance Squadron RF-4C (1966-1971)

75th Tactical Reconnaissance Wing - Bergstrom AFB, Texas
347th Tactical Fighter Wing - Moody AFB, Georgia

68th Tactical Fighter Squadron F-4E (1973-1987)
69th Tactical Fighter Squadron F-4E (1983-1988)
70th Tactical Fighter Squadron F-4E (1975-1987)

388th Tactical Fighter Wing - Hill AFB, Utah

4th Tactical Fighter Squadron F-4D (1976-1979)
34th Tactical Fighter Squadron F-4D (1976-1979)
421st Tactical Fighter Squadron F-4D (1976-1979)

474th Tactical Fighter Wing - Nellis AFB, Nevada

428th Tactical Fighter Squadron F-4D (1977-1980)
429th Tactical Fighter Squadron F-4D (1977-1980)
430th Tactical Fighter Squadron F-4D (1977-1980)

United States Air Forces in Europe

32d Tactical Fighter Squadron - Soesterberg AB, Netherlands F-4E (1969-1979)

57th Fighter-Interceptor Squadron - NAS Keflavik, Iceland F-4C (1975–1978) F-4E (1978-1985)

10th Tactical Reconnaissance Wing - RAF Alconbury, United Kingdom

1st Tactical Reconnaissance Squadron RF-4C (1966-1988)
30th Tactical Reconnaissance Squadron RF-4C (1966-1976)
32d Tactical Reconnaissance Squadron RF-4C (1966-1976)

26th Tactical Reconnaissance Wing - Zweibrücken AB, Germany

17th Tactical Reconnaissance Squadron RF-4C (1969-1978)
38th Tactical Reconnaissance Squadron RF-4C (1965-1991)

36th Tactical Fighter Wing - Bitburg AB, Germany

22d Tactical Fighter Squadron F-4D (1966-1973) F-4E (1973-1977)
53d Tactical Fighter Squadron F-4D (1966-1973) F-4E (1973-1977)
525th Tactical Fighter Squadron F-4D (1966-1973) F-4E (1973-1977)

48th Tactical Fighter Wing – RAF Lakenheath, United Kingdom

492d Tactical Fighter Squadron F-4D (1972-1977)
493d Tactical Fighter Squadron F-4D (1972-1977)
494th Tactical Fighter Squadron F-4D (1972-1977)

50th Tactical Fighter Wing - Hahn AB, Germany

10th Tactical Fighter Squadron F-4D (1966-1976) F-4E (1976-1982)
313th Tactical Fighter Squadron F-4E (1976-1981)
496th Tactical Fighter Squadron F-4E (1970-1982)

52d Tactical Fighter Wing - Spangdahlem AB, Germany

23d Tactical Fighter Squadron F-4E (Blue 1981-1987) F-4G (Blue 1983-1991)
81st Tactical Fighter Squadron F-4E (Yellow 1983-1986) F-4G (Yellow 1979-1994)
480th Tactical Fighter Squadron F-4E/G (Red 1972-1987)

81st Tactical Fighter Wing - RAF Bentwaters/Woodbridge, United Kingdom

78th Tactical Fighter Squadron F-4C (1965-1972) F-4D (1972-1979)
91st Tactical Fighter Squadron F-4C (1965-1972) F-4D (1972-1979)
92d Tactical Fighter Squadron F-4C (1965-1972) F-4D (1972-1979)

86th Tactical Fighter Wing - Ramstein AB, Germany

512th Tactical Fighter Squadron F-4E (Yellow, Yellow & Black 1976-1985)
526th Tactical Fighter Squadron F-4E (Red, Red & Black 1970-1986)

401st Tactical Fighter Wing - Torrejon AB, Spain

612th Tactical Fighter Squadron F-4D (Blue 1971-1983)
613th Tactical Fighter Squadron F-4D (Yellow 1971-1983)
614th Tactical Fighter Squadron F-4D (Red 1971-1983)

Pacific Air Forces

3d Tactical Fighter Wing - Clark AB, Philippines

3d Tactical Fighter Squadron F-4E (1975–1991)
90th Tactical Fighter Squadron F-4E (1975-1977) F-4G (1977-1991)

8th Tactical Fighter Wing - Ubon RTAFB, Thailand
12th Tactical Fighter Wing - Cam Ranh Air Base, South Viet Nam (1964–1971)
18th Tactical Fighter Wing - Kadena AB, Japan (1967–1989)

- 21st Tactical Fighter Wing - Elmendorf AFB, Alaska (1970–1982)
- 32d Tactical Fighter Wing - George AFB, California (1964)
- 51st Tactical Fighter Wing - Osan AB, South Korea (1974–1989)

36th Tactical Fighter Squadron

- 53d Wing - Holloman AFB, New Mexico
- 54th Tactical Fighter Wing - Kunsan AB, South Korea (1970)
- 66th Tactical Reconnaissance Wing - RAF Upper Heyford, United Kingdom (1969–1970)
- 354th Tactical Fighter Wing - Kunsan AB, South Korea (1968–1970)
- 355th Tactical Fighter Wing - Davis-Monthan AFB, Arizona (1971)
- 363d Tactical Fighter Wing - Shaw AFB, South Carolina (1965–1989)
- 366th Tactical Fighter Wing - Da Nang Air Base, South Viet Nam (1969–1973)
- 388th Tactical Fighter Wing - Korat RTAFB, Thailand (1969–1973)
- 432d Tactical Fighter Wing - Udorn RTAFB, Thailand (1972–1974)

Squadrons

- 43d Tactical Fighter Squadron - Elmendorf AFB, Alaska (1964–1982)

Assigned to: 15th Tactical Fighter Wing, 8 January 1964 - 15 July 1970
Attached to: 405th Fighter Wing, 20 August 1965 – 31 October 1965
Attached to: 12th Tactical Fighter Wing, 1 November 1965 - 4 January 1966
Assigned to 21st Composite Wing, 15 July 1970 - 15 November 1977
Assigned to 343d Tactical Fighter Group, 15 November 1977 - 1 January 1980
Assigned to 21st Tactical Fighter Wing, 1 January 1980 - 1 October 1982

- 82d Aerial Targets Squadron - Tyndall AFB, Florida, (1995–2015 (Detachment 1 to Holloman AFB, New Mexico ended 2016))

Geographically Separated Unit (GSU) of 53d Wing at Eglin AFB, Florida

Air Force Reserve

- 301st Tactical Fighter Wing - Carswell AFB, Texas (F-4D, F-4E)
- 482d Tactical Fighter Wing - Homestead AFB, Florida (F-4C, F-4D)
- 924th Tactical Fighter Group - Bergstrom AFB, Texas (F-4D, F-4E)

Air National Guard

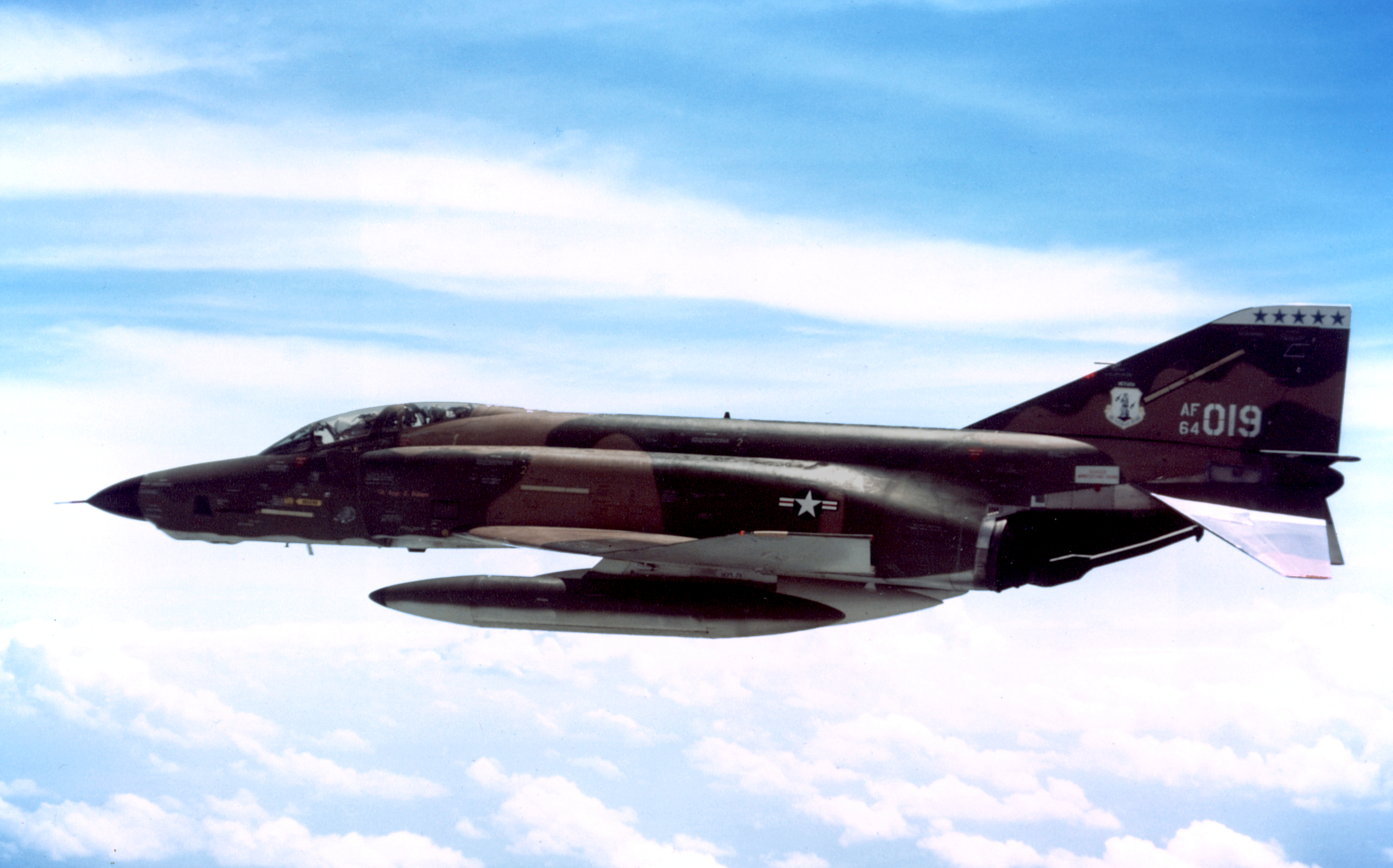
An RF-4C with auxiliary fuel tanks in flight August 1968. This aircraft was assigned to the 152nd Tactical Reconnaissance Group, Nevada Air National Guard

- Alabama Air National Guard

116th Reconnaissance Squadron, 117th Reconnaissance Wing (RF-4C)

- Arkansas Air National Guard

184th Tactical Fighter Squadron, 188th Tactical Fighter Group (F-4C)

- California Air National Guard

194th Fighter Interceptor Squadron, 144th Fighter Interceptor Wing (F-4D)
196th Tactical Fighter Squadron, 163rd Tactical Fighter Group (F-4C, F-4E)
196th Reconnaissance Squadron, 163rd Reconnaissance Group (RF-4C)

- District of Columbia Air National Guard

121st Tactical Fighter Squadron, 113th Tactical Fighter Wing (F-4D)

- Georgia Air National Guard

128th Tactical Fighter Squadron, 116th Tactical Fighter Wing (F-4D)

- Hawaii Air National Guard

199th Tactical Fighter Squadron, 154th Group (F-4C)

- Idaho Air National Guard

Reconnaissance Weapons School, 189th Tactical Reconnaissance Training Flight, 190th Tactical Reconnaissance Squadron, 124th Tactical Reconnaissance Group (RF-4C)
190th Fighter Squadron, 124th Fighter Group (RF-4C, F-4G)

- Illinois Air National Guard

170th Tactical Fighter Squadron, 183rd Tactical Fighter Group (F-4C, F-4D)

- Indiana Air National Guard

163d Tactical Fighter Squadron, 122d Tactical Fighter Group (F-4C and F-4E)
113th Tactical Fighter Squadron, 181st Tactical Fighter Group (F-4C and F-4E)

- Kansas Air National Guard

127th Tactical Fighter Squadron and 177th Tactical Fighter Training Squadron, 184th Tactical Fighter Group (F-4D)

- Kentucky Air National Guard

165th Tactical Reconnaissance Squadron, 123d Tactical Reconnaissance Wing (RF-4C)

- Louisiana Air National Guard

122d Tactical Fighter Squadron, 159th Tactical Fighter Group (F-4C)

- Michigan Air National Guard

171st Tactical Fighter Squadron, 191st Tactical Fighter Group (F-4C and F-4D)

- Minnesota Air National Guard

179th Tactical Reconnaissance Squadron, 179th Fighter-Interceptor Squadron; 148th Tactical Reconnaissance Group, 148th Fighter Interceptor Group (RF-4C and F-4D)

- Mississippi Air National Guard

153d Tactical Reconnaissance Squadron; 186th Tactical Reconnaissance Group (RF-4C)

- Missouri Air National Guard

110th Tactical Fighter Squadron, 131st Tactical Fighter Group (F-4C and F-4E)

- Nebraska Air National Guard

173d Tactical Reconnaissance Squadron, 173d Reconnaissance Squadron; 155th Tactical Reconnaissance Group, 155th Reconnaissance Group (RF-4C)

- Nevada Air National Guard

192d Tactical Reconnaissance Squadron, later 192d Reconnaissance Squadron; 152d Tactical Reconnaissance Group, later 152d Reconnaissance Group (RF-4C)

- New Jersey Air National Guard

141st Tactical Fighter Squadron, 108th Tactical Fighter Group (F-4D and F-4E)

- New York Air National Guard

136th Fighter-Interceptor Squadron, 107th Fighter-Interceptor Group (F-4C and F-4D)

- North Dakota Air National Guard

178th Fighter-Interceptor Squadron, 119th Fighter-Interceptor Group (F-4D)

- Oregon Air National Guard

123d Fighter-Interceptor Squadron, 142d Fighter-Interceptor Wing (F-4C)

- Texas Air National Guard

111th Fighter-Interceptor Squadron, 147th Fighter-Interceptor Wing (F-4C and F-4D)
182d Tactical Fighter Squadron, 149th Tactical Fighter Group (F-4C)

- Vermont Air National Guard

134th Tactical Fighter Squadron, 158th Tactical Fighter Group (F-4D)

== U.S. Navy ==
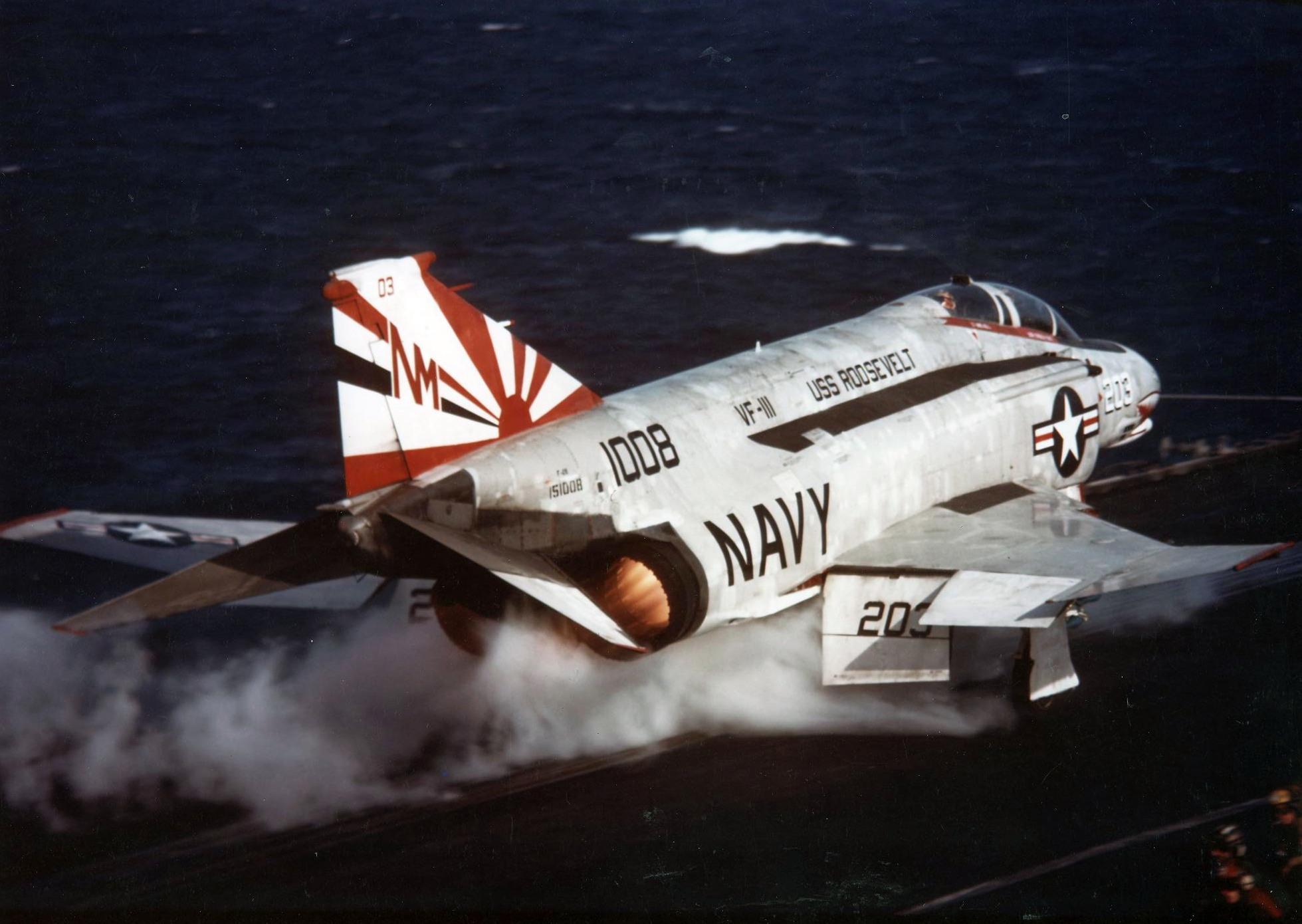
F-4N VF-111 launching from CV-42 1977

The Phantom entered service with the U.S. Navy on 30 December 1960 with the VF-121 Pacemakers at NAS Miramar. The VF-74 Be-devilers at NAS Oceana became the first deployable Phantom squadron when it received its F4H-1s (F-4Bs) on 8 July 1961.

=== Frontline & Reserve ===
- U.S. Atlantic Fleet / Naval Air Force Atlantic - All based at NAS Oceana, Virginia
  - VF-11 "Red Rippers"
  - VF-31 "Tomcatters"
  - VF-14 "Tophatters"
  - VF-32 "Swordsmen"
  - VF-33 "Tarsiers" (Also known as the "Starfighters")
  - VF-102 "Diamondbacks"
  - VF-41 "Black Aces"
  - VF-84 "Jolly Rogers" (Formerly known as the "Vagabonds")
  - VF-74 "Bedevilers"
  - VF-103 "Sluggers"
- U.S. Pacific Fleet / Naval Air Force Pacific - All based at NAS Miramar, California with exception of two squadrons forward deployed to / based at NAF Atsugi, Japan
  - VF-21 "Freelancers"
  - VF-154 "Black Knights"
  - VF-51 "Screaming Eagles"
  - VF-111 "Sundowners"
  - VF-92 "Silver Kings"
  - VF-96 "Fighting Falcons"
  - VF-114 "Aardvarks"
  - VF-213 "Black Lions"
  - VF-142 "Ghostriders" (Later transferred to Atlantic Fleet prior to conversion to the F-14 Tomcat)
  - VF-143 "Pukin Dogs" (Later transferred to Atlantic Fleet prior to conversion to the F-14 Tomcat)
  - VF-151 "Vigilantes"
  - VF-161 "Chargers"
  - VF-191 "Satan's Kittens"
  - VF-194 "Red Lightnings"
- United States Naval Reserve / Naval Air Reserve Force
  - VF-201 "Hunters" (Atlantic Fleet) - Based at NAS Dallas, Texas
  - VF-202 "Superheats" (Atlantic Fleet) - Based at NAS Dallas, Texas
  - VF-301 "Devil's Disciples" (Pacific Fleet) - Based at NAS Miramar, California
  - VF-302 "Stallions" (Pacific Fleet) - Based at NAS Miramar, California
  - VF-22L1 {no nickname assigned} (Pacific Fleet) - Based at NAS Los Alamitos, California; later merged into VF-301 and VF-302 at NAS Miramar
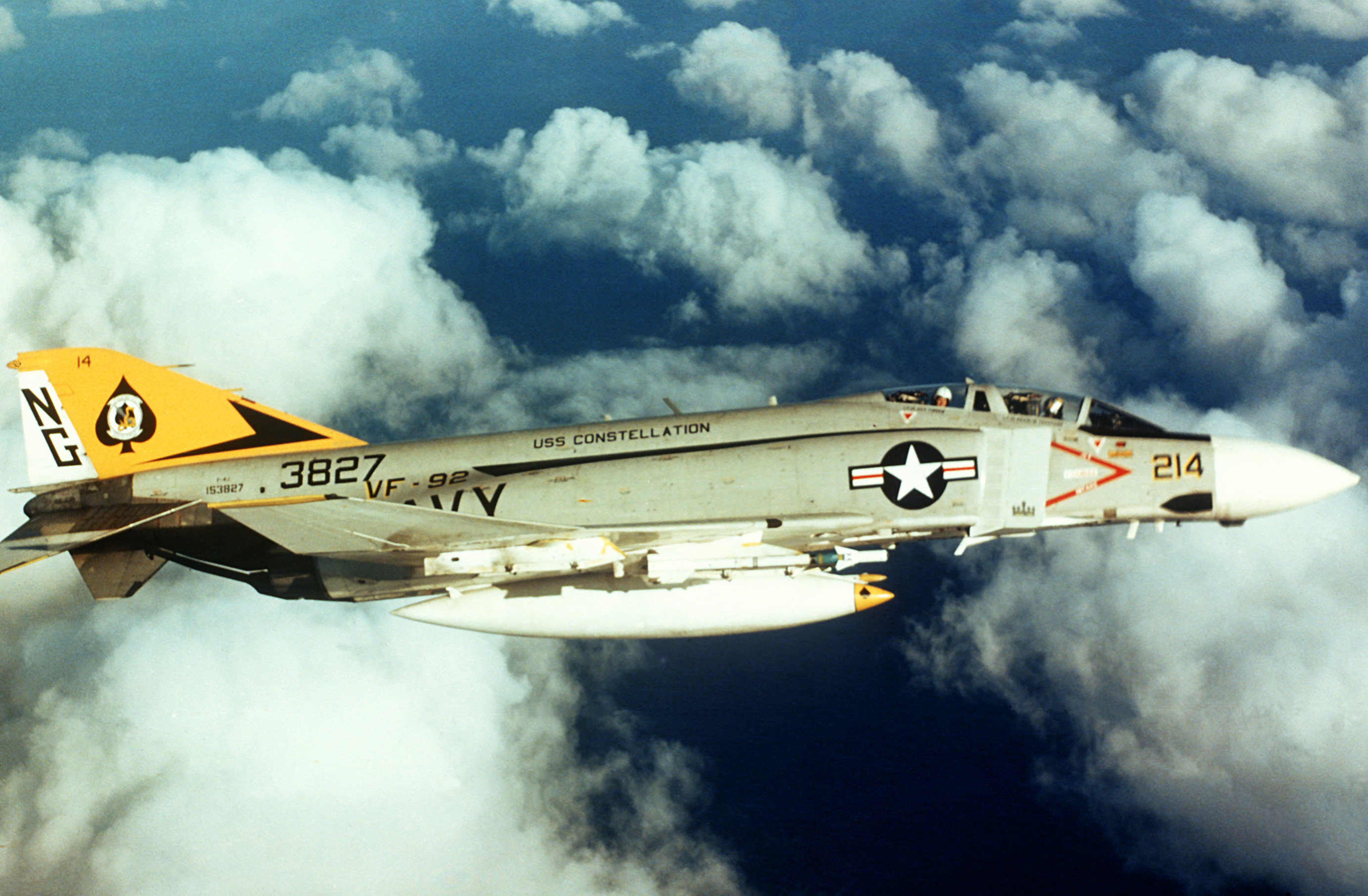
An F-4J Phantom II of Fighter Squadron VF-92 Silver Kings, from the USS Constellation

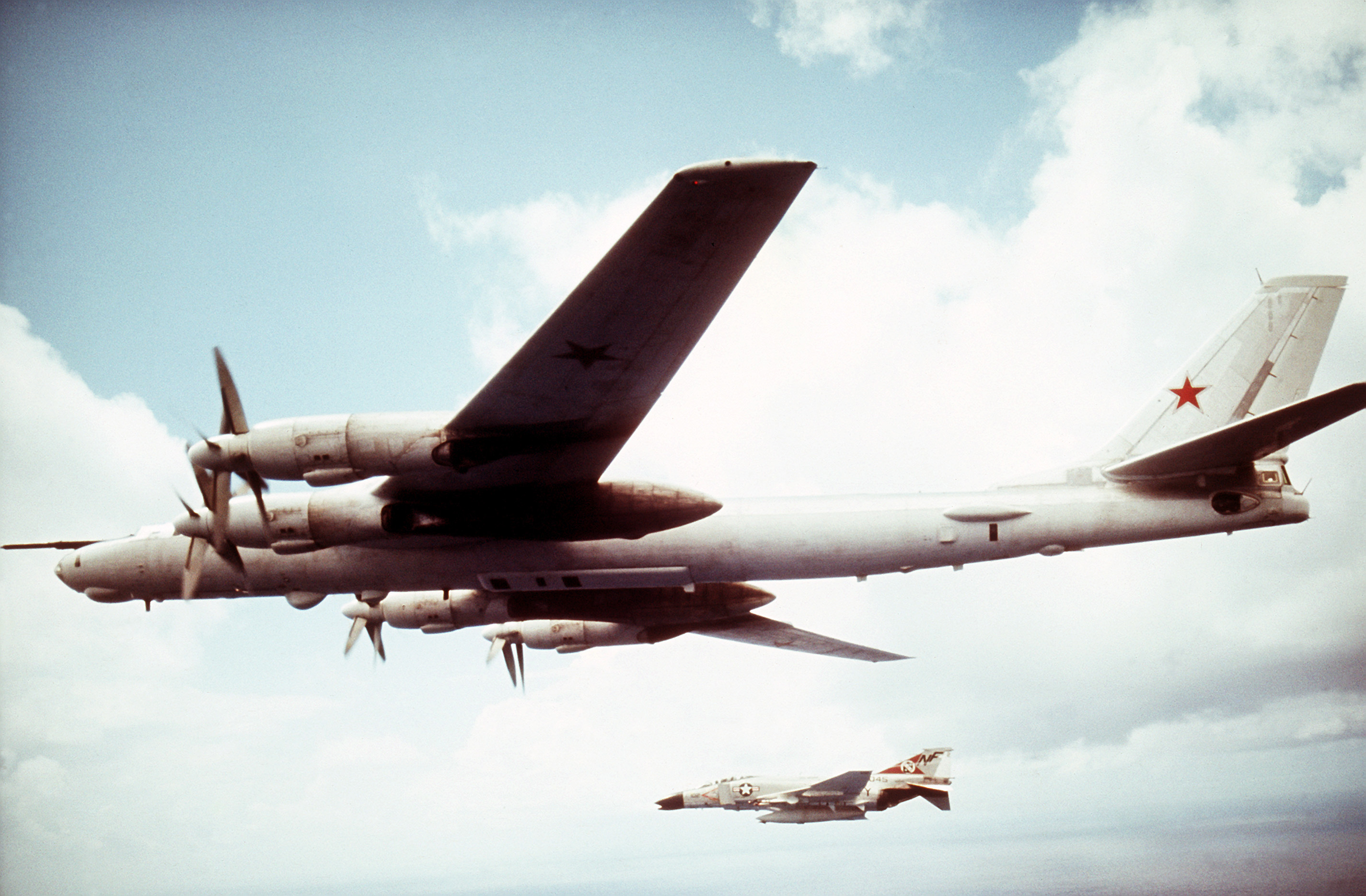
F-4B Phantom of VF-161 intercepting Soviet Tu-95 in 1971

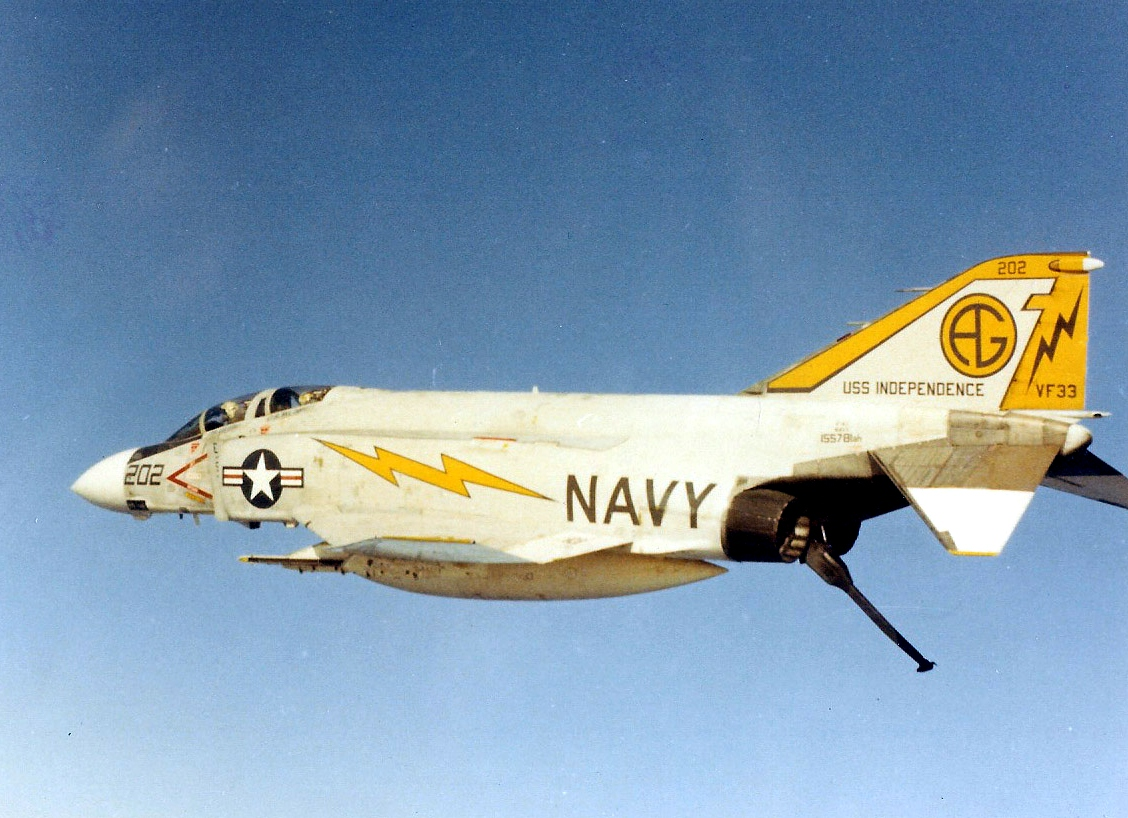
F-4J Phantom II of VF-33 in flight in 1970

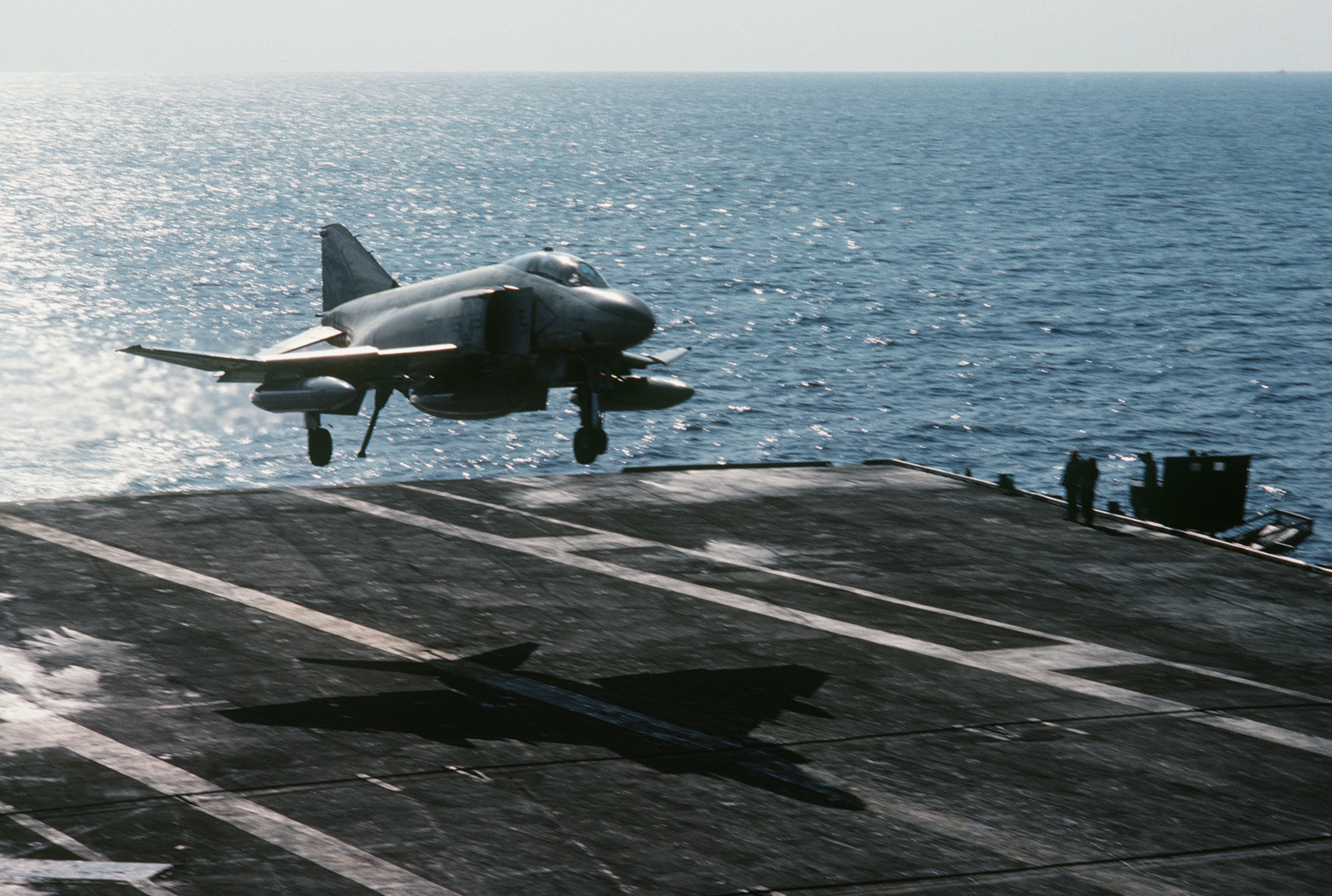
F-4S of VF-161 landing on USS Midway (CV-41) in 1981

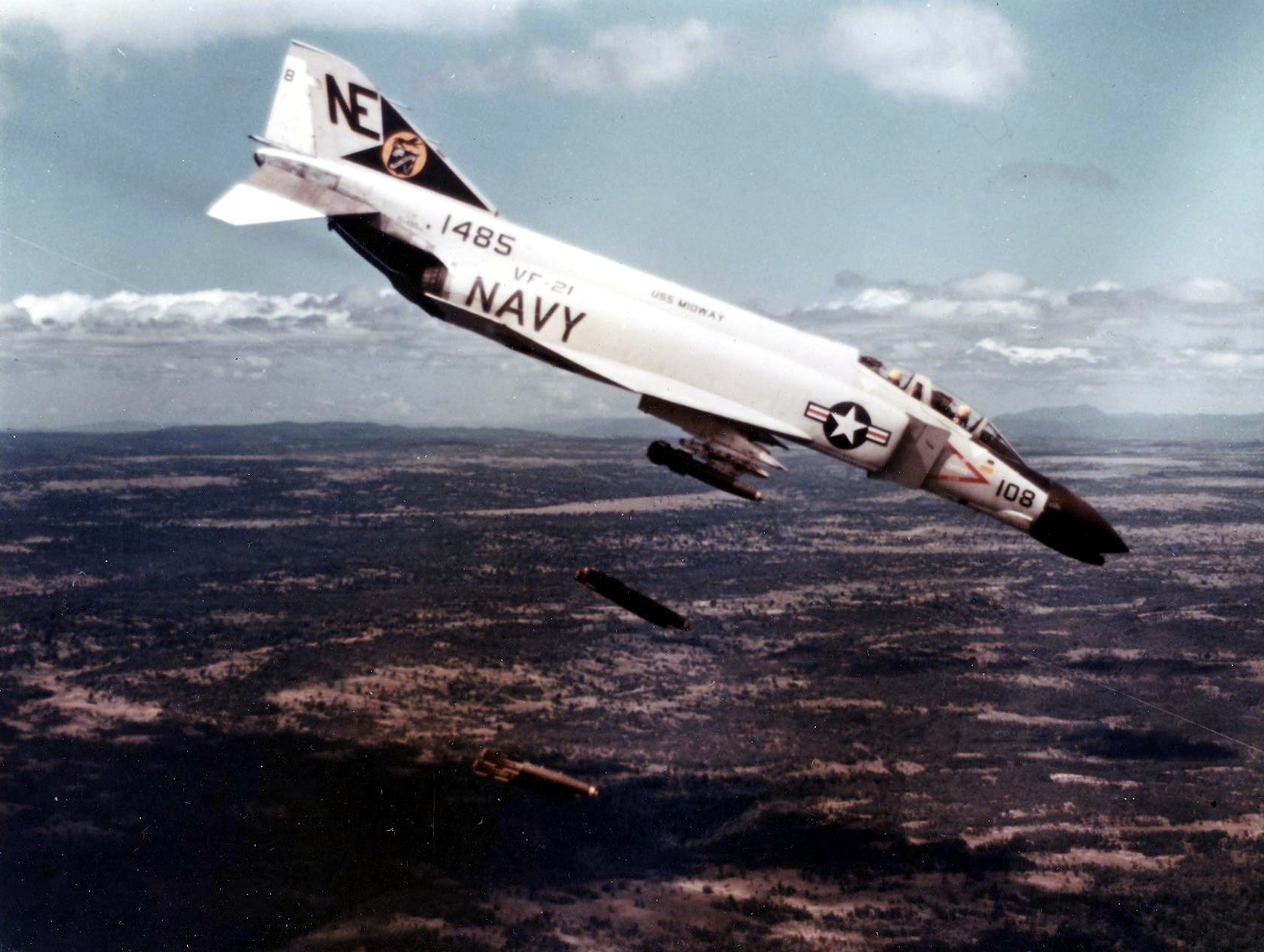
F-4B Phantom of VF-21 dropping bombs over Vietnam 1965

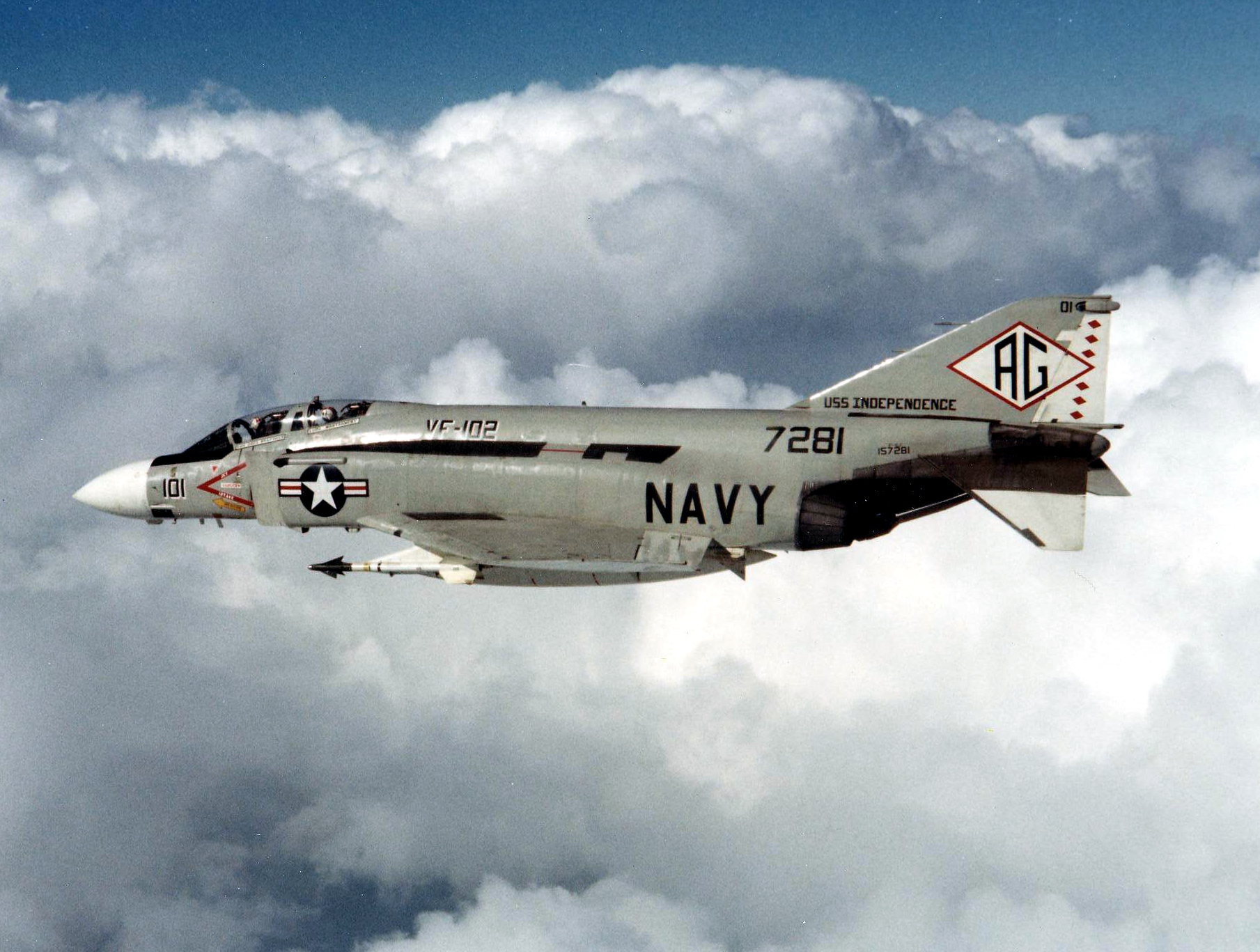
F-4J Phantom of VF-102 in flight c1977

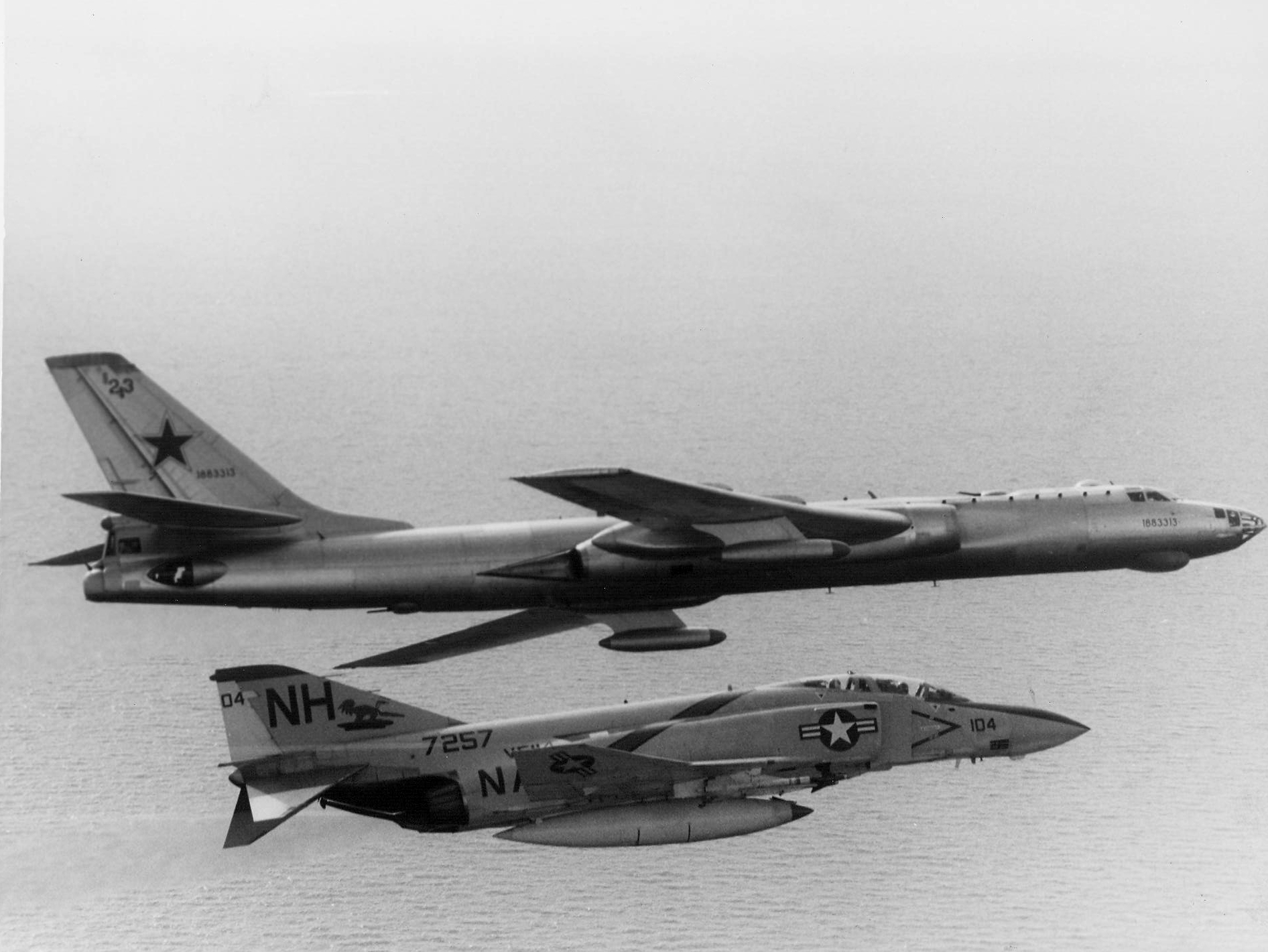
F-4J Phantom of VF-114 intercepting Soviet Tu-16 1975

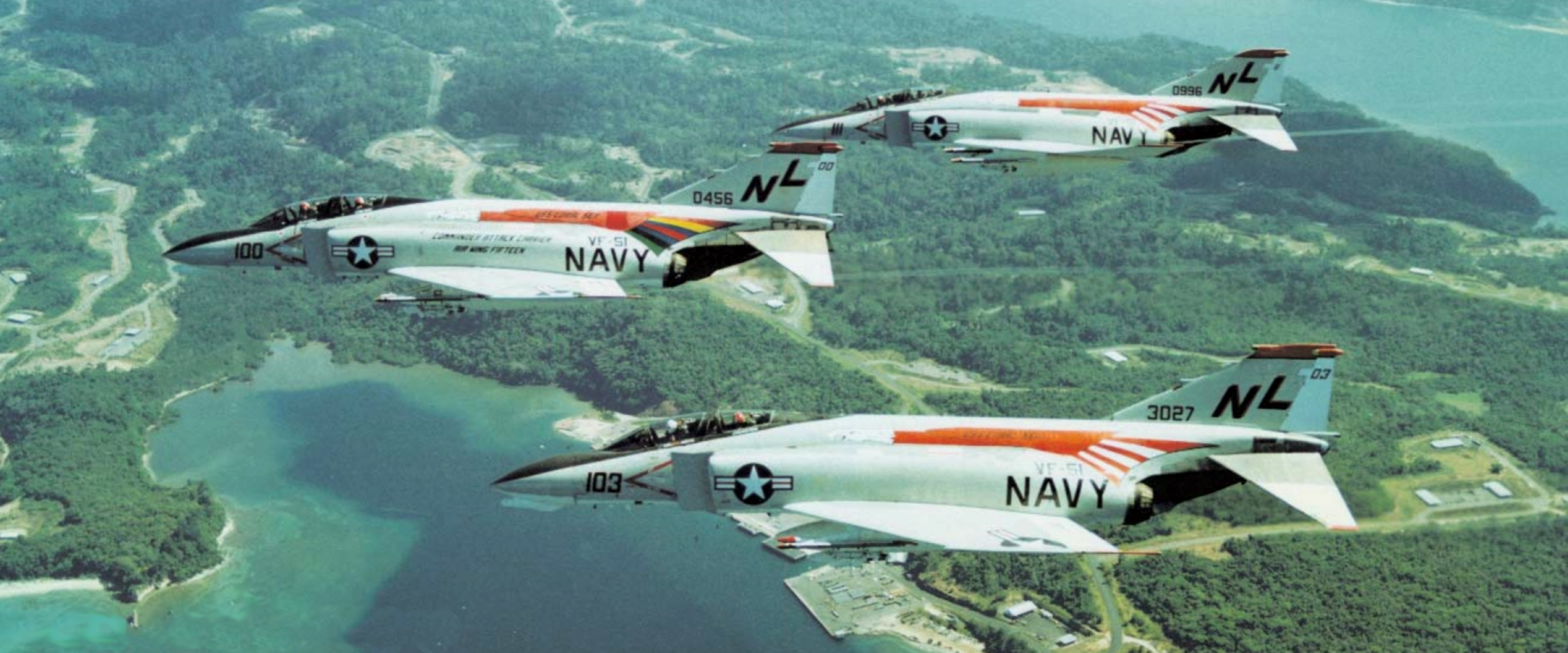
F-4B Phantoms VF-51 Screaming Eagles in flight c1971

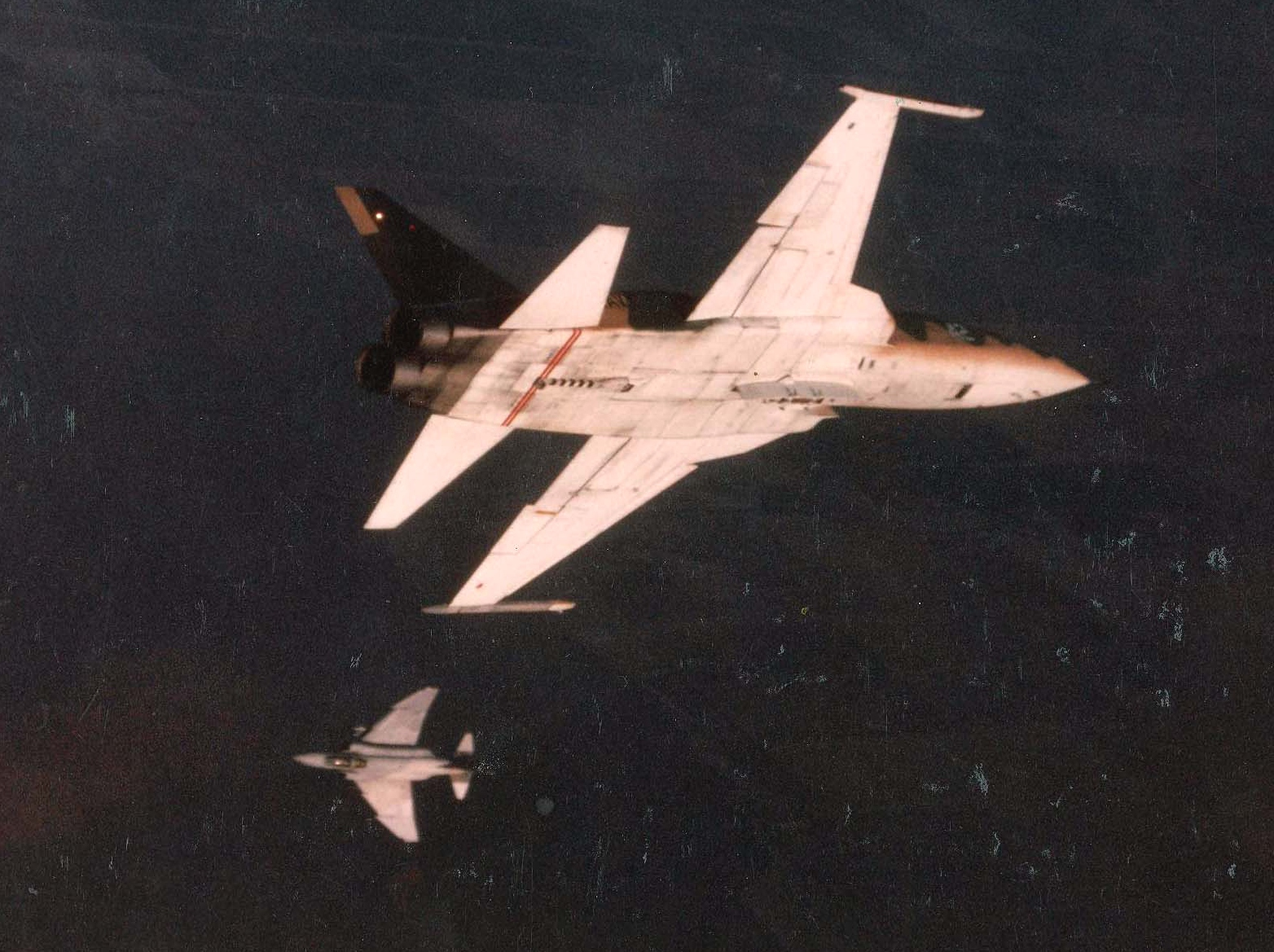
F-5E and F-4S during air combat maneuvering in 1982

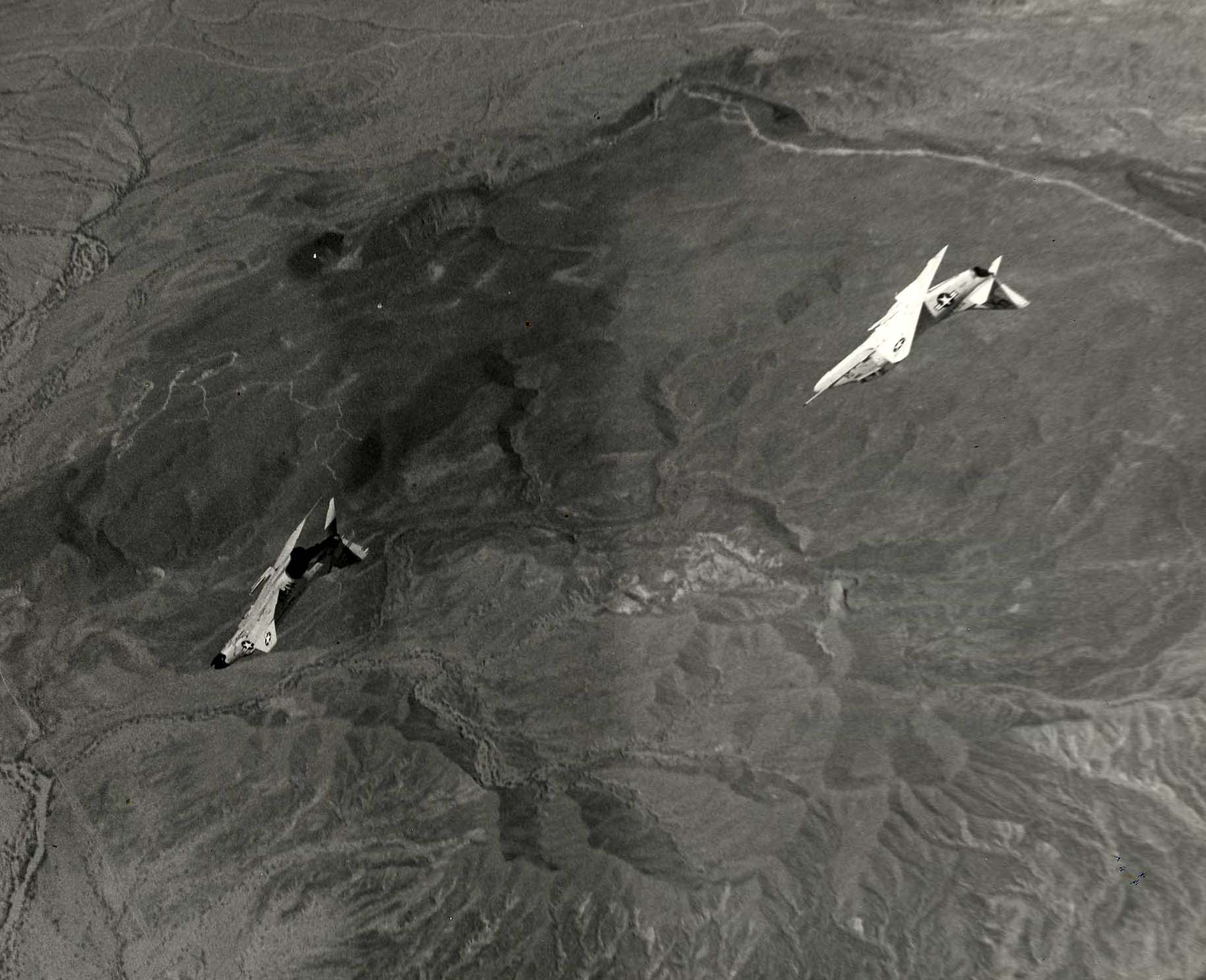
TA-4F of VC-13 and F-4N of VF-301 during air combat maneuvering 1979

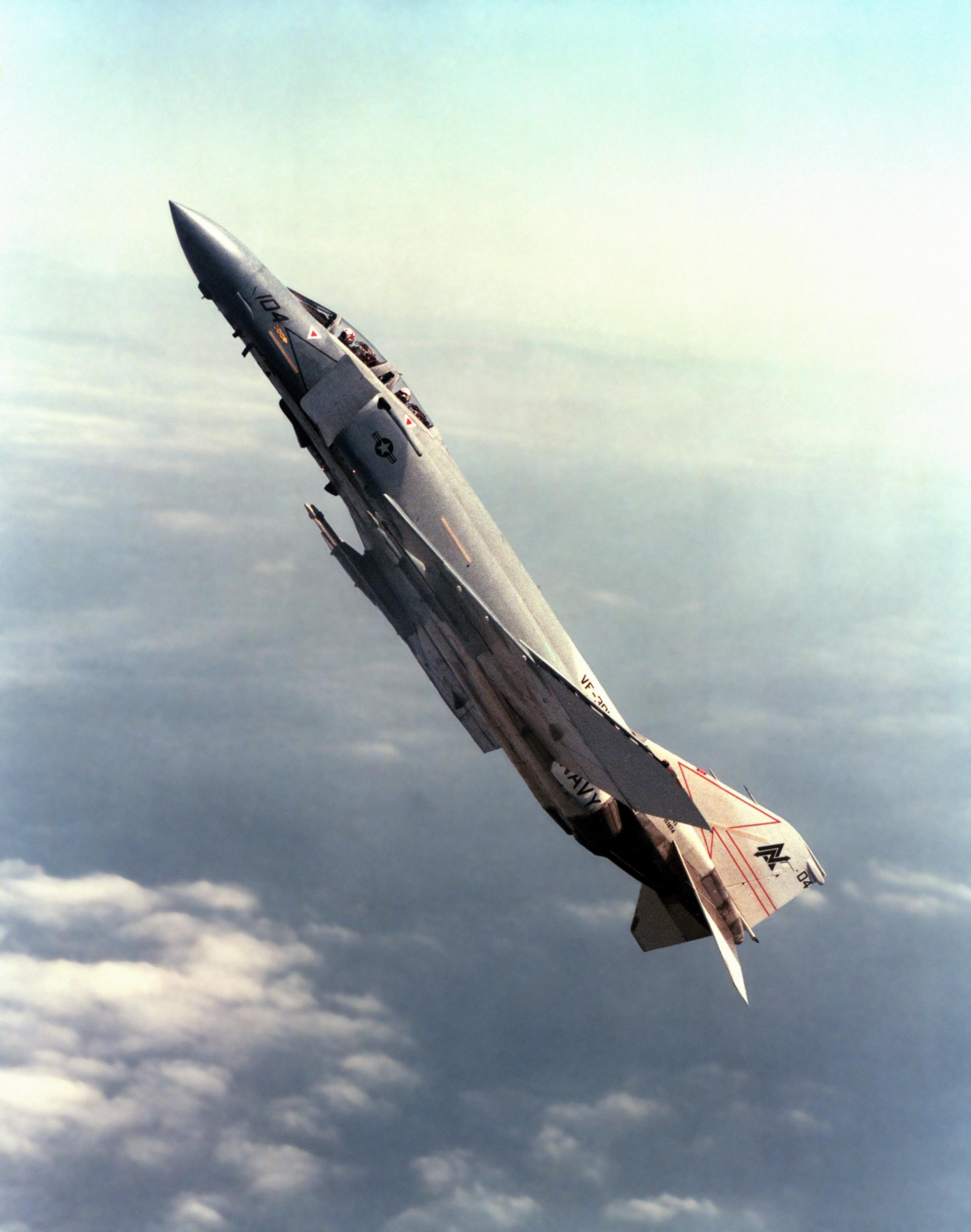
F-4S VF-301 in steep climb 1984

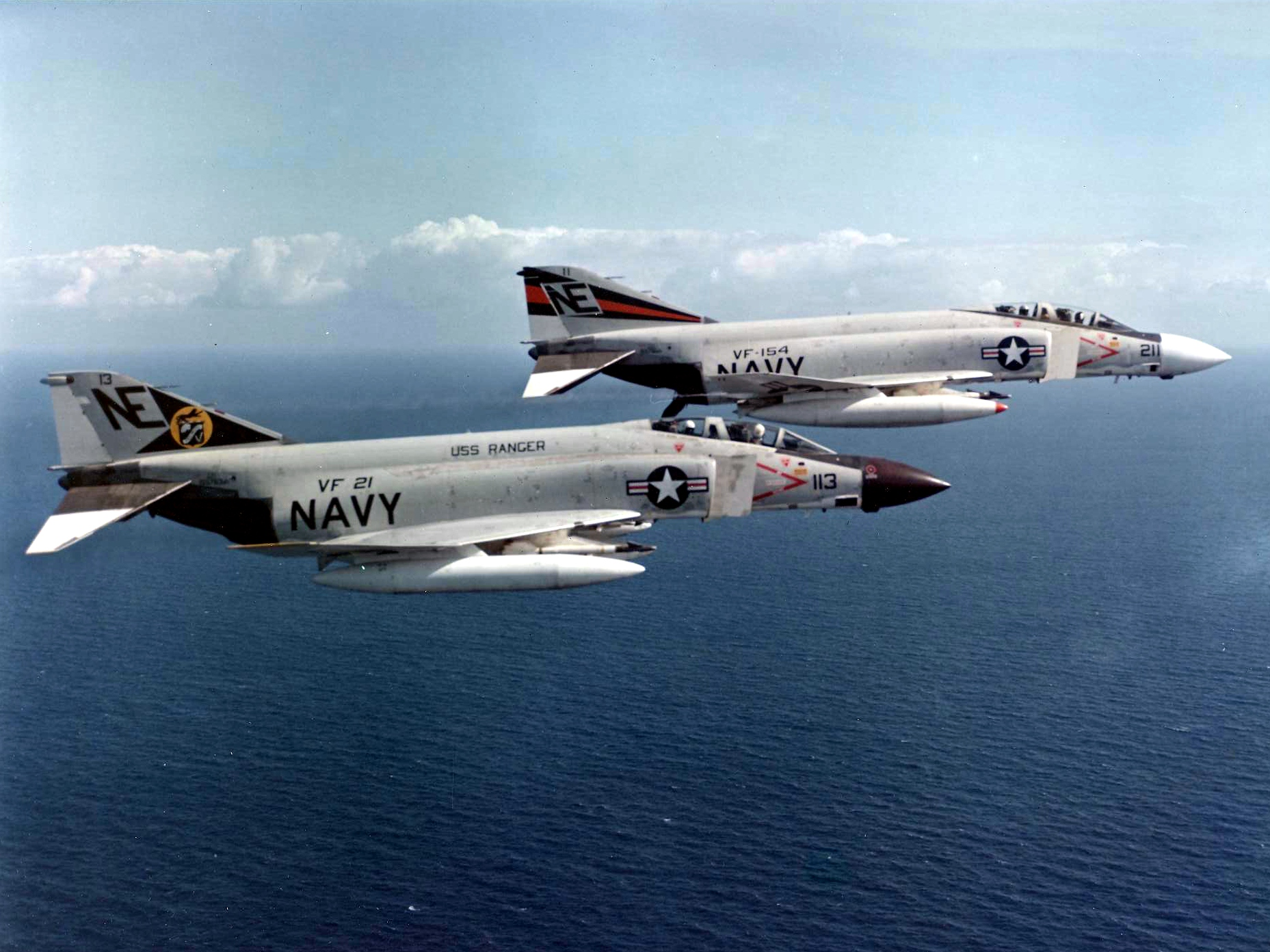
F-4J Phantoms of VF-21 and VF-154 in flight c1970

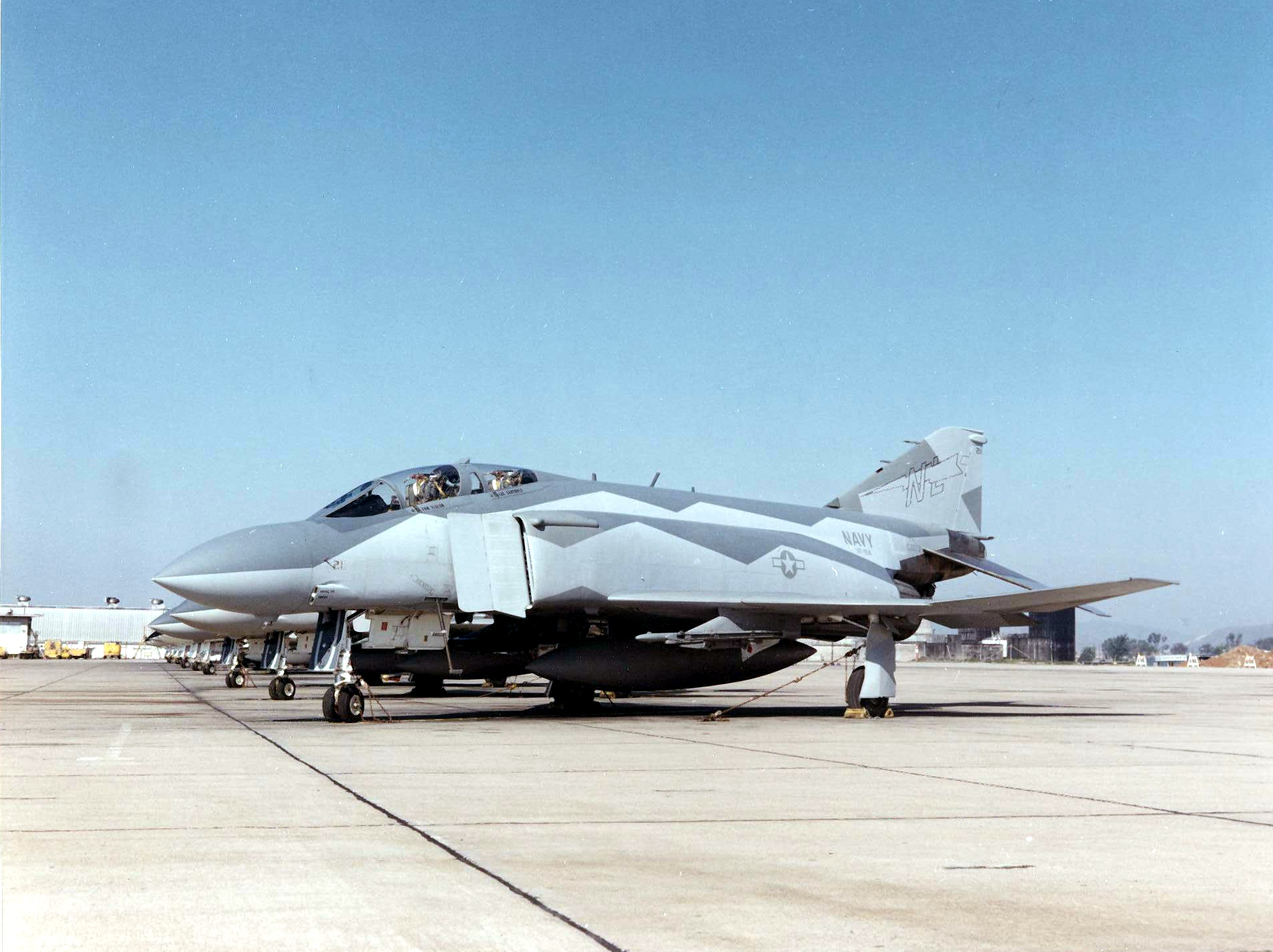
F-4J Phantoms of VF-194 at NAS Miramar 1976

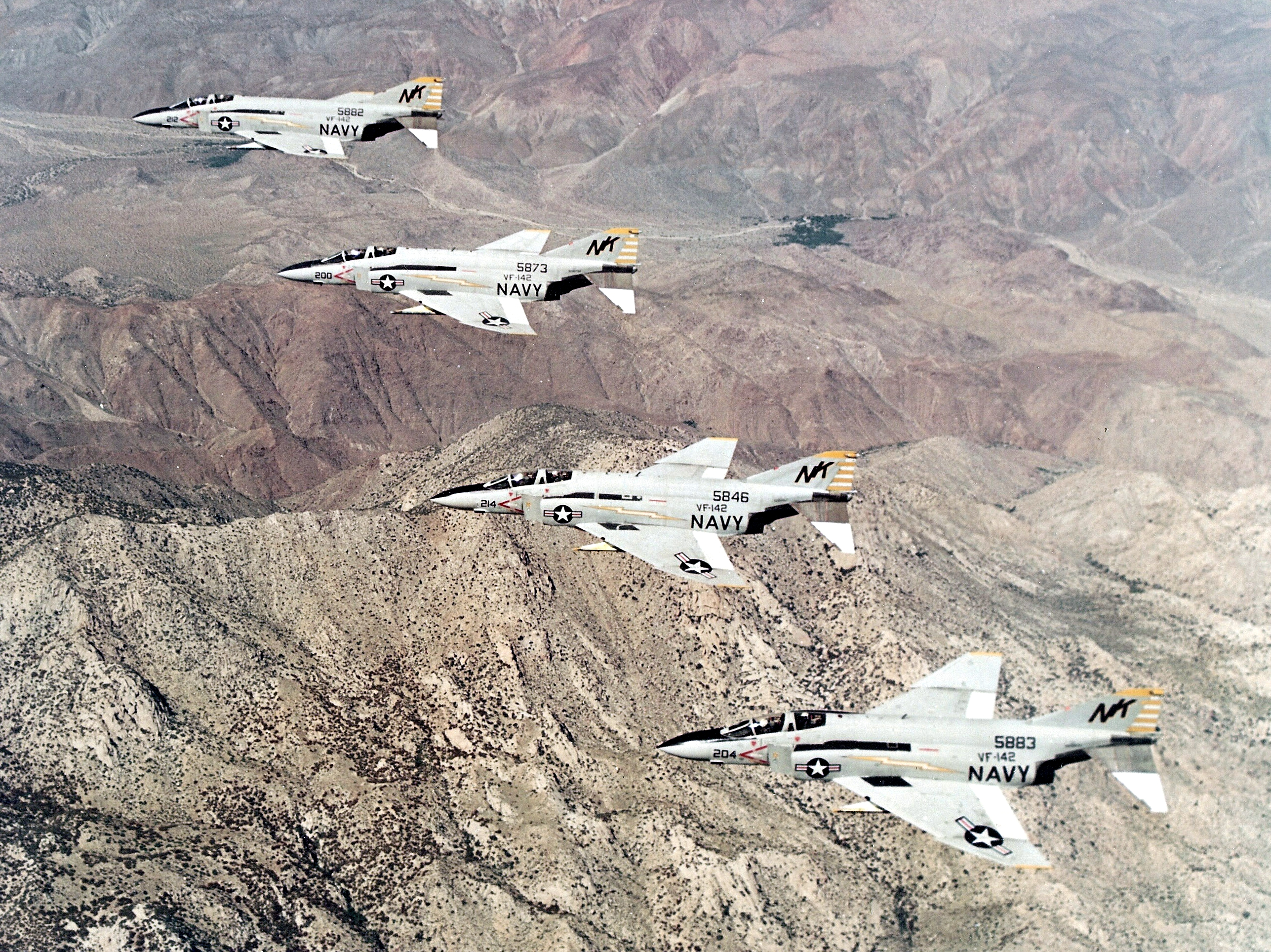
F-4J Phantoms of VF-142 in flight c1971

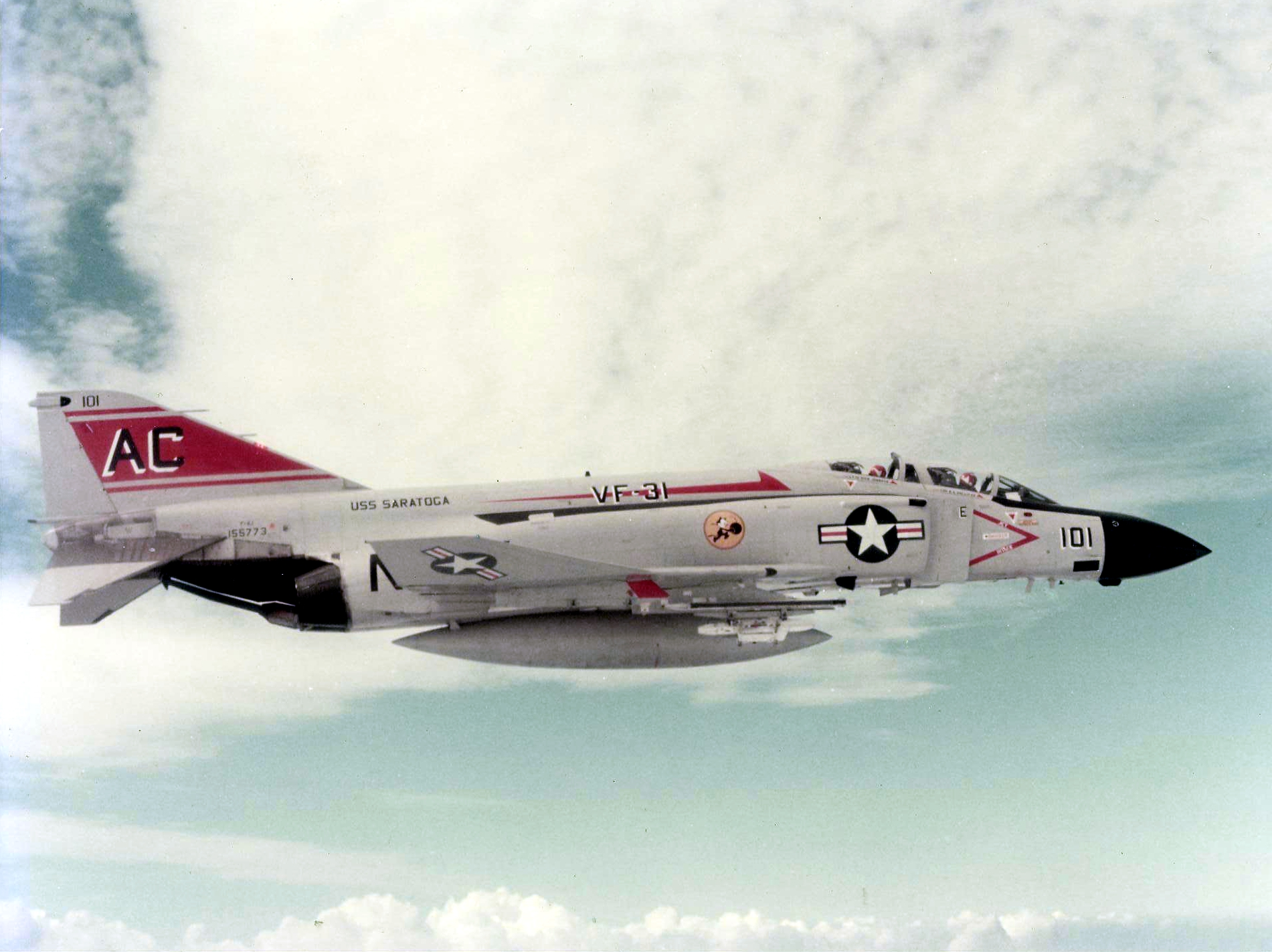
F-4J Phantom II of VF-31 in flight c1978

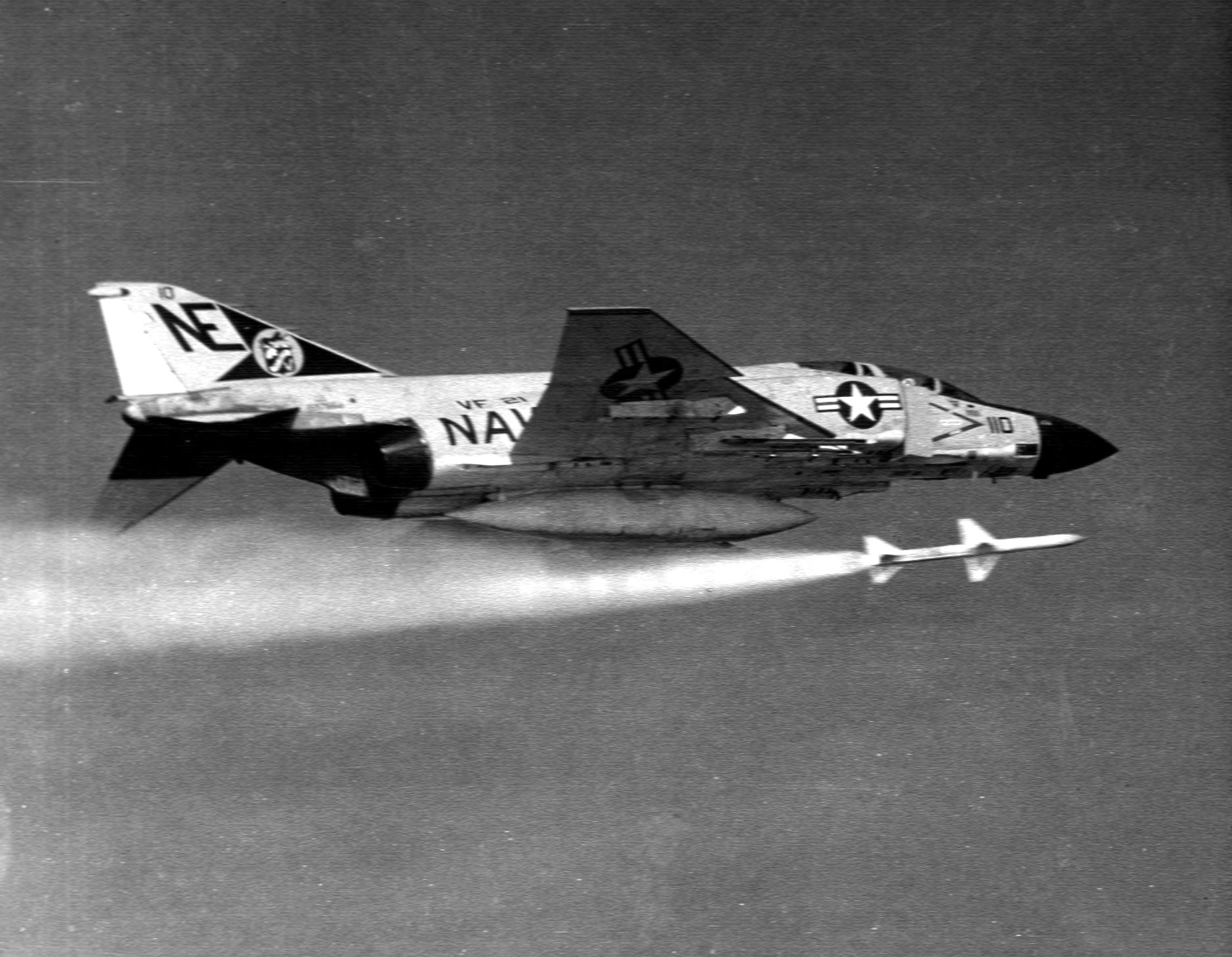
F-4J from VF-21 launching Sparrow missile c1970

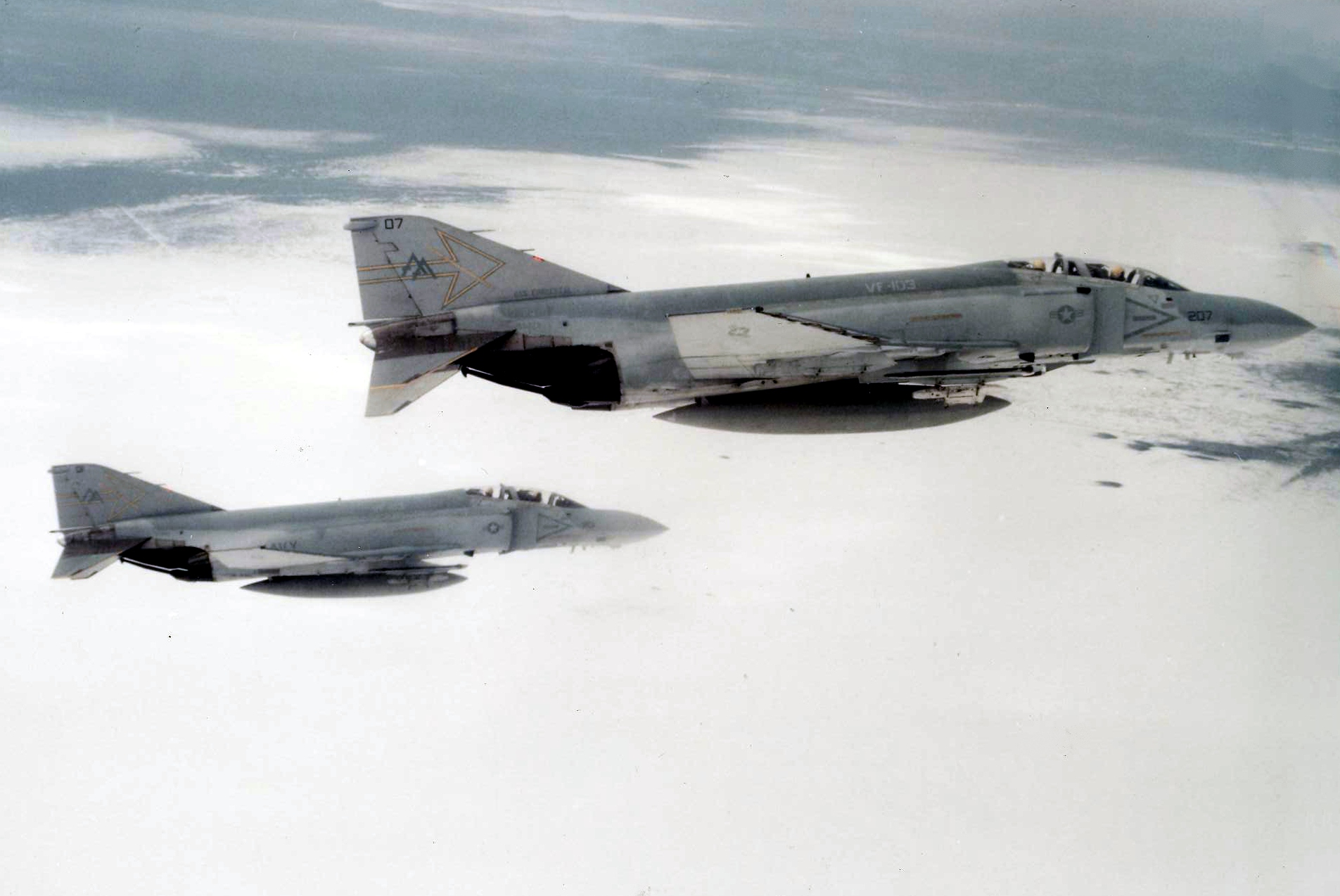
F-4S Phantom IIs of VF-103 in flight over Nevada in 1982

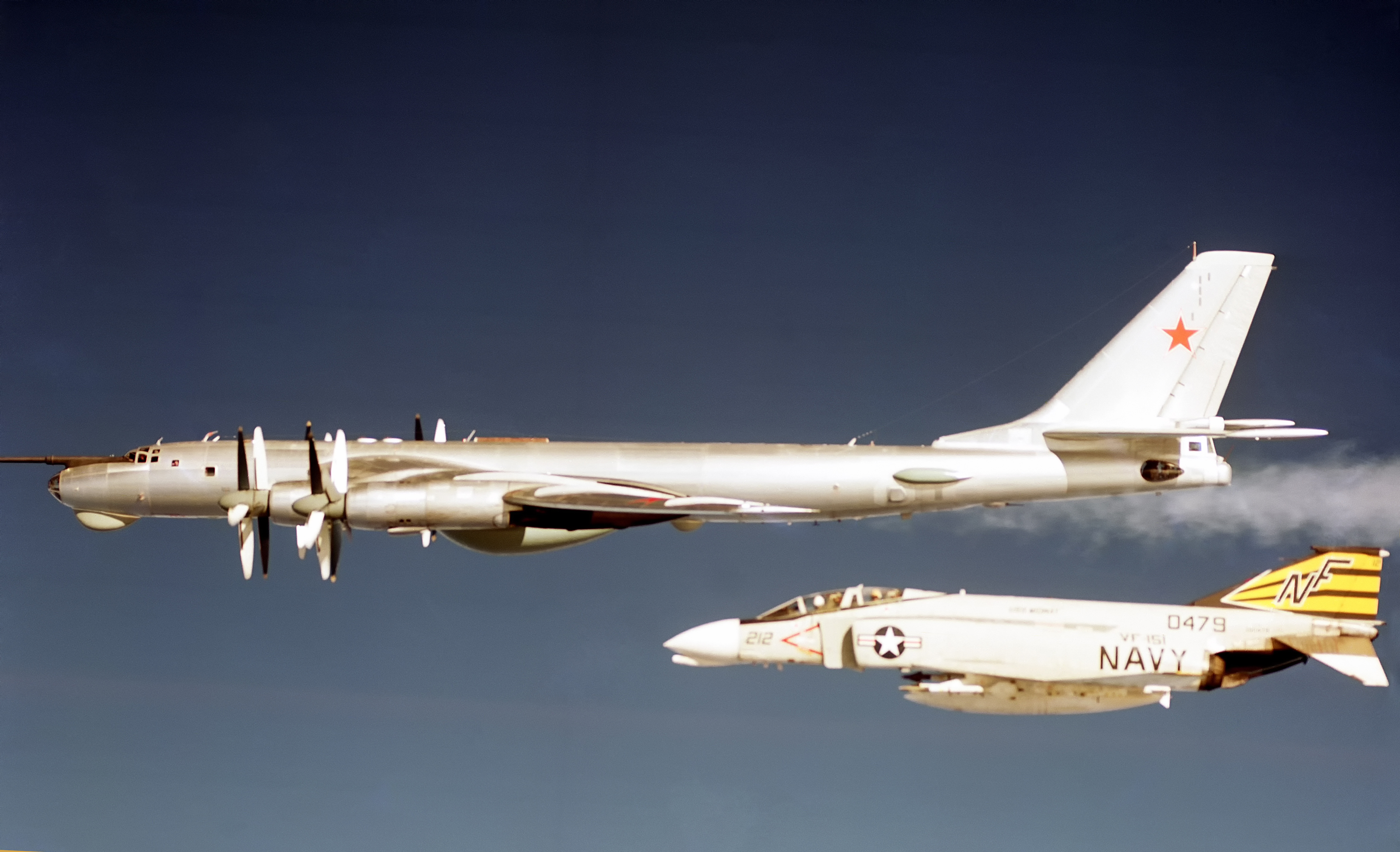
F-4B VF-151 CV-41 TU-95

=== Fleet Replacement Training ===
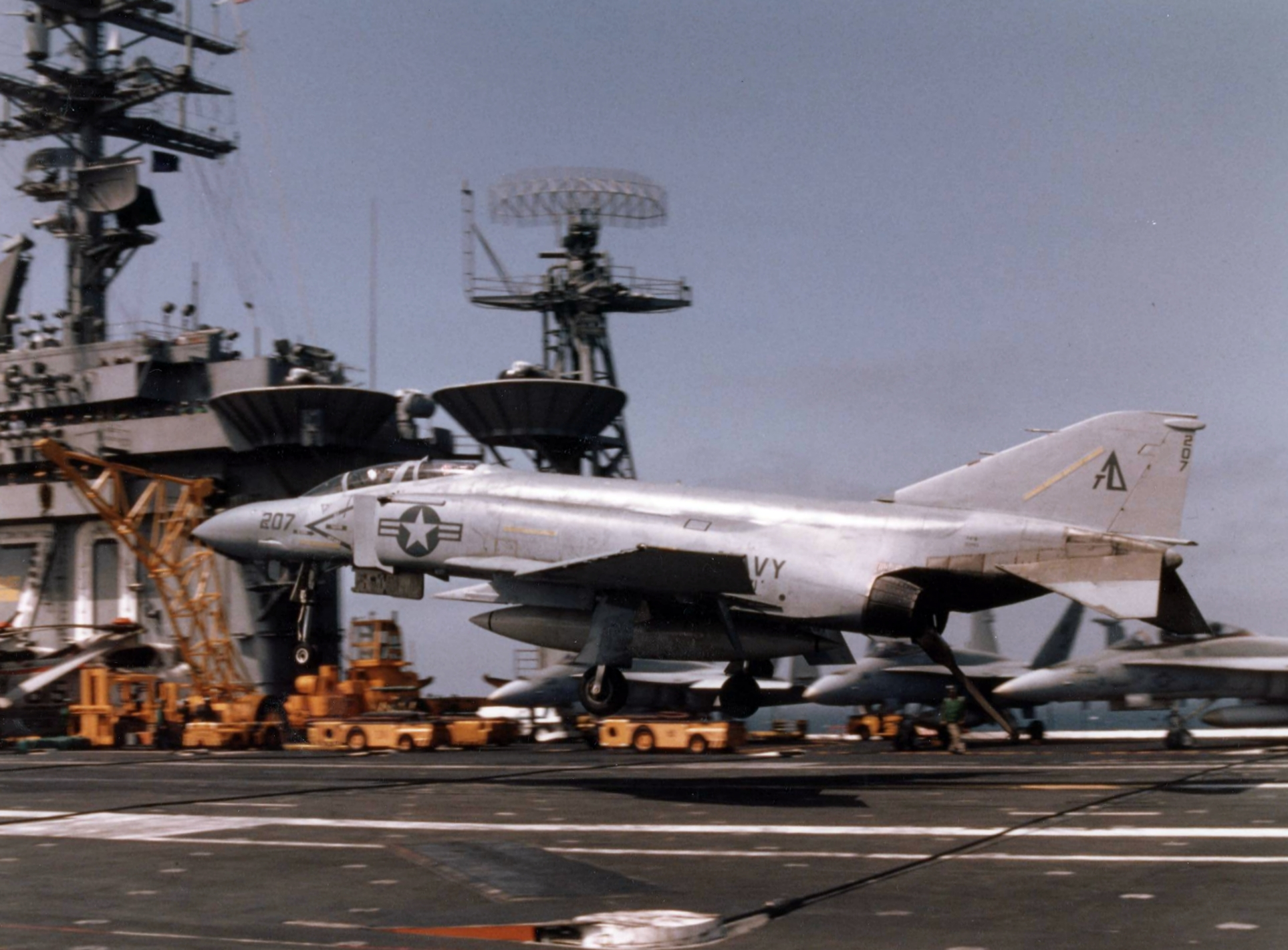
F-4S VF-171 landing on USS Carl Vinson (CVN-70) c1984

These kind of units are known in Navy parlance as Replacement Air Groups (RAG) or Fleet Replacement Squadrons (FRS). The purpose of these particular training units was to provide fleet squadrons with F-4 Phantom-qualified aircrew and maintenance personnel. During the Vietnam War, they also furnished spare aircraft to replace those lost in combat.

- VF-101 "Grim Reapers" (Atlantic Fleet) - Based at NAS Oceana, Virginia

The DACT detachment of VF-101 was located at NAS Key West, Florida and flew both the A-4 Skyhawk and the F-4 Phantom II.

- VF-121 "Pacemakers" (Pacific Fleet) - Based at NAS Miramar, California
- VF-171 "Aces" (Atlantic Fleet) - Based at NAS Oceana, Virginia.

The DACT detachment of VF-171 was located at NAS Key West, Florida, and flew the A-4 Skyhawk and the F-4 Phantom II. VF-171 assumed the Atlantic Fleet F-4 Fleet Replacement Squadron training role upon VF-101's transition to becoming the Fleet Replacement Squadron for the F-14 Tomcat.

=== Fleet Support ===
These units provided services to the fleet such as air combat training and enemy electronic warfare simulation support.

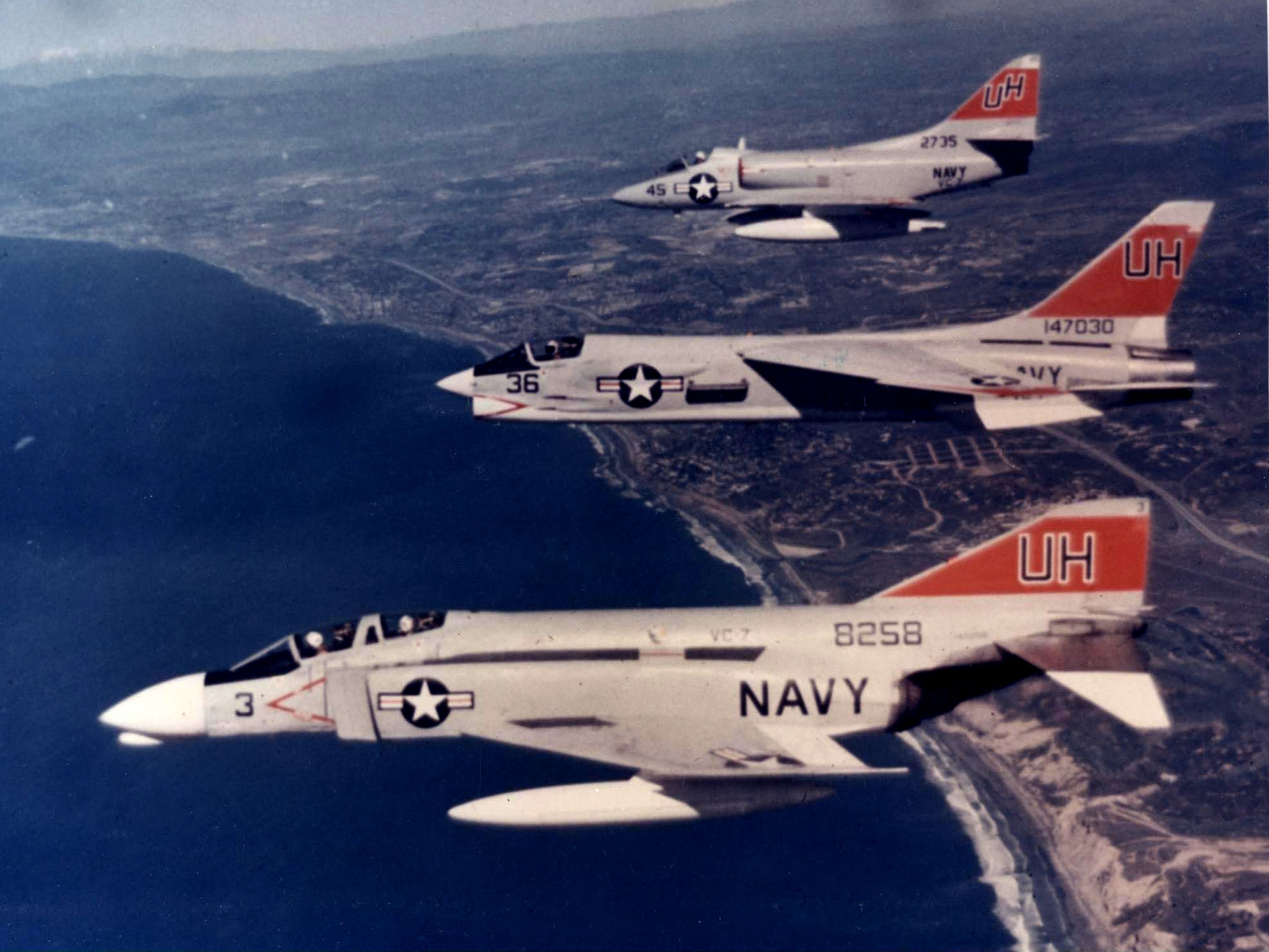
F-4A F-8C and A-4B of VC-7 in flight c1968

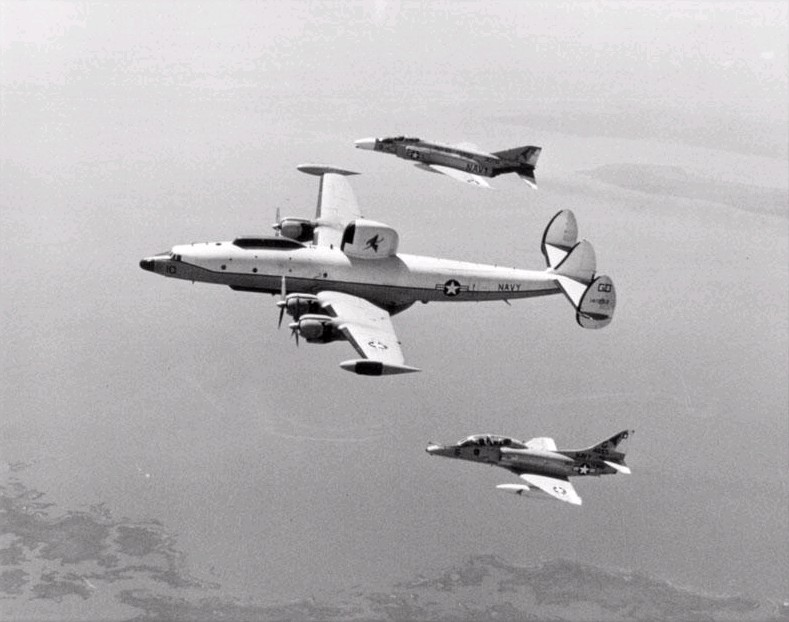
Warning Star Skyhawk Phantom VAQ-33 1973
- VC-7 "Tallyhoers" - Based at NAS Miramar, California
- VAQ-33 "Firebirds" - Initially based at NAS Norfolk, Virginia; later transferred to NAS Key West, Florida in 1980

=== Flight Demonstration, Development, Test & Evaluation ===
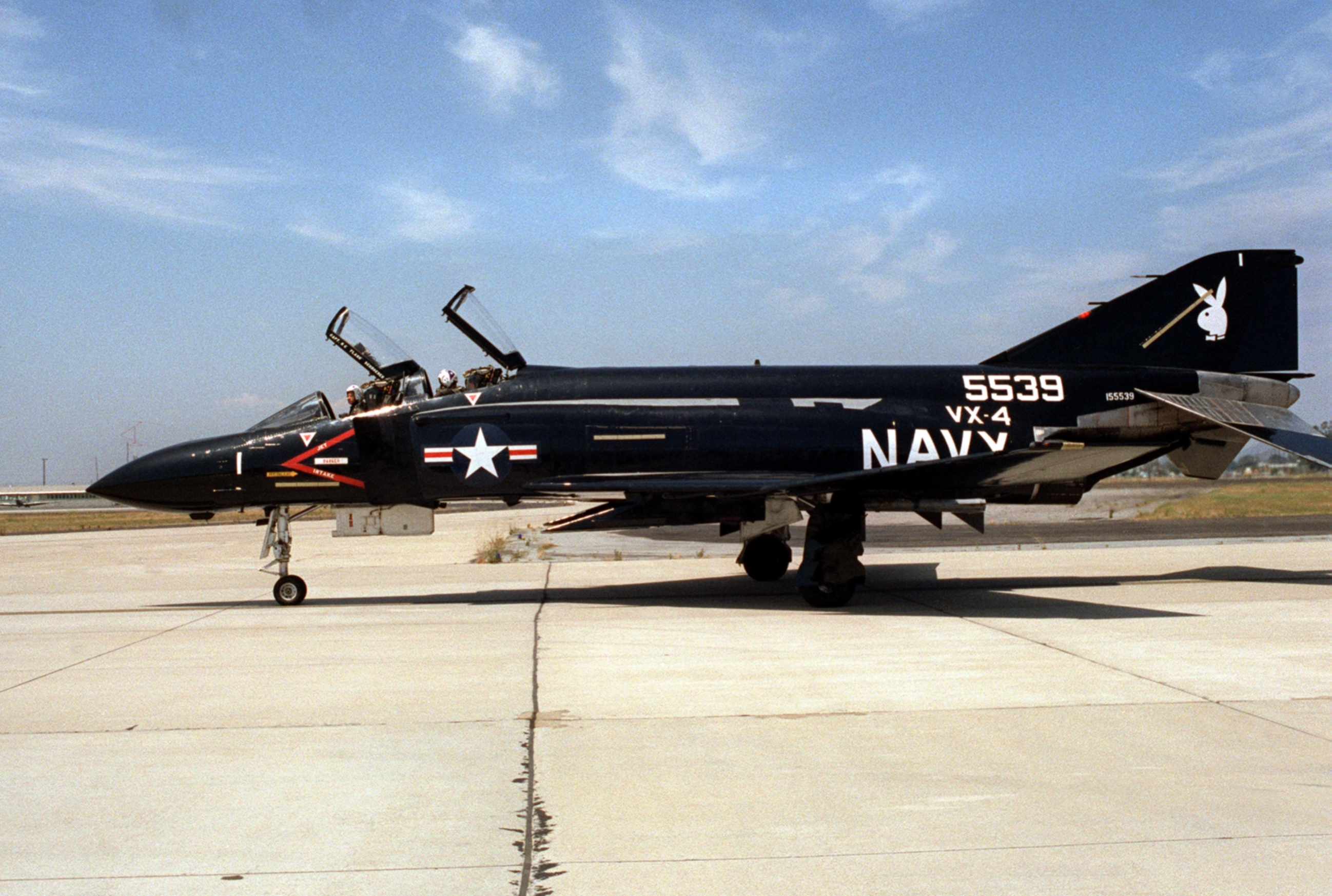
Bunny F-4S VX-4 at Point Mugu 1982

- U.S. Navy Flight Demonstration Squadron, the Blue Angels - Based at NAS Pensacola, Florida with winter training detachment operations at NAF El Centro, California (1969–1974)
- VX-4 "Evaluators" - Based at NAS Point Mugu, California
- VX-5 "Vampires" - Based at NAS China Lake, California
- VX-30 "Bloodhounds" - Based at NAS Point Mugu, California
- Strike Aircraft Test Directorate - Based at NAS Patuxent River, Maryland
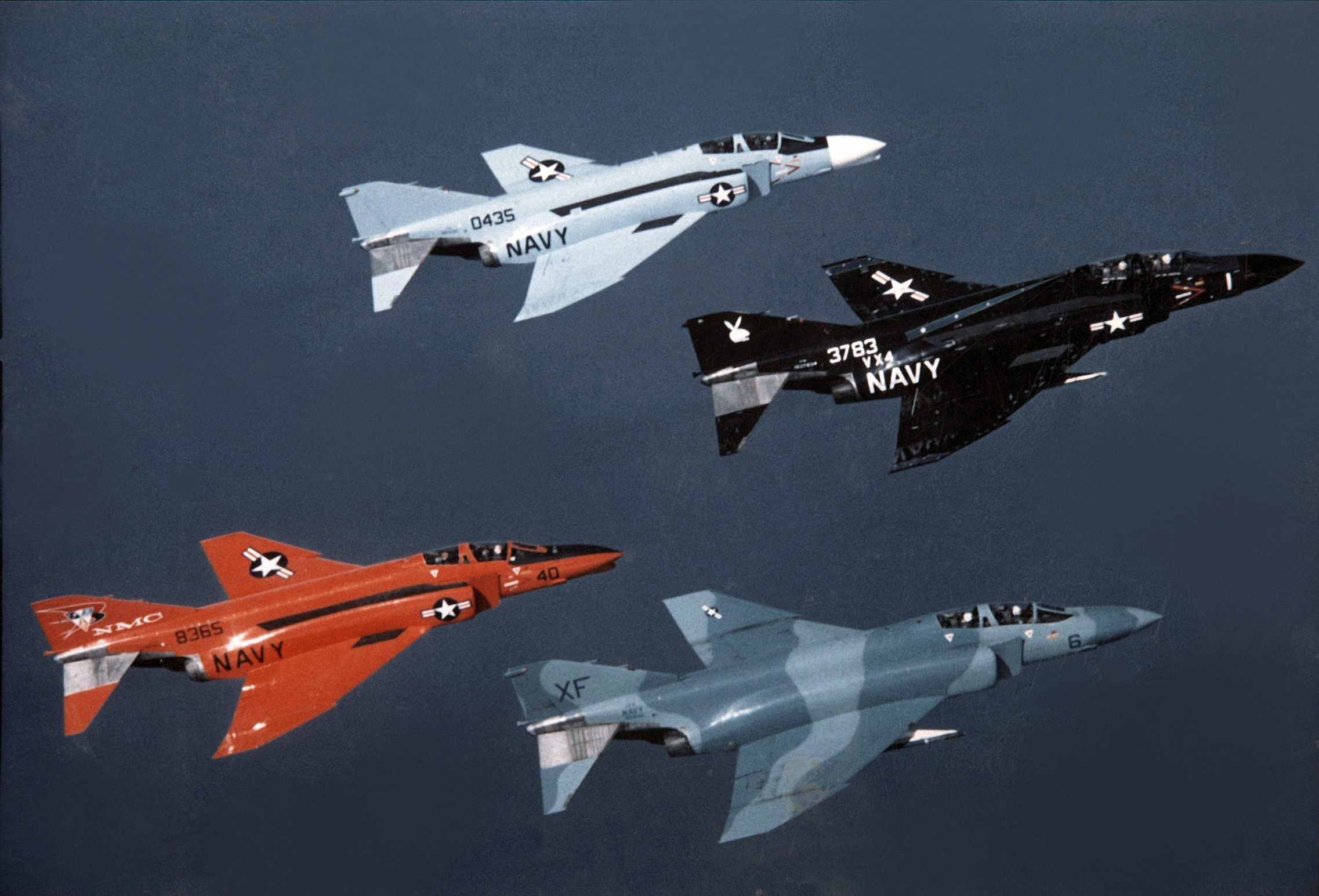
US Navy F-4 Phantoms from China Lake in flight in the 1970s

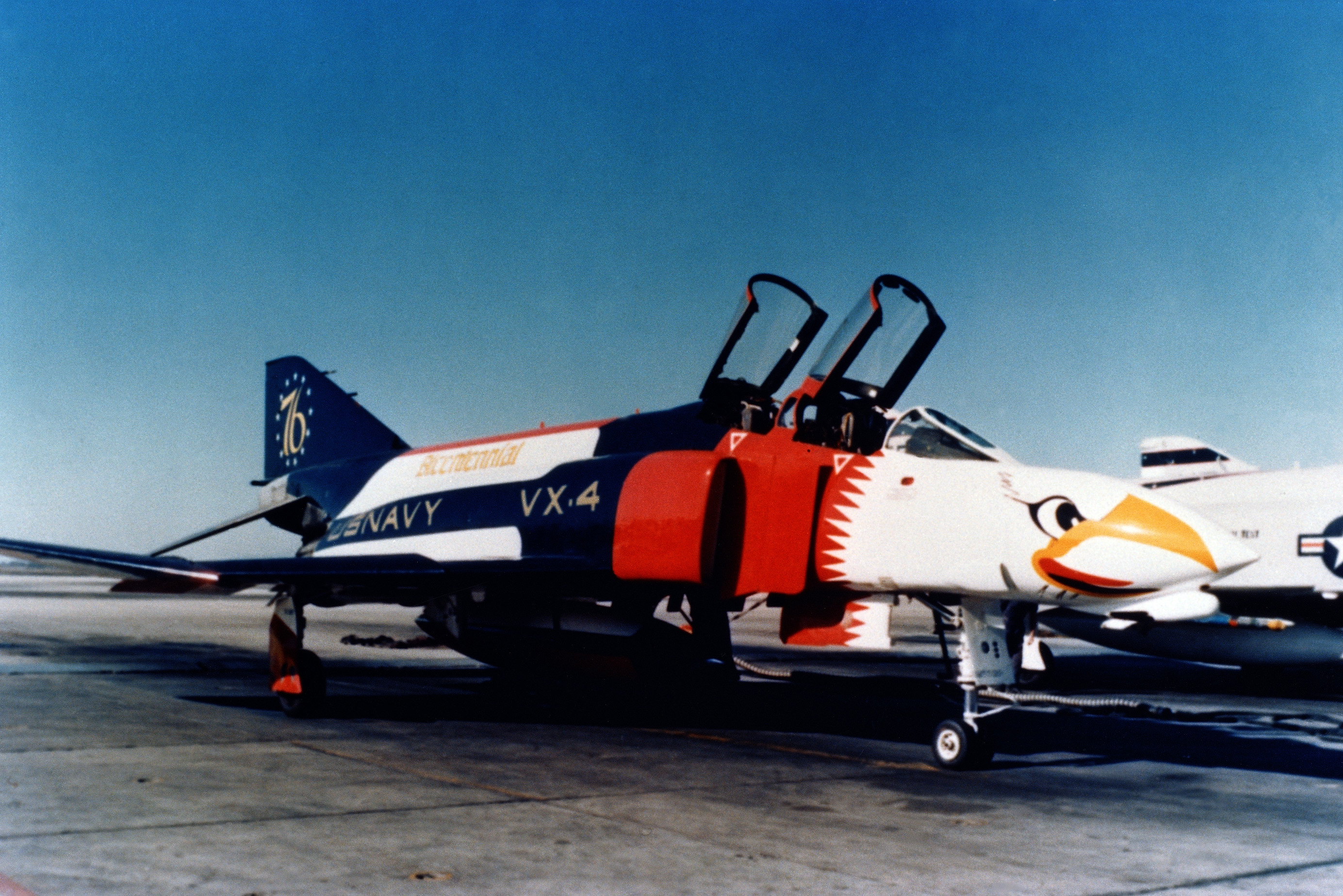
Bicentennial themed YF-4J Phantom II

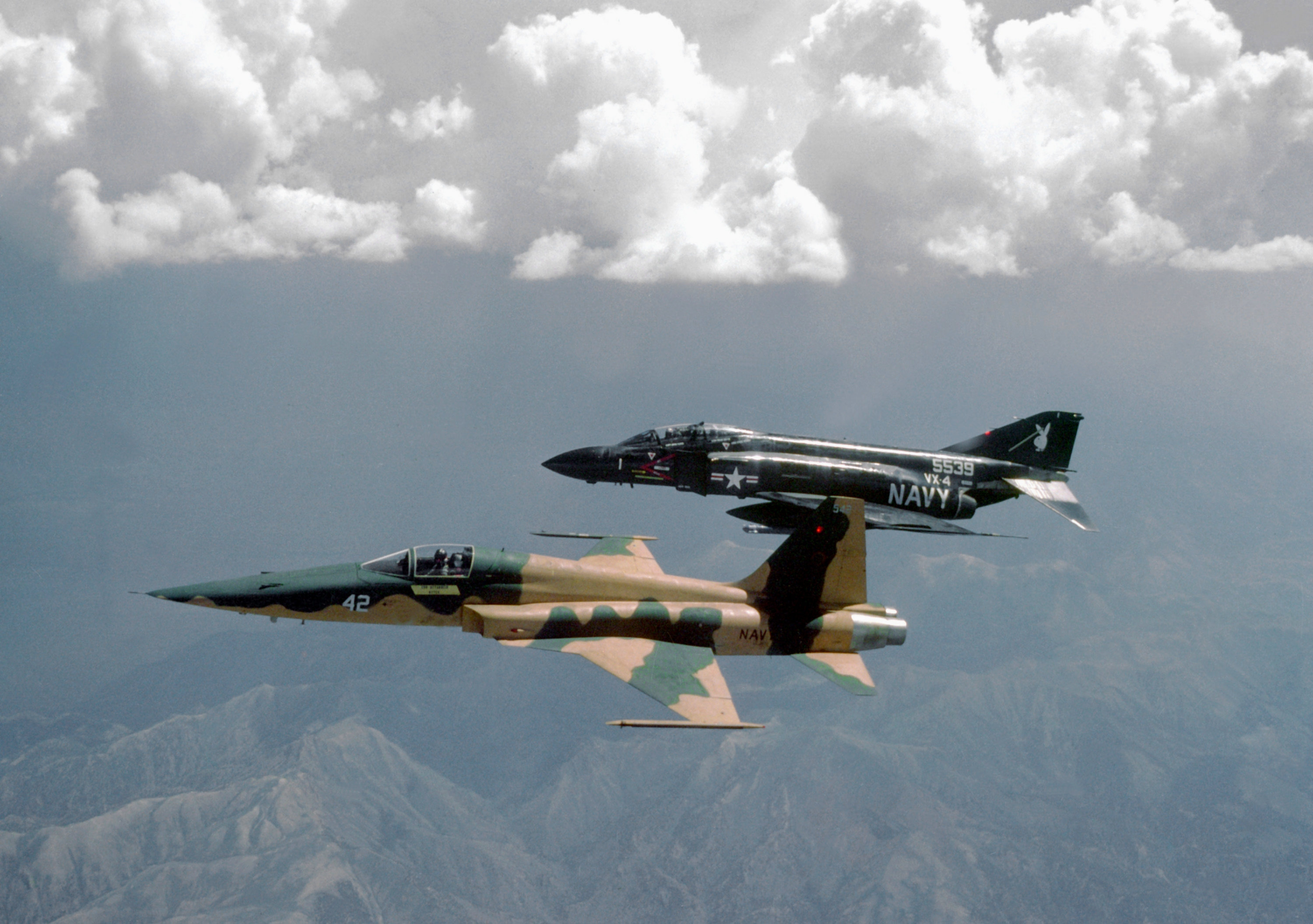
F-5E NFWS in flight with F-4J VX-4 1985

== U.S. Marine Corps ==
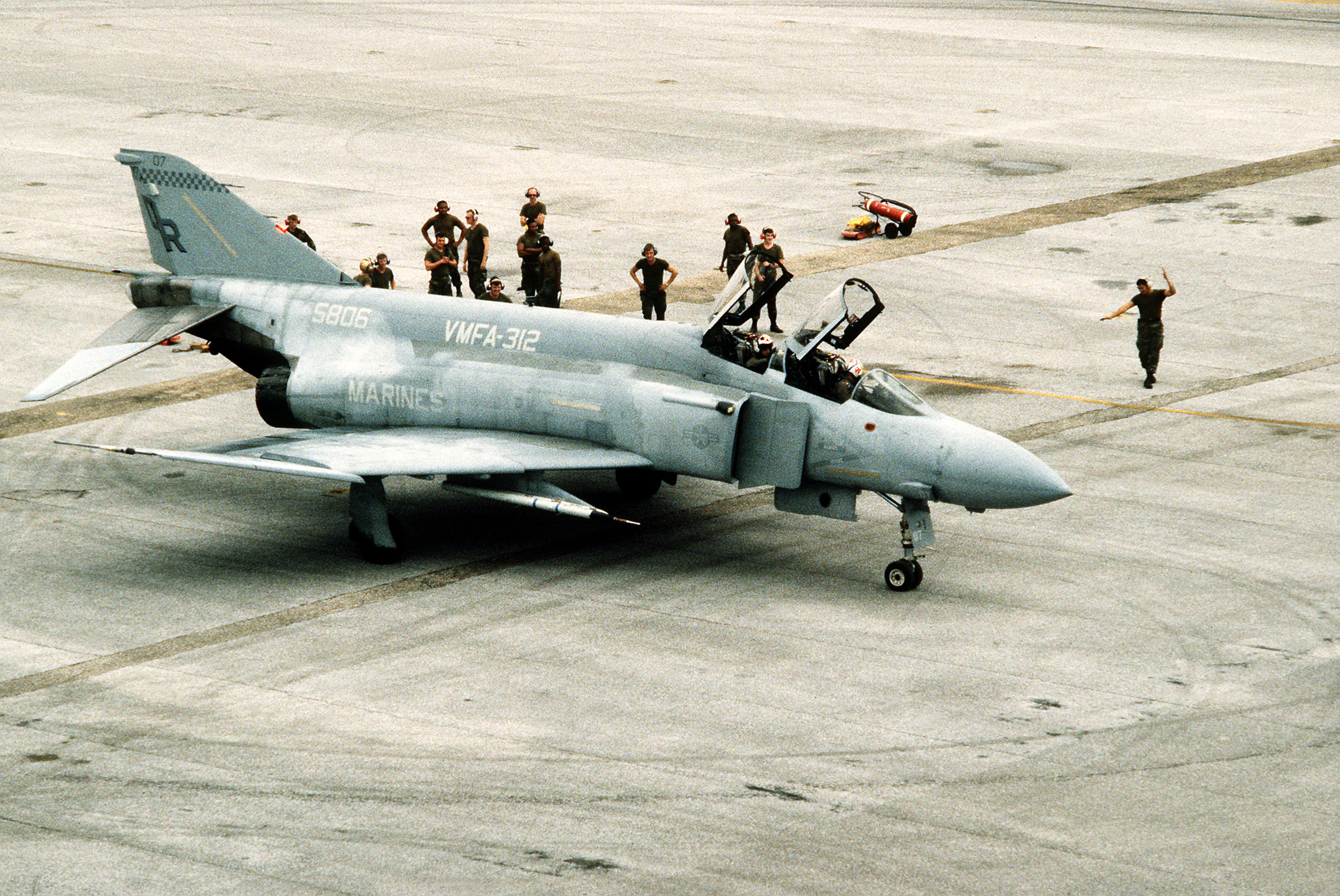
US Marine Corps F-4S

The U.S. Marines received their first F-4Bs in June 1962, with the VMFA-314 Black Knights at MCAS El Toro, California becoming the first operational squadron. In addition to attack variants, the Marines also operated several tactical reconnaissance RF-4Bs. Marine Phantoms from the VMFA-531 Gray Ghosts arrived in Vietnam on 10 April 1965, flying close air support missions from land bases as well as from USS America. Marine F-4 pilots claimed three enemy MiGs (two while on exchange duty with the USAF) at the cost of 75 aircraft lost in combat, mostly to ground fire, and four in accidents. On 18 January 1992, the last Marine Phantom, an F-4S, was retired by VMFA-112 Cowboys.

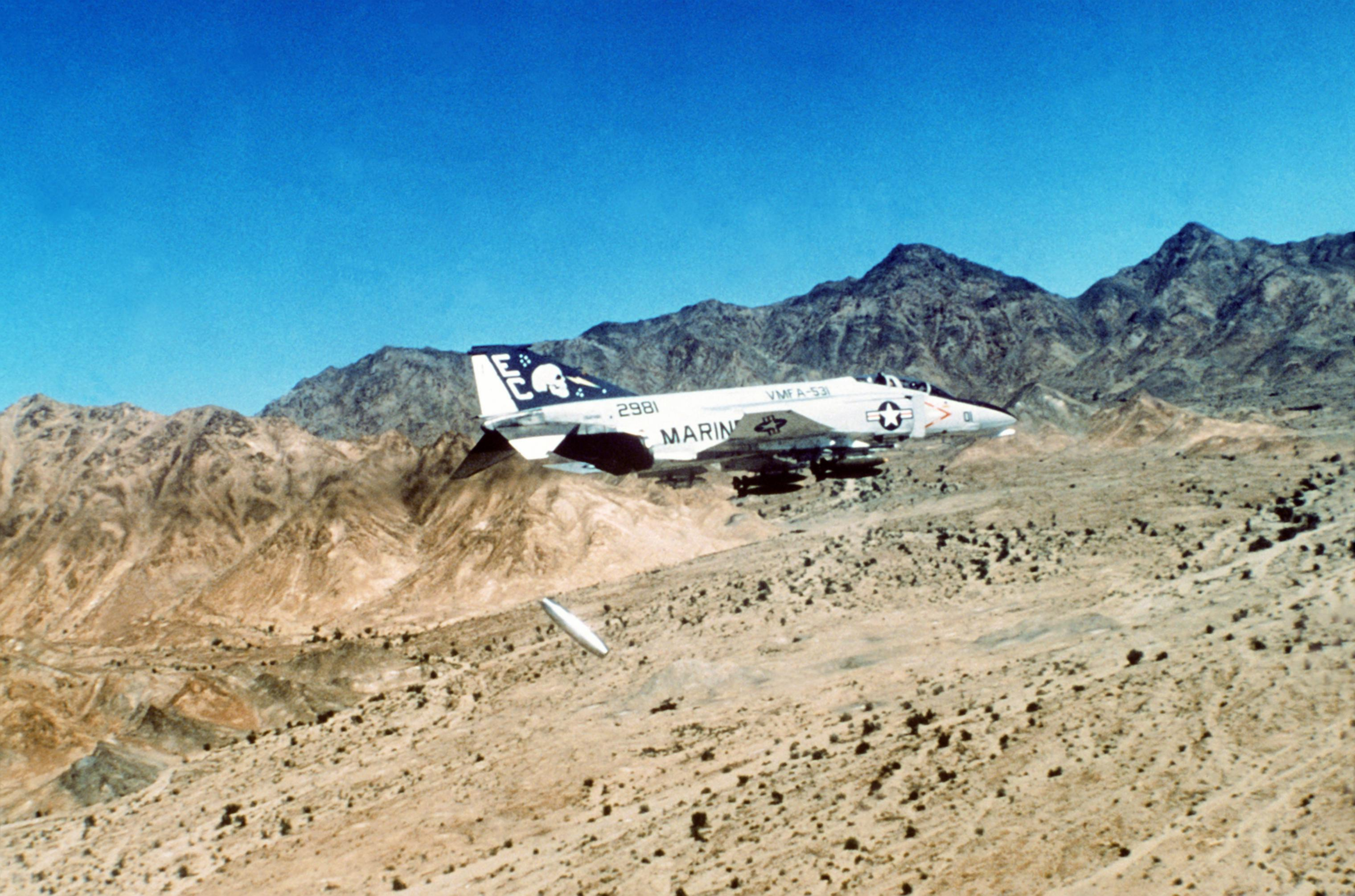
F-4N VMFA-531 dropping napalm 1982

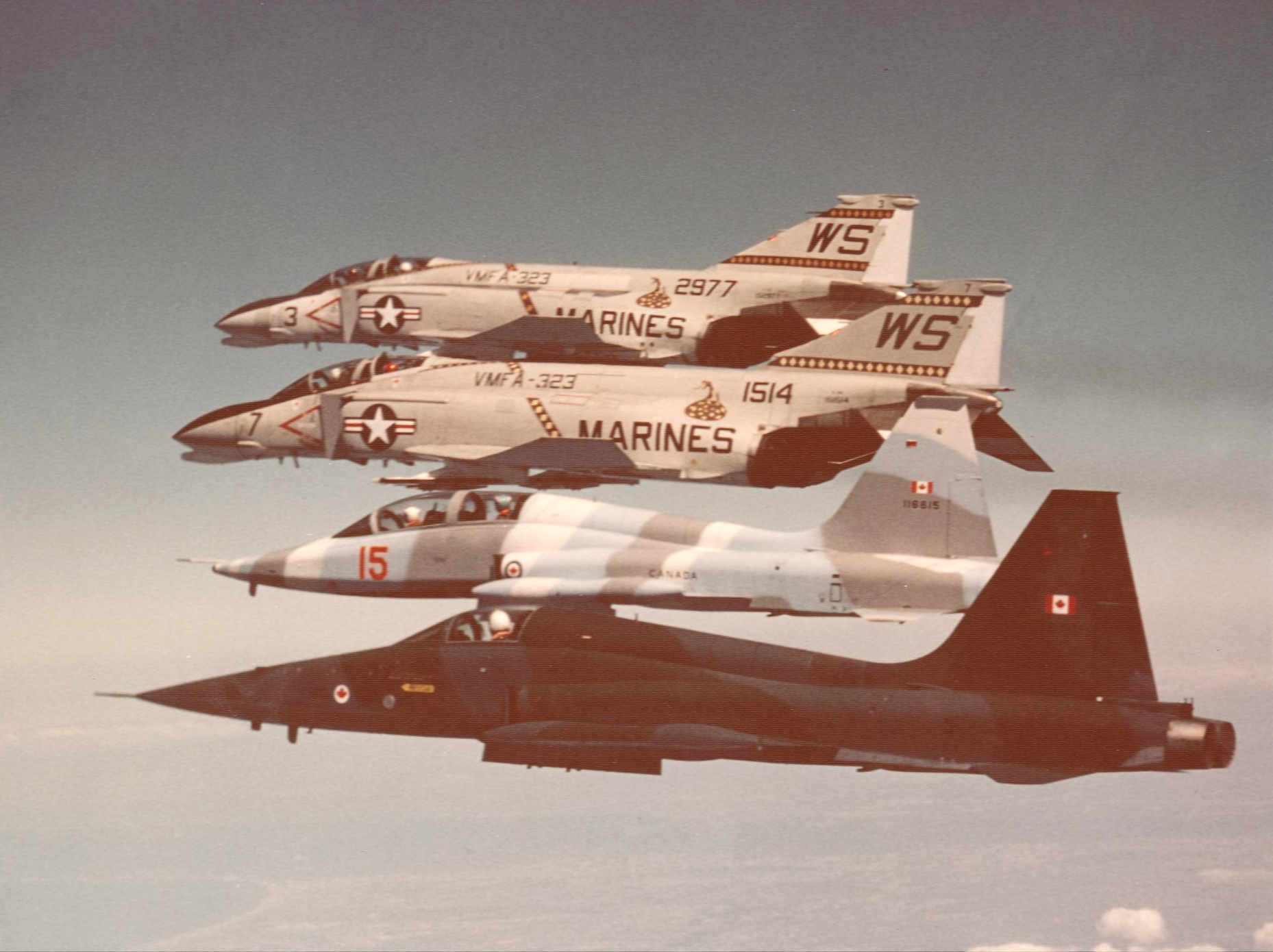
F-4N Phantoms of VFMA-323 in flight with CF-5A and CF-5B 1973

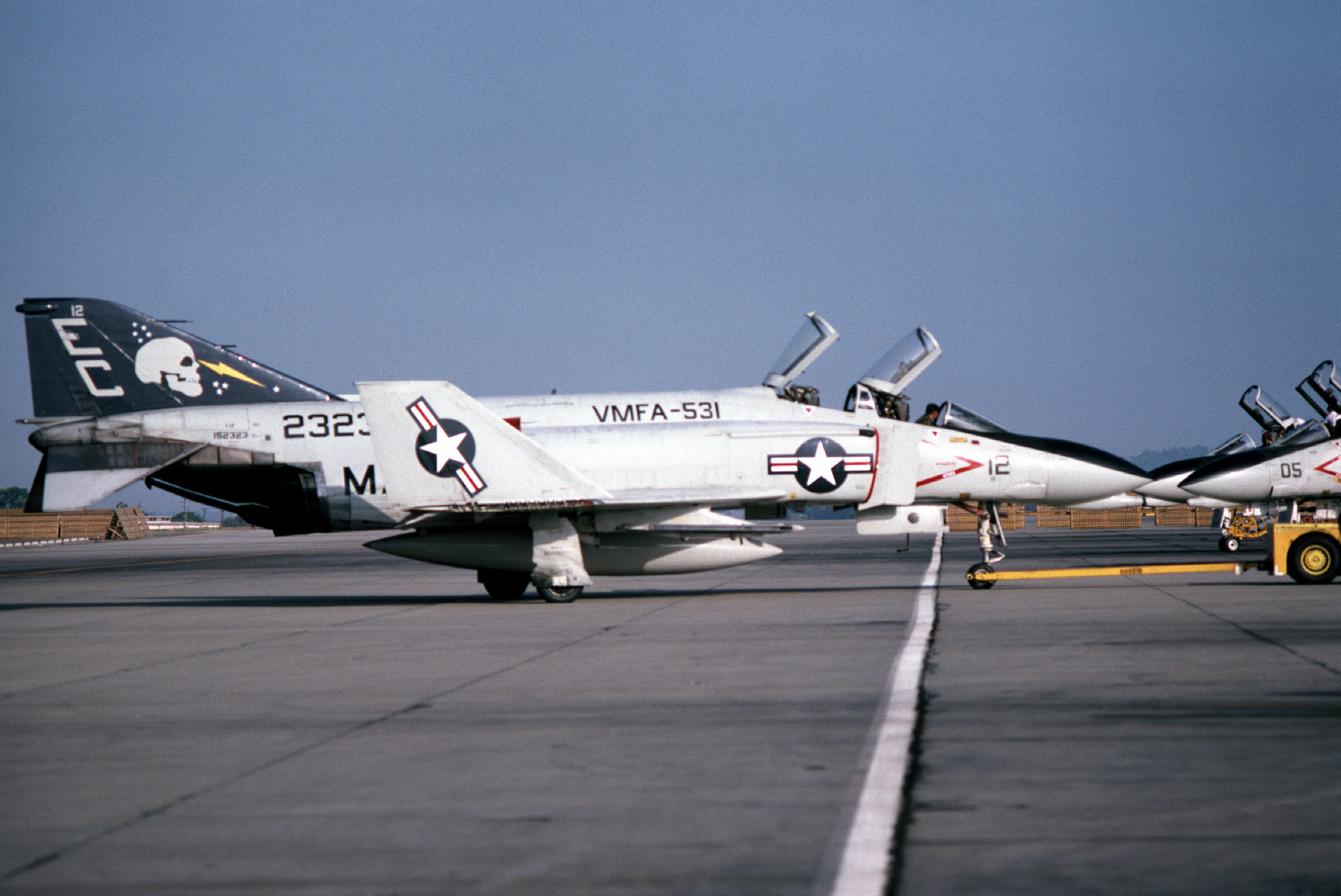
F-4N Phantom VMFA-531 ElToro 1982

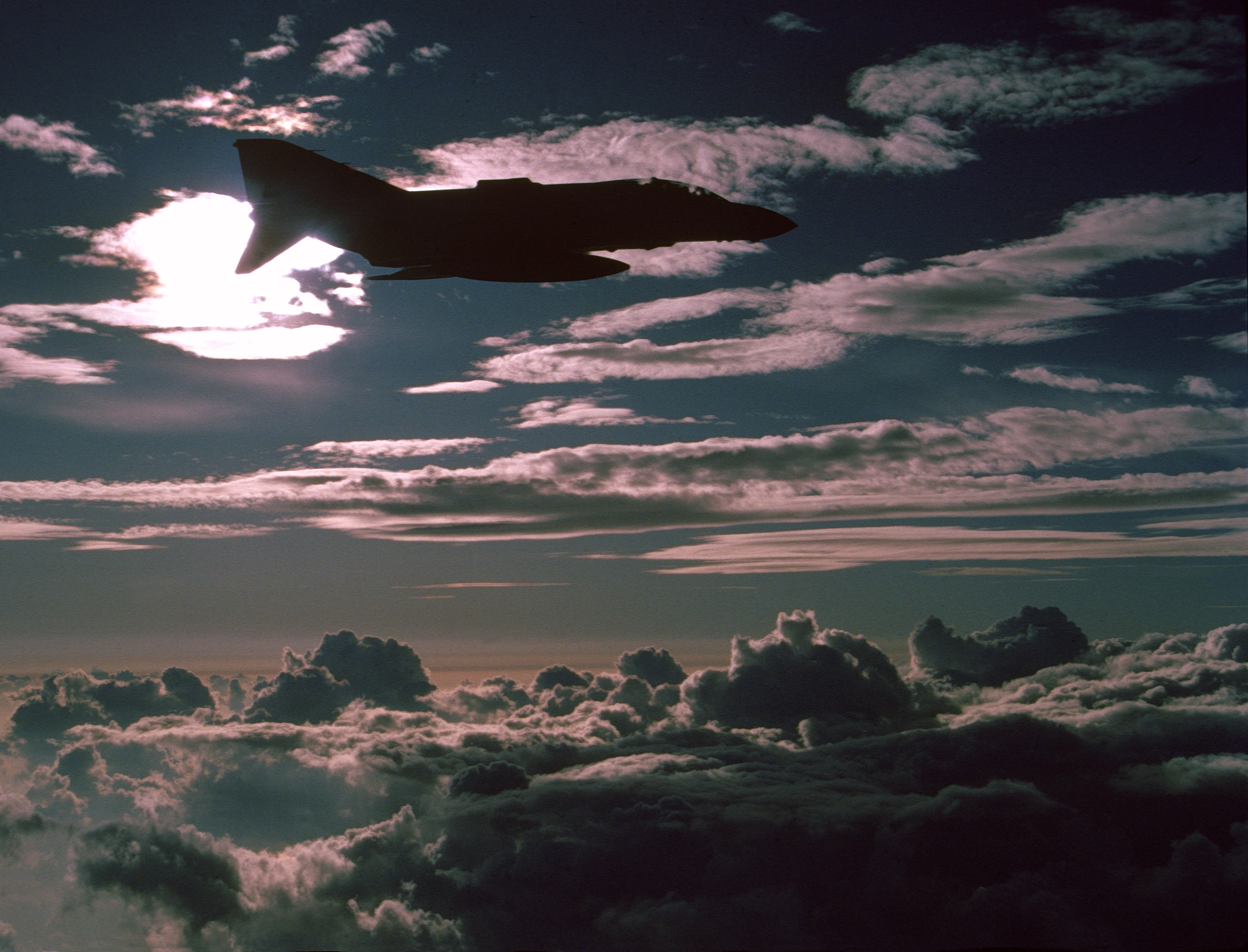
F-4S Phantom II of VMFA-333 in flight in 1985

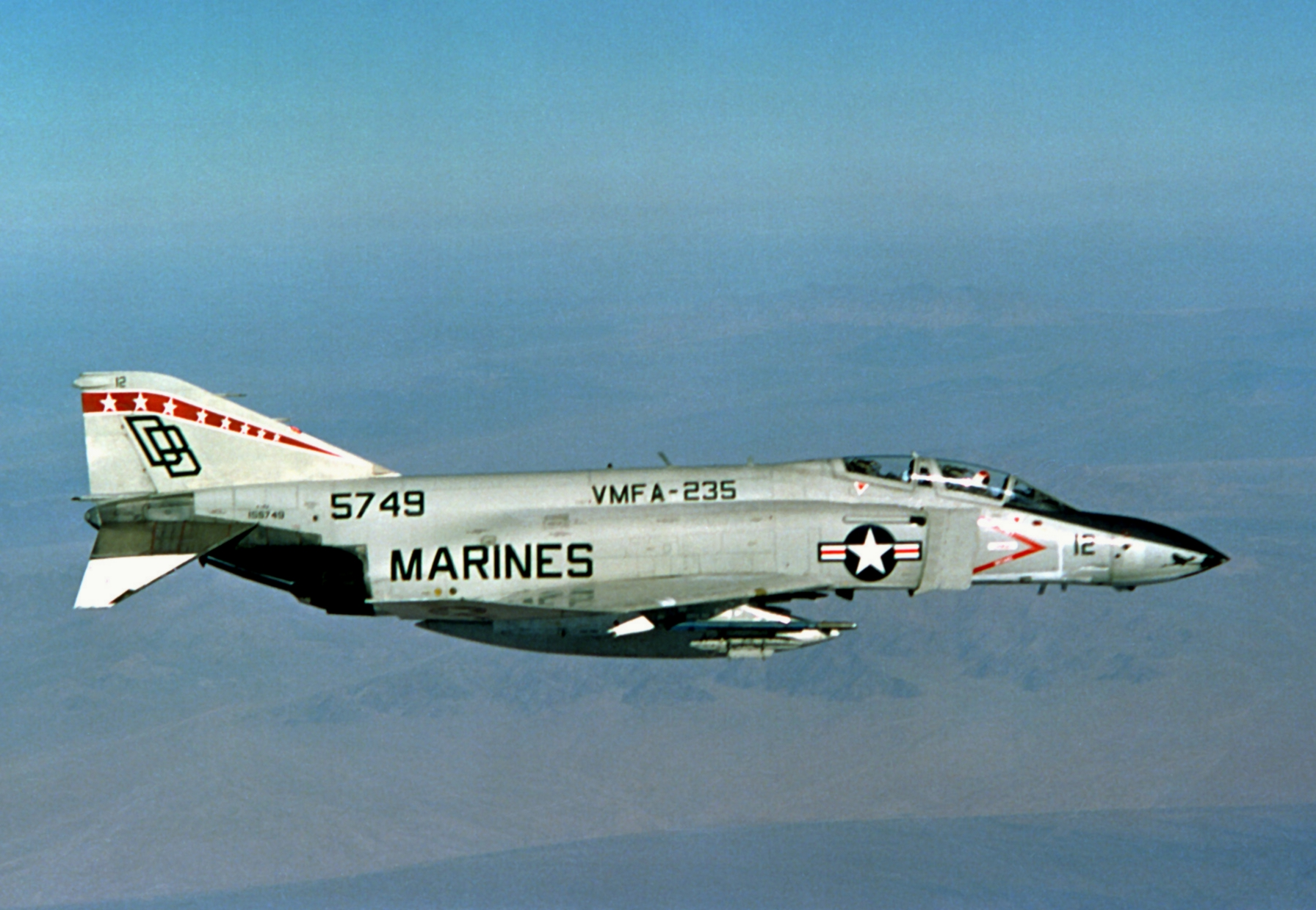
F-4S VMFA-235 in flight 1982

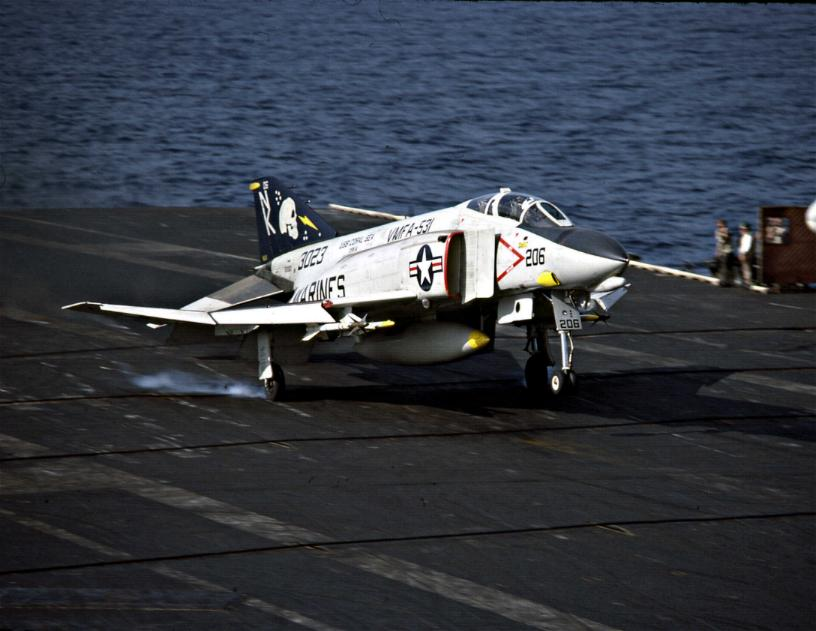
F-4N VMFA-531 CV-43 Apr80

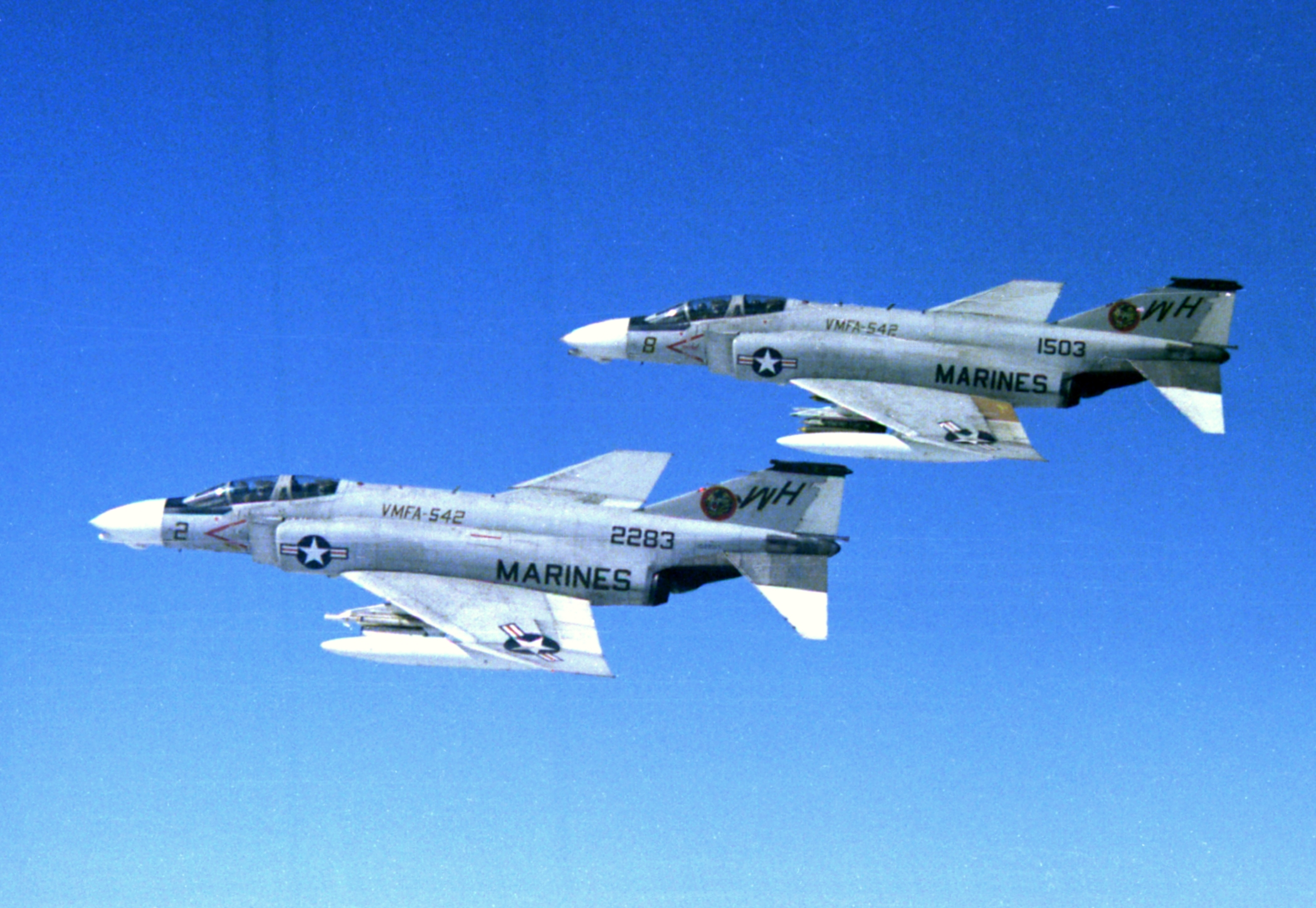
F-4Bs VMFA-542 Vietnam Jan1969

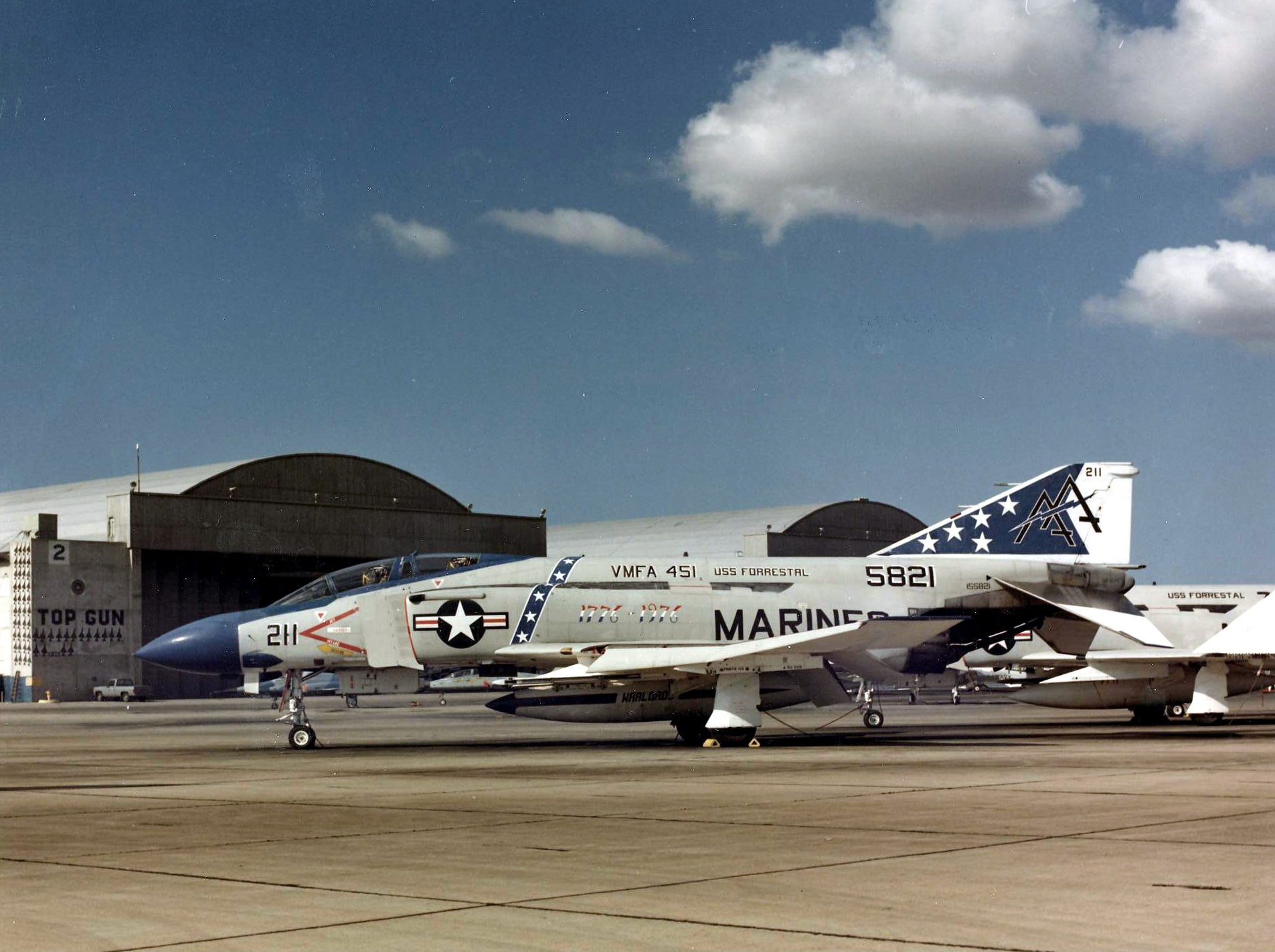
F-4J of VMFA-451 at NAS Miramar in 1976

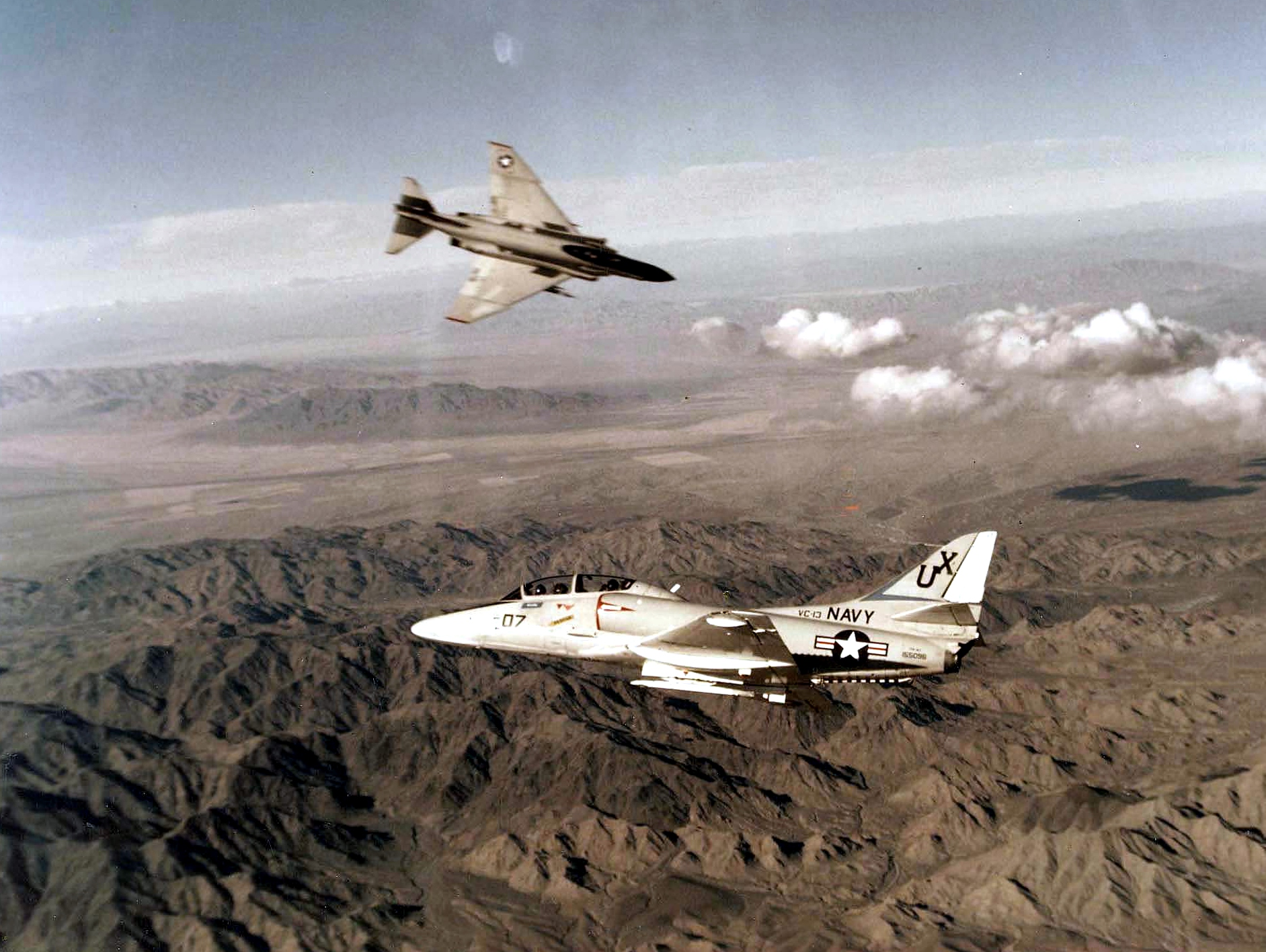
TA-4J Skyhawk and F-4 Phantom during air combat maneuvering 1980

=== Frontline and Reserve ===
- VMFA-112 (MA) - Based at NAS Dallas, Texas (4th Marine Aircraft Wing / Marine Air Reserve)
- VMFA-115 (VE) - Based at MCAS Cherry Point, North Carolina until 1977, then MCAS Beaufort, South Carolina
- VMFA-122 (DC) - Based at MCAS El Toro, California, then MCAS Kaneohe Bay, Hawaii, then MCAS Beaufort, South Carolina
- VMFA-134 (MF) - Based at MCAS El Toro, California (4th Marine Aircraft Wing / Marine Air Reserve)
- VMFA-212 (WD) - Based at MCAS Kaneohe Bay, Hawaii
- VMFA-232 (WT) - Based at MCAS El Toro, California, MCAS Iwakuni Japan, then MCAS Kaneohe Bay, Hawaii
- VMFA-235 (DB) - Based at MCAS Kaneohe Bay, Hawaii
- VMFA-251 (DW) - Based at MCAS Beaufort, South Carolina
- VMFA-312 (DM) - Based at MCAS Beaufort, South Carolina
- VMFA-314 (VW) - Based at MCAS El Toro, California
- VMFA-321 (MG) - Based at Naval Air Facility Washington / Andrews AFB, Maryland (4th Marine Aircraft Wing / Marine Air Reserve)
- VMFA-323 (WS) - Based at MCAS El Toro, California
- VMFA-333 (DN) - Based at MCAS Beaufort, South Carolina
- VMFA-334 (WU) - Based at MCAS El Toro, California
- VMFA-351 (MC) - Based at NAS Atlanta / Dobbins AFB, Georgia (4th Marine Aircraft Wing / Marine Air Reserve)
- VMFA-451 (VM) - Based at MCAS Beaufort, South Carolina
- VMFA-513 (WF) - Based at MCAS El Toro, California, then MCAS Cherry Point, North Carolina
- VMFA-531 (EC) - Based at MCAS Cherry Point, North Carolina, then MCAS El Toro, California
- VMFA-542 (WH) - Based at MCAS El Toro, California
- VMCJ-1 (RM) - Based at MCAS Iwakuni, Japan
- VMCJ-2 (CY) - Based at MCAS Cherry Point, North Carolina
- VMFP-3 (RF) - Based at MCAS El Toro, California (Note: All Marine Corps RF-4B aircraft were consolidated into VMFP-3 in 1975)

NOTE: USMC squadrons shift their tail codes to the appropriate Carrier Air Wing (CVW) tail code when operating aboard aircraft carriers as part of an integrated USN/USMC CVW.

=== Fleet Replacement Training ===
These kind of units are known in Navy and Marine Corps parlance as Replacement Air Groups (RAG) or Fleet Replacement Squadrons (FRS). The purpose of this particular training units was to provide Fleet Marine Force (FMF) squadrons with F-4 Phantom-qualified aircrew and maintenance personnel. During the Vietnam War, they also furnished spare aircraft to replace those lost in combat.

- VMFAT-101 (SH) - Based at MCAS El Toro, California; later transferred to MCAS Yuma, Arizona
- VMFAT-201 - Based at MCAS Cherry Point, North Carolina; consolidated with VMFAT-101 in 1974

== See also ==
- F-4 Phantom II
- McDonnell Douglas F-4 Phantom II non-U.S. operators
- List of McDonnell Douglas F-4 Phantom II variants
