= McDonnell Douglas F-4 Phantom II non-U.S. operators =

Non-U.S. nations that operate(d) the McDonnell Douglas F-4 Phantom II

Phantoms in non-U.S. service
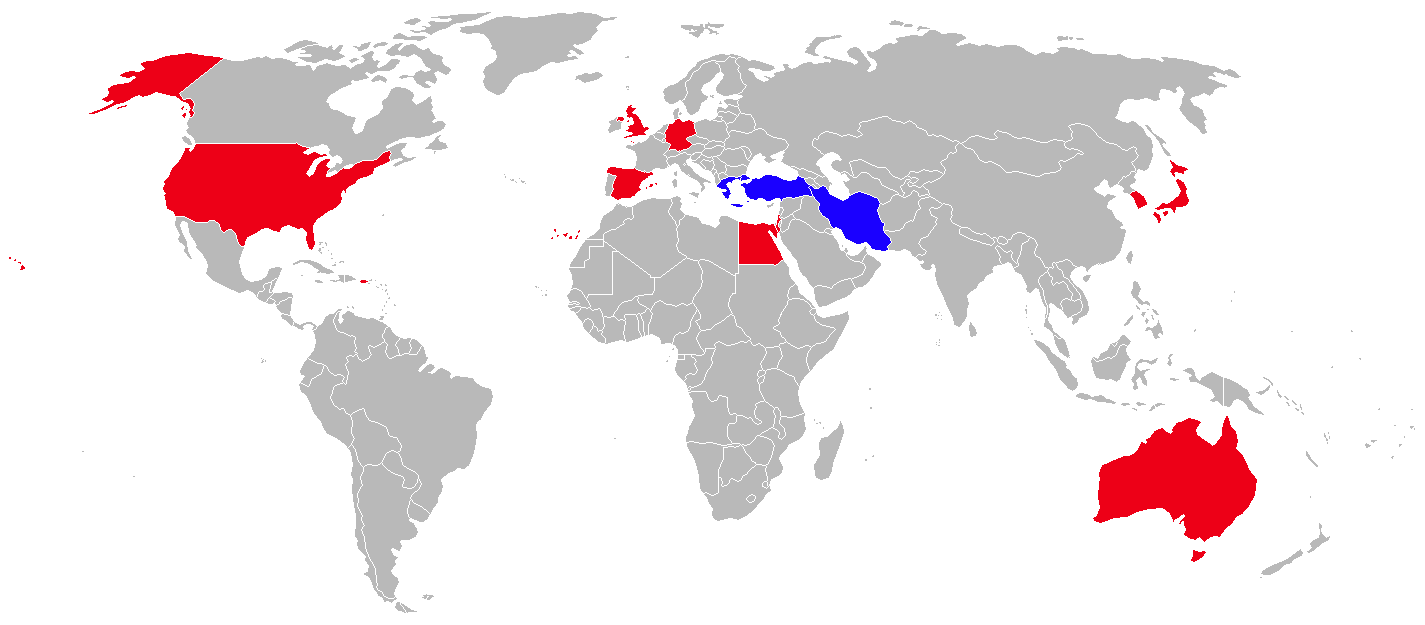
	Received	In service as of 2001	in service as of 2024
Australia	24 F-4E	None (Note: Australia returned the F-4s to U.S. after leasing.)	None
Egypt	45 F-4E	30 F-4E	retired / in reserve
Germany	88 RF-4E; 175 F-4F; 10 F-4E	145 F-4F ICE (Note: Germany upgraded 110 to ICE configuration.)	None
Greece	121 F-4E and RF-4E	62 F-4E AUP and RF-4E (Note: Greece upgraded 39 to Peace Icarus 2000 standard.)	33
Iran	32 F-4D; 177 F-4E; 16 RF-4E	15 F-4D; 29 F-4E; 3 RF-4E	63
Israel	206- 210 F-4E; 12 RF-4E	40 F-4E; 53 F-4E Kurnass 2000	None
Japan	140 F-4EJ; 14 RF-4E	109 F-4EJ Kai; 12 RF-4E	None
South Korea	27 RF-4C; 92 F-4D; 103 F-4E	18 RF-4C; 60 F-4D; 70 F-4E	None
Spain	40 F-4C; 18 RF-4C	14 RF-4C (Note: Spain has employed F-4Cs as spares since 1989)	None
Turkey	237 F-4E and RF-4E	163 F-4E (Note: Turkey upgraded 54 upgraded to Terminator 2020 configuration.); 44 RF-4E	19
United Kingdom	15 F-4J(UK); 50 F-4K; 116 F-4M	None	None

F-4 Phantom II non-U.S. operators are the non-U.S. nations with air forces that operate or used to operate the McDonnell Douglas F-4 Phantom II. The Phantom II entered service with the U.S. military in 1960 and served until 1996. During this time it was the primary interceptor, air superiority fighter and fighter bomber with the U.S. Navy, Marines and Air Force.

The Phantom II was exported to 11 other nations, and continues to serve in a military role in some parts of the world.

== Australia ==
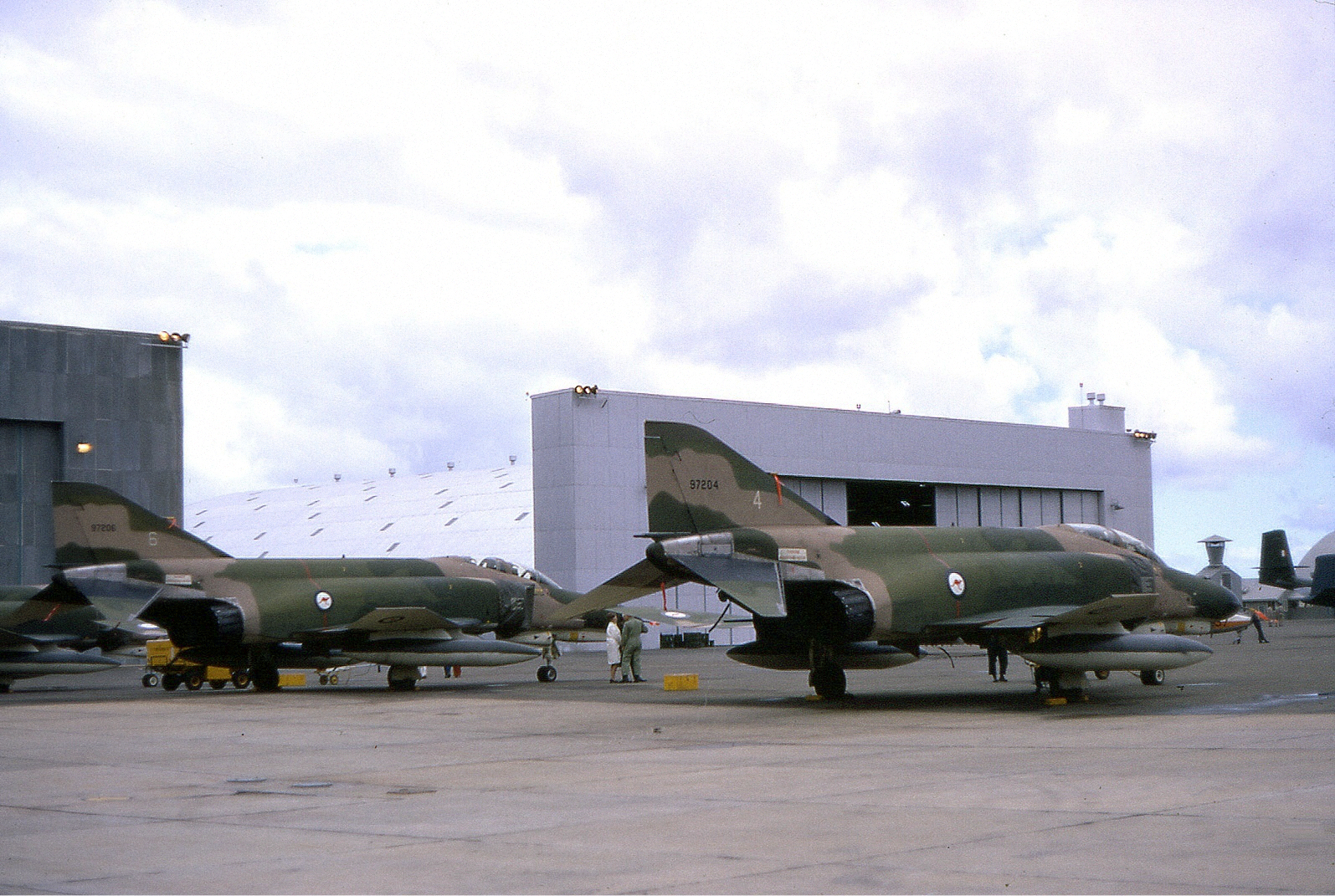
Two RAAF F-4Es at RAAF Base Edinburgh in 1971.

In March 1963, McDonnell Douglas offered to provide the RAAF with a modified version of the F-4C, the model 98DX, fitted with SNECMA Atar 9 engines. This engine was already used in the RAAF's Mirage IIIOs, but the French turbojet was inferior to the General Electric J79, and the RAAF chose instead to order the F-111C Aardvark which had a greater range.

Since the development of the F-111 was plagued with many setbacks, it was expected that the order for the RAAF would not be ready before 1974, leaving the Australian air force short of a suitable aircraft. The need to replace their Canberra B.20s left the RAAF frustrated by the delay in the development of the F-111.

The solution was to loan F-4Es to the RAAF, under the Peace Reef program. On 22 June 1970, the contract was signed, and the first of 24 new F-4Es arrived the following September. They served with Nos. 1 and 6 Squadrons, both based at RAAF Base Amberley. The Australian aircrews praised the choice and the F-4Es were so well received that their popularity threatened the F-111C order at one point. F-4E was proving its value as a fighter for the US in Vietnam and to Israel. It offered air-to-air capabilities that the F-111 could not offer. Australia also had Mirage III fighters which could do the job. In the end what was important for Australia was that the F-111 outperformed any F-4 variant in ground attack missions as it was one of the best attack planes in the world.

The first six aircraft were returned in October 1972, with another five returned in November 1972. The first six F-111Cs were delivered in June 1973, and the rest of the F-4Es were returned to the United States Air Force.

In 1972 the United States offered to sell the leased aircraft to Australia. Earlier, the Americans had offered to sell 48 aircraft, including RF-4Es if the RAAF had cancelled the F-111C. On balance, the F-4 would in theory need to be supported by at least eight Boeing KC-135 Stratotankers to achieve the endurance required in Australian service with in-flight refueling, making the whole package expensive and uneconomical compared to the F-111C with its greater range. Also, acquisition of the Phantom would have required disbanding at least one Mirage III squadron in order to provide the necessary aircrew and meet budget limits (The No. 82 Wing's aircrew were to be converted to the F-111). The F-111C program was resumed in December 1971.

One Phantom (69-7203) was lost in an accident during Australian service, off Evans Head, New South Wales during night bombing practice on 16 June 1971, while the others went on to follow a long career with the United States Air Force, with 21 examples later modified to F-4G Wild Weasel specifications and used by the 35th and 52nd Tactical Fighter Wings (TFWs).

=== Units ===
Royal Australian Air Force

- No. 1 Squadron RAAF
- No. 6 Squadron RAAF

== Egypt ==
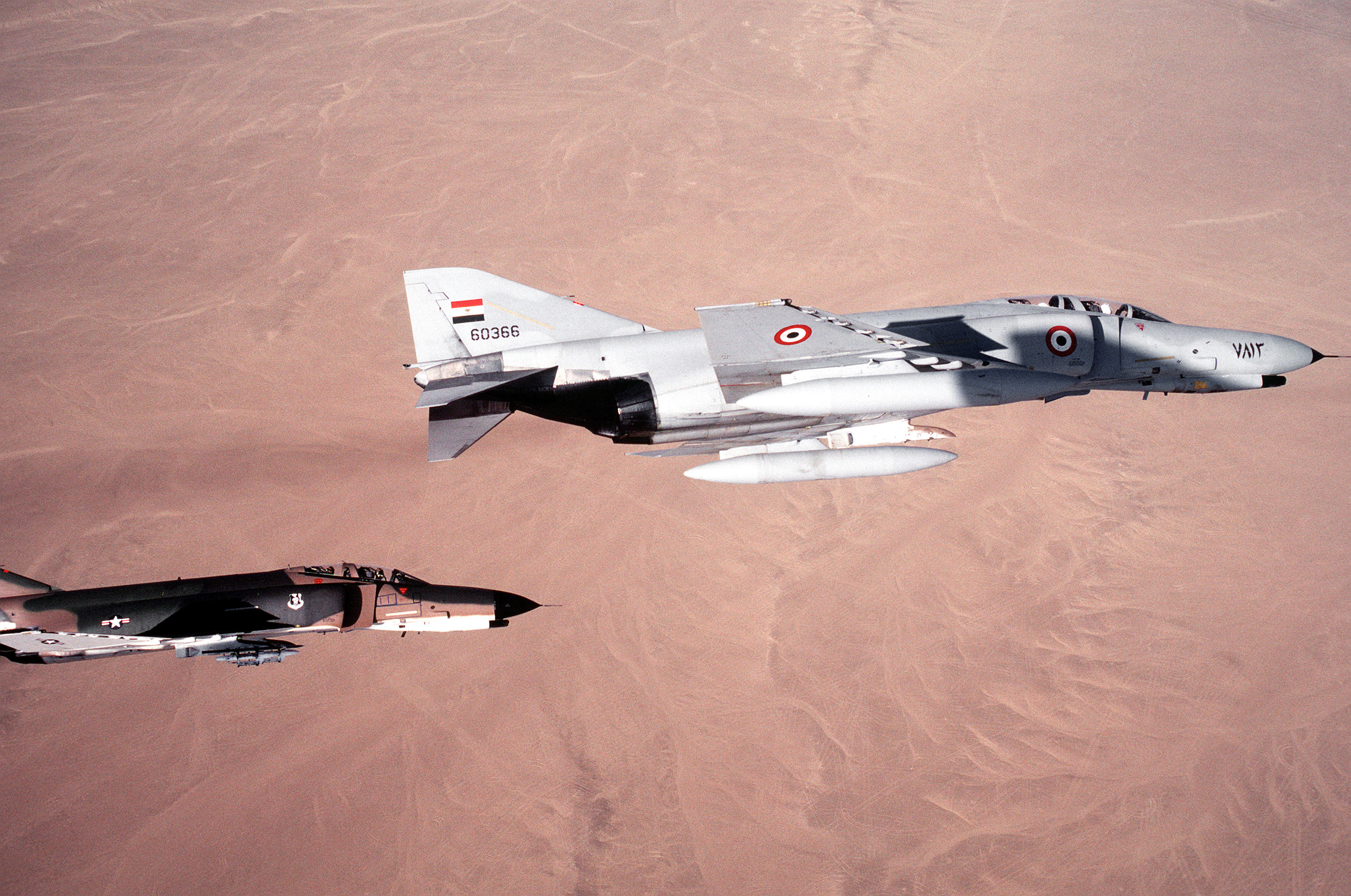
AREAF F-4E Phantom II

The Al Quwwat al Jawwiya il Misriya (Egyptian Air Force or EAF) encountered Israeli F-4s during fighting between the two states, especially during the later stages of the War of Attrition and the 1973 Yom Kippur War. These encounters gave the EAF a measure of the type's effectiveness, especially as a bomber.

After the Camp David Accords, and the Egypt–Israel peace treaty signed on 26 March 1979, Egypt ended its military dependence on the Soviet Union. It also lost the financial support of the other Arab states, and Saudi Arabia cancelled its plans to send Egypt 50 F-5s. The U.S. State Department proposed trading Egypt new military hardware in exchange for military aircraft made in the USSR, including MiG-21s, and the newer MiG-23s delivered to them by the Soviets prior to their breakdown of relations in 1976.

Under the September 1977 Peace Pharaoh agreement, 35 ex-31 TFW F-4Es along with a number of Sparrow, Sidewinder and Maverick missiles were supplied to the EAF for US$594 million and served with 76 and 78 Squadrons of the 222 Fighter Regiment. Initially, Egyptian ground crews found their maintenance far more complex than required for Soviet aircraft and consequently there was an average of only nine F-4s serviceable during 1982, a 26% serviceability rate. To correct the situation, Egypt considered selling some of the F-4s to Turkey and buying extra General Dynamics F-16 Fighting Falcons. However, assistance from U.S. advisors in 1985 made it possible to reach a reasonable serviceability rate, and in 1988 another seven F-4s were delivered. While further purchases of F-4s and upgrades were considered, these plans were rejected in favour of additional orders for F-16s.

By the end of the 1990s, three aircraft had crashed but were replaced with three others. As of 2018 the two squadrons of F-4s are retired and are in storage/reserve.

=== Units ===
Egyptian Air Force

- 222nd TFB (Wing) (Cairo West Air Base)
  - 76th Squadron
  - 78th Squadron

== Germany ==
Footage of an F-4 belonging to the Bundeswehr Technical and Airworthiness Center during a flight.

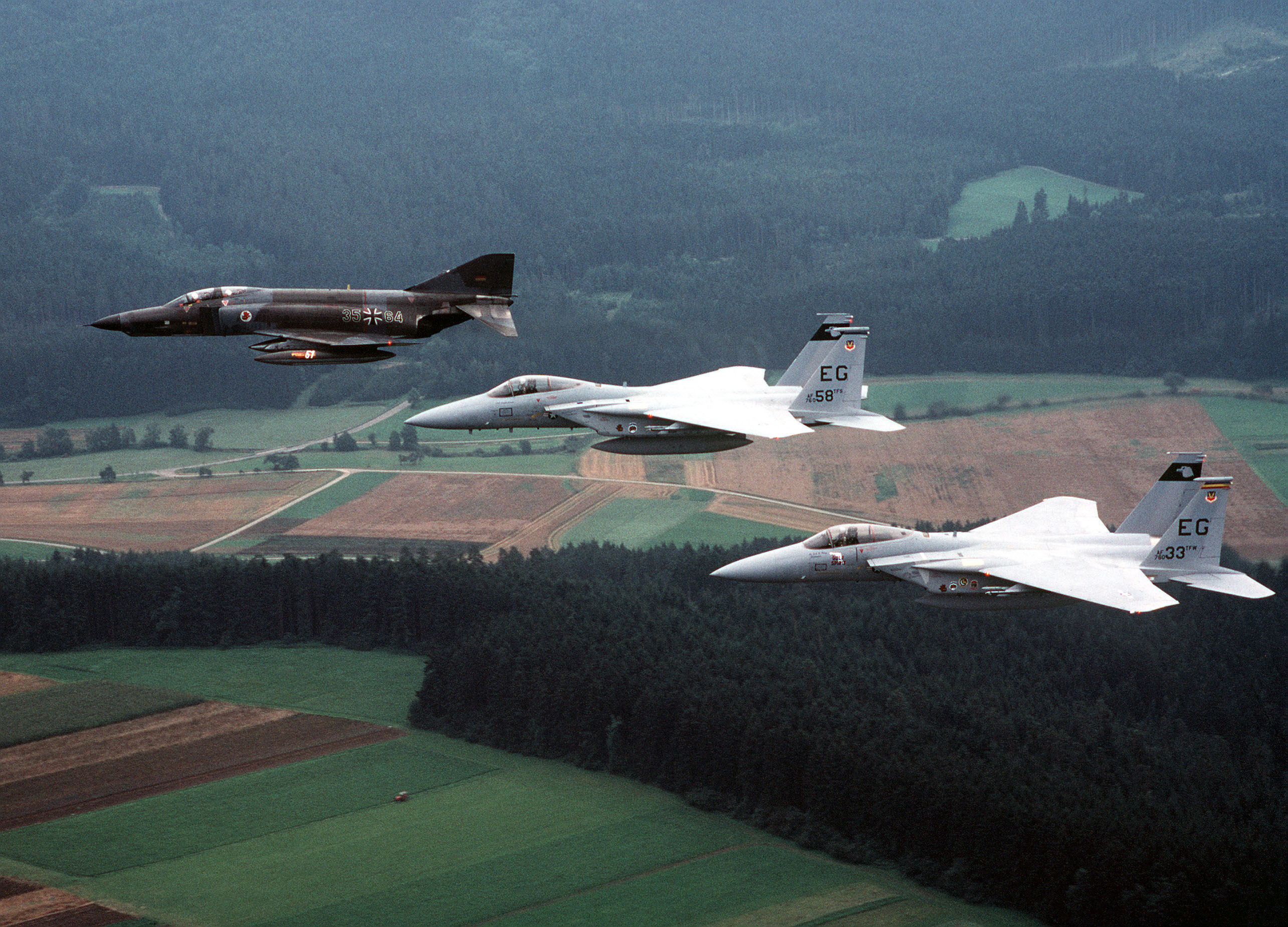
A West German RF-4E with two USAF F-15As, in 1982.

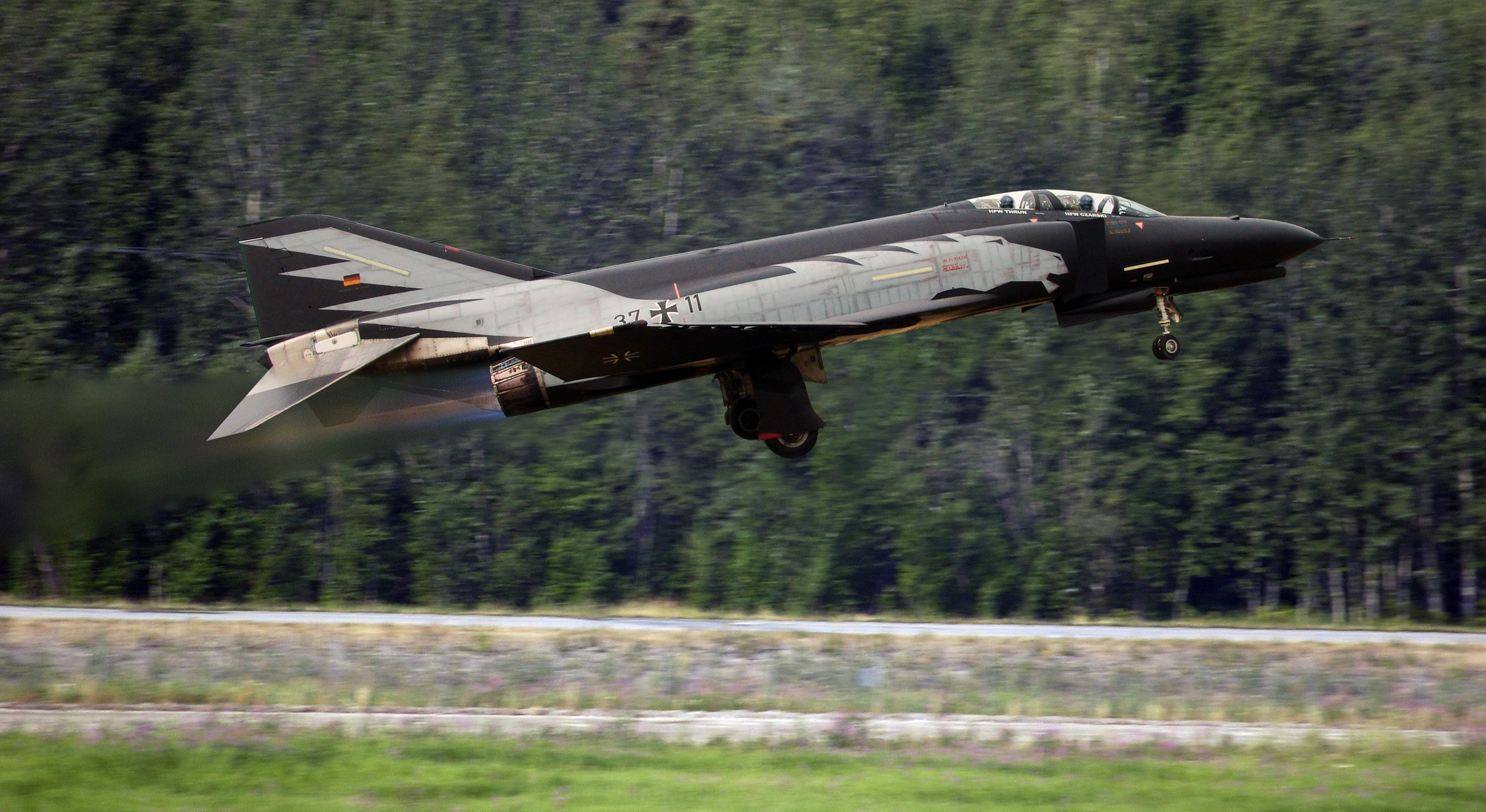
An F-4F from Jagdgeschwader 72.

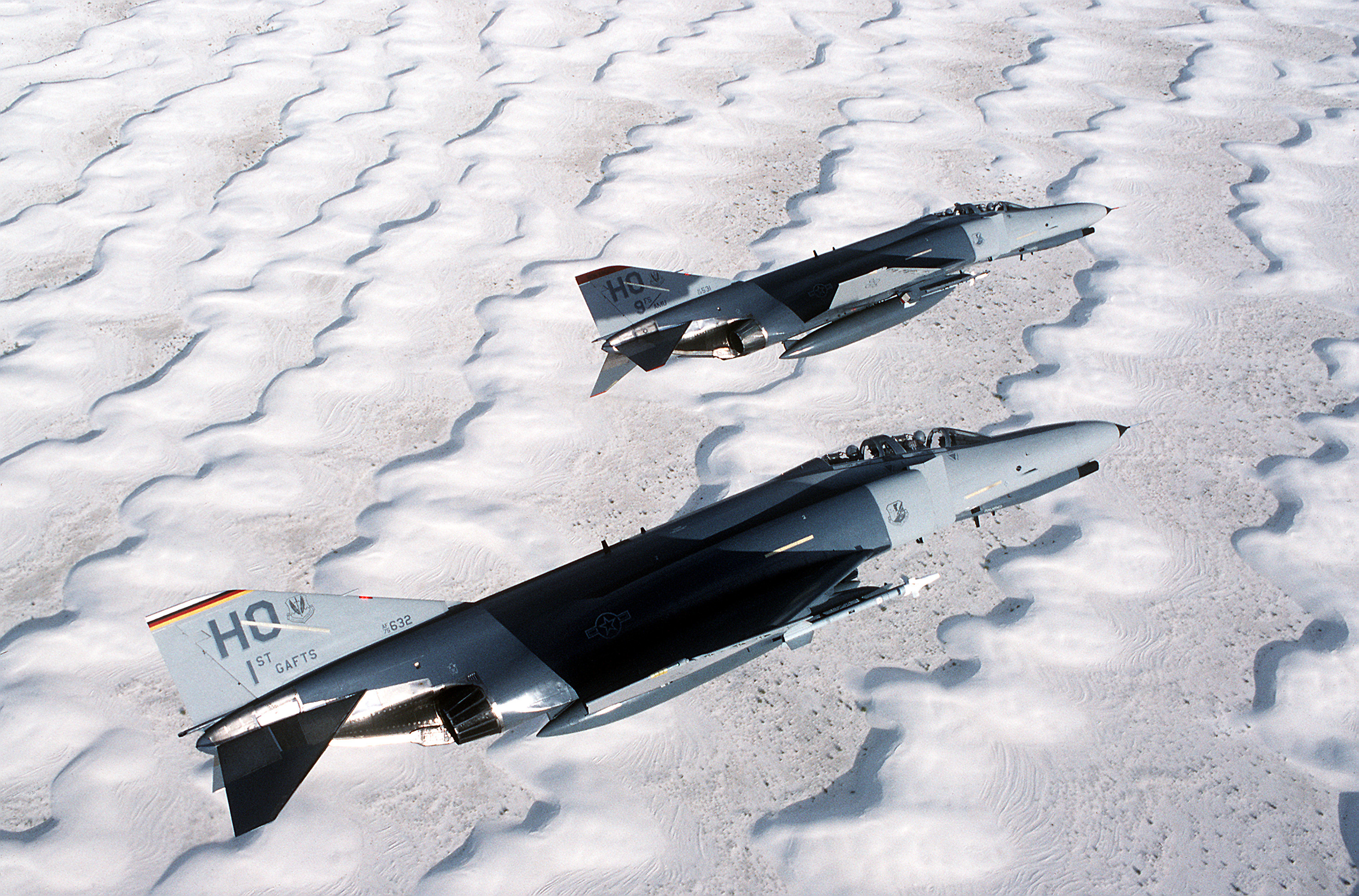
A pair of Luftwaffe F-4Es during a training flight over Holloman Air Force Base, 1992.

The German Luftwaffe was the 3rd largest operator of exported Phantoms, (Behind Iran and Israel) operating around 175 F-4Fs, 10 F-4Es for training purposes and 88 RF-4Es from its introduction into service until the aircraft's retirement in 2013.

At the start of the 1960s, NATO began to gradually abandon its 1950s era-policy against the Soviet Union from "massive retaliation" in case of a nuclear war, to adopting a more strategic concept of a "flexible response". As a result, the Luftwaffe were forced to increase their conventional capabilities, which meant the need to replace their fleet of Lockheed F-104 Starfighters in the reconnaissance and air superiority roles.

In 1968, the Luftwaffe signed a deal with McDonnell Douglas to purchase 88 RF-4Es, which was at the time the largest order for Phantoms outside the United States Air Force. The contract also included several industrial offsets for the German industry, particularly production work for Messerschmitt-Bölkow-Blohm who manufactured and supplied F-4 components to McDonnell Douglas' Phantom production facility in St. Louis.

On 16 January 1971, the first RF-4E, dubbed the "Spirit of St. Louis", flew from the United States, with a stopover in Spain, and finally into West Germany. The next day, at Bremgarten Airfield, the aircraft was officially accepted into service by the Commander of the Luftwaffe, Gunther Rall.

The West German RF-4E was equipped similarly to the RF-4Cs in service at the time with the USAF, using the latest F-4E airframe and more-powerful engines. The RF-4Es were employed as a day/night reconnaissance aircraft, equipped with four cameras with the ability to cover 180 degrees. There were special flares for night use and two night/all-weather reconnaissance systems. One was the IRRS (Infrared Recognition System) and the other was the SLAR (Side-Looking Airborne Radar), mounted in the side of the fuselage. The aircraft had the capability to develop photos in flight and then drop them using special cartridges. Missions were generally flown at low level and high speed, using the installed APQ-99 radar for navigation. Deliveries were completed in May 1972 and the previously employed RF-104Gs were modified to serve in strike or fighter units.

The Luftwaffe also intended to equip two fighter and two bomber wings with a simplified single-seat version of the F-4E which had already been proposed for the TFX Program introduced in 1962. This was reconsidered due to the cost of that version and instead, under the Peace Rhine program, the Luftwaffe purchased the F-4F, which was based on the F-4E.

The F-4F had one of the seven fuselage fuel tanks omitted along with the capability to carry AIM-7 Sparrow missiles and bombs. It was equipped with air combat maneuvering leading edge slats and had a higher thrust to weight ratio, approaching 1:1 when fuel was low. The first example, serial number 3701, first flew on 18 March 1973. The first eight were sent to George AFB where crew training was carried out. In 1976, these trainers were replaced with 10 F-4Es, which stayed in the U.S. One of the "F"s, serial number 72-118, remained at Eglin AFB as an experimental project aircraft.

Units equipped with the F-4F included Jagdgeschwader 71 based in Wittmund and Jagdgeschwader 74 in Neuburg an der Donau. In April 1975, deliveries started to JaboG 36, and finally JaboG 35 at Pferdsfeld. Operationally, the F-4Fs used by JG-71 and JG-74 were employed in the air-to-air role, while those used by the former JaboG 35 and 36 units were used in air-to-air and air-to-ground roles.

Weapons used on the F-4F included the Mk 82 unguided bomb, BL755 cluster bomb unit and AIM-9 Sidewinders. Later on, the capability to use the AGM-65 Maverick was added, with a pair of missiles housed in a single launcher.

=== RF-4E upgrades and disposal ===
Reconnaissance Phantom updates were carried out during several separate programs. Under the Peace Trout program, one RF-4E upgrade had an ELINT system installed in the nose, based on the APR-39 of the F-4G. Another RF-4E update was the installation of provision for bombs with up to six BL-755, or 5,000 lb (2,268 kg) of other external stores, and an ALE-40 chaff launcher along with a bombing system and newer cameras. In 1988, the aircraft were stood down from this dual role due to cost and this capability was removed.

After the reduction of conventional forces in Europe, the Luftwaffe began phasing out the RF-4Es in 1993 and 1994. The surplus aircraft were supplied to Allied NATO nations, with 32 sent to Turkey and 20 to Greece. AG 51 received Panavia Tornados as a replacement, while AG 52 was disbanded.

=== F-4F upgrades and disposal ===
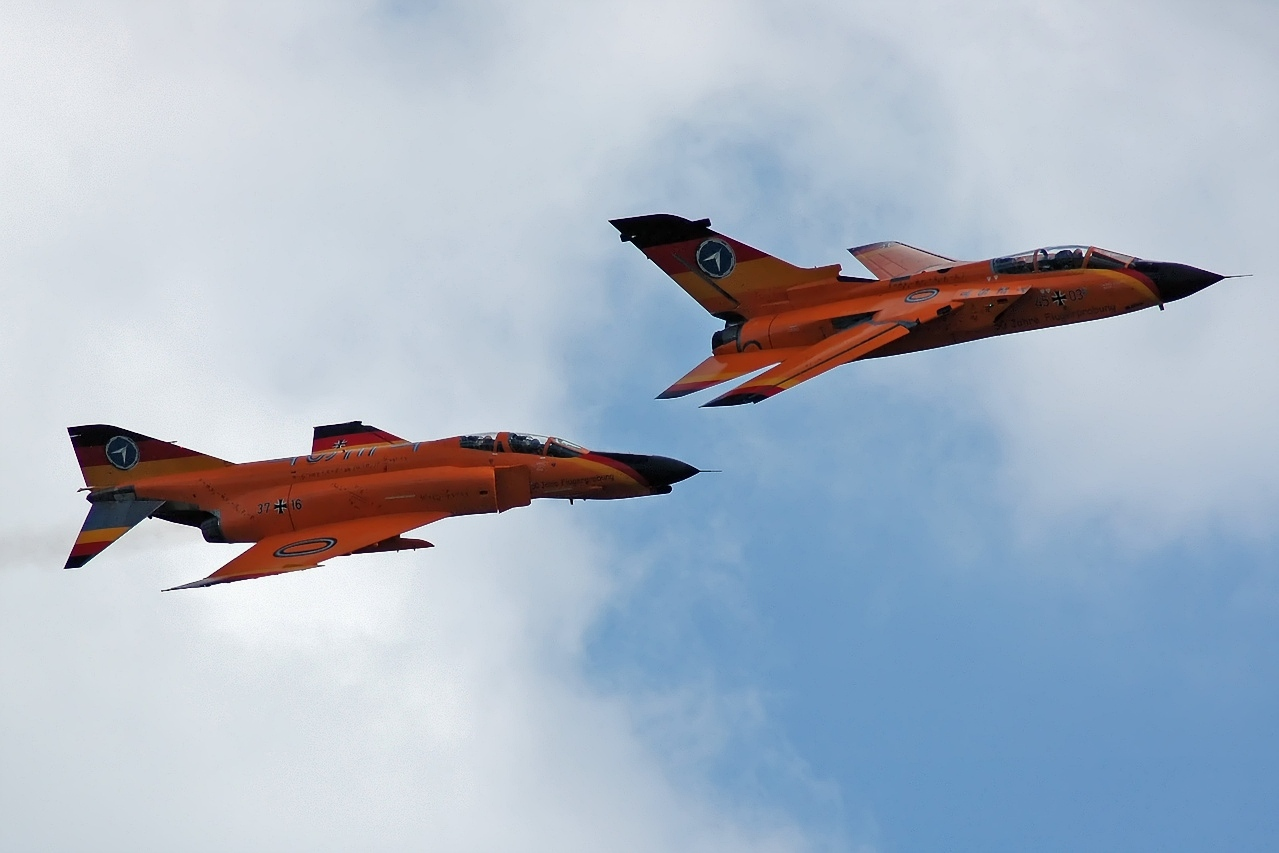
A Luftwaffe F-4F with a Luftwaffe Panavia Tornado.

A total of 12 F-4Fs were initially modified for dual controls and were later de-modified. In 1980–83, the F-4F fleet was fitted with air-refueling probes, utilizing USAF tankers to make longer flights to Canada and Spain. The AIM-9B and F were replaced with the "L" version Sidewinder.

The "ICE" (Improved Combat Efficiency) program commenced in 1983 to upgrade the F-4F's air-to-air capabilities. This involved the APG-65 radar and AIM-120 AMRAAM as the main elements, along with many minor upgrades. The original plan was to upgrade 75 F-4Fs, but the number was increased to 110 in the late 1980s. Initially, the ICE upgrades were intended only for the interceptor wings, but more were upgraded due to delays in the Eurofighter Typhoon program.

Phase 1 of ICE commenced in 1989–90 and included upgrades such as the ALR-68 Radar warning receiver, the Honeywell H-423 laser gyro inertial navigation system, the GEC Avionics CPU-143/A digital central air data computer, and the Mil Std 1553R digital data bus.

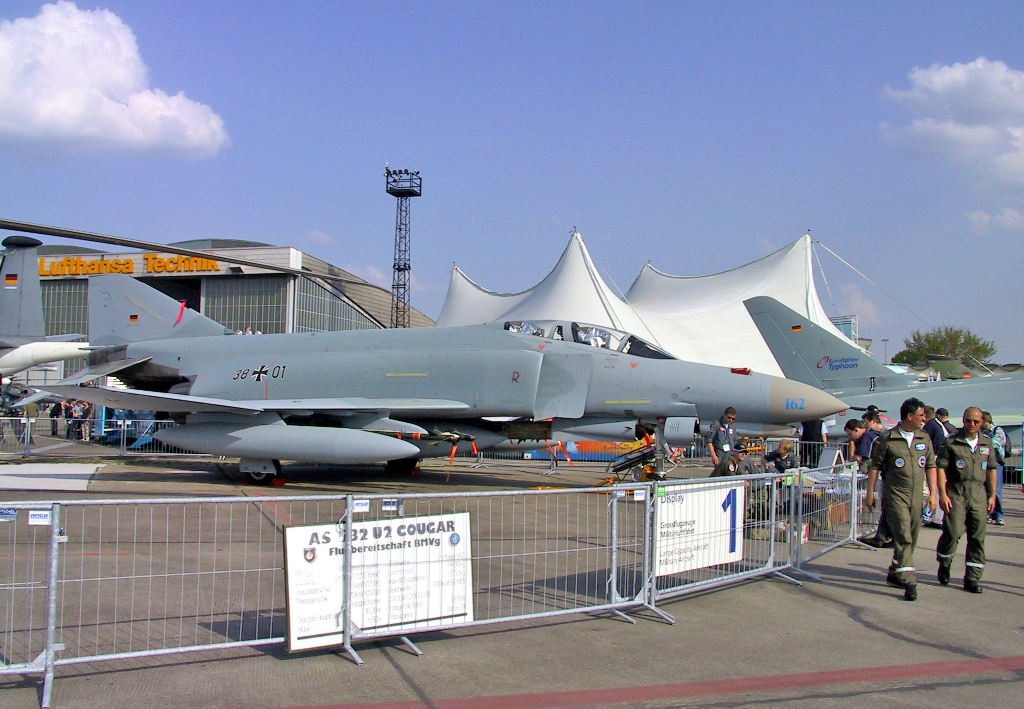
A Luftwaffe F-4 ICE on display.

In July 1989, the first F-4F ICE Phase 2 aircraft was completed, and on 22 November 1991 the first firing of an AIM-120 AMRAAM took place. In 1992, the first batch of six upgraded aircraft was delivered to JG 71 (Fighter Wing 71), but the AIM-120 AMRAAM missiles were not available at that time.

The F-4Fs were employed to fill operational gaps twice; the first time due to Panavia Tornado delays, while the F-4F ICE was needed due to the Eurofighter Typhoon delays. The units equipped with F-4F ICE were JG 71, JG 72, JG 74 and JG 73. This latter was a mixed unit, sent to Preschen airbase and had one staffel of F-4s and one with MiG-29s. MiG-29 aircraft were gained after the fall of the Berlin wall upon unification with East Germany. This was a unique situation, until the phasing out of the Fulcrums.

The F-4F ICE program offered a reasonably inexpensive and capable aircraft for the interceptor role, albeit with limitations. Apart from natural deficiencies of the air frame design itself, the greatest drawbacks of the F-4F ICE were the lack of an IFF and MIDS capability. In beyond-visual-range scenarios, it therefore had to rely on target-identification by AWACS aircraft with which it had to communicate in a conventional voice-based manner. This together with the low number of procured AIM-120Bs (only 96, because Germany had ordered the MBDA Meteor, which however was not available until 2013) and the outdated APG-65 radar made it a rather defensive system.

In 1992–94, the EFA program was reviewed by German Defense Minister Volker Rühe, and there was extensive debate about the Luftwaffe' s future. At the end of 1994, there were about 70 F-4F ICE aircraft already modified, 40 were still waiting for APG-65 radar, and 40 were not modified but still in service. The costs sustained in the upgrades had incurred a delay in AMRAAM acquisition. At that time, it was hoped that the AIM-120 could be received by 2005 and then there were only funds for 96 missiles with an option for 288 more. The program review considered ending F-4F conversions and buying new fighters as "gap fillers", such as the MiG-29, McDonnell Douglas F-15 Eagle or F-16. There was doubt that even a simplified version of the Typhoon could be acquired. The review resulted in F-4F ICE being completed. The lack of AMRAAMs was a serious handicap and the MiG 29s were retained for longer than had been planned.

The ICE F-4Fs were expected to remain in service until JG-71 transitioned to the Eurofighter Typhoon in 2013. JG-73 retired its last F-4F in 2002 and replaced it with Eurofighters in 2003, while the last F-4F left JG-74 in March 2008. The remaining F-4F wings were disbanded without replacement during the 1990s and early 2000s. The German Air Force retired its last operational F-4F Phantom IIs on 29 June 2013. The Phantoms' retirement ceremony was attended by a crowd of 130,000 people at an open house at Wittmundhafen Air Base. German F-4F Phantoms had flown for roughly 279,000 hours from entering service on 31 August 1973 to retirement on 29 June 2013.

=== Units ===
German Air Force

- Jagdbombergeschwader 35 (JaboG 35)
- Jagdbombergeschwader 36 (JaboG 36)
- Aufklärungsgeschwader 51 (AG 51 "Immelmann")
- Aufklärungsgeschwader 52 (AG 52)
- Jagdgeschwader 71 (JG 71 "Richthofen")
- Jagdgeschwader 72 (JG 72 "Westfalen")
- Jagdgeschwader 73 (JG 73 "Steinhoff")
- Jagdgeschwader 74 (JG 74 "Mölders")
- Wehrtechnische Dienstelle 61

== Greece ==
At the end of the 1960s, the Hellenic Air Force (HAF) embarked upon a modernization program by ordering 40 Dassault Mirage F1s and a total of 56 F-4Es along with six RF-4Es. However, the final batch of 40 F-4Es were cancelled in 1981 following the election of a left-wing PASOK government.

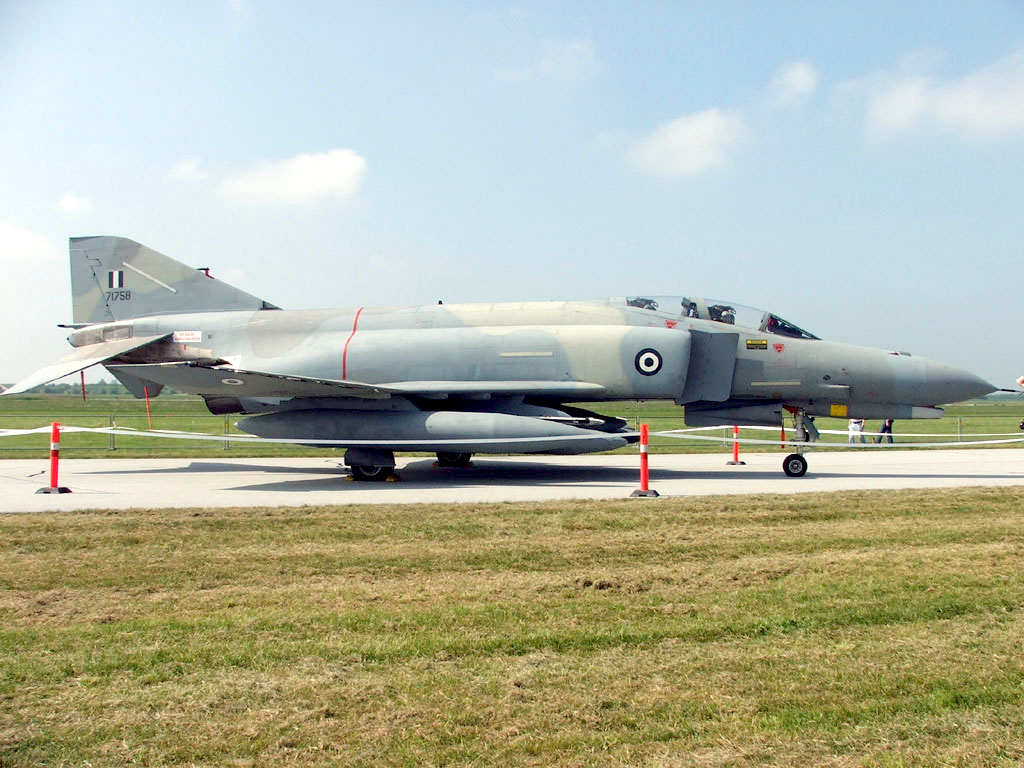
A low visibility scheme on a Greek F-4E.

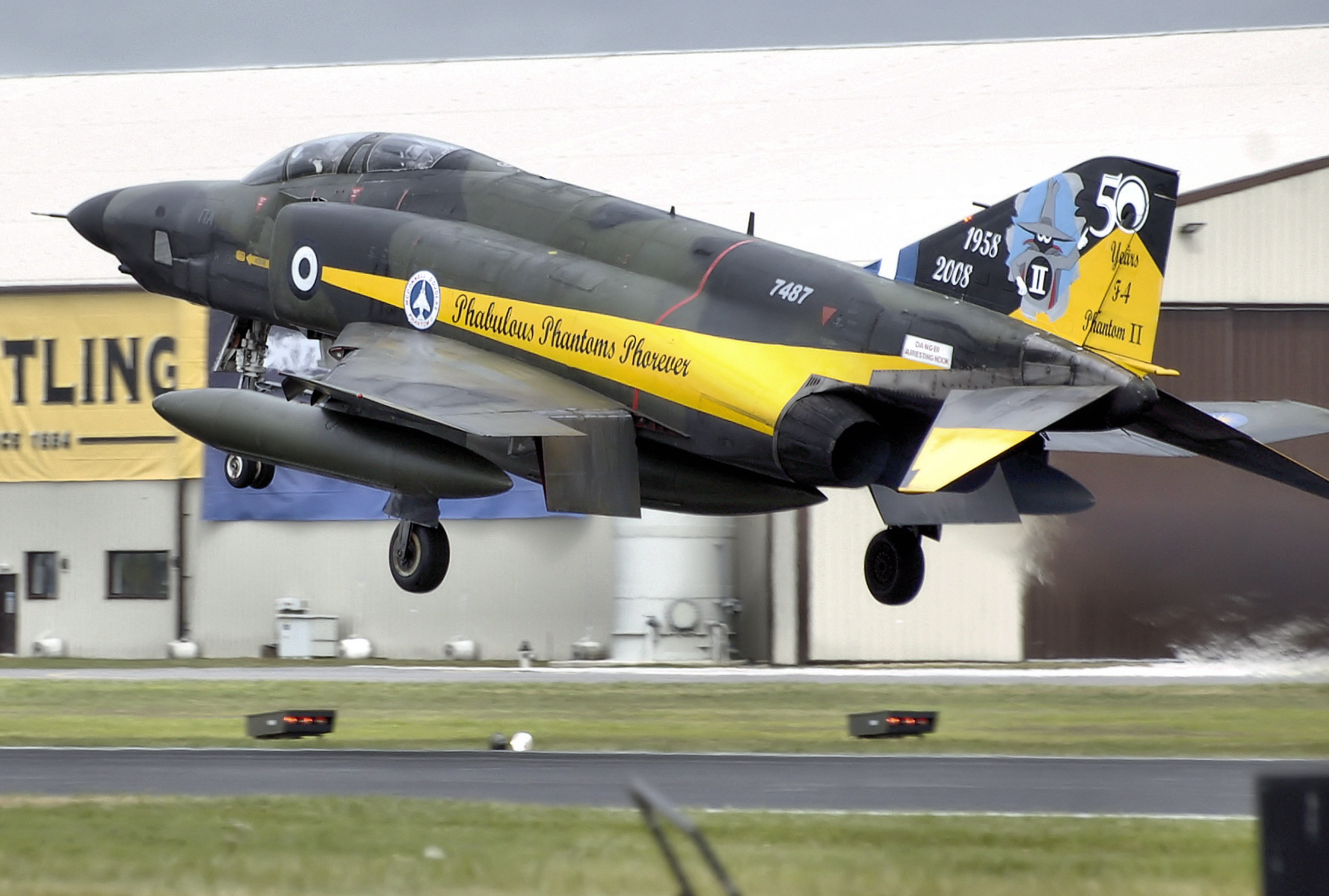
Hellenic Air Force RF-4E Phantom II of the 348th Tactical Reconnaissance Squadron, in a special colour scheme, lands at RIAT 2008.

The first 18 Greek Phantoms entered in service in 1974, partially funded by U.S. military assistance under the name "Operation Icarus". However, they did not enter service in time to see combat during the Turkish invasion of Cyprus in 1974. A second batch of F-4Es plus two extra aircraft were delivered in 1976, followed by a final batch in 1978–79. The first units equipped were the 339th Squadron in 1974 in the air-to-air role and also as the operational training unit; and the 338th Squadron, in 1975 in the ground-attack role. The 337th "Ghost" Squadron was equipped in 1978, retiring their Northrop F-5As. The 348th "Eyes" Squadron relinquished their RF-84Fs for new RF-4Es in 1979. The old RF-84Fs were retained until 1990 for training purposes.

The last batch of 40 Phantoms were not delivered due to the political situation in Greece, but with the Iraqi invasion of Kuwait and the US-led Operation Desert Storm, the situation changed. The USAF phased out many older aircraft and some were supplied to the Hellenic Air Force in exchange for the use of Greek airbases during the war. These included 10 aircraft that formerly belonged to the Indiana Air National Guard, later followed by a batch another 18 aircraft. By 1992, there were four squadrons equipped with 73 F-4Es and 5 RF-4Es: the 348th and 337th squadrons in Larissa, and the 338th and 339th squadrons at Andravida with the 117th Combat Wing.

There were many differences between the batches supplied to the Hellenic Air Force. The 338th "Ares" Squadron had an air-to-surface role. Their F-4Es were equipped with digital processors for the APG-120, laser inertial navigation systems, digital data buses, smoke-reduction systems and various structural improvements.

The 339th "Ajax" Squadron was employed in the air defense role with the older Phantoms, which had a Radar Warning Receiver mounted on the tail and air intakes, and the TISEO optical device.

=== Upgrades and further developments ===
One of the first measures taken by the PA was to increase the number of reconnaissance RF-4Es in their fleet, to augment the existing six. They were able to do this in 1993 when the Luftwaffe phased out their RF-4Es, and 29 ex-Luftwaffe aircraft were added to the 348th Squadron. This last batch brought the number of F-4s serving with the PA to 121. Other programs saw the upgrade of several Greek Phantoms to carry out anti-radar operations.

In 1993 the PA called for a major electronic upgrade for the F-4 fleet, involving the replacement of the APQ-120 with a new AMRAAM-capable system. Contenders to conduct the upgrade were DASA, Rockwell International, and IAI. IAI was ruled out because it was already involved with the Greeks' historical adversary, Turkey, upgrading their own Phantoms at this time.

DASA won the contract in August 1997, dubbed "Peace Icarus 2000". The Greek F-4s were upgraded to a similar standard as the Luftwaffe's F-4F ICE, including APG-65 radar, a GEC-Marconi HUD and GPS/INS. The first flight of an upgraded aircraft was on 28 April 1999 at Manching airbase. In total 38 aircraft were upgraded, 37 of them by Hellenic Aerospace Industry, at Tanagra. Phantoms were also provided with Rafael LITENING pods, capable of navigation, targeting and use of guided weapons, such as the AGM-65 Maverick. With these improvements, the F-4 ICE will remain an effective fighter well into the 21st century.

The RF-4E reconnaissance model were retired from Greek service on 5 May 2017 and the 348th Squadron was deactivated.

=== Units ===
Hellenic Air Force

- 110th Combat Wing
  - 348th Tactical Reconnaissance Squadron "Eyes" Deactivated 5 May 2017.
- 117th Combat Wing
  - 338th Fighter-Bomber Squadron "Ares"
  - 339th All-Weather Squadron "Ajax"

== Iran ==
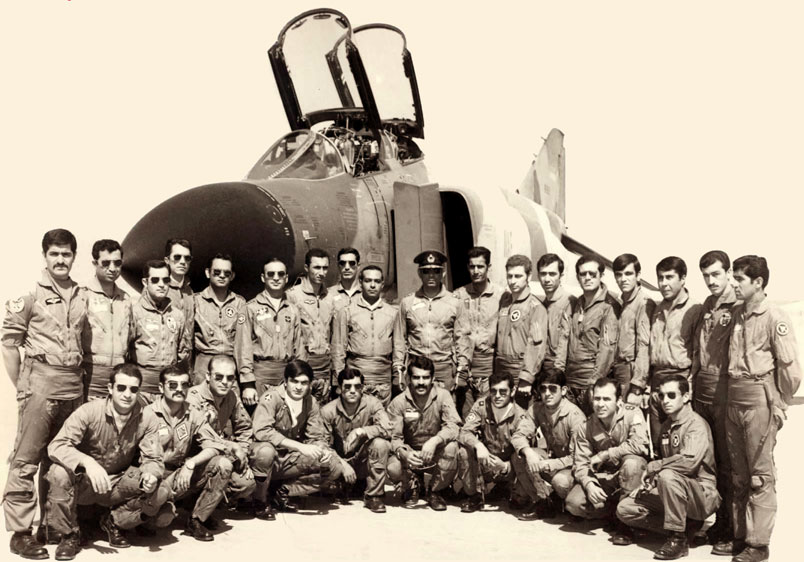
The first F-4D Phantom II tactical squadron based at Shiraz, 7th tactical fighter base in 1971.

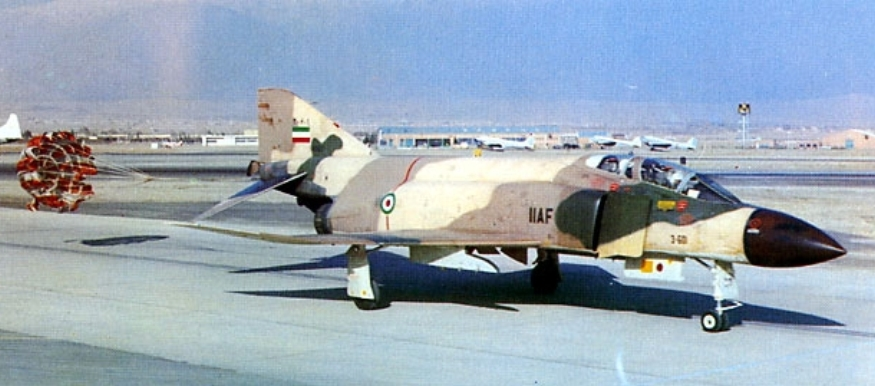
An IIAF F-4D in 1974.

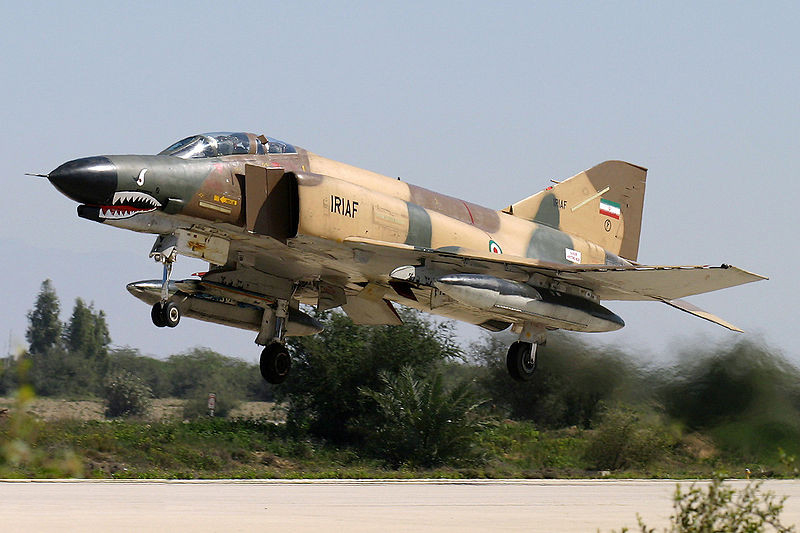
An IRIAF F-4E taking off in 2009.

The Imperial Iranian Air Force enjoyed more attention from Shah Mohammad Reza Pahlavi than any other branch of the Imperial armed forces. By 1967, the air force had F-4Ds on order, at that time the most advanced Phantom model available. In 1970, the first reconnaissance RF-4Es were delivered. Iran, with few fiscal restraints, followed that up with an order for 177 F-4Es. The first of these arrived in March 1971. During a border clash in June 1975, these F-4s, armed with AGM-65 Maverick missiles, defeated an Iraqi armored ground formation. The F-4Es changed the balance of power in the region; they were not only effective on the battlefield, but available in large numbers as well.

In 1970, the first reconnaissance RF-4Es were delivered. Iran, with few fiscal restraints, followed that up with an order for 177 F-4Es. The first of these arrived in March 1971. During a border clash in June 1975, these F-4s, armed with AGM-65 Maverick missiles defeated an Iraqi armored ground formation. The F-4Es changed the balance of power in the region; they were not only effective on the battlefield, but available in large numbers as well.

After the fall of the Shah in the Iranian Revolution of 1979, the situation changed dramatically. In 1979, the United States placed an armament embargo on Iran, preventing it from getting many spare parts to keep its F-4 fleet flying. To make matters worse, the new theocratic government carried out purges of suspected Shah loyalists in the armed forces, especially in the renamed Islamic Republic of Iran Air Force (IRIAF). The purges greatly weakened the air force and left the 180 Phantoms still in service largely without experienced air and ground crews.

The Iran–Iraq War began in September 1980 with a surprise Iraqi invasion of Iran. The Iraqi Air Force had been equipped with new aircraft, such as the MiG-23, and their senior brass believed that Iran was in a weakened and vulnerable state following the revolution and subsequent purges. However, the Iranian forces fought back effectively. Iraq failed to destroy the majority of Iranian air force bases for several reasons, among them that Iraqi aircraft had lacked the range to reach them. Another reason was that Iranian air bases had been built for USAF deployment in case of war with the Soviet Union. This meant that the bases were very large, well-dispersed and stocked with ample spare parts. This made targets difficult for the comparatively small Iraqi Air Force to destroy.

The Iraqi air force performed a very deep strike of more than 837 km (520 mi) inside Iran, but this small formation was intercepted by two Iranian F-4s and one or two MiGs were lost. F-4s struck back the following day in Operation Kaman 99 and destroyed many strategic Iraqi targets with bombs and missiles. After these attacks against strategic targets, the F-4s struck tactical battlefield targets, destroying many Iraqi armored vehicles. The Iraqi invasion was stopped within several weeks.

Due to battlefield and accidental losses and the lack of spare parts, by the mid-1980s there were just 20–30 Iranian Phantoms still flying. The quantity of weapons and spare parts was not enough to sustain the fleet, but Iran is believed to have benefited from foreign assistance with clandestine shipments of up to 23 new airframes, plus spares from the U.S. and Israel (during the Iran-Contra Affair), as well as from locally designed and reverse-engineered components and weapons, and incorporation of ex-Soviet and Chinese technology. The aircraft of an Iranian F-4 pilot who deserted on 31 August 1984 to Saudi Arabia was examined and found to have Israeli and European spare parts installed. Another deserting F-4 was less lucky, being intercepted and shot down by Saudi F-15 Eagles on 5 June 1984. F-4s took part in interdiction missions against oil tankers using AGM-65 Maverick missiles and AIM-9 Sidewinder air-to-air missiles.

In the 21st century, the IRIAF is reported to still have between 50 and 75 F-4s in service. Among these, there are still some original F-4Ds updated with improved avionics, including limited look-down radar. On 30 November 2014, Al Jazeera reported that an Iranian F-4 had conducted an airstrike in Iraq against militants of the Islamic State. The United States confirmed the attack several days later, but Iran did not confirm nor deny the strikes had taken place; both denied they had coordinated in any sort of air attack against IS forces in Iraq.

=== Units ===
Imperial Iranian Air Force

Western Area Command:

- Nojeh (OIHH) Hamadan, Shahrokhi)
  - 3rd Tactical Air Base
    - 31st Tactical Reconnaissance Squadron: RF-4E
    - 32nd Tactical Fighter Squadron: F-4D and F-4E
    - 33rd Tactical Fighter Squadron: F-4D and F-4E

Southern Area Command:

- Bushehr (OIBB)
  - 6th Tactical Air Base
    - 61st Tactical Fighter Squadron: F-4E
    - 62nd Tactical Fighter Squadron: F-4D and F-4E
- Bandar Abbas Int'l (OIKB)
  - 9th Tactical Air Base
    - 91st Tactical Fighter Squadron: F-4E
    - 92nd Tactical Fighter Squadron: F-4E
- Chah Bahar (OIZC) (Chabahar)
  - 10th Tactical Air Base
    - 101st Tactical Fighter Squadron: F-4D

== Israel ==
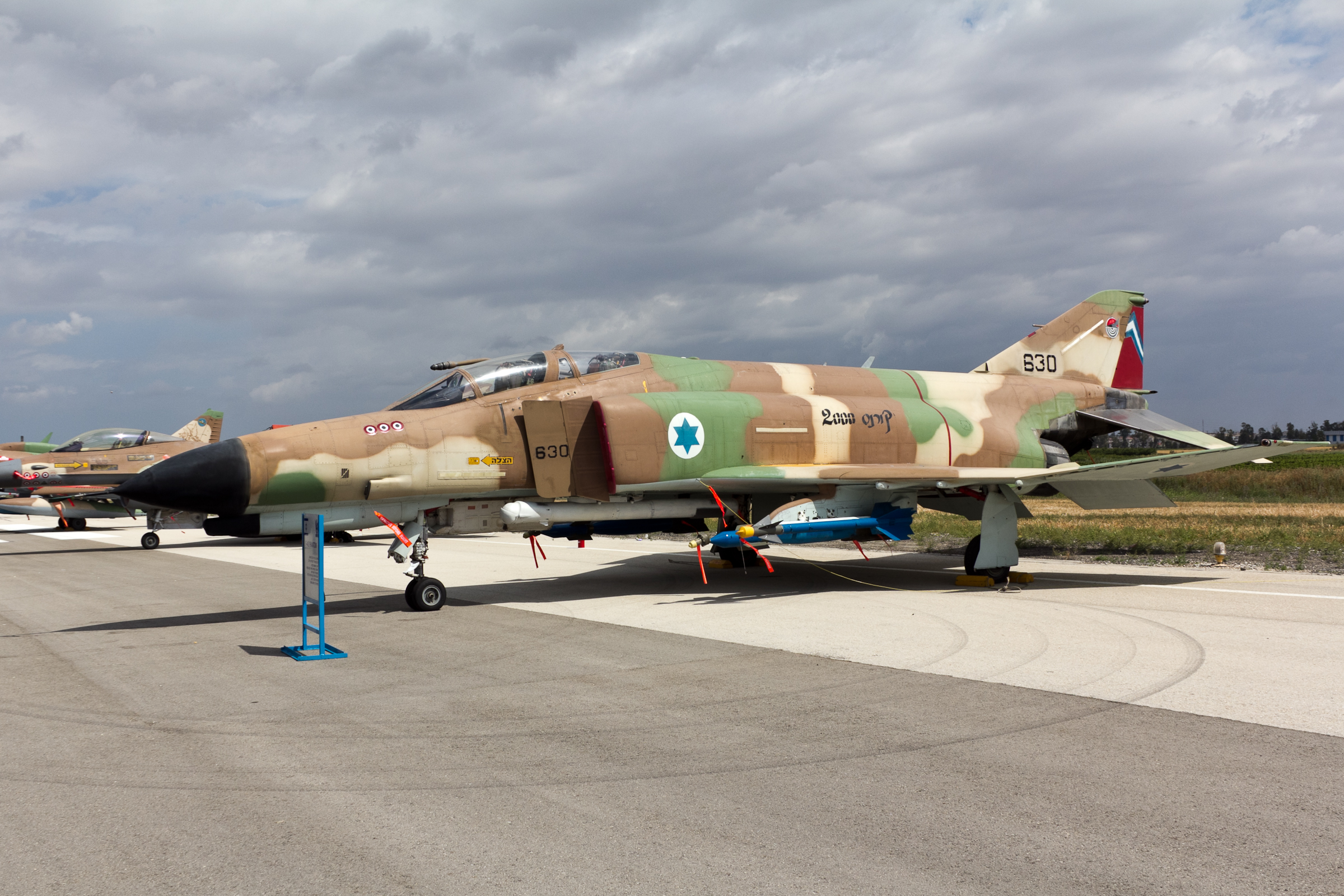
A Kurnass 2000 (Upgraded F-4E) belonging to 201 Squadron, in the standard IAF color scheme, on display on Independence Day 2013.

Israel first expressed interest in acquiring the F-4 in 1965, but the U.S. was unwilling to provide them at that time. However, due to the embargo imposed by France after the Israeli preemptive strike during the 1967 Six-Day War, the U.S. government reconsidered and decided to offer Israel the aircraft.

The first aircraft delivered were F-4Es, provided under the "Peace Echo" program, authorized on 7 January 1968, by president Lyndon Johnson, and supported by Senator Robert F. Kennedy. Around 220 F-4Es and RF-4Es were delivered to Israel between 1969 and 1976 under U.S. aid programs, and served with the Israeli Air Force (IAF). The F-4E was known as the Kurnass (Heavy Hammer) in Israeli service while the RF-4E was called the Orev (Raven).

Formal acceptance of the first F-4Es came on 5 September 1969, with Golda Meir and Moshe Dayan present for the ceremony. By 22 October, the new aircraft had begun operation. On 11 November 1969, the F-4 recorded its first kill in Israeli service after downing an Egyptian MiG-23. Shortly after on 9 December 1969, 1st Lts. Ahmad Ataf of the Egyptian Air Force, flying another MiG-21, shot down an F-4E of the IAF. However, Egyptian fighters had a hard time dealing with the F-4s, and their SA-2 Surface-to-air missiles (SAMs) were not effective at low altitudes. To address the problem, SA-3s were shipped to Egypt by the Soviet Union, along with up to 5,000 Russian advisers. In a fierce aerial battle on 30 July 1970, four Phantoms baited a flight of Soviet-manned Egyptian MiGs. Up to five MiGs were shot down when eight Israeli Mirages, flying at low level, jumped them, achieving complete surprise.

A total of 24 Phantoms were delivered under Peace Echo II and III. Operation Night Light involved the loan of two RF-4Cs to the Israeli Air Force while they were waiting for their order for six RF-4Es to be delivered. Operation Peace Patch involved another batch of 12 Phantoms, delivered in 1971.

During combat missions against Egyptian and other Arab aircraft, Israeli F-4Es recorded 116.5 aerial victories, including the shootdowns of two Sukhoi Su-7s. Two IAF F-4Es also participated in the interception and shootdown of Libyan Arab Airlines Flight 114 in February 1973, leading to widespread international condemnation.

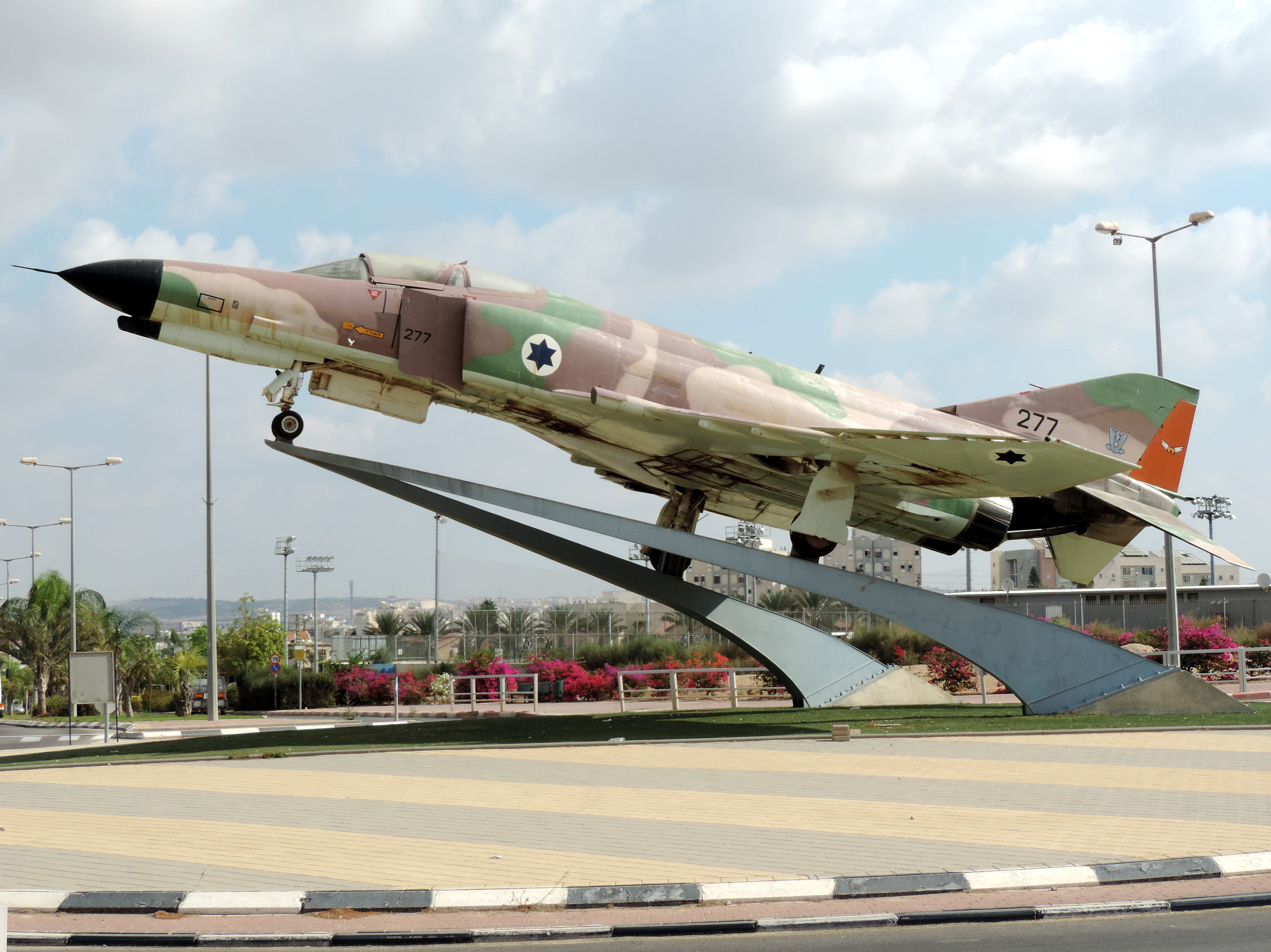
An F-4E formerly belonging to 107 Squadron on display at a traffic circle in Beersheba.

Peace Echo IV brought another 52 F-4s to the IDF, 24 of which were ex-USAF. These were delivered between April 1972 and October 1973, when the Yom Kippur War broke out. At that time there were 122 F-4E and 6 RF-4Es in service with the IDF.

=== Yom Kippur War ===
The Yom Kippur War started with a surprise Egyptian and Syrian strike on Israel during Yom Kippur, the holiest day in Judaism. During this opening phase, a pair of Phantoms engaged a flight of 20 Egyptian MiG-17s and 8 MiG-21s attacking the IAF base at Ofira, managing to destroy seven, while another pair of F-4s intercepted and downed five Egyptian Mil Mi-8 assault helicopters carrying commandos over the Sinai desert.

On the second day of the war, the IAF launched attacks over the Golan Heights with F-4s and A-4 Skyhawks on Syrian missile sites, but Syrian forces, now equipped with the new SA-6 Gainful surface-to-air missile system and the radar-guided ZSU-23-4 Shilka, shot down six Phantoms and thirty A-4s. The SA-6 used semi-active radar homing and was paired with the 1S91 "Straight Flush" fire control and guidance radar, which operated in the G, H, I and J bands, making it very difficult to jam with the AN/ALQ-87 ECM pods that were supplied to Israel by the United States prior to the conflict. Likewise, the AN/ALR-36 radar warning receivers that Israeli Phantoms were equipped with at the time proved unable to provide any warning to aircrews that their aircraft were being tracked by SA-6 batteries.

Some aerial maneuvers were believed to fool the SA-6 systems, and these were used while the IDF waited for better electronic countermeasures. Some of the maneuvers were quite effective, but the SA-6 threat was only reduced on 9 October 1973 when A-4s surprised and destroyed them. That same day another F-4 strike hit the Damascus HQ of the Syrian Army.

By the mid-October, 37 Phantoms had been lost in combat and another six were damaged beyond repair. U.S. President Richard Nixon authorized the delivery of 36 ex-USAF F-4s under the name Operation Nickel Grass, with the aircraft coming from the USAF 4th and 401st Tactical Fighter Wings. These aircraft were flown directly to Israel, some by U.S. pilots. At least one F-4E flew in combat still bearing a U.S. tail code, while others stayed painted in USAF camouflage patterns. During the war, Israeli Phantoms first used the new AGM-65 Maverick missile.

Israel employed three F-4E(S), which were equipped with a special high-altitude camera system (HIAC) for reconnaissance missions. These RF-4Es were special high-performance Phantoms, with the same cameras planned for the Mach 3.2 RF-4X that was cancelled in 1975. The camera performed well but mounting it in an external pod caused too much drag, so it was installed in the nose of three normal F-4Es instead.

During the Yom Kippur War, it was reported that one Israeli F-4 squadron was put on alert for a nuclear strike, but not confirmed. After several weeks of combat, losses included four F-4s delivered under the Nickel Grass program.

=== Post - 1973 ===
After the war, Peace Echo V provided Israel with 24 new, 24 ex-USAF and 6 RF-4Es, completing the program in November 1976.

Given that almost all the Israeli F-4s had suffered battle damage, an update to increase their capabilities and standardize the various production blocks was commenced in 1974. The IDF Phantoms received Elbit Jason digital bombing computers, Litton LW-33 inertial navigation systems, new radar warning receivers, TISEO and combat slats.

IDF Phantoms took part in many other battles, among them Operation Mole Cricket 19 in June 1982, when Syrian SA-6 sites were destroyed by a coordinated attack made by IDF aircraft and unmanned aerial vehicles. By that time, new F-15 Eagles and F-16s were replacing the Phantom in front line service, so the F-4s scored only one aerial victory in that action.

=== Upgrades ===
A planned program to replace the original General Electric J79 engines with the Pratt & Whitney PW1120 was cancelled, but the fleet was updated to Kurnass 2000 standards. This upgrade included installation of a wide-angle Kaiser HUD, a digital mission computer and some structural improvements. The main updates involved the APG-76 radar, Elbit ACE-3 mission computer, HOTAS, the addition of winglets for increased agility, ASX-1 TISEO and the ability to deploy Popeye missiles. The upgraded aircraft first flew on 15 July 1987 and was formally accepted on 11 August 1987. The Kurnass program was also used to upgrade Turkish Air Force Phantoms at the same time, realizing some economies of scale.

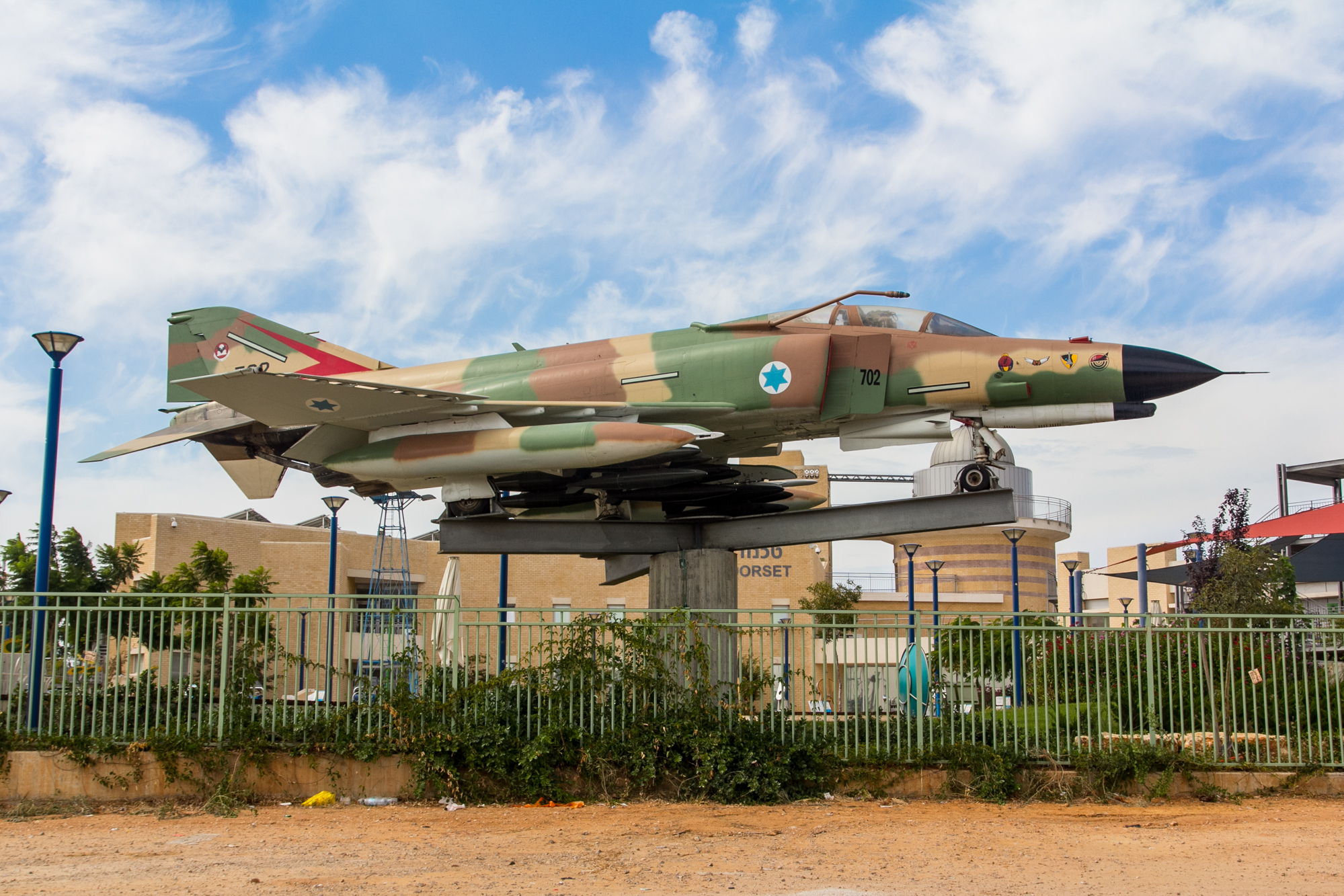
A Phantom on display in Givat Olga – on its nose are the badges of the other 4 IAF F-4 squadrons.

By the end of the 20th century there were still 112 F-4s serving with the IDF, in three Squadrons: the 119, 142 and 201.

=== Units ===
Israeli Air Force

- 69 Squadron Ha'patishim (The Hammers) - טייסת הפטישים
- 105 Squadron Akrav (Scorpion) - טייסת העקרב
- 107 Squadron Zanav Katom (Knights of the Orange Tail) - אבירי הזנב הכתום
- 119 Squadron Atalef (Bat) - טייסת העטלף
- 201 Squadron Ahat (The One) - הטייסת האחת

== Japan ==
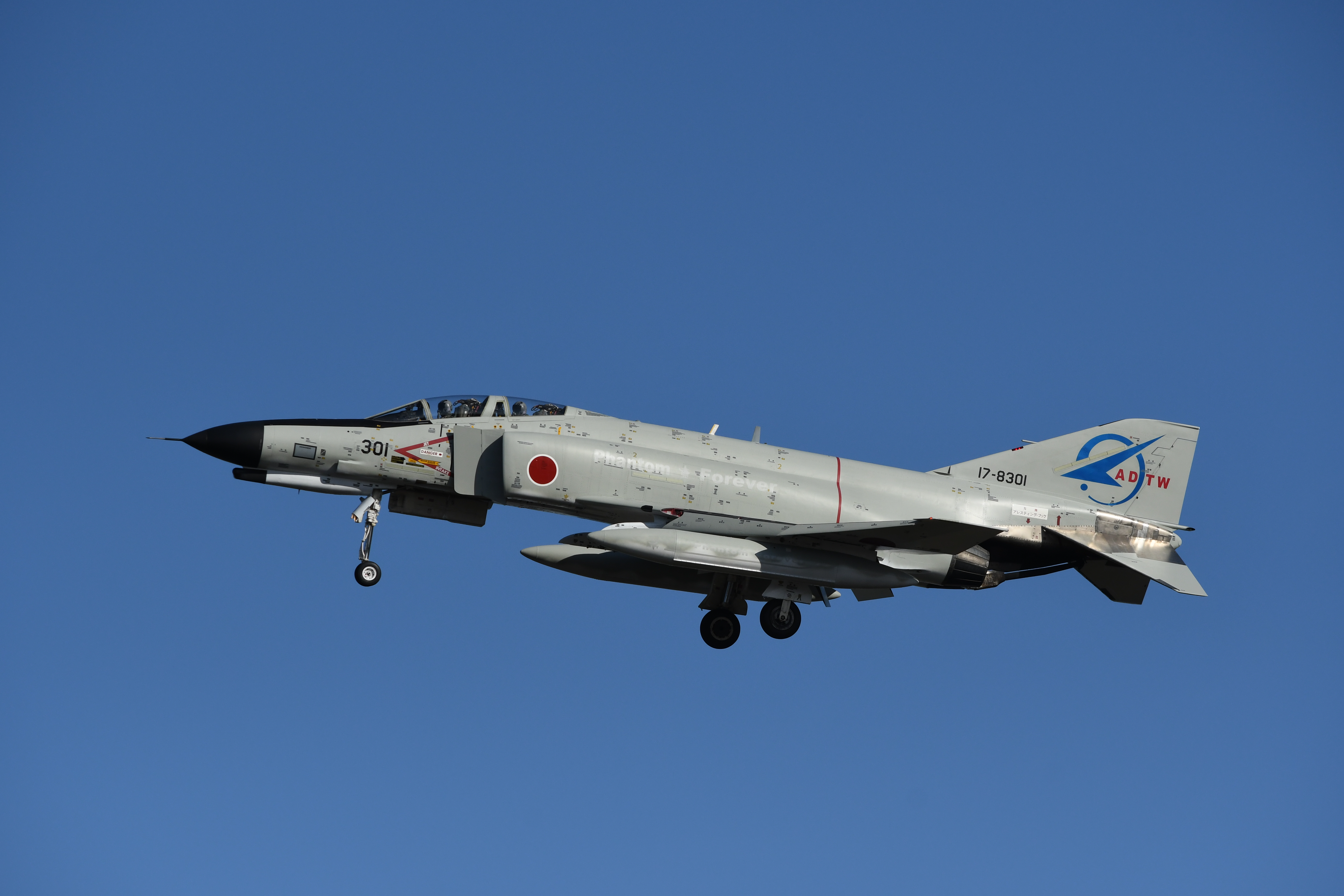
JASDF F-4EJ 17-8301, 2020. This was the first Phantom built for Japan, serving from March 1971 until the F-4EJs were retired on 17 March 2021.

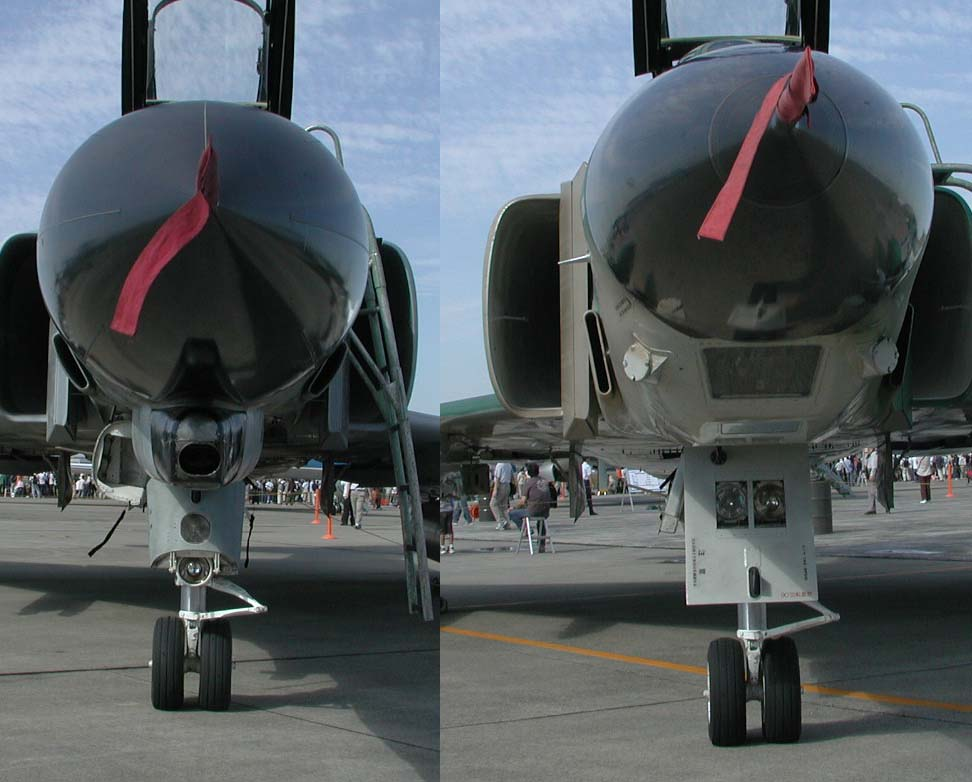
F-4EJ (left) and RF-4E showing nose differences.

Japan selected the F-4 Phantom II as its new fighter at the end of the 1960s. On 1 November 1968, this choice was made public and Japan became one of the few countries that license-produced this aircraft. The Japan Air Self-Defense Force received a total of 154 F-4EJsand RF-4Es. While the F-4EJs were built almost entirely by Mitsubishi Heavy Industries, the RF-4Es were bought directly from McDonnell-Douglas.

Due to Japanese military limitations prohibiting air-to-ground ordnance, the F-4EJs were delivered without the AN/AJB-7 bombing computer system and also did not have an air-refueling probe or receptacle. In service F-4EJs replaced the JASDF's fleet of Lockheed F-104J Starfighters.

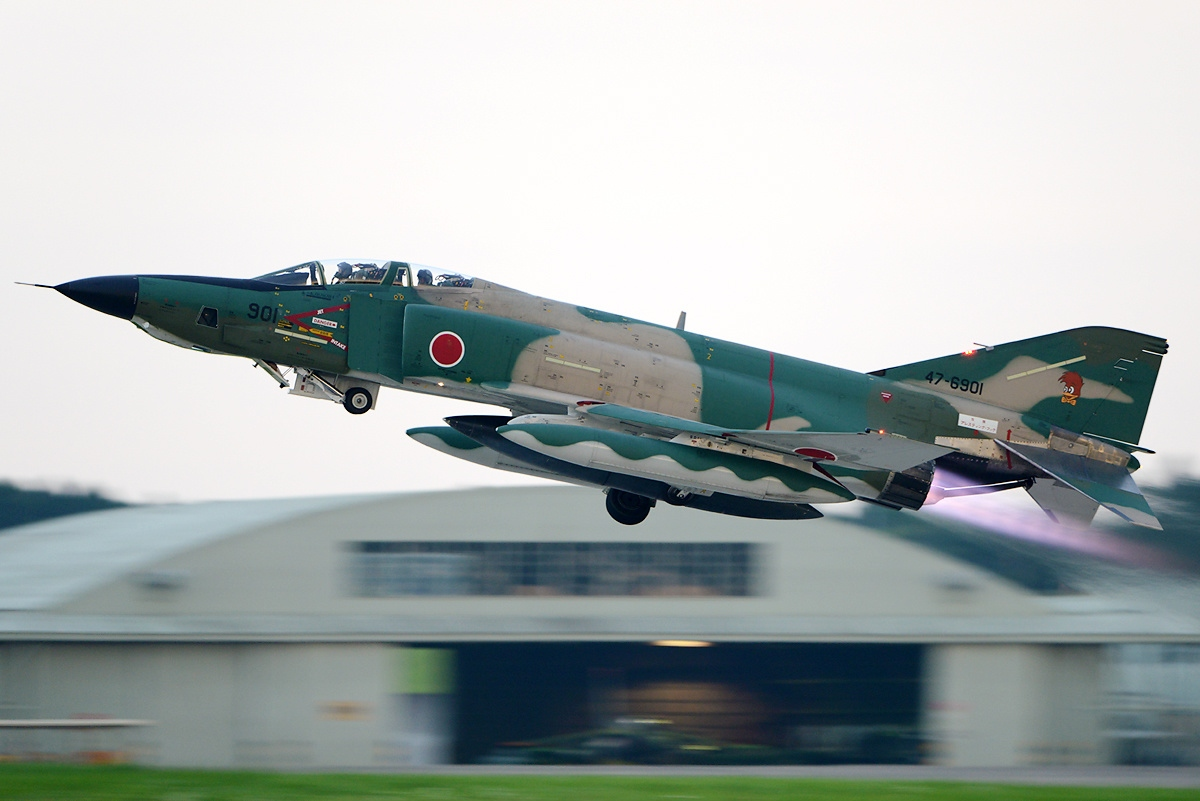
JASDF RF-4E 47-6901 of 501st Hikōtai departing from Hyakuri Air Base, 2019. This was the first RF-4E to be built for Japan.

McDonnell Douglas built the two prototype F-4EJs (17-8301 and 17-8302), which first flew on 14 January 1971. These prototypes were delivered to Gifu Air Base in March 1971. The next 11 aircraft were assembled in Japan and the first Japanese-built example flew on 12 May 1972. Mitsubishi built all the EJs over the next nine years and the production ended with 127th F-4EJ (17-8440), on 20 May 1981. This was the last F-4 built in the world.

Fourteen RF-4Es were delivered between November 1974 and June 1975. These were similar to the RF-4C, but, as for the F-4EJs, Japanese-built radar warning receivers and other equipment were substituted to replace equipment which was not released for export to Japan.

The F-4EJ entered service with the JASDF in August 1972 with a total of six Hikōtai ("Squadrons") operating the aircraft: the 301, 302, 303, 304, 305 and 306th. The RF-4E equipped the 501st, that had previously operated one of the less-well-known Sabre models, the RF-86F.

Japanese procurement involved small, multi-year orders, which made for slow production of small batches ordered every year. As of 2007, Japan has a fleet of 90 F-4s currently in service. Talks were underway to replace them with Eurofighter Typhoon aircraft, since the sale of the American F-22 Raptor was blocked by U.S. export restrictions. In June 2007, Lockheed Martin announced that the company has been awarded a contract to equip several F-15 Eagles with synthetic aperture radar pods. These F-15s will be used in a reconnaissance role, allowing the RF-4E and RF-4EJ to be retired; the F-4 having served from the 1970s into the 21st century.

On 9 March 2020, the RF-4 was retired after 45 years in JASDF service. A four-ship flight of RF-4Es and RF-4EJs from the 501st Hikōtai performed a ceremonial flypast, which included aircraft serial 47-6901, the first RF-4E built for Japan and the first to be handed over. This left the 301st Hikōtai, who at the time were still flying the F-4EJ Kai, as the last remaining squadron equipped with Phantoms in Japan.

The 301st Hikōtai continued to operate the F-4EJ until 14 December 2020 when the Phantom was withdrawn from front-line service, remaining in use with the Air Development and Test Wing at Gifu. The final JASDF Phantoms were retired on 17 March 2021.

=== Upgrades ===
To upgrade the Phantom fleet the JASDF planned the F-4EJ Kai (Japanese for "modified") program. This involved 110 aircraft, later reduced to 96, which were upgraded with APG-66 radar, ground attack capabilities and most importantly, ASM-1 or ASM-2 anti-ship missiles (two mounted under the wings). This boosted their capabilities in the anti-shipping role; filling in for the indigenous Mitsubishi F-1s which were too few in number and lacked range, and the P-3Cs which were too slow, even if well-armed with Harpoon missiles. The F-4EJ Kai upgrade added several other air-to-surface weapons to the F-4, including bombs and rockets.

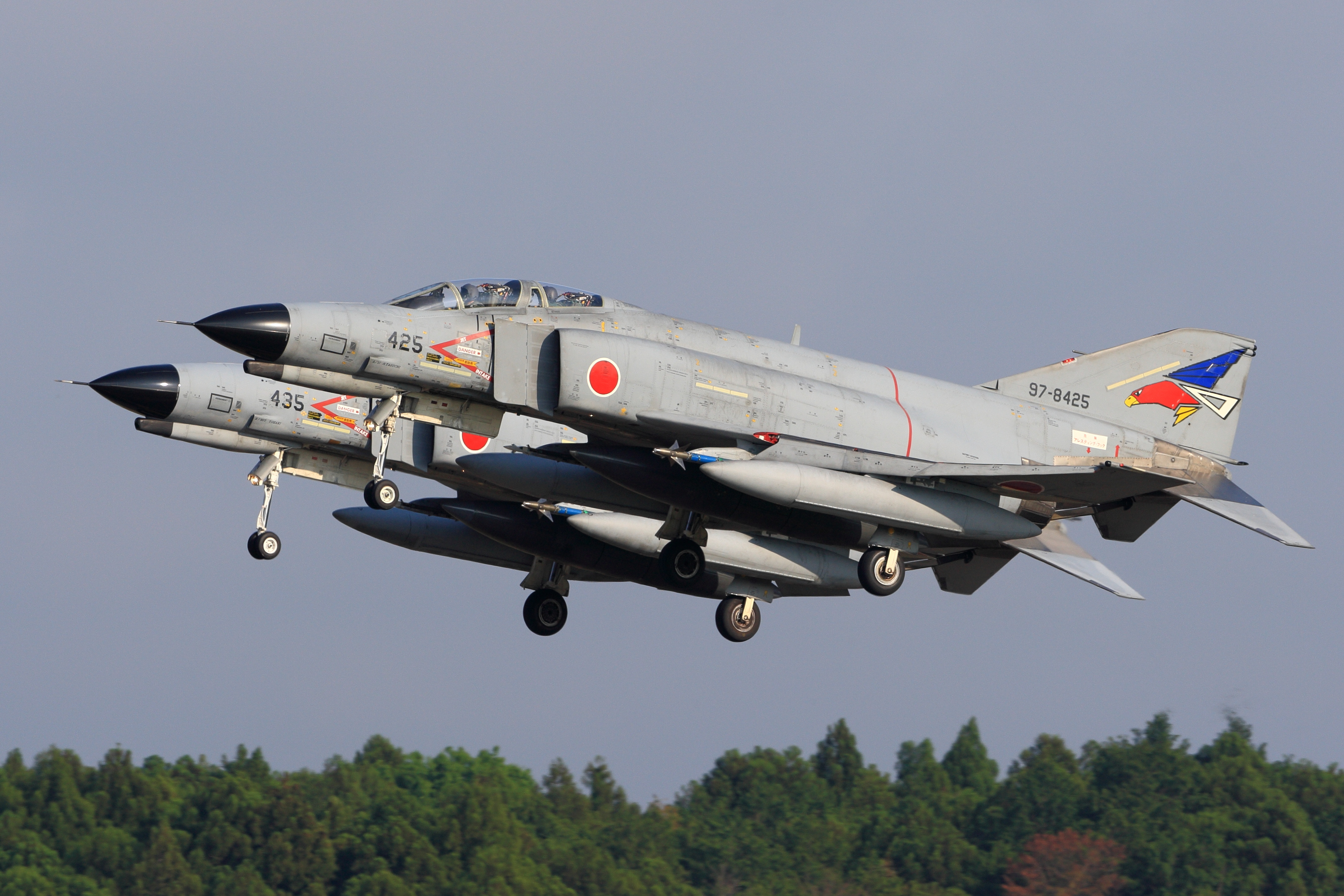
A pair of F-4EJ Kais from the 302nd Hikōtai, 2012.

Fifteen F-4EJs were also converted to RF-4EJ configuration, which, while mounting no internal cameras, carried podded reconnaissance equipment. Among the systems installed were TACER (electronic reconnaissance pod with datalink), TAC (pod with KS-135A and KS-95B cameras), D-500UR IR detection system, and the LOROP pod (with a KS-146B camera).

The F-4EJ Kai first flew on 17 July 1984, and entered service on 24 November 1989 with the JASDF 306th Squadron. It was fitted the smaller and more lightweight AN/APG-66J pulse Doppler radar and a heads-up display resulting in a lookdown/shootdown capability. The central computer was updated, as well as the J/APR-6 homing and warning system, IFF system and the inertial navigation unit.

The first F-4EJ Kai aircraft were delivered to the 306th Hikōtai at Komatsu, but within a few years they were replaced by F-15Js. In April 1994, the F-4EJ strength was reduced to three squadrons: 8 (Misawa), 301 (Nyutabaru) and 302 (Naha, Okinawa). The 501st at that time operated the RF-4E. Over time the F-4s and F-1s were replaced with the new Mitsubishi F-2, an enlarged development of the F-16 developed jointly with Lockheed Martin.

=== Units ===
Japan Air Self-Defense Force

- Air Development and Test Wing (1971–2021)
- 8th Hikōtai (1997–2009)
- 301st Hikōtai (1973–2020)
- 302nd Hikōtai (1974–2019)
- 303rd Hikōtai (1976–1987)
- 304th Hikōtai (1977–1990)
- 305th Hikōtai (1978–1993)
- 306th Hikōtai (1981–1997)
- 501st Hikōtai (1974–2020)

== South Korea ==
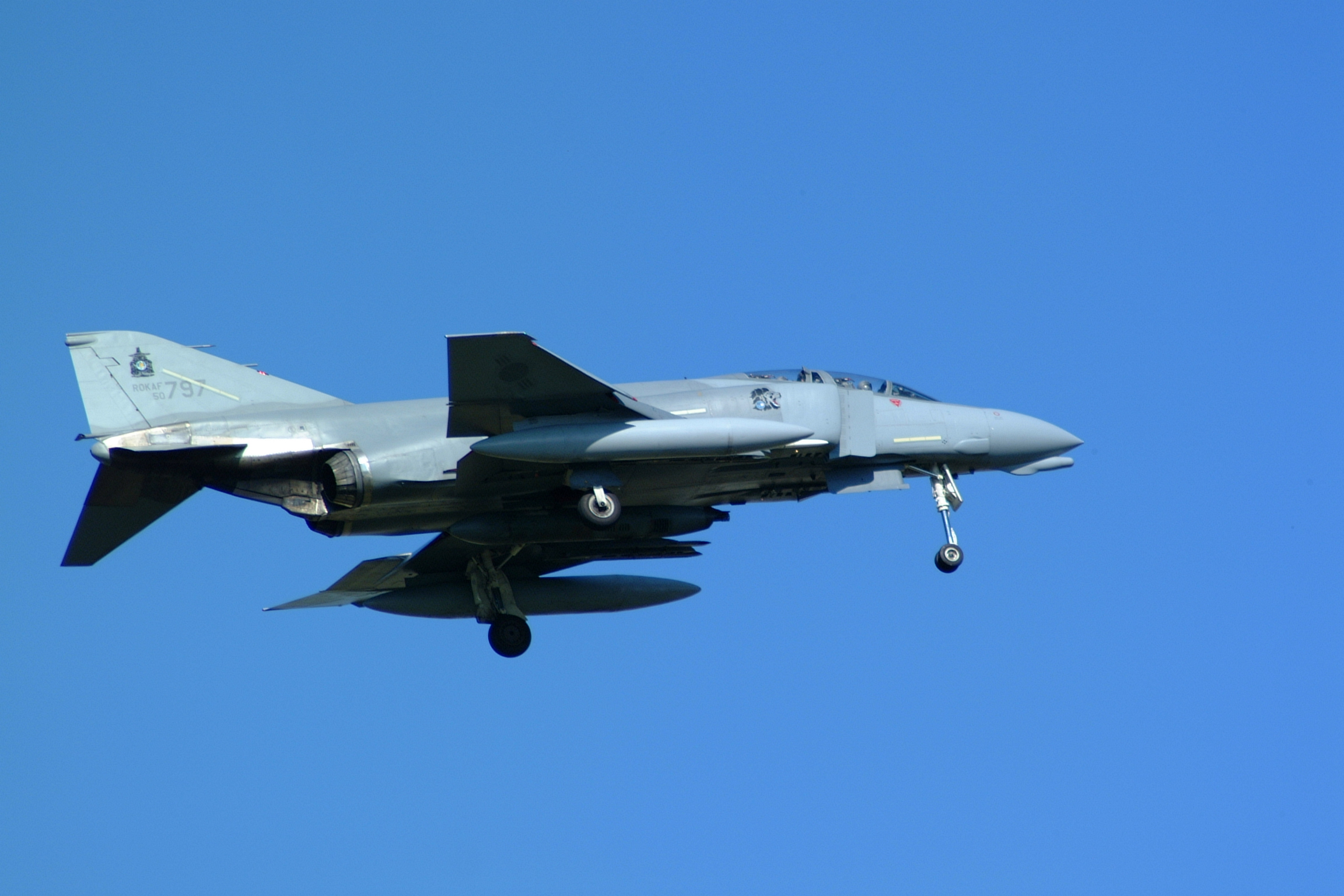
F-4D Phantom II of South Korea's 11th Tactical Fighter Wing, 2005.

The Republic of Korea Air Force (ROKAF) were supplied with F-4s starting in the late 1960s, due to ongoing tensions with North Korea.

The Korean government, under the rule of Park Chung Hee, ordered 16 ex-USAF F-4Ds, which were quickly delivered under the Peace Spectator program. They served with the 110th TFS, 11th Fighter Wing based at Daegu beginning in 1969. In 1972, another 18 Phantoms were delivered from the USAF 3rd TFW (Tactical Fighter Wing), in exchange for the handover of 36 ex-ROKAF Northrop F-5s to the South Vietnamese Air Force. Several more F-4s were delivered in the following years, with the last batch being delivered in 1987-88. These were equipped with Pave Tack laser designators, an important feature that allowed the use of laser-guided bombs.

A total of 92 F-4Ds were delivered, making the ROKAF the main export customer for the "D" model. The F-4Ds were joined by 37 newly-built F-4Es, ordered in the 1970s. Under Operation Peace Pheasant, these were delivered to the ROKAF's 152nd and 153rd Tactical Fighter Squadrons, and the 17th Tactical Fighter Wing based at Cheongju.

The South Koreans also received RF-4Cs. There were 12 ex-USAF 460 TRG (Tactical Reconnaissance Group, disbanded in 1990) that were sent to the South Korean 131st TRS (Tactical Reconnaissance Squadron), 39 TRG, at Suwon Air Base, along with another 11 sent later. ALQ-131 electronic countermeasures pods were also delivered.

Overall, South Korea was one of the main customers of the F-4, with 216 delivered, including 60 "D" models, 55 "E" models and 18 RF-4Cs in service as of 2000. The F-4 was the ROKAF's primary fighter until the KF-16 began to be introduced in 1994. The 20 F-4D units based in Daegu were retired as of 16 June 2010, with the squadron replacing the Phantoms with the F-15K.

By April 2024, only about 10 F-4s were still operational in South Korean service. The F-4 was formally retired from ROKAF service on 7 June 2024 after 55 years of service.

=== Upgrades ===
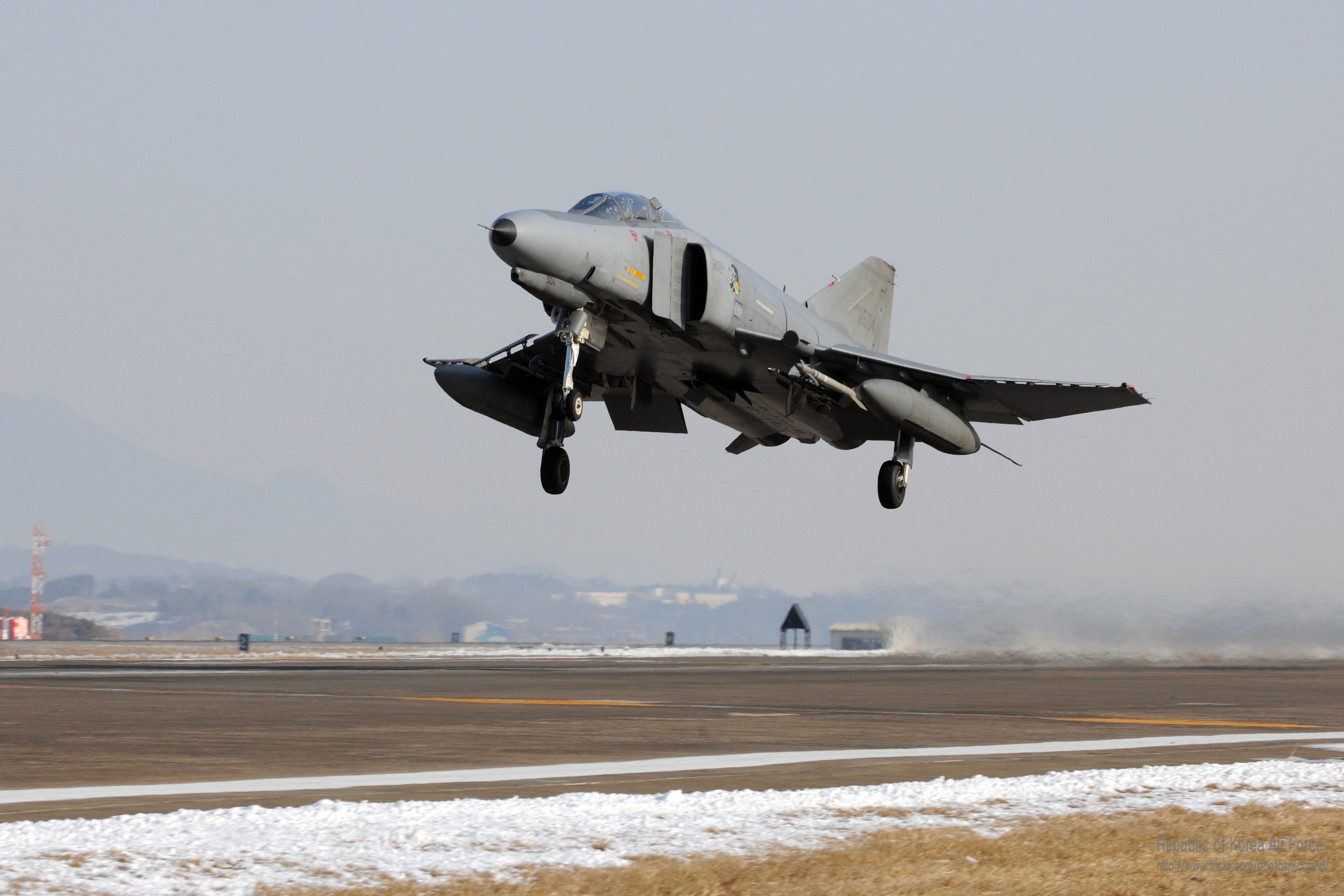
F-4E 60-504 (ex-USAF 76-0504) of the 153rd TFS at Suwon Air Base, 2011.

The ROKAF has been quite satisfied with the F-4 and has carried out upgrades to extend their lifespan. A proposal made by DASA was evaluated that would have included installation of the APG-66 radar and AMRAAM missiles. This was equivalent to the Japanese F-4EJ KAI or German F-4 ICE, but the costs were considered too high. The Air Force had already been forced to cancel an order for F-18s, which had been the winner of their new fighter competition and instead bought F-16 Fighting Falcons.

Despite the financial constraints, several minor upgrades were made to allow South Korean F-4s to continue in their role against North Korea. Some F-4s were upgraded with the AN/AVQ-26 Pave Tack laser targeting pod. 30 F-4Es were equipped with the AGM-142 "Popeye" stand-off air-to-surface missile; a modern Israeli weapon also purchased by the USAF, Royal Australian Air Force and the Turkish Air Force.

=== Units ===
Republic of Korea Air Force

- 10th Tactical Fighter Wing
  - 39th TRG
  - 131st TRS
- 11th Tactical Fighter Wing
  - 110th TFS
  - 151st TFS
- 17th Tactical Fighter Wing
  - 152nd TFS
  - 153rd TFS

== Spain ==
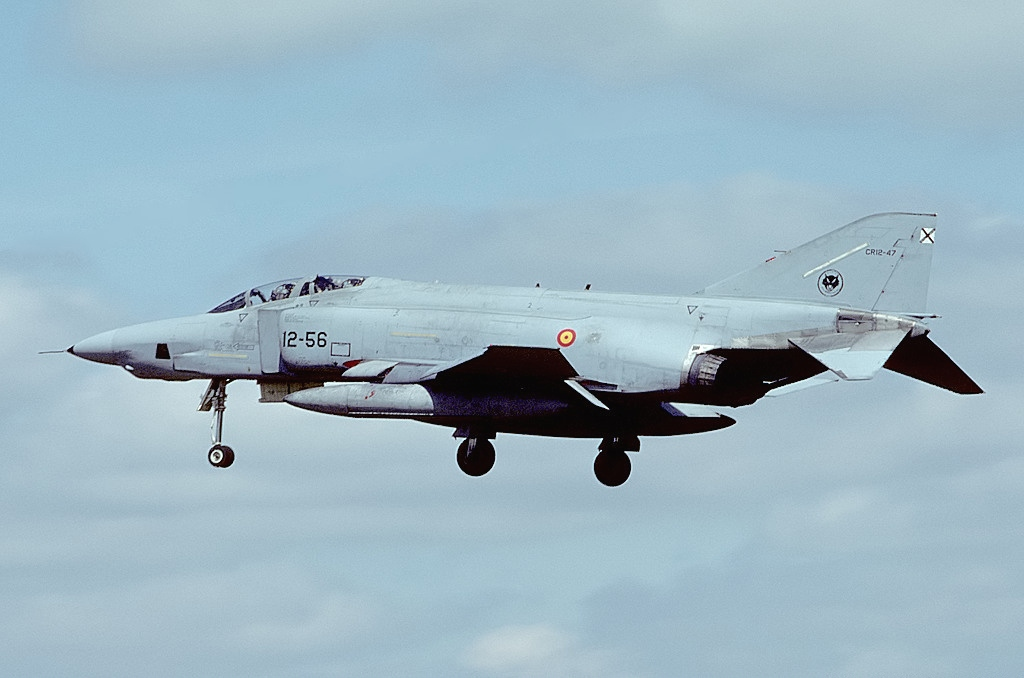
Spanish RF-4C CR.12-47 landing at RAF Honington, United Kingdom, 1993

Through the Mutual Defense Aid Program (MDAP), Spain acquired 36 ex-USAF F-4Cs for Spanish Air Force. These were the only "C" models ever exported, even as second-hand examples.

Deliveries occurred between October 1971 and September 1972 under Peace Alfa. At the time of delivery these F-4Cs were already obsolete, but they replaced even older aircraft, F-104Gs and F-86Fs.

In Spanish Air Force use, the F-4Cs were designated "C.12" (C stood for "Caza" and 12 stood for "12th fighter type in service since the creation of the Ejército del Aire"). The F-4Cs were assigned to Escuadrones 121 and 122, Ala 12 (Wing). To support them a fleet of three KC-97Ls was acquired in 1972, equipping Escuadrón 123, being replaced by KC-130Hs (which equipped Escuadrón 301) from January 1976. While the KC-97s were fitted with a flying boom refuelling system, the Hercules that replaced them were fitted with the probe and drogue system and so could not refuel the F-4s.

Further F-4 deliveries took place in October 1978, with the addition of four F-4Cs and four RF-4Cs. The RF-4Cs were given the Spanish designation CR.12.

The RF-4Cs continued to serve in the reconnaissance role along with another eight ex-USAF RF-4C delivered in 1989 in the 123 Squadron, that operated from Torrejón airbase.

This batch of RF-4Cs was updated to the highest USAF standard prior to delivery and had a completely revised avionic suite, including new radios, RWR, VOR and ILS navigation equipment and KS-86 cameras. These aircraft also had J79-GE-15E "smokeless" engines.

In 1995, the older F-4s were retired and six more RF-4Cs were obtained. The new RF-4Cs had newer avionics, including Have Quick digital UHF/VHF radios, Itek AN/ARL-46 RWR, and Tracor AN/ALE-40 dispensers. The upgrades included provisions for up to four AIM-9L Sidewinder missiles, for self-defence and to provide a secondary capability as an interceptor. The existing fleet underwent a standardization program which among other changes included replacing the APQ-99 terrain-following radar by a Texas Instruments AN/APQ-172 radar, laser-ring gyro inertial navigation system and an Israeli Aircraft Industries in-flight refueling probe, while the original USAF-style refuelling receptacle was retained.

These improvements allowed the Spanish RF-4C fleet to serve into the 21st century, finally being retired in 2002.

== Turkey ==
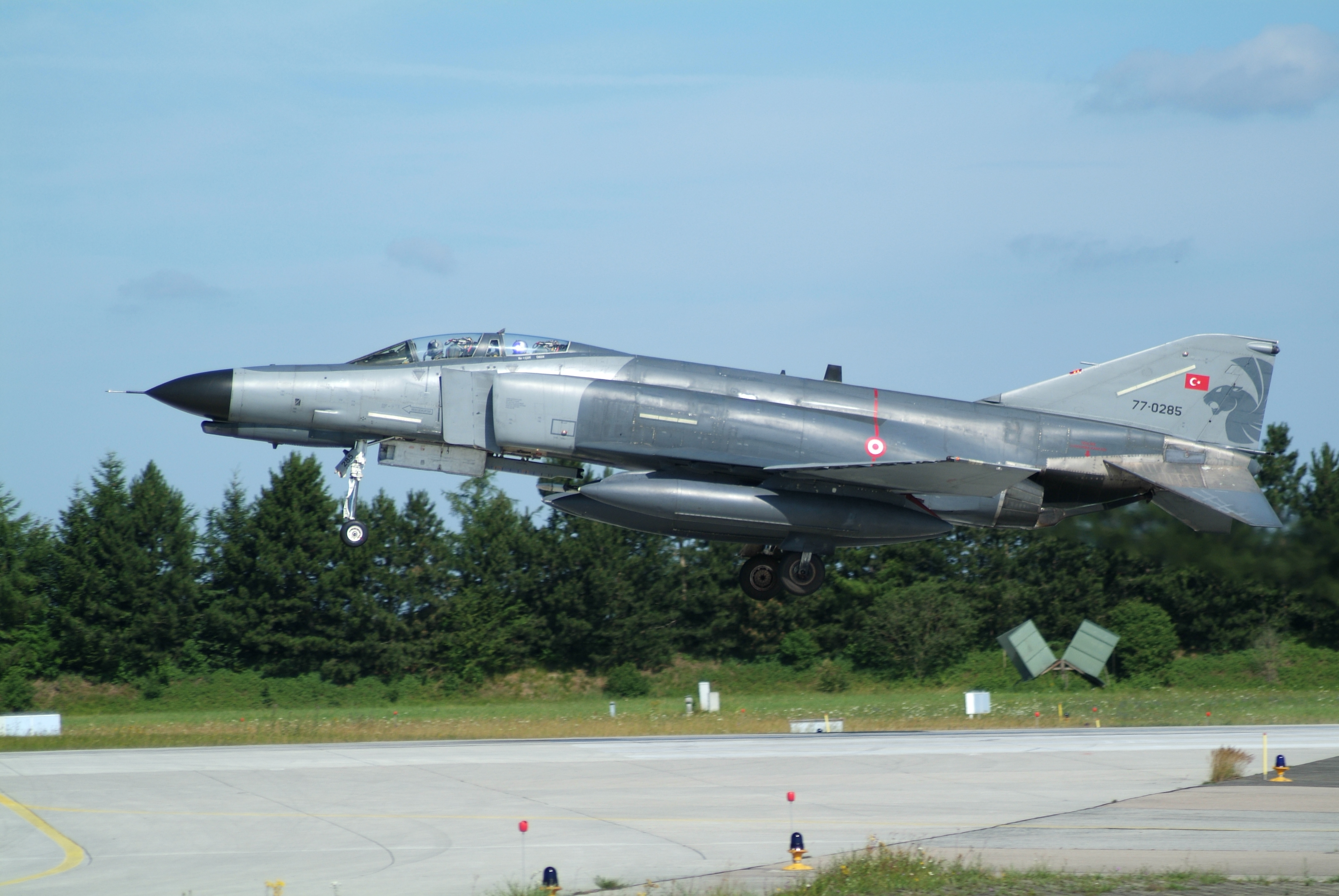
Ex-US Air Force Phantom serving with the Turkish Air Force

One of the most prominent Phantom users is the Turkish Air Force (THK), which operates about 233 F-4s.

Under the Peace Diamond I program, 40 F-4Es were ordered, with deliveries starting in June 1974, although completion of the order were delayed by an arms embargo following the Turkish invasion of Cyprus. The first Turkish squadrons to be equipped with the Phantoms. After re-equipping with F-16Cs these Phantoms were sent to 7 JAB for 171 and 172 Filo. Filo 173 at the same base was the Operational Conversion Unit.

Peace Diamond III was an additional phase of the plan to reinforce the THK, always striving to keep a balance with the Greek Hellenic Air Force, because even though both are NATO countries, Greece and Turkey are historical enemies and there have been air clashes over the Aegean Sea between them. Filo 111, 112, 113, all based on JAB 1, Eskişehir, were the new Phantom units. The 111th and 112th Filo received 32 F-4Es replacing their aging F-100s. The 113 Filo replaced their even older RF-84Fs with eight RF-4Es.

With this last batch of F-4s and plans to acquire F-16 Fighting Falcons, the THK was quickly being modernized. Before these aircraft arrived the THK had operated fighters such as the F-104 Starfighter, F-100 Super Sabre, F-84 Thunderflash and the F-86 Sabre, plus the economical F-5 Freedom Fighter. With 80 Phantoms on order, the strength of the THK was increased to new levels. Other fighters, seen as supplemental to the F-4E, were purchased as well. These included 40 Aeritalia F-104Ss, the improved Starfighter, with the same missiles and engines as used on the Phantoms. These equipped Filo 142 and 172. Compared to the F-4s they were considerably less expensive and were used as interceptors. The Turkish F-4 fleet was enhanced with 15 secondhand US aircraft delivered in 1981 to Filo 173 and finally, another 15 delivered in 1984 to replace fleet losses.

Peace Diamond IV was another program to reinforce the THK and was carried out between June and October 1987. Under this program 40 F-4Es were delivered to 131 and 132 Filo, 3 JAB, Konya. Before that, this wing was only a training unit equipped with the last Turkish F-100s. After the conversion it became an operational formation.

Turkey assisted in Desert Storm without entering the fighting directly, by opening their airbases to the Coalition air forces and hosted Belgian Mirages, German Alpha Jets and Italian F-104Gs. As a reward for their help another 40 former US Air Force Phantoms were delivered to 112 and 172 Filo, beginning on 25 March 1991. At that time, the USAF was phasing-out large quantities of older aircraft, reducing their strength by over 1,000 F-4C/D/Es. But even if old, these aircraft were desirable to countries like Turkey who already had F-4 fleets.

The U.S. did not have enough RF-4s to sell to meet international demands, so when the German Air Force phased out their remaining 88 RF-4Es during 1992–93, 32 were delivered to the THK in 1992–94. All of these went to 113 Filo, Eskişehir. Later, when 173 Filo passed their F-4Es to 172 Filo, they equipped with RF-4Es. By the end of that reorganization, Filo 171 became a ground attack unit, 172 interception and 173 reconnaissance. That delivery completed the THK F-4 fleet.

=== Operational use ===
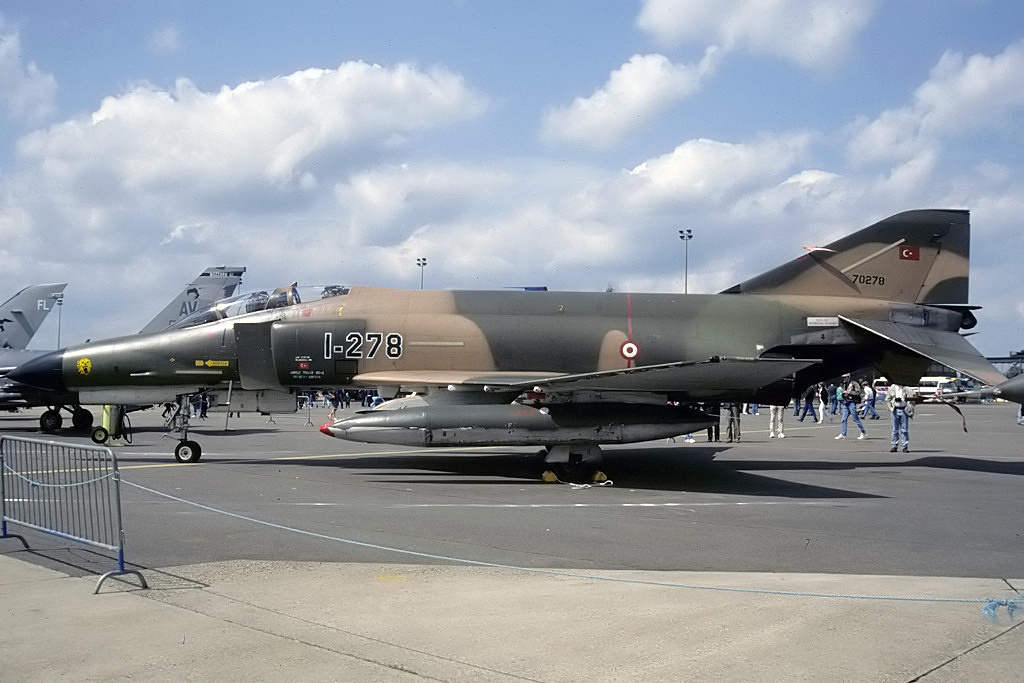
Turkish Air Force Phantom at RAF Mildenhall Air Fete 1996

Many of the Turkish Phantoms are used as ground attack aircraft, a role they performed well due to the systems installed. The first Phantoms delivered to the THK had Southeast Asia camouflage colors and TISEO equipment, consisting of a wing-mounted television camera with zoom capacity for spotting targets outside of normal visual range. The F-4s acquired from US Air Force stocks were former 110th and 141st Tactical Fighter Squadron aircraft (Missouri and New Jersey Air National Guard squadrons, respectively) and arrived painted in "Egyptian One" camouflage, an air-superiority paint scheme consisting of two different shades of blue, despite being best-suited for ground attack. The last batch delivered had AVQ-23A Pave Spike laser designation pod compatibility.

In September 2010, U.S. Army spokeswoman Lt. Col. Tamara Parker confirmed a combined Chinese-Turkish exercise that ran from 20 September through 4 October at the Konya air base in Turkey's central Anatolia region. According to Reuters, a portion of the exercise included mock aerial combat between Turkish F-4s and Russian-built Su-27s of the Chinese military. It was reported that the Turks defeated the Chinese aircraft in air combat exercises.

On 22 June 2012, the Turkish government announced that Syrian forces had shot down a Turkish RF-4E from 113 Filo with two crew members over the Mediterranean Sea off the coast of Hatay Province, which borders the Syrian Latakia Governorate. The aircraft is reported to have been conducting a reconnaissance flight off the Syrian coast. The Turkish release suggested that the Turkish government did not immediately view the Syrian action as provocative, and it acknowledged that Syrian assets were assisting efforts to find the aircraft and crew. The Syrian Armed Forces made a statement carried by the official Syrian Arab News Agency crediting its antiaircraft gunners with downing an unidentified aircraft flying at "very low altitude and at high speed" over Syria's territorial waters toward land less than a mile offshore, causing it to crash into the sea west of the village of Om al-Tuyour. Syrian Foreign Ministry spokesman Jihad Makdissi said "the downing was an accident, caused by the "automatic response" of an officer commanding an anti-aircraft gun. The man saw a jet coming at him at high speed and low altitude and opened fire, Makdissi said." The statement went on to claim that the aircraft was found to be a "Turkish military plane that entered Syrian airspace and was dealt with according to laws observed in such cases". The downing occurred at a time of heightened tensions between the two countries due to Turkish support for Syrian rebels opposed to the Bashar al-Assad regime in Damascus. On 24 June, wreckage of the F-4 was located in Syrian waters, but the crew had not been found. On 24 February 2015, two RF-4Es crashed in the Malatya region in southeast Turkey, under unknown circumstances, killing all four crew members. On 5 March 2015, an F-4E-2020 crashed in central Anatolia killing both crew. Calls to scrap the F-4s and replace them with the fifth generation F-35s were renewed.

=== Upgrades ===
Turkey considered more sophisticated supersonic fighters like the F-15 Eagle or Panavia Tornado to be too expensive; instead, the THK decided to upgrade its Phantom fleet with improvements to avionics and structure, but not to the engines. In August 1995, after a hotly contested competition with DASA (F-4 ICE), IAI was awarded a USD600M contract to upgrade 54 F-4Es to Phantom 2000s. The first 26 aircraft were rebuilt in Israel, and the other 28 in Turkey.

==== Structure ====
Small strakes above the air intakes to improve agility, new attachment fittings, engine mountings, stronger wing fold ribs, updated canopy sill bar, 12 mi (20 km) of wiring replaced (reducing weight by 1,653 lb/750 kg) as well as most hydraulic and pneumatic lines and hoses, and fuel tank reinforcements.

==== Avionics ====
New multifunction display in the front cockpit plus two in the rear, new Kaiser El-OP 976 wide-angle HUD and HOTAS system, high-performance Elta EL/M-2032 ISAR-capable high-resolution SAR/GMTI (ground moving target indicator) multi-mode fire-control radar (developed for the IAI Lavi), IAIC mission computer, new navigation equipment including GPS/INS connected to mapping mode, dual MIL-STD-553B databus managing avionics package, Astronautics Central Air Data Computer, new UHF and IFF packages, airborne video tape recorder (AVTR), Elta EL/L-8222 active ECM pod and Mikes (Aselsan) AN/ALQ-178V3 passive embedded SPEWS, and RWR.

Additionally, they had AGM-142 Popeye/Have Nap integration, Litening-II targeting pods, and the capability to launch AGM-65D/G Maverick, AGM-88 HARM, GBU-8 HOBOS, GBU-10/12 Paveway II LGBs, general purpose and cluster bombs for air-to-ground missions, while retaining the capability to launch AIM-7 Sparrow and AIM-9 Sidewinder air-to-air missiles. It is also possible to install Pave Spike targeting pods and rocket pods of all sizes.

These upgraded F-4 Phantoms are referred to as the F-4E-2020 Terminator and current planning is that they will remain in service until 2020, as the name suggests. The first entered service on 27 January 2000 with deliveries to 111 and 171 Filo.

=== Units ===
Turkish Air Force

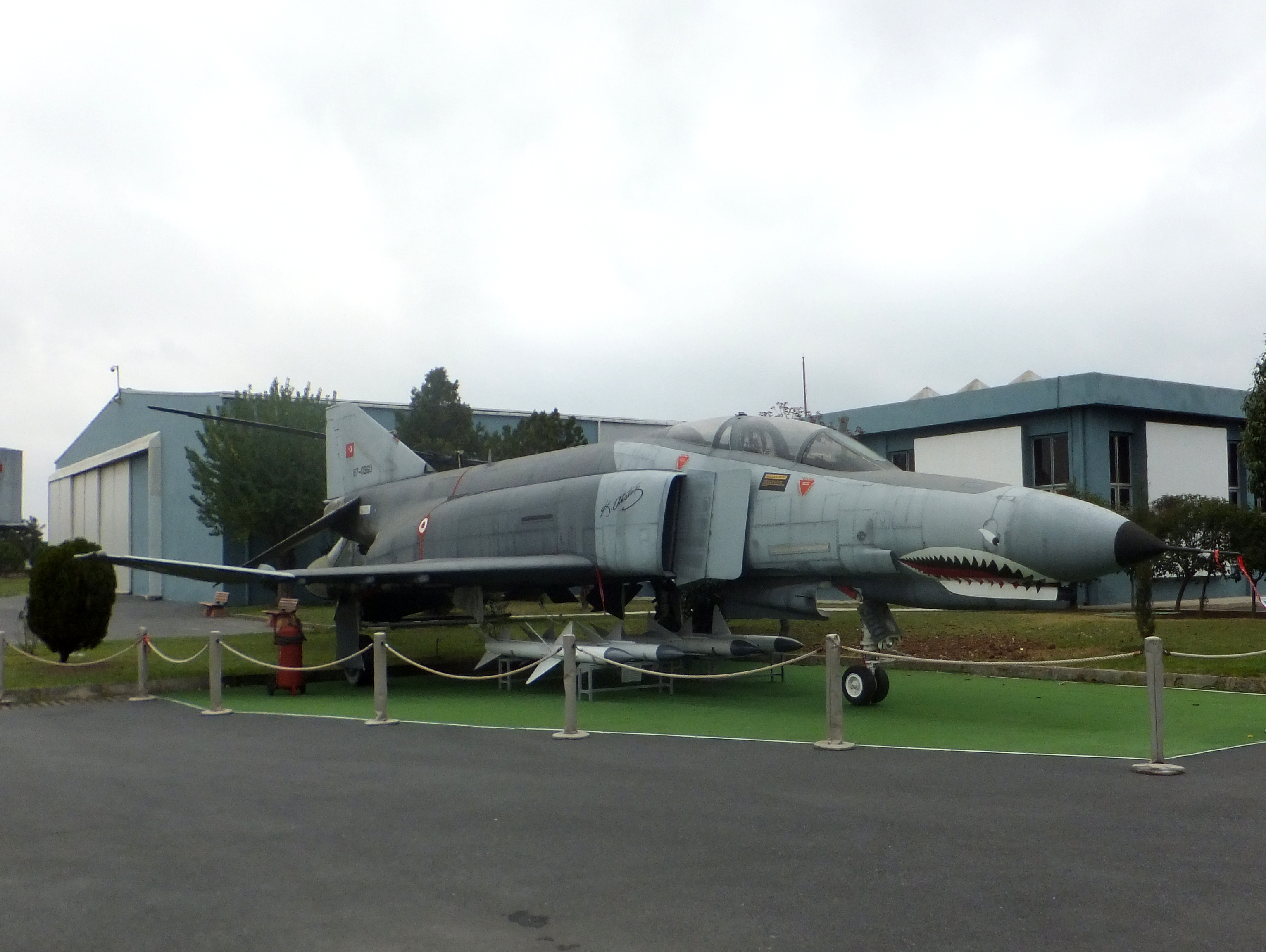
Retired Turkish Air Force F-4E Phantom II, serial number 67-0360, on display at the Istanbul Aviation Museum

At the end of the 20th century, the following THK units operated Phantoms:

- Ana Jet Üs (Jet Air Base), Eskişehir: 111 Filo "Panter" (F-4E/2020), 112 Filo "Şeytan" (F-4E), 113 Filo "Işık" (RF-4E)
- Ana Jet Üs, Konya: 132 Filo "Hançer" (F-4E/2020)
- Ana Jet Üs, Erhaç-Malatya: 171 Filo "Korsan" (F-4E/2020), 172 Filo "Şahin" (F-4E), 173 Filo "Şafak" (F-4E)
- 1st Tactical Air Force
  - 111 Filo
  - 112 Filo
  - 113 Filo
- 2nd Tactical Air Force
  - 132 Filo
  - 171 Filo
  - 172 Filo
  - 173 Filo

== United Kingdom ==
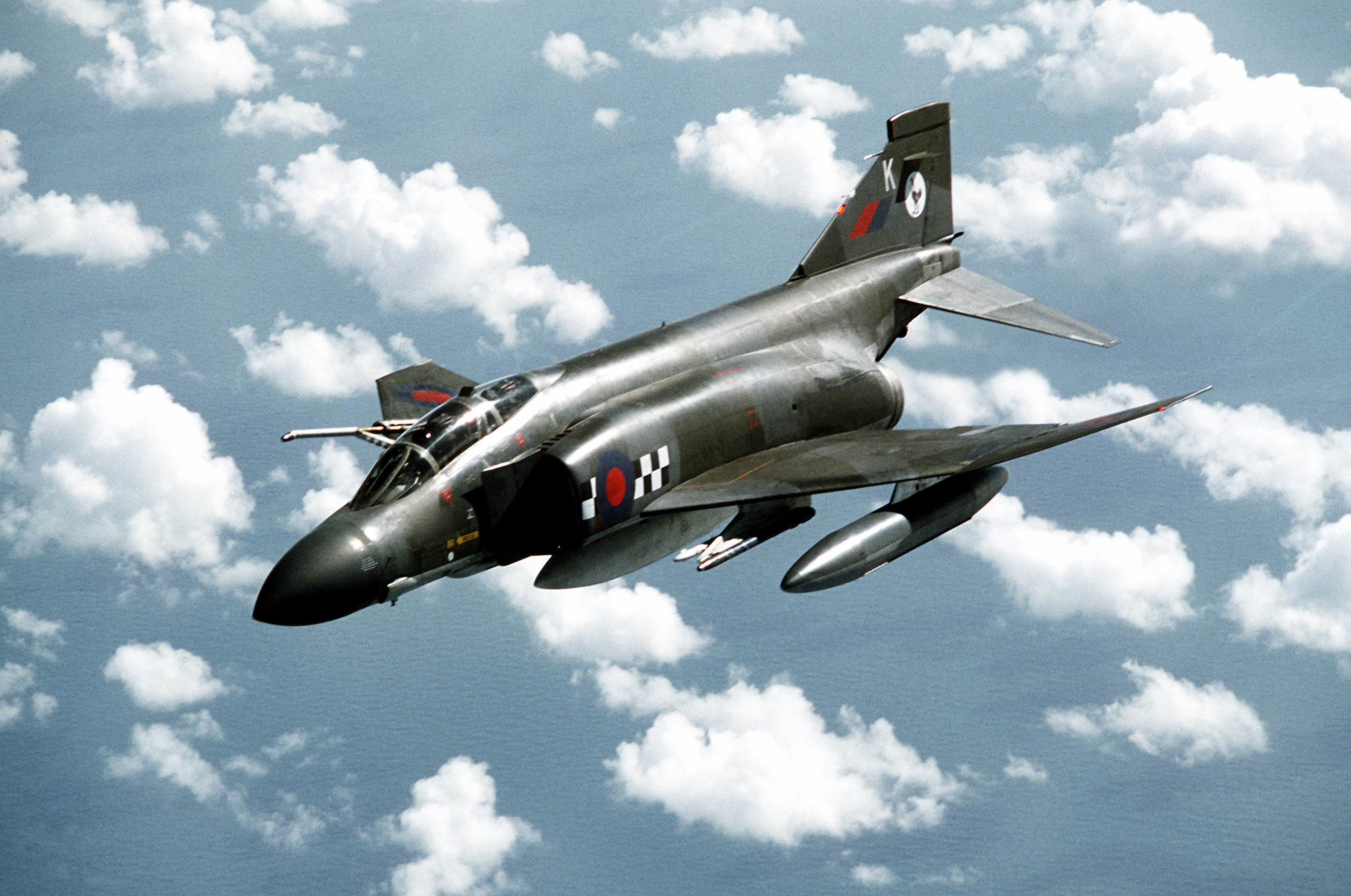
Phantom FG.1 of No. 43 Sqn. Royal Air Force. Note the rectangular box-shaped ARI 18228 radar warning receiver on the fin tip

=== F-4K (Phantom FG.1) ===
Following cancellation of the supersonic V/STOL Hawker Siddeley P.1154, the Royal Navy selected the Phantom as a replacement for the Supermarine Scimitar and de Havilland Sea Vixen. The model requested was designated the F-4K by McDonnell Douglas and received the British service designation Phantom FG.1. Ordered in July 1964, this was the first time the U.S. permitted export of the Phantom, with the first F-4K flying on 27 June 1966.

To ease the impact on employment in the UK aircraft industry from the cancellation of home-grown programs, the aircraft had a high British content. The main modification was the replacement of the General Electric J79 by the British-made Rolls-Royce Spey powerplant. These engines (RB 168-25R Spey Mk 202/203s) were more powerful than the J79s (20,515 lbf (91.26 kN) afterburning thrust) and had a lower fuel consumption (power-specific fuel consumption was around 0.7 lb/(hp⋅h) (0.43 kg/kWh)). The rear fuselage was heavily modified to accommodate the larger Speys and the air intakes enlarged to permit the greater airflow they required. These aircraft were equipped with an AN/AWG-11 radar system, which was a version of the Westinghouse AN/AWG-10 built under licence by Ferranti, equipped with a Doppler unit to allow some basic look-down capabilities. The bombing system was the anglicized version of the Lear/Siegler AN/ABJ-7. Fleet Air Arm Phantoms were fitted with a double-telescoping front landing gear strut that could extend 40 in (100 cm), the increased angle of attack being necessary for catapult launches from the smaller British carriers. Other British contractors, including Short Brothers and British Aircraft Corporation, built sub-assemblies and supplied parts to the United States where the aircraft were assembled by McDonnell Douglas at Saint Louis.

A Spey-powered Phantom was not a new concept: McDonnell Douglas had considered the idea to meet the USAF TFX requirement, later satisfied by the General Dynamics F-111. The Spey gave an increase of 10% in operational range, 15% increase in ferry range and better low-level acceleration, however the increased drag of the engine installation resulted in poorer performance at high altitude. Although some of the design changes were unique to the British aircraft – folding radar radome, Spey engine, nose-wheel extension and strengthened arrester hook – the other structural changes and improvements were used in the design of the F-4J. After modifications in the 1970s, the tail had a new RWR system; a British-made Marconi ARI.18228 fitted in a rectangular antenna box on the fin tip.

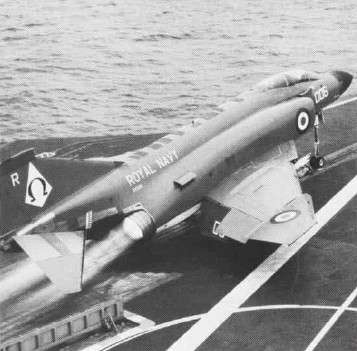
A Phantom FG.1 of 892 Naval Air Squadron launching from HMS Ark Royal

Initially, a total of 140 FG.1s were to be ordered for the Fleet Air Arm; the intention was to operate the Phantom from both of the Royal Navy's remaining large fleet carriers, Eagle and Ark Royal, and the brand new CVA-01 carriers. However, the 1966 Defence White Paper saw the cancellation of the CVA-01 project, with the Royal Navy's Phantom order cut to 48. This was intended to provide for two squadrons each of 12 aircraft to be operated from Eagle and Ark Royal, both of which were to be heavily modified. While Ark Royal was undergoing conversion, the FG.1 underwent successful deck trials aboard Eagle. In 1969, however, the decision was taken that Eagle would not undergo conversion, leaving Ark Royal as the only Royal Navy carrier capable of operating the Phantom. As a consequence, 20 of the Fleet Air Arm's FG.1s were diverted to the Royal Air Force to equip No. 43 Squadron at RAF Leuchars in the air-defence role. These aircraft were modified to enable them to carry the SUU-23/A gun pods. The units equipped were 700P Naval Air Squadron trials unit, 767 Naval Air Squadron training unit, and a single operational squadron, 892 Naval Air Squadron, all home based at Yeovilton. 892 NAS commissioned with the Phantom in 1969, and embarked in Ark Royal for the first time in 1970, making the Fleet Air Arm the only naval air arm outside the United States to operate the Phantom from the deck of an aircraft carrier.

Service with the Fleet Air Arm was brief, with 892 NAS operating from Ark Royal from 12 June 1970 to 27 November 1978. After that, the remaining FG.1s were transferred to the RAF to form No. 111 Squadron, a second air-defence squadron. The two RAF squadrons converted to the Tornado F.3 in 1989 when the FG.1s were withdrawn from service.

=== F-4M (Phantom FGR.2) ===
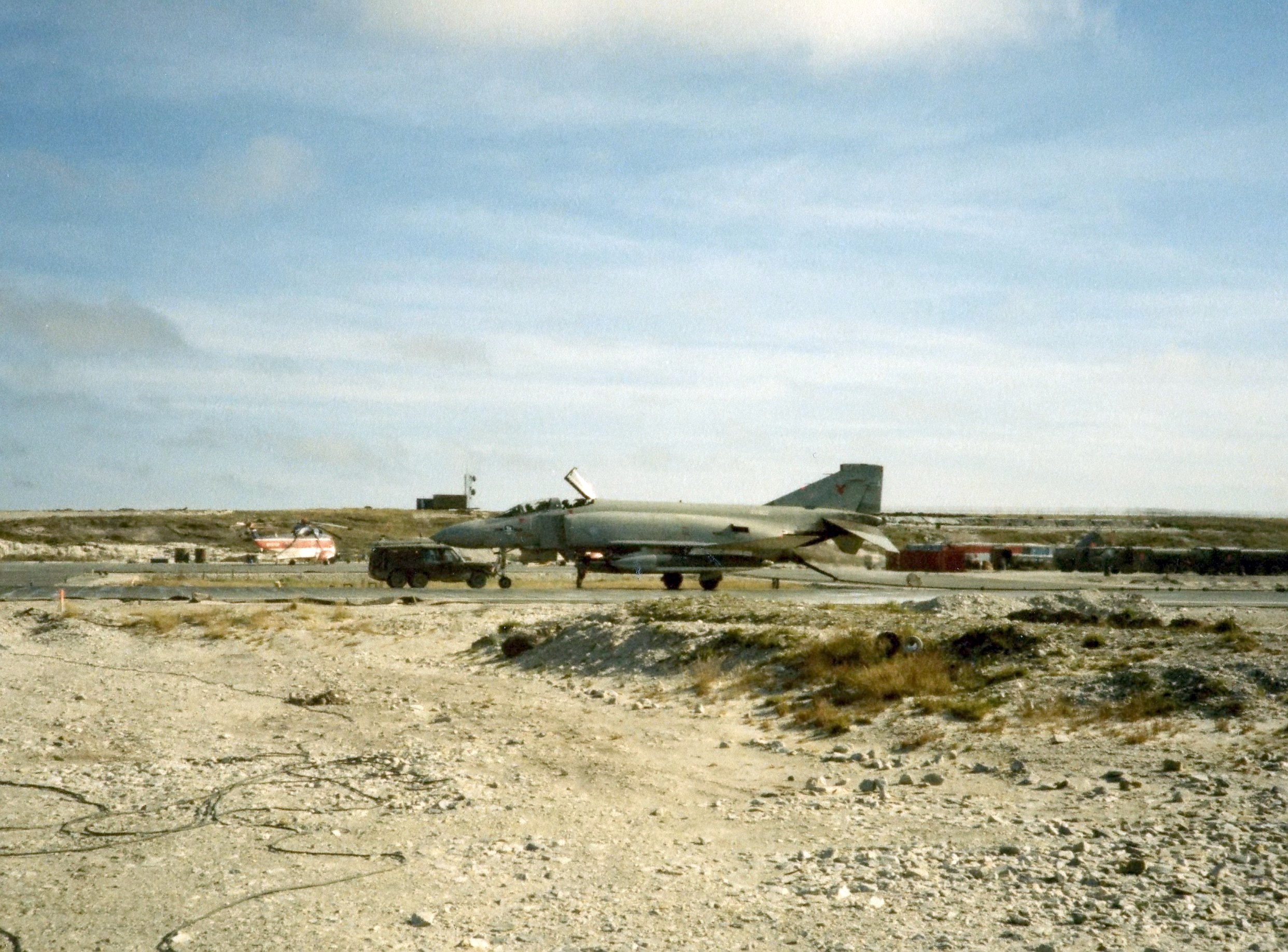
A 23 Squadron Phantom FGR.2 in the Falkland Islands, 1984

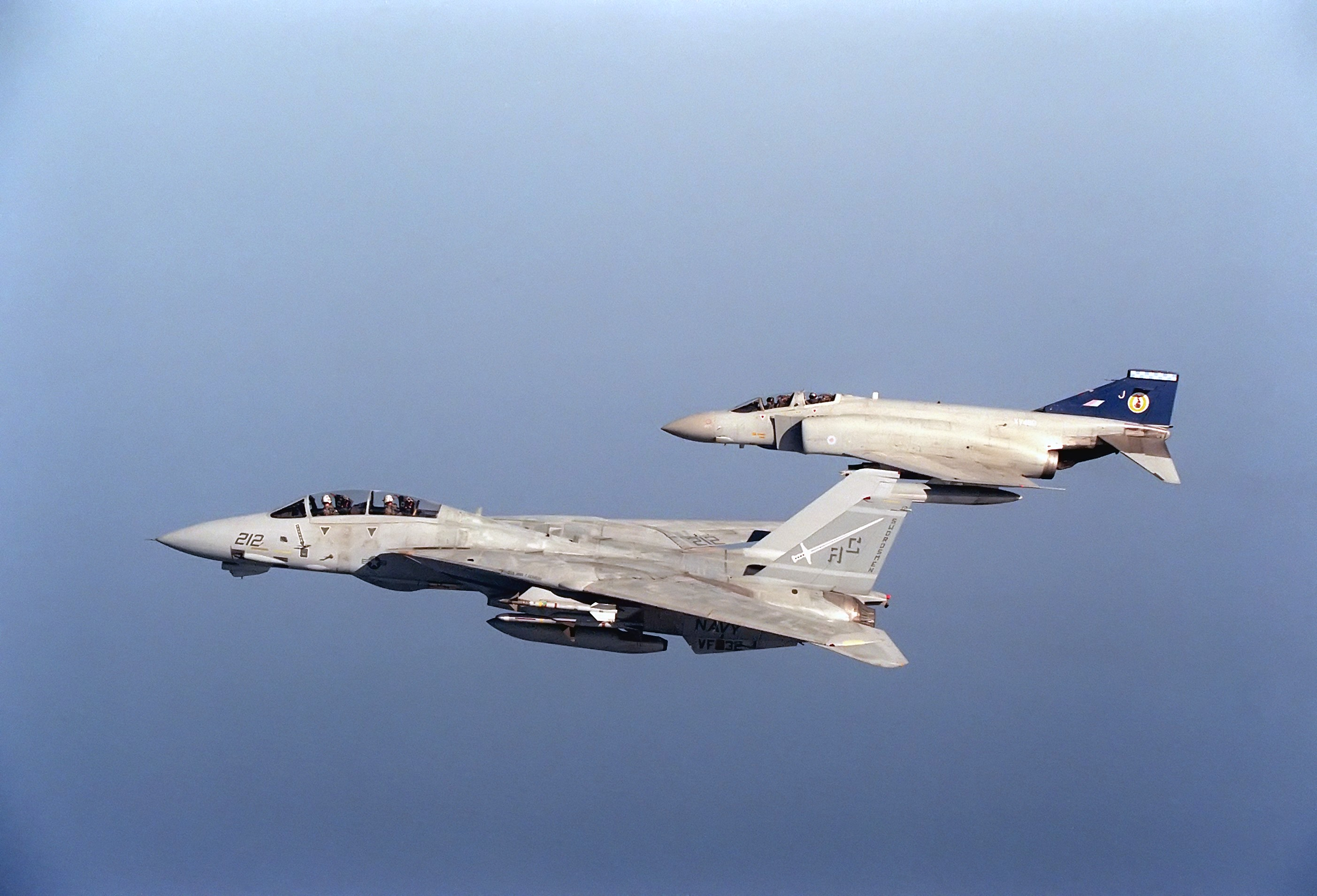
U.S. Navy Grumman F-14 Tomcat and a British Phantom FGR.2 during Desert Shield. This photo shows the many design differences between these two generations of combat aircraft

With the cancellation of home-grown programmes and the need to replace the Hawker Hunter and English Electric Canberra in the ground-attack and tactical reconnaissance roles, the RAF ordered 118 aircraft in 1965. The aircraft were designated Phantom FGR.2 ("Fighter/Ground attack/Reconnaissance") by the British and the prototype first flew on 17 February 1967. Like the Phantom FG.1 it was equipped with Spey engines and was externally identical, although it did not have the extendable nose-wheel. It was fitted with an AN/AWG-12 radar and fire-control system, similar to the AN/AWG-11 but without the ability to fold the radome and antenna back to enable the aircraft to fit the lifts on an aircraft carrier, and Martin-Baker Mk.H5 ejection seats. The aircraft entered service from 1969 onwards with Nos. 2, 6, 14, 17, 31, 41 and 54 Squadrons in the close air support, tactical strike and tactical reconnaissance roles. However, when the SEPECAT Jaguar entered service from 1974 onwards, the Phantom FGR.2s were redeployed in the air defence role, replacing English Electric Lightnings with Nos. 19, 23, 29, 56 and 92 Squadrons.

Some FGR.2s were equipped with dual controls, and others could carry a reconnaissance pod that was equipped with a Texas Instruments RS-700 infrared linescan unit, high-definition sideways-looking radar and five optical cameras. It was also equipped with an inertial navigation system, radar warning receiver, and an electronic identification system known as the "Jubilee Guardsman". Although not deployed in a war role, RAF Phantoms were involved in air-defence duties on Quick Reaction Alert. This involved endless alarms to intercept "Bear" and other Soviet aircraft approaching British airspace, the North Sea and over Germany. The fitting of RWRs and structural reinforcements were carried out to the aircraft in the 1970s.

In 1982, an AIM-9-armed Phantom FGR.2 returning from a Quick Reaction Alert over Germany accidentally shot down a Royal Air Force Jaguar GR.1.

In the strike role the FGR.2s could carry the SNEB rocket pod, 1,000 lb (450 kg) bomb, the BL755 Cluster Bomb Unit, and U.S.-supplied B28, B43, B57 or B61 nuclear weapons. It could also be fitted with SUU-16/A and SUU-23/A gun pods. From 1975 the aircraft were modified with structural reinforcements and tail-mounted ARI 18228 radar warning receivers. When the aircraft took over the air-defence duties in the 1970s they carried either AIM-9G Sidewinders or AIM-7 Sparrows, and later they would carry the then new British Aerospace Skyflash missile and the updated AIM-9L Sidewinder. In the 1980s, the Tornado started to replace the Phantom in the air-defence role.

The Greek Air Force (Polemiki Aeroporia, PA) was interested in buying 32 aircraft in 1992 but the differences were too great between the FGR.2 and the F-4Es they operated.

=== F-4J(UK) (Phantom F.3) ===
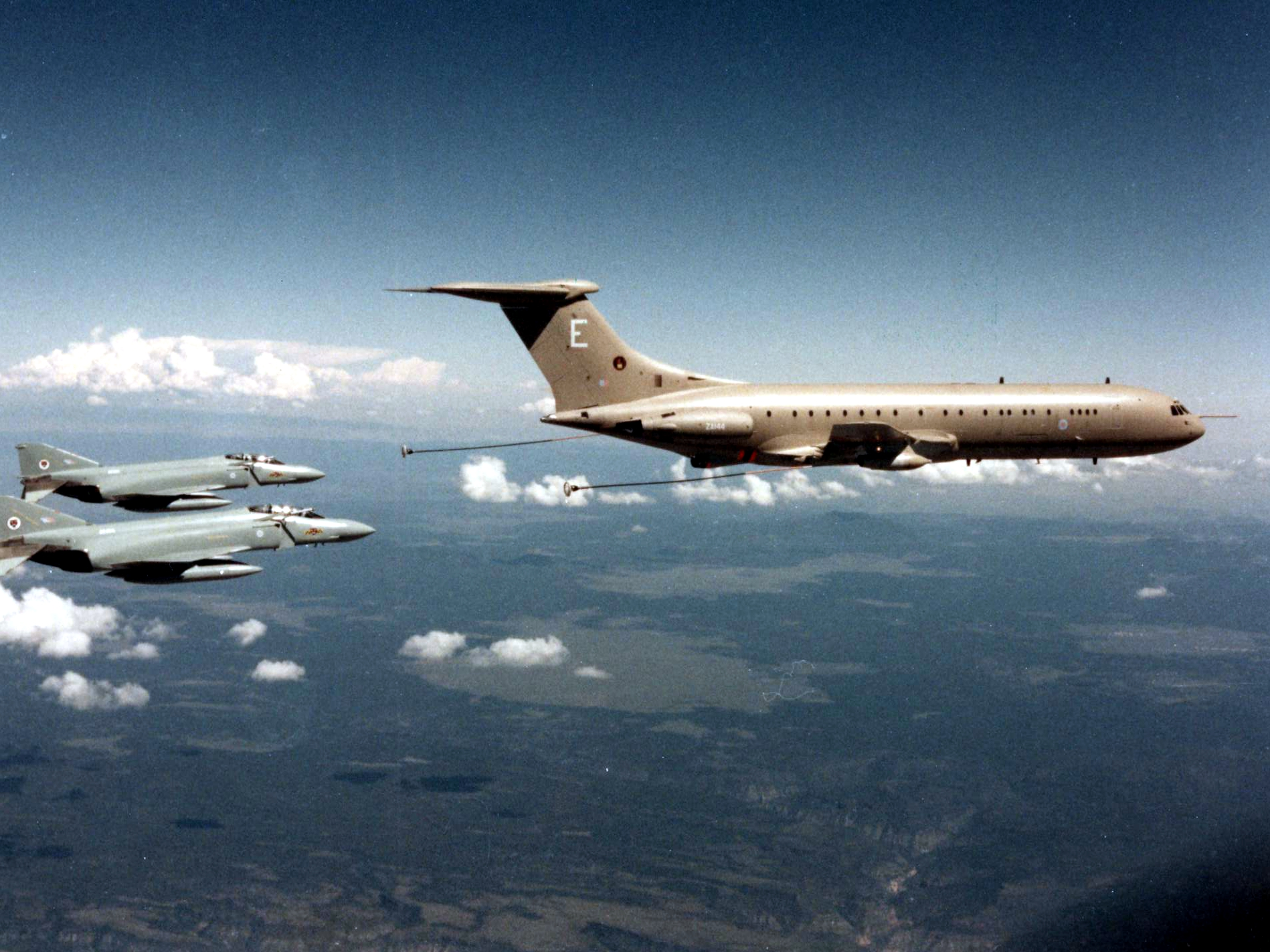
A pair of Phantom F.3s taking on fuel from a VC10 tanker during a delivery flight to the UK in 1984

The deployment of a squadron of Phantom FGR.2s to the Falkland Islands after the 1982 War left a gap in the RAF's air defences. With the Tornado ADV still some years from operational service, the RAF purchased 15 second-hand former U.S. Navy F-4J aircraft, chosen from among the best stored at Davis-Monthan Air Force Base and upgraded to a level almost equal to the F-4S. Although they were officially designated as the Phantom F.3, this was rarely used, instead being generally referred to as the F-4J(UK). The main difference was the absence of combat slats as requested by the RAF, since they were considered to be a "source of drag".

This also simplified the training of RAF crews as slats were not fitted to other RAF Phantoms. The aircraft were totally overhauled at Naval Air Station North Island and fitted with AWG-10B radar (having Skyflash missile guidance capability, with monopulse I band sensor), smokeless engines and provision for Skyflash missiles. The first F-4J(UK) was delivered to the RAF on 2 August 1984 and from there RAF crews delivered the aircraft to the UK after training.

They entered service with No. 74 Squadron (Tiger Squadron), based at RAF Wattisham in the air-defence role. Crews liked the aircraft, and generally rated them better than the Spey-equipped FGR.2s. They had a slower rate of climb due to the less-powerful engines, but they were also 1,670 lb (760 kg) lighter and able, at altitude, to reach higher speeds (Mach 2.3 at 45,000 ft (14,000 m), compared to Mach 2.1 at 36,000 ft (11,000 m)). The radar was also praised: "engines are good and the radar is excellent" in the words of a pilot. Despite their age and the lack of combat slats these aircraft served well until being phased out in January 1991 in favour of surplus Phantom FGR.2s, before the Phantom was finally retired in 1992.

After 25 years of service the Phantoms ended their RAF career: as a result of the Options for Change military budget reduction in 1990, it was decided to phase out the Phantom. Originally to be used until 2003, it was set back to 1992. These aircraft were designed for a lifetime of only 1,000 hours but were pushed to 5,800 hours, many of them flown at low-level. First units to disband were the RAF Wildenrath-based 19 and 92 Squadrons, which were the last air defence units to serve in RAF Germany, followed by 56 Squadron in May 1992. The last Phantom squadron, 74 Squadron was disbanded on 1 October 1992.

=== Units ===
Royal Navy Fleet Air Arm

- 700P Naval Air Squadron
- 767 Naval Air Squadron
- 892 Naval Air Squadron
- Phantom Post-Operational Conversion Unit

Royal Air Force

- No. 2 Squadron
- No. 6 Squadron
- No. 14 Squadron
- No. 17 Squadron
- No. 19 Squadron
- No. 23 Squadron
- No. 29 Squadron
- No. 31 Squadron
- No. 41 Squadron
- No. 43 Squadron
- No. 54 Squadron
- No. 56 Squadron
- No. 64 Squadron/No. 228 Operational Conversion Unit
- No. 74 Squadron
- No. 92 Squadron
- No. 111 Squadron
- No. 1435 Flight
- Phantom Training Flight
- Phantom Conversion Flight
- Aeroplane and Armament Experimental Establishment

== See also ==
- F-4 Phantom II
- F-4 Phantom II variants
- F-4 Phantom II U.S. operators
