= Structure of the Hellenic Air Force =

The article provides an overview of the entire chain of command and organization of the Hellenic Air Force as of 2018 and includes all currently active units. The Hellenic Air Force is commanded by the Chief of the Air Force General Staff in Athens.

The source for this article is the organization sections on the website of the Hellenic Air Force.

== Administrative Organization ==
The Hellenic Air Force is overseen by the Ministry of National Defense under the Minister of Defense Nikos Dendias.

- Ministry of National Defence, in Athens
  - Air Force General Staff, at Papagou Military Base
    - Air Force Tactical Command (Αρχηγείο Τακτικής Αεροπορίας, ATA), at Larissa Air Base
    - Air Force Training Command (Διοίκηση Αεροπορικής Εκπαίδευσης, ΔΑΕ), at Dekelia Air Base
    - Air Force Support Command (Διοίκηση Αεροπορικής Υποστήριξης, ΔΑΥ), at Elefsina Air Base

== Air Force General Staff ==
The Air Force General Staff based at Papagou Military Base is structured as follows:

- Air Force General Staff, at Papagou Military Base
  - A Branch (Operations)
    - A1 Directorate (Operations Planning - Operations)
    - A3 Directorate (Exercises - Operational Training)
    - A4 Directorate (Air Defense)
    - A7 Directorate (Intelligence - Information Security)
    - Operational Center
  - B Branch (Personnel - Training)
    - B1 Directorate (Military Personnel)
    - B2 Directorate (Training)
    - B3 (Personnel Management)
    - B4 (Military Recruitment)
    - B5 Directorate (Civilian Personnel)
  - C Branch (Support)
    - C1 Directorate (Aircraft - Armament)
    - C2 Directorate (Infrastructure)
    - C4 Directorate (Communications)
    - C5 Directorate (Information Technology)
    - C7 Directorate (Supply)
  - D Branch (Policy and Development)
    - D1 Directorate (Organization)
    - D2 Directorate (Defense Planning and Programming)
    - D3 Directorate (Armament Programs)
    - D6 Directorate (Financial Services)

The Air Force General Staff commands the following units and services:

- Air Force General Staff, at Papagou Military Base
  - Air Force Academy, at Dekelia Air Base
    - 360th Squadron "Thales" – (T-41D Mescalero)
  - 251st General Aviation Hospital, in Athens
  - Fuel Pipeline Management, in Eleftherio Larissa
    - Fuel Base Antikyra
    - Fuel Base Mikrothives
    - Fuel Base Triadi
    - Fuel Unit Aliartos
    - Fuel Unit Modi
    - Fuel Unit Rachon
  - Aviation Medicine Center, in Athens
  - Supreme Air Force Medical Committee, in Athens
  - Air Force Project Service, at Papagou Military Base
  - Air Force Finance & Accounting Center, at Papagou Military Base
  - Air Force General Staff Support Squadron, at Papagou Military Base
  - Air Force General Staff Computer Center, at Papagou Military Base
  - Air Force Military Police, in Vyronas
  - 31st Search and Rescue Operations Squadron, at Elefsina Air Base (Special Forces)
  - National Meteorological Service, in Ellinikon
  - Air Traffic Information Service, at the Hellenic Civil Aviation Authority in Glyfada
  - Air Force Insurance Service, in Athens
  - Air Force Materiel Audit Authority, in Ampelokipoi
  - Air Force Audit Authority Athens, in Ampelokipoi
  - Air Force Audit Authority Larissa, in Larissa
  - Air Force Treasury Service, in Athens
  - Joint Rescue Control Center / Air Force Service, at the Hellenic Coast Guard headquarter in Piraeus

=== Hellenic Tactical Air Force ===
The Hellenic Tactical Air Force based at Larissa Air Base is structured as follows:

- Hellenic Tactical Air Force, at Larissa Air Base
  - A Branch (Operations)
    - A1 Directorate (Operations Planning - Operations)
    - A3 Directorate (Exercises - Allied Affairs)
    - A4 Directorate (Air Defense Survival)
    - A7 Directorate (Information Security)
  - B Branch (Personnel)
    - B1 Directorate (Military Personnel - Personnel Management)
    - B2 Directorate (Education)
    - B5 Directorate (Civilian Personnel)
  - C Branch (Support)
    - C1 Directorate (Aircraft - Armament)
    - C2 Directorate (Infrastructure)
    - C3 Directorate (Financial Service)
    - C4 Directorate (Communications, Information Technology & Electronic Equipment)
    - C7 Directorate (Supply)
Main flying bases of the Hellenic Air Force 2018:
F-16 Falcon Mirage 2000 & Rafale F-4 Phantom II
T-2E Buckeye/T-6A Texan II Rotational fighter deployments
Airport detachments other flying units
Hellenic Air Force control and warning stations
Control and Warning (Radar) station Command and Control Center
Guided Missile Squadron

The Air Force Tactical Command commands the following units:

- Air Force Tactical Command, at Larissa Air Base
  - Air Operations Center, at Larissa Air Base, reports to NATO's Integrated Air Defense System CAOC Torrejón in Spain
  - 1st Area Control Centre, inside Mount Chortiatis
  - 2nd Area Control Centre, inside Mount Parnitha
  - Air Tactics Center, at Andravida Air Base
    - Fighter Weapons School
    - Electronic Warfare School
    - Joint Electronic Warfare School
    - Air to Ground Operations School
    - Tactical Support Squadron
  - 110th Combat Wing, at Larissa Air Base
    - 337th Squadron "Ghost" – (F-16C/D Block 52+)
    - Unmanned Aircraft Squadron "Acheron" – (Pegasus II)
  - 111th Combat Wing, at Nea Anchialos Air Base
    - 330th Squadron "Thunder" – (F-16C/D Block 30)
    - 341st Squadron "Arrow" – (F-16C/D Block 50 in the Suppression of Enemy Air Defense role)
    - 347th Squadron "Perseus" – (F-16C/D Block 50)
  - 114th Combat Wing, at Tanagra Air Base
    - 331st All Weather Squadron "Theseus" – (Mirage 2000-5 Mk3)
    - 332nd All Weather Squadron "Hawk" – (Rafale F3R)
  - 115th Combat Wing, at Souda Air Base, Crete
    - 340th Squadron "Fox" – (F-16C/D Block 52+)
    - 343rd Squadron "Star" – (F-16C/D Block 52+)
  - 116th Combat Wing, at Araxos Air Base
    - 335th Bomber Squadron "Tiger" – (F-16C/D Block 52+ Advanced)
    - 336th Bomber Squadron "Olympus" – (F-16C/D Block 52+ Advanced)
  - 117th Combat Wing, at Andravida Air Base
    - 338th Fighter-Bomber Squadron "Ares" – (F-4E PI2000 Phantom II)
  - 350th Guided Missile Wing, at Sedes Air Base
    - 11th Guided Missile Squadron, at Heraklion Air Base – (S-300 PMU-1, TOR M1)
    - 21st Guided Missile Squadron, in Keratea – (MIM-104 Patriot PAC-3)
    - 22nd Guided Missile Squadron, at Skyros Air Base – (MIM-104 Patriot PAC-3)
    - 23rd Guided Missile Squadron, at Sedes Air Base – (MIM-104 Patriot PAC-3)
    - 24th Guided Missile Squadron, at Tympaki Air Base – (MIM-104 Patriot PAC-3)
    - 25th Guided Missile Squadron, at Chrysoupoli Air Base – (MIM-104 Patriot PAC-3, TOR M1)
    - 26th Guided Missile Squadron, at Tanagra Air Base – (MIM-104 Patriot PAC-3, Crotale NG/GR)
    - Guided Missile Maintenance Squadron, at Sedes Air Base
    - Guided Missile Training Squadron, at Sedes Air Base
  - 130th Combat Group, at Lemnos Air Base (rotational deployment of F-16 fighters and AS332C1 Super Puma SAR helicopters)
  - 133rd Combat Group, at Kasteli Air Base (rotational deployment of F-16 fighters)
  - 135th Combat Group, at Skyros Air Base (rotational deployment of F-16 or Mirage-2000-5 fighters)
  - 140th Operational Intelligence & Electronic Warfare Group, at Larissa Air Base
  - 1st Control and Warning Station Squadron, in Didymoteicho
  - 2nd Control and Warning Station Squadron, on Mount Ismaros
  - 3rd Control and Warning Station Squadron, on Mount Vitsi
  - 4th Control and Warning Station Squadron, on Mount Elati
  - 5th Control and Warning Station Squadron, in Kissamos
  - 6th Control and Warning Station Squadron, on Mykonos
  - 7th Control and Warning Station Squadron, on Mount Mela
  - 8th Control and Warning Station Squadron, on Lemnos
  - 9th Control and Warning Station Squadron, on Mount Pelion
  - 10th Control and Warning Station Squadron, on Mount Chortiatis
  - 11th Control and Warning Station Squadron, in Ziros
  - 380th Airborne Early Warning & Control Squadron "Uranos", at Elefsina Air Base – (Erieye EMB-145H AEW&C)
  - Air Defense Information Center, at the Hellenic Civil Aviation Authority in Glyfada
  - Instrument Flight Training Center, at Larissa Air Base
  - Meteorological Center, at Larissa Air Base
  - Aktion Airport Detachment
  - Karpathos Airport Detachment
  - Chrysoupoli Airport Detachment

==== Air Force Tactical Command Structure Graphic ====
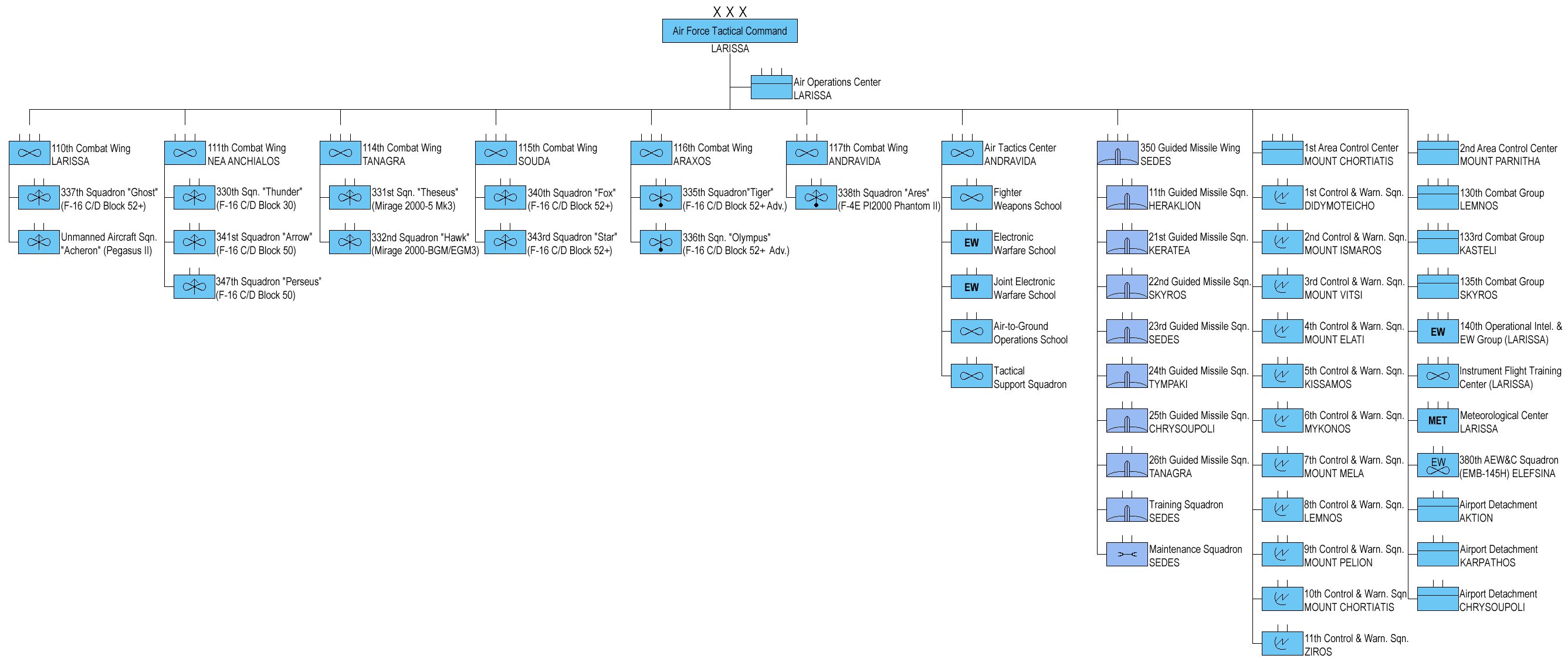
Air Force Tactical Command Structure 2018

=== Air Force Support Command ===
The Air Force Support Command based at Elefsina Air Base is structured as follows:

- Air Force Support Command, at Elefsina Air Base
  - A Branch (Operations)
    - A1 Directorate (Operations Planning - Operations)
    - A8 Directorate (Education)
    - A10 Directorate (Military Personnel)
    - A11 Directorate (Civilian Personnel)
    - Operations Center
  - C Branch (Support)
    - C1 Directorate (Transportation Support - Training Support)
    - C2 Directorate (Infrastructure)
    - C3 Directorate (Financial Service)
    - C4 Directorate (Communications, Information Technology & Electronic Equipment)
    - C7 Directorate (Supply Transport)
    - C8 Directorate (Fighter Support - Armament)
    - C9 Directorate (Quality Assurance)
    - C10 Directorate (Factory Support)

The Air Force Support Command commands the following units:

- Air Force Support Command, at Elefsina Air Base
  - 112th Combat Wing, at Elefsina Air Base
    - 352nd VIP Transport Squadron "Cosmos" – (EMB-135LR EMB-135BJ, Gulfstream V, AB 212)
    - 354th Tactical Transport Squadron "Pegasus" – (C-27J Spartan)
    - 355th Tactical Transport Squadron "Atlas" – (CL-215)
    - 356th Tactical Transport Squadron "Hercules" – (C-130H Hercules)
    - 358th Search and Rescue Squadron" "Phaethon" – (Bell-205A1, AB 212, AW-109E)
    - 384th Search and Rescue Squadron "Puma" – (AS-332C1 Super Puma)
  - 113th Combat Wing, at Sedes Air Base
    - 383rd Special Operations & Air Fire Fighting Squadron "Proteus" – (CL-415GR, CL-415MP)
  - 206th Infrastructure Wing, in Ano Liosia
    - Construction Wing (Planning)
    - Construction Squadron
    - Mobile Electrical Repair Group
    - Mobile Underwater Plant Maintenance Group
    - Mobile Disaster Response Team
    - Mobile Aircraft Shelter Maintenance Team
    - Mobile Runway Maintenance Team
    - Mobile Air Conditioning Maintenance Team
  - State Aircraft Factory, at Elefsina Air Base
  - Telecommunications and Electronic Equipment Plant, in Glyfada
  - Transport and Ground Equipment Plant, in Araxos
  - Air Force Calibration Service, in Vyronas
  - 201st Central Supply Depot, at Elefsina Air Base
    - Main Repairable Materials Supply Depot, at Tanagra Air Base
    - Main Supply Depot, in Araxos
    - Main Supply Depot, in Valanidia
  - 204th Ammunition Supply Depot, in Avlida
  - 359th Public Services Air Support Squadron, at Dekelia Air Base (Fire fighting) (M18-B and M18-BS)
  - Air Force Personnel Service Group, in Athens (Commissary management)
  - Air Force Purchasing Service, in Ambelokipi
  - Rhodes Airport Detachment
  - Santorini Airport Detachment
  - Air Force Publication Agency, at Dekelia Air Base
  - Air Force Agency at Hellenic Aerospace Industry, in Tanagra

=== Air Force Training Command ===
The Air Force Training Command based at Larissa Air Base is structured as follows:

- Air Force Training Command, at Dekelia Air Base
  - B Branch (Personnel - Training)
    - B1 Directorate (Military Personnel - Staff Selection)
    - B2 Directorate (Ground Training - Military Schools)
    - B5 Directorate (Civilian Personnel)
    - B6 Directorate (Air Training - Operations - Exercises)
    - B7 Directorate (Standardization - Staff Evaluation - Inspections)
  - C Branch (Support)
    - C1 Directorate (Aircraft - Armament)
    - C2 Directorate (Infrastructure)
    - C3 Directorate (Financial Service)
    - C7 Directorate (Supply)

The Air Force Training Command commands the following units:

- Air Force Training Command, at Dekelia Air Base
  - 120th Air Training Wing, at Kalamata Air Base
    - 361st Air Training Squadron "Mystras" – (T-6A Texan II)
    - 362nd Air Training Squadron "Nestor" – (T-2E Buckeye)
    - 363rd Air Training Squadron "Danaos" – (T-2E Buckeye)
    - 364th Air Training Squadron "Pelops" – (T-6A Texan II)
    - Sea Survival Training School
    - International Flight Training Center
  - 124th Basic Training Wing, in Tripoli
  - 123rd Technical Training Group, at Dekelia Air Base
    - Air Defense Training Center
    - Air Force Museum
    - Air Force History Museum
  - 128th Telecommunication & Electronics Training Group, in Kavouri
    - Information Technology
    - Telecommunication School
    - Radar School
    - Radio Navigation School
  - Air Force Command & Staff College, at Dekelia Air Base
    - Air Force Command and Staff Course
    - Air Force Junior Officers School
    - Foreign Languages School
    - Flight and Ground Safety School
    - Accident Prevention School
    - Training Administration School
    - Intelligence Officers School
    - Nuclear Biological and Chemical Defense School
    - Human Performance in Military Aviation School
  - Air Force NCO School, at Dekelia Air Base
    - Technical NCO Academy
    - Radio Navigators Academy
    - Administrative NCO Academy, at Sedes Air Base
  - Dog Training Center, in Koropi
