= List of Greek military bases =

This is a list of modern Greek military bases in Greece that are operated by the Military of Greece:

== Army bases ==
- Larissa 39°37′53″N 22°24′27″E
- Kozani 40°17′36″N 21°46′43″E
- Koufovouno 41°21′01.5″N 26°25′13″E
- Alexandroupoli 40°51′47″N 25°51′56″E
- Megalo Pefko 38°00′26″N 23°25′44″E
- Pachi 37°58′50″N 23°23′12″E

== Naval bases ==
- Corfu
- Myrina 39°52′15″N 25°03′19″E
- Samothrace
- Salamis Naval Base 37°58′10″N 23°31′40″E
- Souda Bay (Crete Naval Base) 35°29′46.5″N 24°08′51.5″E
- SDAM (ex-NATO COMEDEAST) Agia Paraskevi 38°00′17″N 23°50′21″E
- Navy radio station 38°09′12.6″N 024°01′40″E
- Agia Marina 38°11′28″N 024°03′48″E
- Troulos Aeginas 37°45′55″N 023°33′27.5″E
- Kiriamadi 35°18′05″N 26°17′34″E

== Air bases ==
- Andravida military airport
- Araxos military airport – GPA, Greece, Patras
- Eleusis military base 38°03′50″N 23°33′21″E
- Tanagra military airport 38°20′23″N 23°33′52″E
- Tatoi Air Base
- Larissa Air Base
- Souda Air Base
- Sedes Air Base (Mikra)
- Tripoli Air Base
- Lemnos Air Base
- Skyros Air Base 38°58′03″N 24°29′02″E
- Kasteli Air Base
- Agrinio Air Base
- Aktion Air Base
- Rhodes Maritsa Airport

== See also ==
- List of military bases
