= Peloponnese Airport =

Airports in Peloponnese

Peloponnese Airport may refer to one of the airports listed below.

- Araxos Airport, serving Patras
- Kalamata International Airport, serving Kalamata

Military airports:

- Andravida Air Base
- Sparti Airport
- Tripoli Airport

Closed airports:

- Porto Cheli Airport, a private airport located near Porto Cheli
- Triodos Airport
