= List of surviving Republic F-84 Thunderjets =

A total of 4457 Republic F-84 Thunderjet jet fighters were built, serving with 14 airforces. Many examples are preserved and on display around the world, often in aviation museums.

== Surviving aircraft ==
=== Belgium ===
F-84E

- 51-9581 on display at Spitfire Museum Florennes Air Base as 3R-B, former RNLAF "TP-6".
- 51-9599 on display at Kleine Brogel Air Museum; repainted as "FS-17 DMB".

F-84G

- 51-10667 on display at Royal Museum of the Armed Forces and Military History incorrectly marked as "3R-E FS-153".

=== Croatia ===
F-84G

- 10676 Ex-USAF – Rijeka Airport, Omišalj.

=== Denmark ===
F-84G

- 51-9792/KP-K – Danmarks Flymuseum, Stauning Airport. Tail from 51-10094.
- 51-9966/KR-A – Aalborg Defence and Garrison Museum, Aalborg.
- 51-10622/KU-U – Aalborg Defence and Garrison Museum
- 51-10777- A-777/SY-H – Danmarks Tekniske Museum, Helsingør.
- KP-X – Danish Collection of Vintage Aircraft, Skjern.

=== France ===
- 51-10809 on display at Ailes Anciennes as FS-437 at Toulouse–Blagnac Airport.
- 51-10885 – 3-XI, on display at Savigny-lès-Beaune.
- 9978 – KP-X, ex Danish AF on display at Savigny-lès-Beaune

=== Greece ===
F-84G

- 51-9752 – on display at Larissa Air Base.
- 51-10822 – "998" on display at Hellenic Air Force Museum, Dekelia Air Base.

=== Italy ===
F-84G

- MM111049 – Italian Air Force Museum, Vigna di Valle.

=== Netherlands ===
F-84E

- 51-9591 – TP-2, Fuselage only; stored at Nationaal Militair Museum, Soesterberg.

F-84G

- 51-10806 – K-171/DU-24 Nationaal Militair Museum, Soesterberg.
- 51-16727 – K-167/TB-22 Gate Guard at Eindhoven Air Base.

=== Norway ===
F-84G

- 51-9803 – FN-T, Dakota Norway, Sandefjord Airport, Torp; ex-Royal Danish Air Force A-803.
- 51-10161 – MU-Z, Flyhistorisk Museum, Sola, Stavanger Airport, Sola, near Stavanger.
- 51-11209 – MU-5, Forsvarets flysamling Gardermoen, Oslo Airport, Gardermoen near Oslo.
- 52-2912 – MU-J, Ørland Main Air Station.
- 52-8465 – MU-P, Royal Norwegian Air Force Museum, Bodø

=== Portugal ===
F-84G

- 5131 – Museu do Ar, Sintra Air Base, Sintra.
- 5201 – Military and Technical Training Center of the Air Force, Ota (Alenquer)

=== Serbia ===
F-84G

- 10501 – Ex-USAF 52-2936, c/n 3050-1855B Museum of Aviation, Nikola Tesla Airport, Belgrade
- 10525 – Ex-USAF 52-2939, c/n 3050-1858B Museum of Aviation, Nikola Tesla Airport, Belgrade
- 10530 – Ex-USAF 52-8435, c/n 3250-2260B Museum of Aviation, Nikola Tesla Airport, Belgrade

=== Slovenia ===
F-84G

- 10642 Ex-USAF 52-2910, c/n 3050-1829B – Park of Military History Pivka

=== Thailand ===
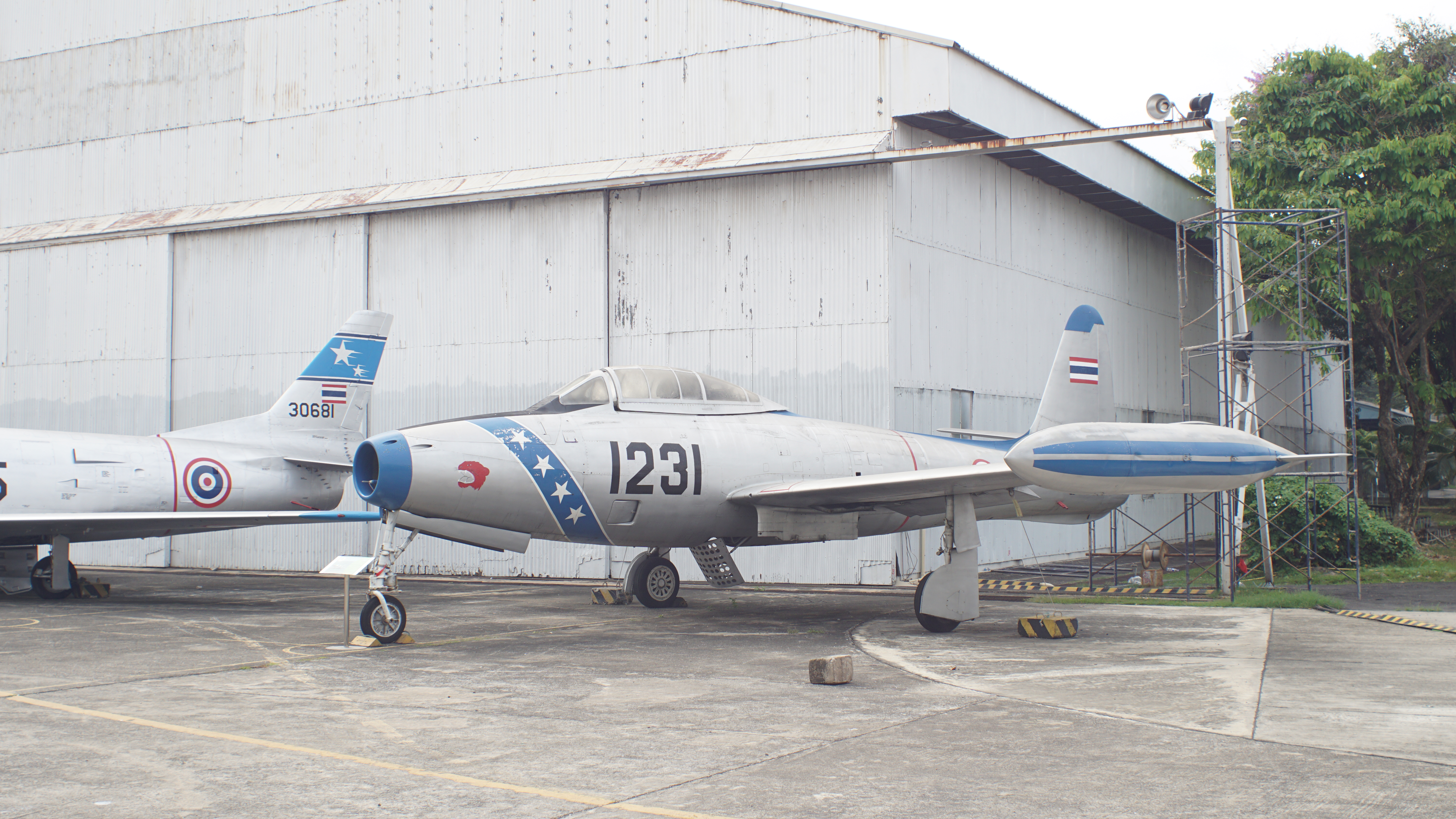
F-84G at the Royal Thai Air Force Museum

F-84G

- 51-10582 Ex-USAF and retired Royal Thai Air Force fighter in Royal Thai Air Force Museum.

=== Turkey ===
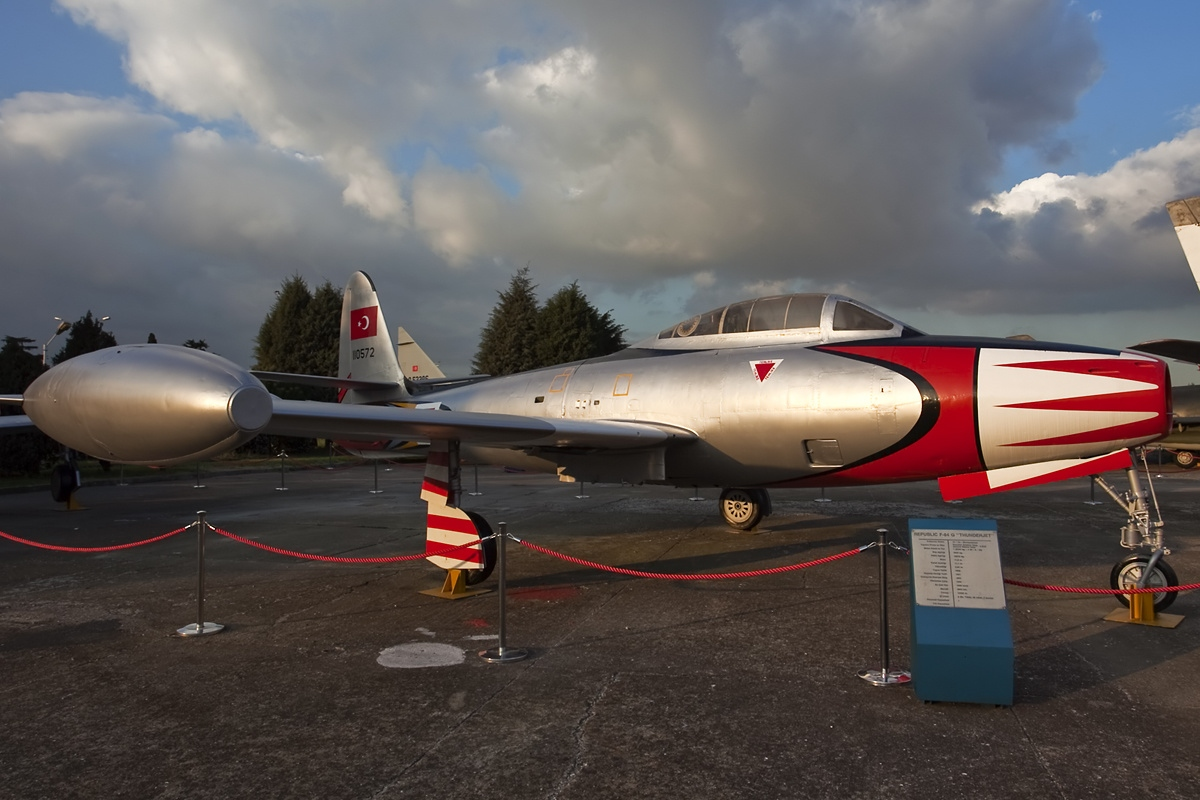
110572 F-84G at Atatürk Airport

F-84G

- 51-10572 – Displayed at Istanbul Aviation Museum, Istanbul Atatürk Airport.
- 19953 – Atatürk Airport, Istanbul.

=== Taiwan ===
F-84G

- 054 – hanging display at ROC air force academy Aviation Science Museum.

=== United States ===
YP-84A

- 45-59494 – Discovery Park of America, Union City, Tennessee; formerly at Octave Chanute Aerospace Museum at the former Chanute Air Force Base in Rantoul, Illinois

F-84B

- 45-59504 – Cradle of Aviation Museum in Garden City, New York
- 45-59556 – Planes of Fame Museum in Chino, California
- 46-0666 – Mid-Atlantic Air Museum in Reading, Pennsylvania

F-84C

- 47-1433 – Pima Air and Space Museum, adjacent to Davis-Monthan Air Force Base in Tucson, Arizona
- 47-1486 – Goldwater Air National Guard Base, Sky Harbor International Airport in Phoenix, Arizona.
- 47-1498 – EAA Airventure Museum in Oshkosh, Wisconsin.
- 47-1513 – Kansas Aviation Museum at McConnell Air Force Base in Wichita, Kansas
- 47-1530 – Cannon Air Force Base, New Mexico.
- 47-1562 – Pueblo Weisbrod Aircraft Museum in Pueblo, Colorado
- 47-1595 – March Field Air Museum at March Air Reserve Base (former March Air Force Base) in Riverside, California.

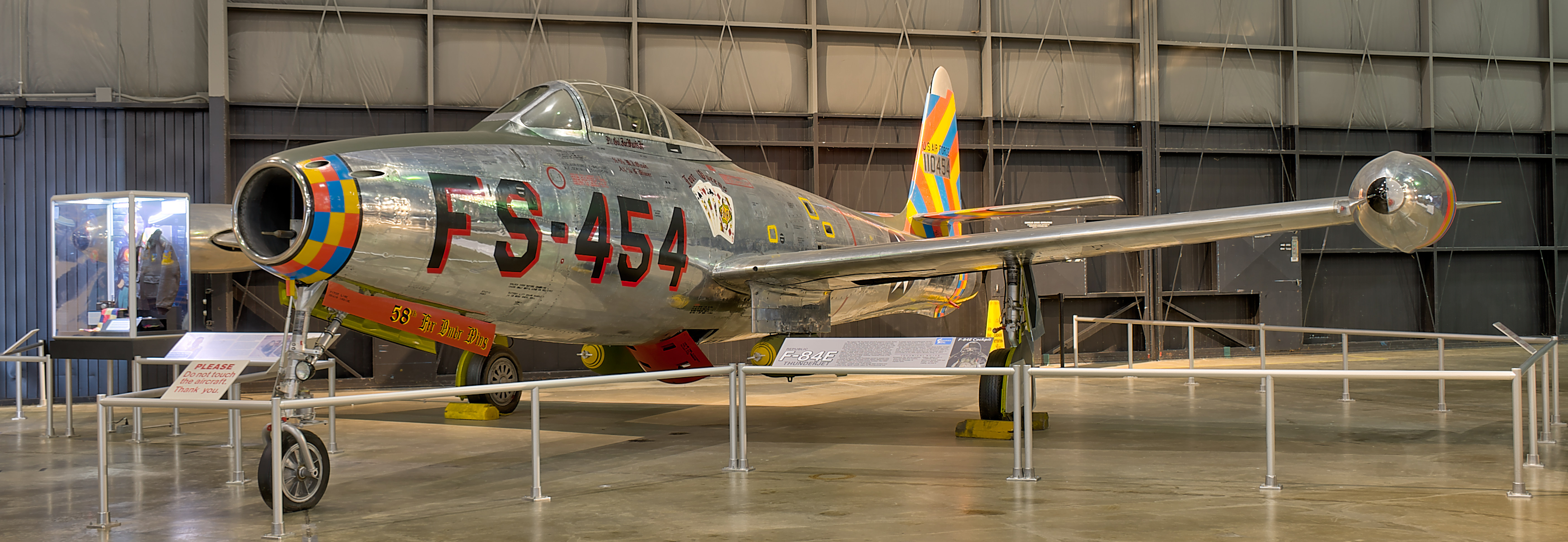
F-84E at the USAF Museum

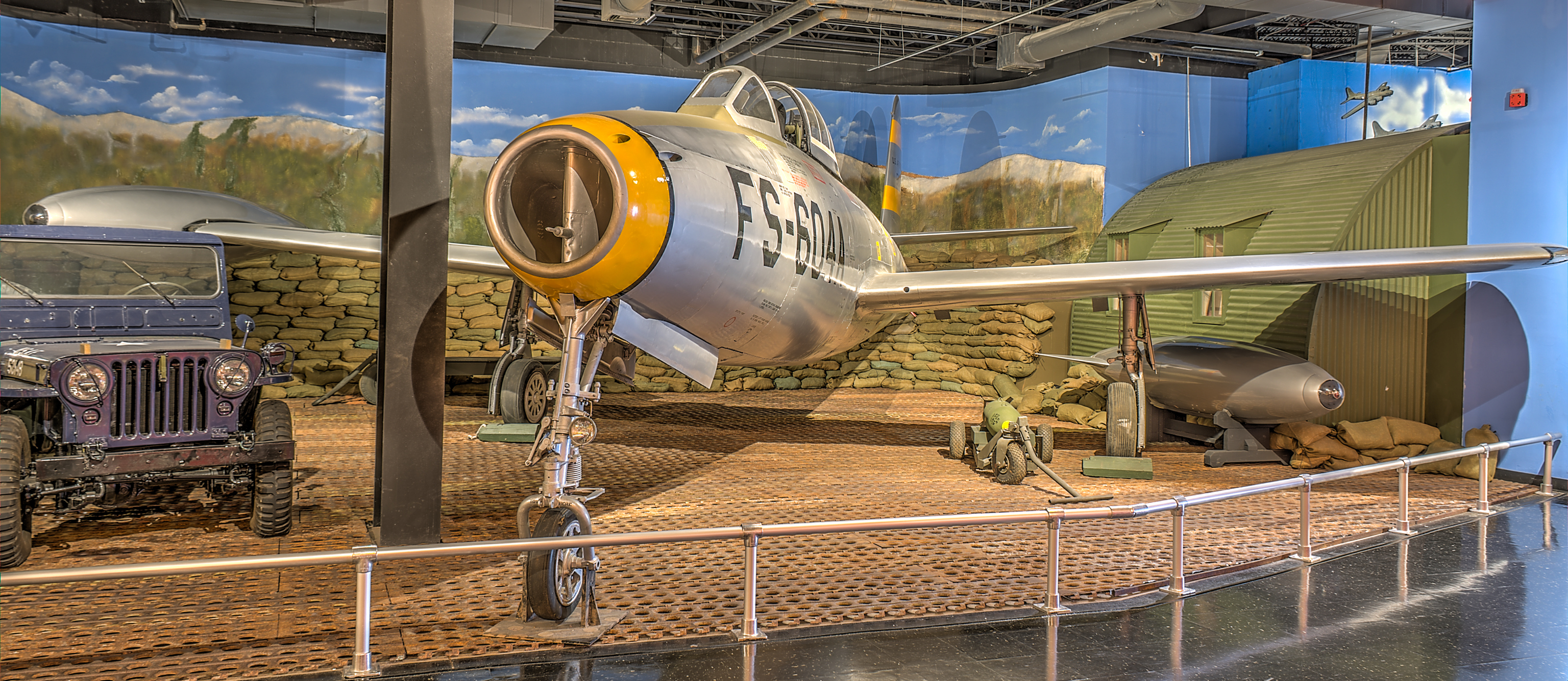
F-84E at the Museum of Aviation

F-84E

- 49-2155 – Yanks Air Museum in Chino, California.
- 49-2285 – Texas Military Forces Museum in Austin, Texas
- 49-2348 – American Airpower Museum in East Farmingdale, New York.
- 50-1143 – National Museum of the United States Air Force at Wright-Patterson Air Force Base in Dayton, Ohio. It was obtained from Robins Air Force Base, Georgia, in October 1963.
- 51-0604 – Museum of Aviation at Robins Air Force Base, Georgia

F-84F

- 51-1948 – Harlan Municipal Airport at Harlan, Iowa

F-84G

- N6599V – This aircraft was originally supplied to the Yugoslav Air Force, former number 51-11126. It is now disassembled, under restoration to airworthiness by a Vulcan Warbirds Inc. for the Flying Heritage Collection in Seattle, Washington.
- 51-0791 – Springfield Air National Guard Base, Springfield, Ohio.
- 52-2978 – Warhawk Air Museum at Nampa Municipal Airport, ex-Royal Norwegian Air Force.
- 52-3242 – Hill Aerospace Museum, Hill Air Force Base, Utah
