= 339th All-Weather Squadron =

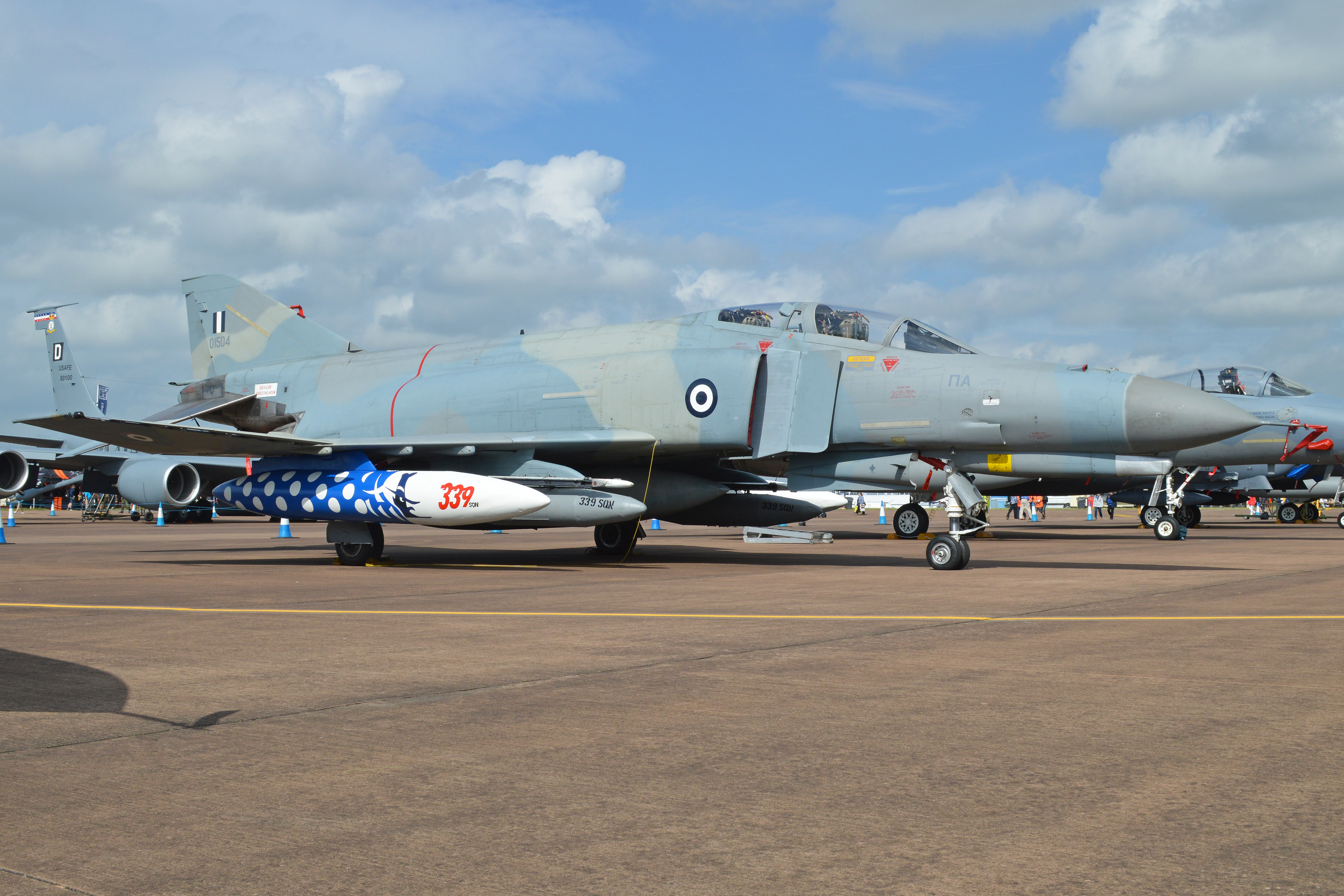
- An F-4E of the 339th Squadron with squadron art on the external fuel tanks
- Active: 1952–2017
- Branch: Hellenic Air Force
- Role: Interceptor, fighter-bomber
- Part of: 117th Combat Wing
- Garrison/HQ: Andravida Air Base

Aircraft flown
- Fighter: F-84G (1952–1959); F-84F (1959–1974); F-4E (1974–2017)

The 339th All-Weather Squadron (Greek: 339 Μοίρα Παντός Καιρού, 339 MΠΚ), callsign "Ajax" (ΑΙΑΣ), was a squadron in service with the Hellenic Air Force from 1952 to 2017.

== History ==
The squadron was established on 7 July 1952 as the 339 Fighter-Bomber Squadron (339 Μοίρα Δίωξης/Βομβαρδισμού), at the Elefsis Air Base, equipped with F-84G Thunderjets. In January 1953 it moved to the 110th Combat Wing at Larissa Air Base, where it remained until 1956, when it returned to Elefsis and the 112th Combat Wing. In August 1959, the squadron began delivery of F-84F Thunderstreaks, and moved again to 110th CW at Larissa until April 1960, when it moved to 111th Combat Wing at Nea Anchialos Air Base.

In 1971 it was moved to the Andravida Air Base where it remained almost continuously until its deactivation in 2017. The only exception was in 1973–1974, when work was being done in Andravida to prepare for the arrival of the new McDonnell Douglas F-4E, and the squadron relocated to nearby Araxos Air Base. The squadron returned to Andravida in March 1974, and began delivery of the first F-4Es the next month. The squadron undertook a dual mission, fighter-bomber and interception, but in 1978 the former was made its main role until 1983, when the priority was reversed. From 2002 to 2005, the squadron received upgraded F-4Es as part of the 'Peace Icarus 2000' project. The squadron was declared operational with the upgraded aircraft in December 2003, and returned to its interceptor mission, with fighter-bomber role as a secondary mission.

The squadron was decommissioned on 31 October 2017, as part of the gradual withdrawal of F-4E from service.
