= 341st Squadron (HAF) =

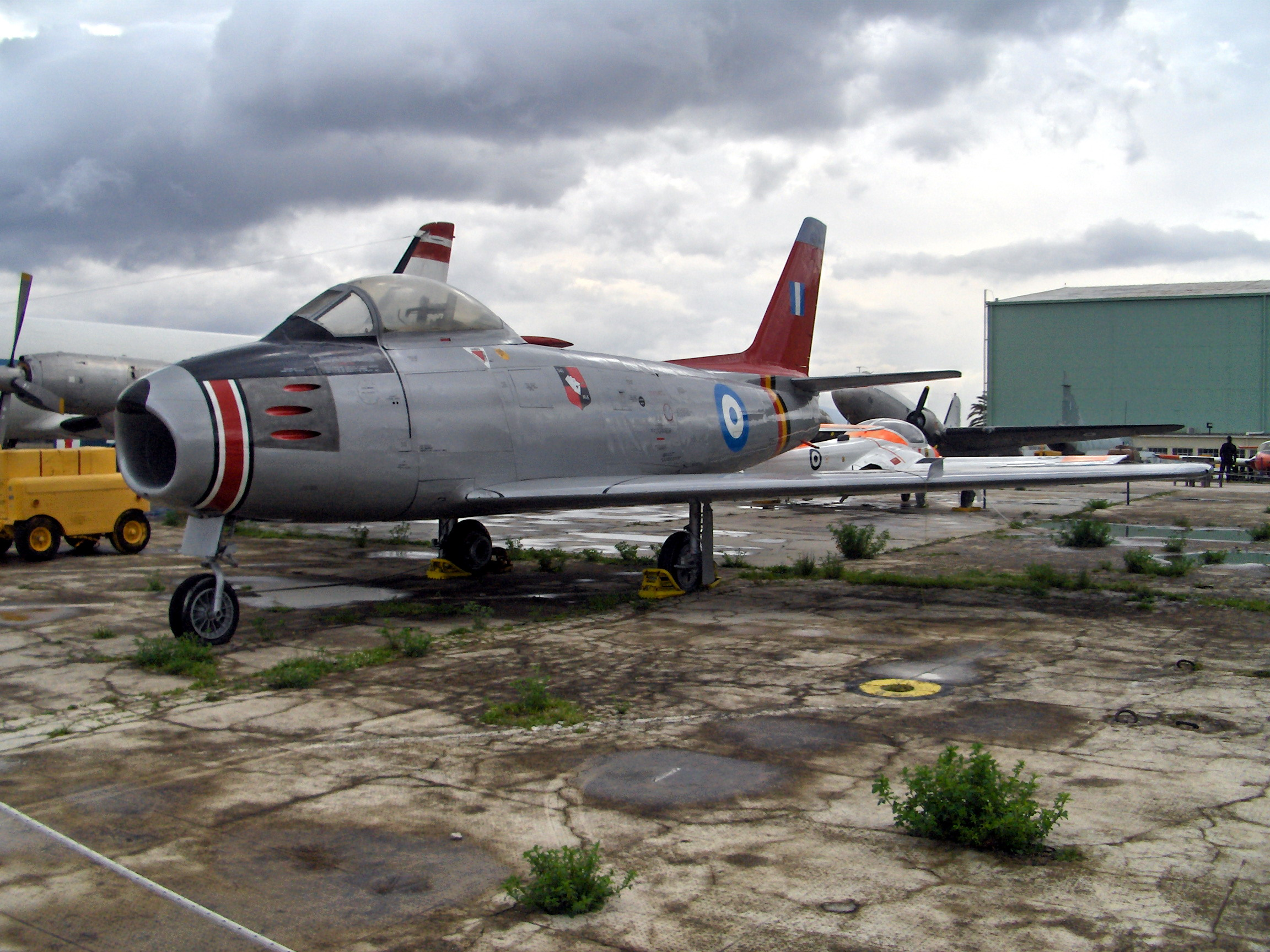
- F-86E in the livery of the 341st Day Interceptor Squadron, Hellenic Air Force Museum
- Active: 1954–1993, 1998–today
- Branch: Hellenic Air Force
- Role: All-weather interception, SEAD
- Part of: 111th Combat Wing
- Garrison/HQ: Nea Anchialos Air Base

Aircraft flown
- Fighter: F-86E (1954–1965); F-5A/B (1965–1993); F-16 Block 50 (1998–)

The 341st Squadron (Greek: 341 Μοίρα, 341 M), callsign "Arrow" (ΒΕΛΟΣ), is a squadron in service with the Hellenic Air Force, forming part of the 111th Combat Wing. It is based at Nea Anchialos Air Base, and operates the F-16 Block 50 aircraft. Alongside interception, the squadron specializes in SEAD tactics.

== History ==
The squadron was established in 1954 as the 341st Day Interceptor Squadron (341 Μοίρα Αναχαίτισης Ημέρας), at the Elefsis Air Base, equipped with F-86E Sabres. Its main mission was interception, with a secondary fighter-bomber role. In 1955 the squadron moved to the newly established Nea Anchialos Air Base, then to Tanagra Air Base (114th Combat Wing) in 1956, and returned to Nea Anchialos and the 111th Combat Wing in 1960. The squadron provided the core for the second and third aerobatic teams of the Greek air force, "Acro Team", and the second iteration of "Hellenic Flame".

The squadron began delivery of the F-5A/B light fighters in 1965, assuming a central role in daylight interception role over Greek airspace. As the F-5s started being withdrawn from service in the early 1990s, he squadron was disbanded in 1993.

The squadron was reformed in 1998 under its current designation, and equipped with F-16 Block 50 aircraft. The squadron is also the first HAF squadron to specialize in the SEAD role, taking delivery of the AGM-88 HARM missile at the same time.
