= Lists of military installations =

This list of military installations consists of a collection of military related lists worldwide:

== Africa ==
- List of South African military bases
  - List of bases of the South African Air Force

== Americas ==
- List of Brazilian military bases
- List of Canadian Forces Bases
- List of Honduran military bases
- List of Mexican military installations

=== United States ===
- List of United States Army installations
- List of United States Air Force installations
- List of United States Space Force installations
- List of United States Navy installations
- List of United States Marine Corps installations
- List of United States Coast Guard stations
- List of military bases in the District of Columbia
- List of NATO (including United States military) installations in Afghanistan
- Bulgarian–American Joint Military Facilities
- List of United States Army installations in Germany
- List of United States Army installations in Italy
- List of United States military installations in Iraq
- List of United States Army installations in Kosovo
- List of United States Army installations in Kuwait
- List of United States Army installations in South Korea
- List of former United States Army installations
- List of former United States military installations in Panama

== Asia ==
- List of Burmese military installations
- List of Chinese Air Force Bases
- List of Indian Air Force stations
- List of Israel Defense Forces bases
- List of Pakistan Air Force Bases
- Military installations of Turkey
- List of military installations in Saudi Arabia
- List of Singapore Armed Forces bases
- List of Sri Lankan air force bases

== Europe ==
- List of Bulgarian military bases
- List of Danish Military Installations
- List of Greek military bases
- List of Irish military installations

=== Multinational installations ===
- Papa Air Base, Hungary - Strategic Airlift Capability

=== United Kingdom ===
- List of British Army installations
- List of Royal Air Force stations
- List of Battle of Britain airfields
- List of V Bomber dispersal bases
- List of air stations of the Royal Navy
- List of Royal Navy shore establishments
- List of airfields of the Army Air Corps (United Kingdom)
- List of UK Thor missile bases
- British Forces Germany

== Oceania ==
- List of Australian military bases
  - List of Royal Australian Air Force installations
  - List of Royal Australian Navy bases
- List of New Zealand military bases

== Others ==
- List of countries with overseas military bases
- List of Soviet Air Force bases

=== NATO installations ===
See Category:Military installations of NATO

Headquarters

- SHAPE (Supreme Headquarters Allied Powers Europe) in Casteau, north of Mons (Belgium), since 1966 (before in Paris). SHAPE is since 2003 the headquarters of Allied Command Operations (ACO) controlling all allied operations worldwide.
- NATO Communications and Information Agency (NCI Agency) in The Hague, Mons (Belgium) and Brussels
- Headquarters Allied Command Transformation (based in Norfolk, Virginia. Other ACT organisations include the Joint Warfare Centre (JWC) located in Stavanger, Norway (in the same site as the former Norwegian NJHQ); the Joint Force Training Centre (JFTC) in Bydgoszcz, Poland; the Joint Analysis and Lessons Learned Centre (JALLC) in Monsanto, Portugal; and the NATO Undersea Research Centre (NURC), La Spezia, Italy.
- Parts of Allied Command Transformation (based in Norfolk, Virginia) in SHAPE's headquarters.
- the three Joint Force Commands - Allied Joint Force Command Brunssum in Brunnsum, Netherlands; Naples, and Norfolk;

Bases

- NATO Air Base Geilenkirchen, Germany - hosts NATO Airborne Early Warning Force (NAEWF) Boeing E-3 Sentry aircraft.
- Chièvres Air Base, Belgium - operated by U.S. Army and U.S. Air Force but "considered an installation of SHAPE."
