= 348 Squadron =

348 Squadron may refer to:

- 348th Tactical Reconnaissance Squadron, Hellenic Air Force
- 348th Night Fighter Squadron, United States Air Force
- 348th Reconnaissance Squadron, United States Air Force
- 348th Tactical Airlift Squadron, United States Air Force
