= Fighter Weapons School =

Fighter Weapons School can mean the following:

- Fighter Weapons School RAF, part of the Royal Air Force
- Fighter Weapons School, part of the Hellenic Air Force Tactical Command
- Tactics and Air Combat Development Establishment, Indian Air Force
- United States Navy Fighter Weapons School, now the United States Navy Strike Fighter Tactics Instructor program
- United States Air Force Fighter Weapons School now the USAF Weapons School
