= 337th Squadron (HAF) =

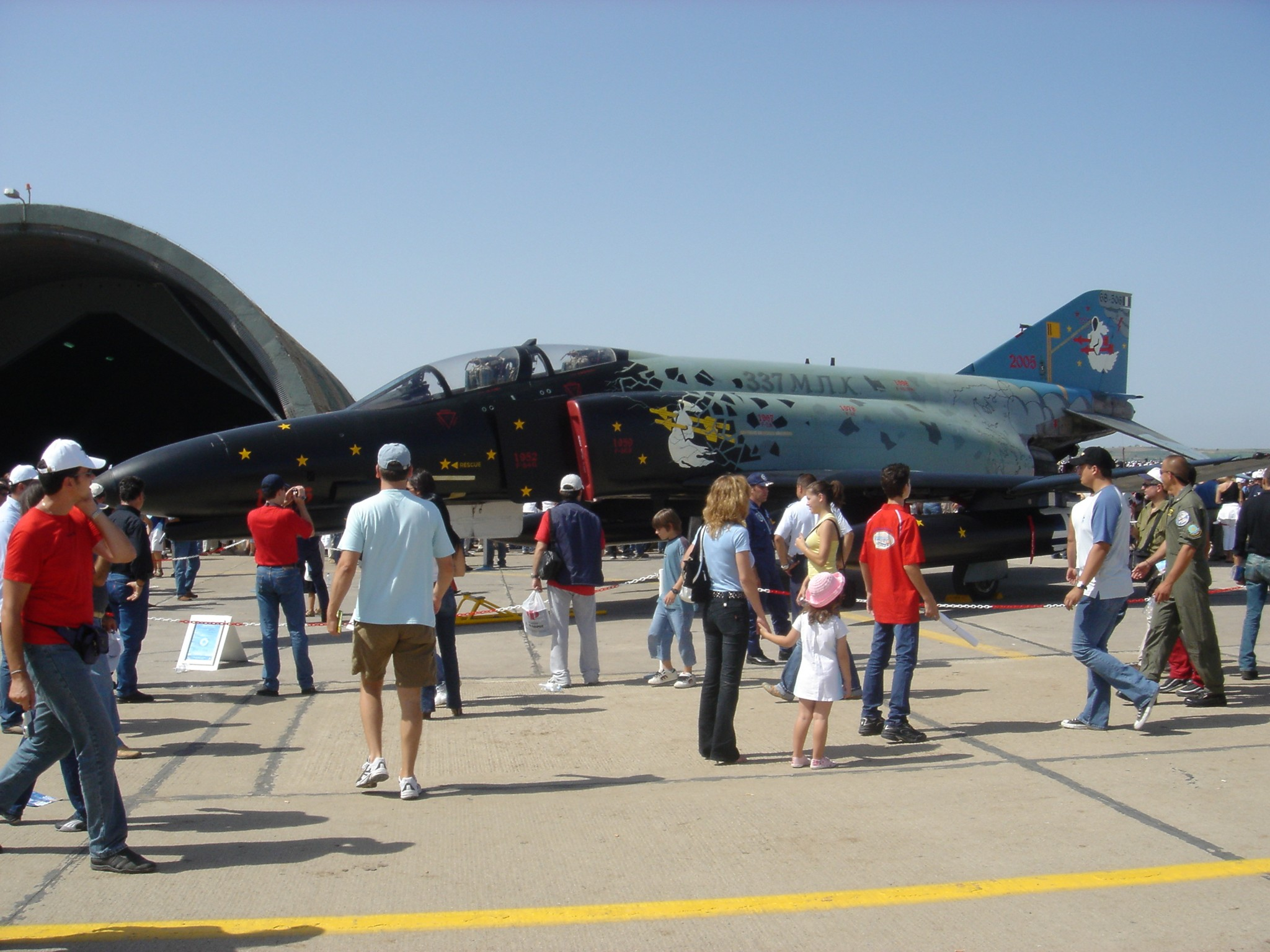
- F-4E in special livery of 337th All-Weather Squadron, Archangel 2005 airshow
- Active: 1948–2005, 2006–current
- Branch: Hellenic Air Force
- Part of: 110th Combat Wing
- Garrison/HQ: Larissa Air Base
- Website: https://www.haf.gr/structure/ata/110pm/337m/ (Greek)

Aircraft flown
- Fighter: Spitfire (1948–1952); F-84G and T-33 (1952–1959); F-86D (1959–1967); F-5A/B (1967–1978); F-4E (1978–2005); F-16C/D Block 52+ (2006–)

The 337th Squadron (Greek: 337 Μοίρα, 337 M), callsign "Ghost", is the third oldest squadron in service with the Hellenic Air Force, forming part of the 110th Combat Wing. It is based at Larissa Air Base, and operates the F-16 Block 52+ aircraft.

== History ==
The 337th Squadron traces its origins to the Greek air force in exile during World War II, starting as a Spitfire-equipped flight in No. 339 Wing RAF. In 1946 it moved to Elefsis Air Base, and was raised to full squadron in 1948.

in 1952, the 337th became the first squadron of the Greek air force to be equipped with jet aircraft, its Spitfires being slowly replaced with Republic F-84 Thunderjets and Lockheed T-33s. The squadron was relocated to Larissa Air Base and redesignated 337th Fighter-Bomber Squadron (337 Μοίρα Διώξεως-Βομβαρδισμού). During this time, the squadron formed the first Greek aerobatic team, the Hellenic Flame.

The squadron returned to Elefsis in 1956, before moving to Tanagra Air Base in 1959 to start its equipment with the North American F-86D Sabre. Redesignated 337th All-Weather Squadron (337 Μοίρα Παντός Καιρού), it was based at Larissa from 1960 to 1967.

In 1967 the squadron was re-equipped with Northrop F-5s, moving to Nea Anchialos Air Base as the 337th Day Interceptor Squadron (337 Μοίρα Αναχαίτησης Ημέρας). The squadron returned to Larissa in 1978 and was re-equipped with McDonnell Douglas F-4E aircraft, assuming the title 337th All-Weather Interceptor Squadron (337 Μοίρα Αναχαίτησης Παντός Καιρού).

The squadron was temporarily decommissioned in 2005, in preparation for its transition to the F-16 Block 52+ aircraft. It resumed operation in 2006, under its current designation.
