= 348th Tactical Reconnaissance Squadron =

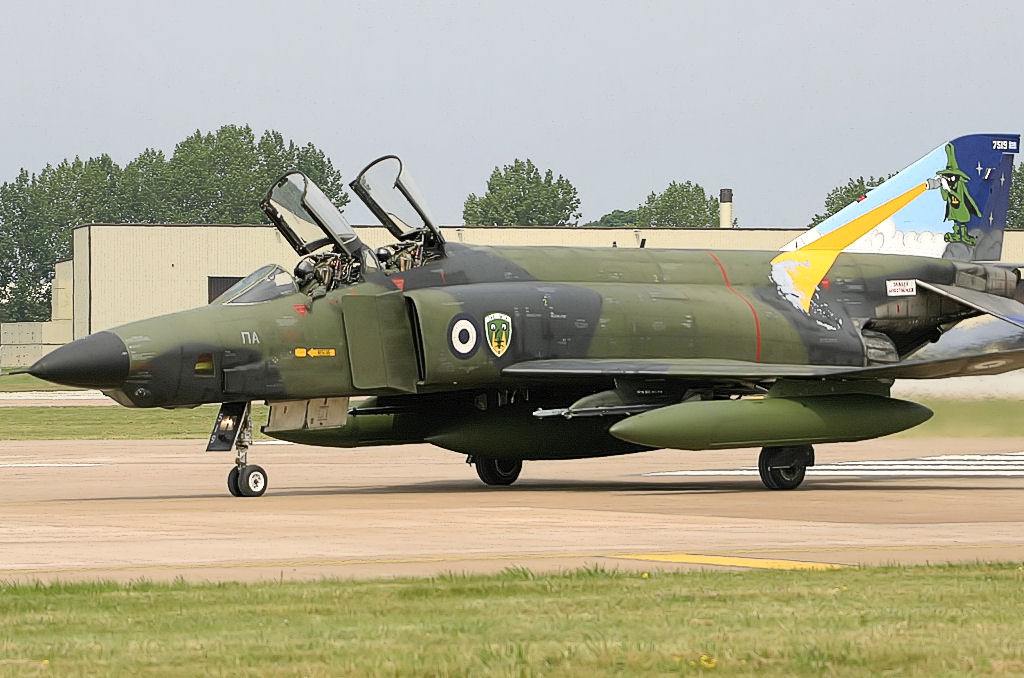
- Ex-German RF-4E with 348 Squadron tail art at the Royal International Air Tattoo 2005
- Active: 1955–2017
- Branch: Hellenic Air Force
- Part of: 110th Combat Wing
- Garrison/HQ: Larissa Air Base

Aircraft flown
- Fighter: F-84G (1955); RT-33A (1955–1957); RF-84F (1956–1991); RF-4E (1978–2017)

The 348th Tactical Reconnaissance Squadron (Greek: 348 Μοίρα Τακτικής Αναγνώρισης, 348 MΤΑ), callsign "Eyes" (ΜΑΤΙΑ), was a specialized photo reconnaissance squadron in service with the Hellenic Air Force, forming part of the 110th Combat Wing.

== History ==
The squadron traces its origins to a photo reconnaissance flight established at Elefsis Air Base on 26 November 1953, equipped with F-84G. The flight moved to the squadron's eventual home base at Larissa Air Base on 5 July.

The flight was expanded to a full squadron in May 1955, and the F-84Gs began being replaced with specialized RT-33A reconnaissance aircraft. They. remained in service until 1957, being replaced from August 1956 on by the more capable RF-84F.

The next major technological leap came in November 1978, with the arrival of the first of eight RF-4E aircraft. The squadron would operate a mix of RF-84F and RF-4E until 1991, when the former were withdrawn from service. They were replaced by 27 RF-4Es received from the German Air Force in 1993–1994. Twenty of these were taken into service, and the rest used for spare parts.

The squadron was disbanded on 5 May 2017, and the last RF-4E aircraft withdrawn from service.
