= 338 Squadron =

338 Squadron may refer to:

- 338th Fighter-Bomber Squadron, Greece
- 338th Combat Crew Training Squadron, United States
- 338th Combat Training Squadron, United States
