= SPJ (disambiguation) =

SPJ is the US Society of Professional Journalists

SPJ may also refer to:

== Transportation ==
- Air Service (airline) (former ICAO code SPJ); See List of airline codes (A)
- Samastipur Junction railway station (station code SPJ), India
- Sparti Air Base (IATA code SPJ), Greece

== Other uses ==
- Simon Peyton Jones, British computer scientist
- Self-protective jamming, or SPJ, in radar jamming and deception
- Special Program in Journalism, or SPJ, in Philippine secondary schools; See Technology and Livelihood Education
- Sunrise Party of Japan, or SPJ, a former political party
