= 343rd Squadron (HAF) =

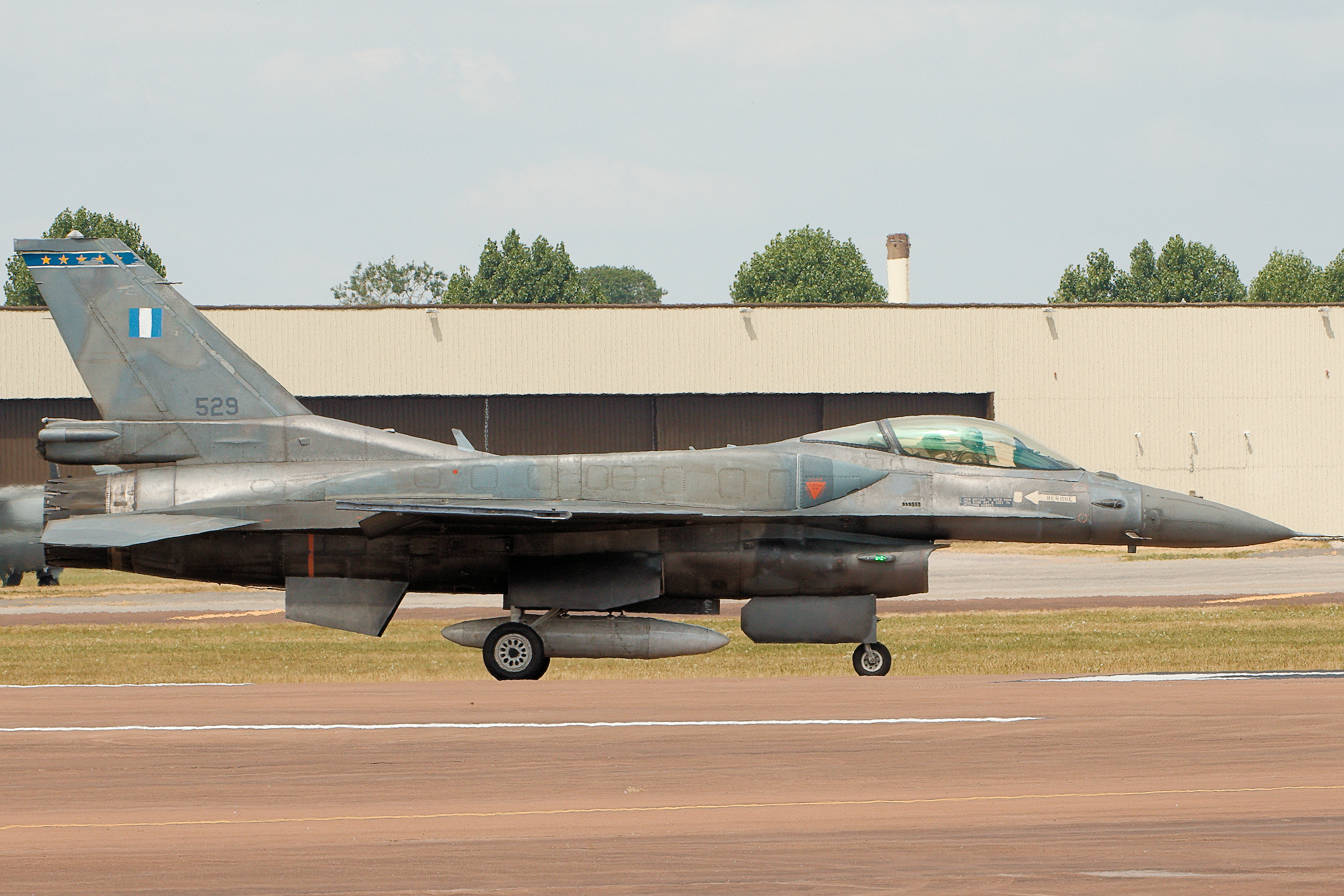
- F-16 of 343rd Squadron at the Royal International Air Tattoo 2018
- Active: 1955–2001, 2003–today
- Branch: Hellenic Air Force
- Part of: 115th Combat Wing
- Garrison/HQ: Souda Air Base

Aircraft flown
- Fighter: F-86E (1955–1961); F-86D and T-33 (1961–1966); F-5A/B (1966–2001); F-16 Block 52+ (2003–)

The 343rd Squadron (Greek: 343 Μοίρα, 343 M), callsign "Star" (ΑΣΤΕΡΙ), is a squadron in service with the Hellenic Air Force, forming part of the 115th Combat Wing. It is based at Souda Air Base, and operates the F-16 Block 52+ aircraft.

== History ==
The squadron was established in September 1955 as the 343rd Day Interceptor Squadron (343 Μοίρα Αναχαίτισης Ημέρας), at the Elefsis Air Base, equipped with F-86E Sabres. In November 1955 the squadron moved to Tanagra Air Base (114th Combat Wing) until May 1958, when it moved to Nea Anchialos Air Base (111th Combat Wing).

In 1961, the squadron replaced its F-86Es with F-86D and T-33, and was renamed as 343rd All-Weather Squadron (343 Μοίρα Παντός Καιρού).

The squadron began delivery of the F-5A/B light fighters in 1966, assuming a central role in daylight interception role over Greek airspace, with a secondary fighter-bomber role, and reverting to its previous designation as a Day Interceptor Squadron. The squadron moved to the 113th Combat Wing at Mikra Air Base in July 1974, until June 1985, when it returned to Nea Anchialos and 111th CW. It was disbanded in March 2001.

The squadron was reformed in 2003 under its current designation, as part of 115th Combat Wing at Souda Air base, and equipped with F-16 Block 52+ aircraft.
