= List of Burmese military installations =

This is a list of military installations in Myanmar operated by the Myanmar Armed Forces.

== Joint ==
- Fort Ba Htoo
- Fort Bayinnaung
- Fort Ye Mon

== Air Force ==
Name	Coordinates
Hmawbi Air Base	17.122343, 96.065658
Kyaukhtu Air Base	21.387752, 94.123973
Lashio Air Base	22.978599, 97.752373
Magway Air Base	20.165753, 94.967275
Meiktila Air Base	20.886400, 95.892792
Mingaladon Air Base	16.906459, 96.135501
Monywa Air Base	22.220920, 95.094510
Myeik Air Base	12.443439, 98.621428
Nampong Air Force Base	25.351388, 97.300444
Namsang Air Base	20.890517, 97.734969
Naypyidaw Air Base	19.616483, 96.211881
Pathein Air Base	16.812113, 94.774674
Shante Air Base	20.931788, 95.917538
Tada-U Air Base	21.683678, 95.983436
Taungoo Air Base	19.032054, 96.397516

== Academic ==
- Defence Services Academy (DSA)
- Defence Services Medical Academy (DSMA)
- Defence Services Technological Academy (DSTA)
- Defence Services Institute of Nursing and Paramedical Science

Training Schools

- Officers Training School, Bahtoo (OTS)
- Basic Army Combat Training School, Bahtoo
- 1st Army Combat Forces School, Bahtoo
- 2nd Army Combat Forces School, Bayinnaung
- Special Forces School, Ye Mon
- Artillery Training School, Mone Tai
- Armour Training School, Maing Maw
- Electronic Warfare School, Pyin U Lwin
- Engineer School, Pyin U Lwin
- Information Warfare School, Yangon
- Air, Land and Paratroops Training School, Hmawbi

== Navy ==
- Irrawaddy Regional Command (headquarters in Yangon)
  - Thanhklyet Soon Naval Base
  - Thanlyin Naval Base
  - Thanlyin Naval Base
  - Thilawa Naval Base
  - Coco Island Base (including Naval Radar Unit)
- Danyawaddy Regional Command (headquarters in Sittwe)
  - Kyaukpyu Naval Base
  - Thandwe (Sandoway) Naval Base
  - No. 71 Submarine Base (on Ownchein Island near Kyaukphyu SEZ)
- Panmawaddy Regional Command (headquarters on Haigyi Island)
- Mawyawaddy Regional Command (headquarters in Mawlamyine)
- Tanintharyi Regional Command (headquarters in Myeik)
  - Zadetkyi Island Naval Base
  - Mali (Tavoy) Naval Base
  - Palai Island Naval Base
  - Kadan Naval Base
  - Sakanthit Naval Base
  - Lambi Naval Base
  - Pearl Island Naval Base
  - Zadetkale Naval Base

== See also ==
- Lists of military installations
- Tatmadaw
