= Triodos =

Triodos might refer to:

- Triodos, Messenia, a village in the municipality of Messini, Messenia, southern Greece
  - Triodos Airport, near the village
- Triodos Bank which is a pioneer in ethical banking
