= Sparta Air Base =

Sparta Airport Αεροδρόμιο Σπάρτης
- IATA: SPJ; ICAO: LGSP

Summary
- Airport type: Military
- Location: Sparta, Greece
- Elevation AMSL: 152 m (499 ft)
- Coordinates: 36°58′26″N 022°31′34″E

Map
- Location of airport in Greece

Runways
Direction	Length		Surface
Direction	m	ft	Surface
06/24	916	3,005	Asphalt

Sparta Airport (Greek: Αεροδρόμιο Σπάρτης) (IATA: SPJ, ICAO: LGSP) is a military airport located 17 km (9 NM) south of Sparta (Greek: Σπάρτη), a municipality in the regional unit of Laconia in Greece.

== Facilities ==
The airport resides at an elevation of 152 metres (499 ft) above mean sea level. It has one runway designated 06/24 with an asphalt surface measuring 916 by 23 metres (3,005 ft × 75 ft).

== Nearest airports ==
The three nearest airports are:

- Kalamata Airport – 45 km (24 NM) west-northwest
- Triodhon Airport – 49 km (26 NM) west-northwest
- Tripolis Airport – 62 km (33 NM) north
