= International Flight Training Center, Kalamata =

Greek flight training facility

International Flight Training Center
- Διεθνές Εκπαιδευτικό Κέντρο Πτήσεων; Διεθνές Κέντρο Εκπαίδευσης Πιλότων
- Part of Kalamata Air Base
- Kalamata, Greece

Site information
- Type: Military flight training center
- Code: IFTC
- Owner: Hellenic Air Force
- Operator: Hellenic Air Force (in partnership with Elbit Systems)
- Controlled by: Greece

Location
- Coordinates: 37.0683°N 22.0254°E
- Area: Ground-Based Training Center (2,000 m²); Logistics Center (1,300 m²)

Site history
- Built: 2021
- In use: May 2023–present

Garrison information
- Garrison: 120th Air Training Wing

The International Flight Training Center (IFTC; Greek: Διεθνές Εκπαιδευτικό Κέντρο Πτήσεων) is a military flight training facility located at the 120 Air Training Wing, in Kalamata Air Base, Greece. It was established to provide training for pilots of the Hellenic Air Force (HAF) and trainees from allied nations. The center is operated as a collaboration between HAF and Elbit Systems, an Israeli defense contractor.

== History ==
Establishing a flight training center has been an aim of Greece since the early 2000s, but it never came to fruition before 2021. The International Flight Training Center was established in 2021 as part of a €1.375 billion agreement between the Greek and Israeli MOD. The deal, which was approved by Greece in January 2021 after considering offers from the Canadian firm CAE and the Israeli Elbit, includes a 22-year public-private partnership with Elbit Systems to modernize Greece's pilot training capabilities.

The provision of 10 M-346 Block 5+ advanced training aircraft (replacing the older T-2Es), upgrades to 25 T-6 Texan II of the HAF's fleet, and the installation of simulators and other training systems are also included in the contract.

Located within the Kalamata Air Base, a military installation operated by the Hellenic Air Force, the IFTC leverages the base's infrastructure, including runways and support facilities. While the base remains under Hellenic Air Force jurisdiction, Elbit Systems manages the center's modernization, operations, and training services.

The center became operational in 2023, and the first M-346 Block 5+ aircraft were delivered in May of that year.

== Facilities and training ==
The facilities of the IFTC include a 2,000 m^{2} ground-based training center and a 1,300 m^{2} logistics center, established at the air base to provide ongoing technical support. The center is equipped with systems for fleet control and communication and 5th generation flight simulators. Training programs cover basic (using the T-6 Texan II) and advanced (using the M-346) flight training for both Greek and international pilots. According to reporting by the Associated Press in late 2022, the T-6 will provide 7,000 and the M-346 will provide 3,500 flight training hours annually.

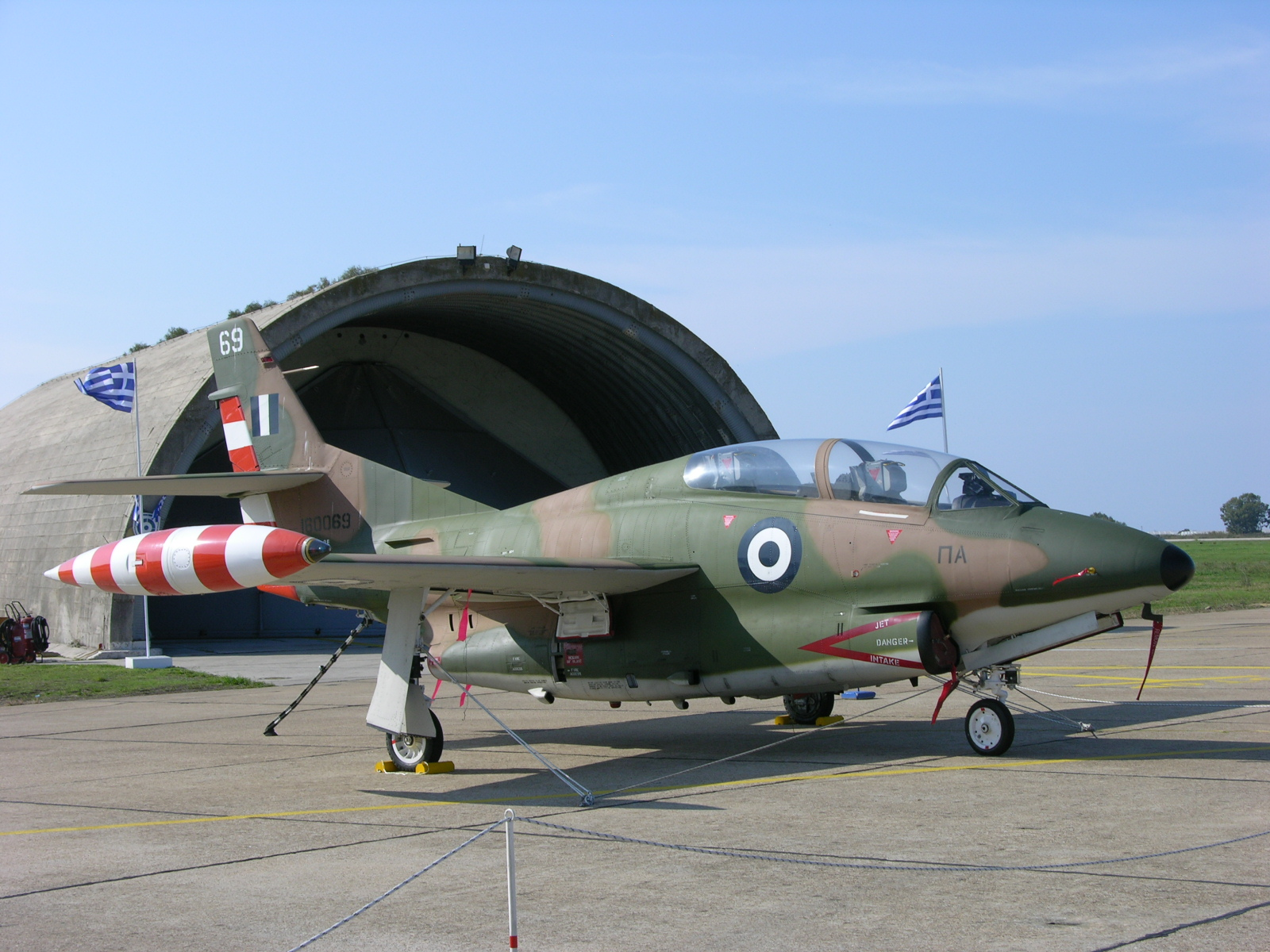
Older T-2E aircraft of the 120th ATW, which are set to be replaced by M-346s.

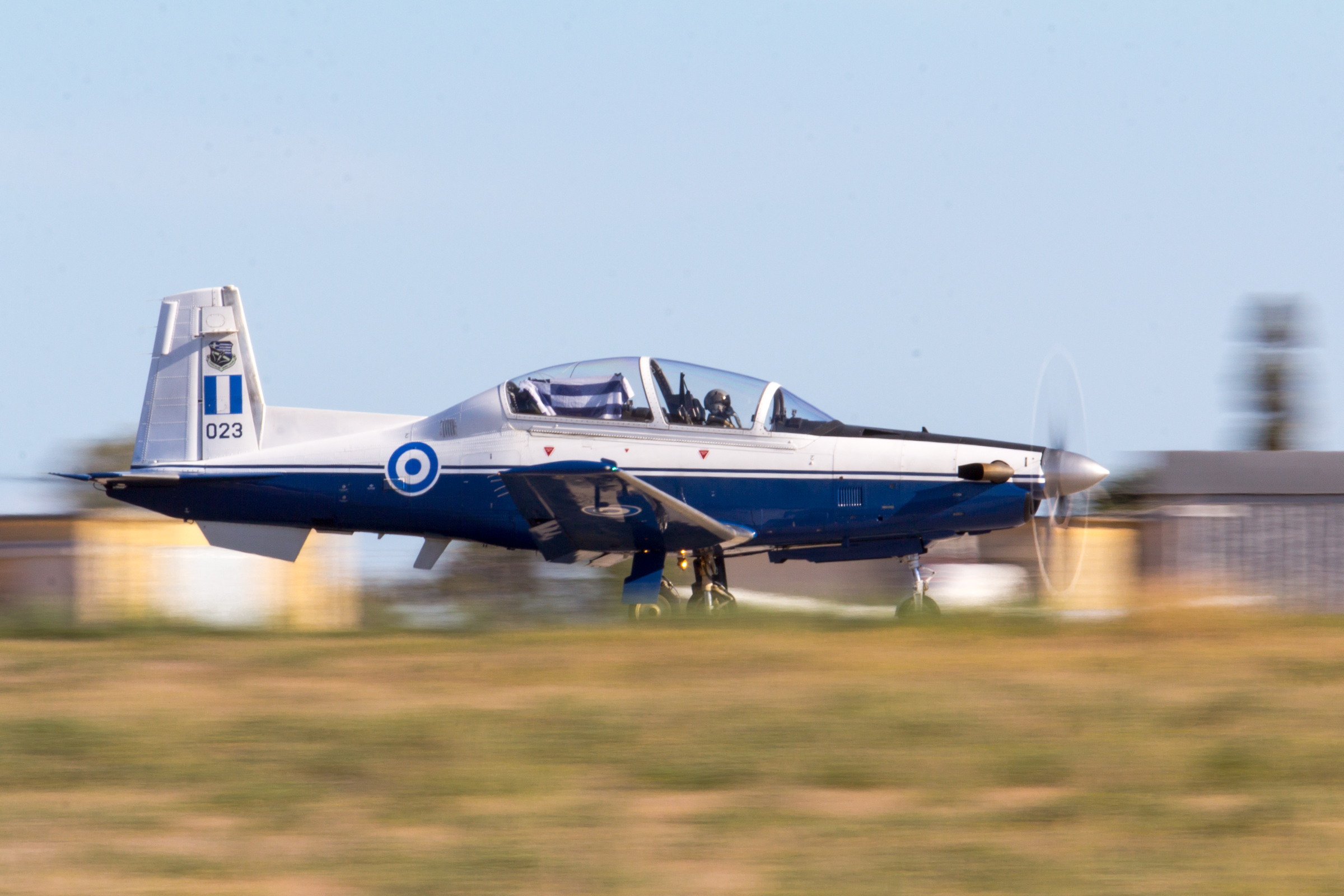
T-6 Texan II of HAF

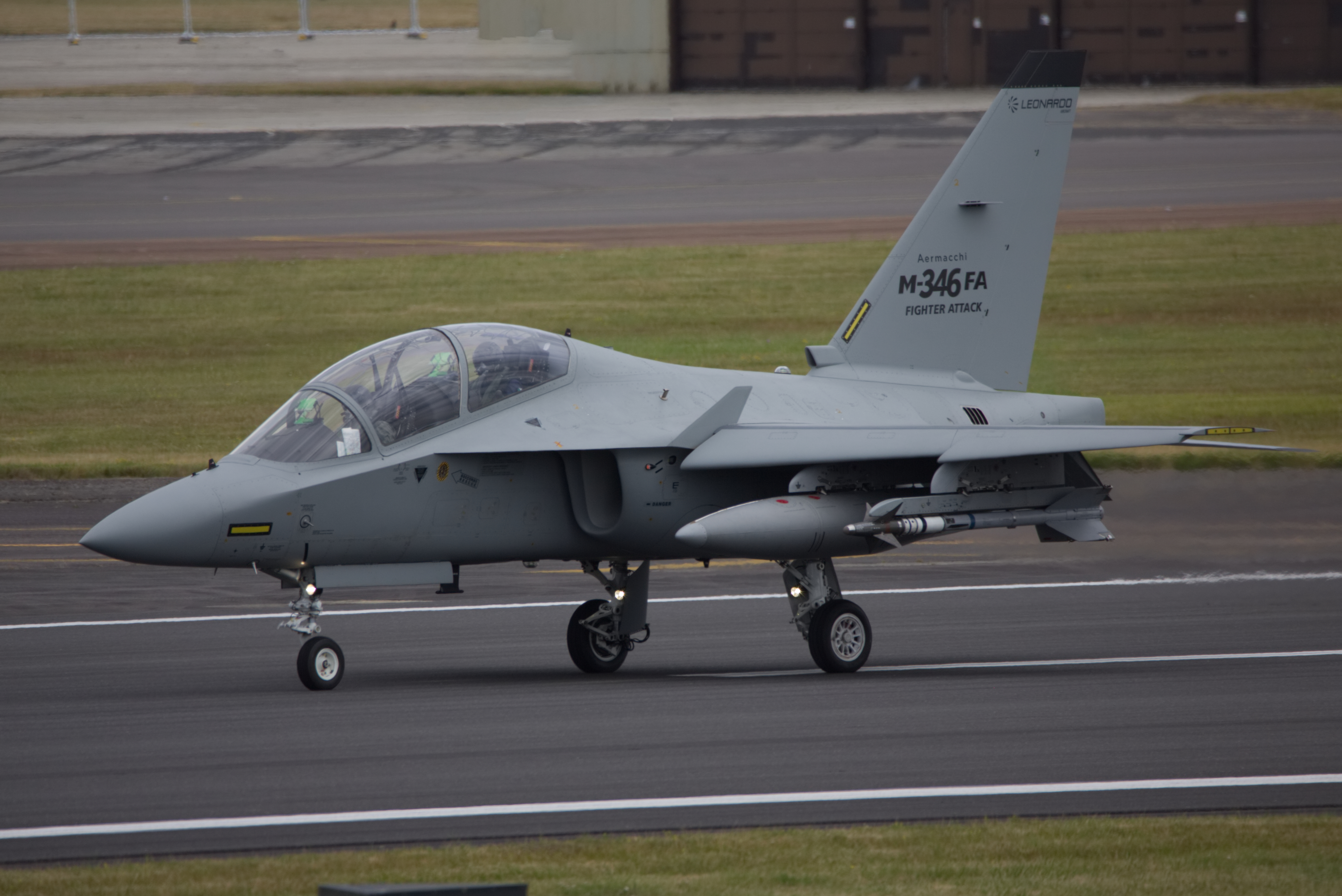
An M-346

The International Flight Training Center also serves as a hub for allied forces, with pilots from the Air Forces of Germany and Croatia to join training programs. The former has initiated a two-year training program at the IFTC, planning to enroll 16 pilots annually starting in 2025, while the latter is in discussions to begin pilot training at the center, also by 2025. The facility emphasizes interoperability with NATO and allied air forces.

== Strategic role ==
The IFTC plays a significant role in Greece's military modernization initiatives and regional defense strategy. It provides advanced pilot training for modern aircraft, including the Rafale, F-16 Viper, and future F-35 military aircraft.

Although the IFTC is not designated as a separate NFTE training campus, the center operates within the framework of the 120th Air Training Wing, which in 2023 became part of the NATO Flight Training Europe (NFTE) initiative. This program expanded to include training facilities in Greece, Hungary, and North Macedonia, aiming to enhance the capabilities of Allied military pilots and reached full operational capability in 2024.

== Reception ==
The decision to select Elbit Systems over the Canadian company CAE for the establishment of the International Flight Training Center in Kalamata has sparked a range of reactions. Critics, including media outlets such as Press Project and EfSyn, alleged that no international tender was conducted despite announcements that one would take place. Additionally, there were claims that the cost of the deal increased from €1.3 billion to €1.8 billion, though these allegations have not been independently verified by other sources.

Diplomatic reactions to the decision included concerns from the ambassadors of Canada and the United States to Greece, who reportedly supported CAE's proposal over that of Elbit Systems. Canadian officials also visited Kalamata to promote CAE's bid, emphasizing their extensive experience in pilot training systems and presenting their proposal as a competitive alternative.

Supporters of the Elbit Systems deal highlighted its strategic advantages for Greece's defense modernization. According to To Vima, the agreement reflected a deepening of defense ties with Israel and provided Greece with access to advanced technologies and training capabilities. The Greek Ministry of National Defense also defended the decision, citing Elbit Systems' expertise and its ability to meet the project's requirements efficiently.

Concerns about delays in establishing the center were also raised. In 2020, reports suggested that procedural and logistical challenges could jeopardize the project, potentially causing Greece to miss out on this significant opportunity.

== See also ==
- Hellenic Air Force
- Elbit Systems
- Alenia Aermacchi M-346 Master
