= Triodos Airport =

Triodos Airport Αεροδρόμιο/Μοντελοδρόμιο Τριόδου
- IATA: none; ICAO: none

Summary
- Airport type: Public
- Location: Triodos, Messenia, Greece
- Elevation AMSL: 11 m (36 ft)
- Coordinates: 37°05′40″N 021°59′25″E

Map
- Location of airport in Greece

Runways
Direction	Length		Surface
Direction	m	ft	Surface
16/34	1,200	3,937	Asphalt

Statistics (1961)
- Aircraft movements: 454
- Passengers: 4,185

Triodos Airport (Greek: Αεροδρόμιο Τριόδου), also known as Triodhon Airport, is an airport in the regional unit of Messenia in Greece. It is located 7 km (4 NM) from the town of Messini and 17 km (9 NM) from the city Kalamata.

Triodos Airport was used for 20 years for civil aviation. Due to the need for a longer runway, on 19 July 1970 flying operations were transferred to the Kalamata International Airport. Today, it is used for ultralight aviation and radio-controlled aircraft.

== Facilities ==
The airport has an elevation of 11 metres (36 ft) above mean sea level. It has one runway designated 16/34 with an asphalt surface measuring 1,200 by 40 metres (3,937 ft × 131 ft).

== Nearest airports ==
The three nearest airports are:

- Kalamata Airport – 4 km (2 NM) southeast
- Sparti Airport – 49 km (26 NM) east-southeast
- Tripolis Airport – 60 km (32 NM) northeast
