= Ye Mon =

Ye Mon Station(ရဲမွန်တပ်မြို့) is a military town located in Hmawbi Township, Yangon Region, Myanmar. It houses at least 12 armed units including 3 training schools.

== Order of battle ==
- (1) Special Forces Training School
- (2) Military Sport and Seft-defence Institute
- (3) 1 Warrant Officer and Non-Commissioned Officer Training School
- (4) 7 Infantry Regiments under the command of No.(11) Light Infantry Division (HQ in Inndine, Hlegu)
- (5) 1 Field Engineer Company
- (6) 1 Field Medical Company including 1 Field Hospital Unit(80 Bedded)
