= List of military bases in the District of Columbia =

Washington, DC, also known as the District of Columbia, is a small land mass home to the capital of the United States. Despite its small size, it home to six military bases. The largest of these bases is Bolling Air Force Base located in the far south east section of DC. Due to its close presence to the capital, it hosts more ceremonial units than any other state/district.

== United States Marine Corps ==
Base	Unit(s)
Marine Barracks Washington	Ceremonial Companies A,,B,C; Headquarters and Service Company.

== United States Navy ==
Base	Unit(s)
Navy Yard	US Navy Band, NAVSEA, Naval Reactors, National Museum of the United States Navy, Navy Installations Command, and the Marine Corps Institute.
Naval Support Facility Anacostia (Part of Joint Base Anacostia Bolling)	US Navy Ceremonial Guard, Marine Helicopter Squadron (HMX-1 Detachment), White House Communications Agency, Marine Forces Reserve Center, and Department of Defense Inspector General.
United States Naval Research Lab	Office of Naval Research

== United States Air Force ==
Base	Unit(s)
Bolling Air Force Base (Part of Joint Base Anacostia-Bolling)	United States Air Force Band, United States Air Force Honor Guard, Defense Intelligence Agency, 794th Communications Squadron, and 13th Force Support Squadron.

== United States Army ==
Base	Unit(s)
Fort Lesley J. McNair (Part of Joint Base Myer-Henderson Hall)	National Defense University, Inter American Defense College, United States Army Center of Military History.
