= Elefsina Air Base =

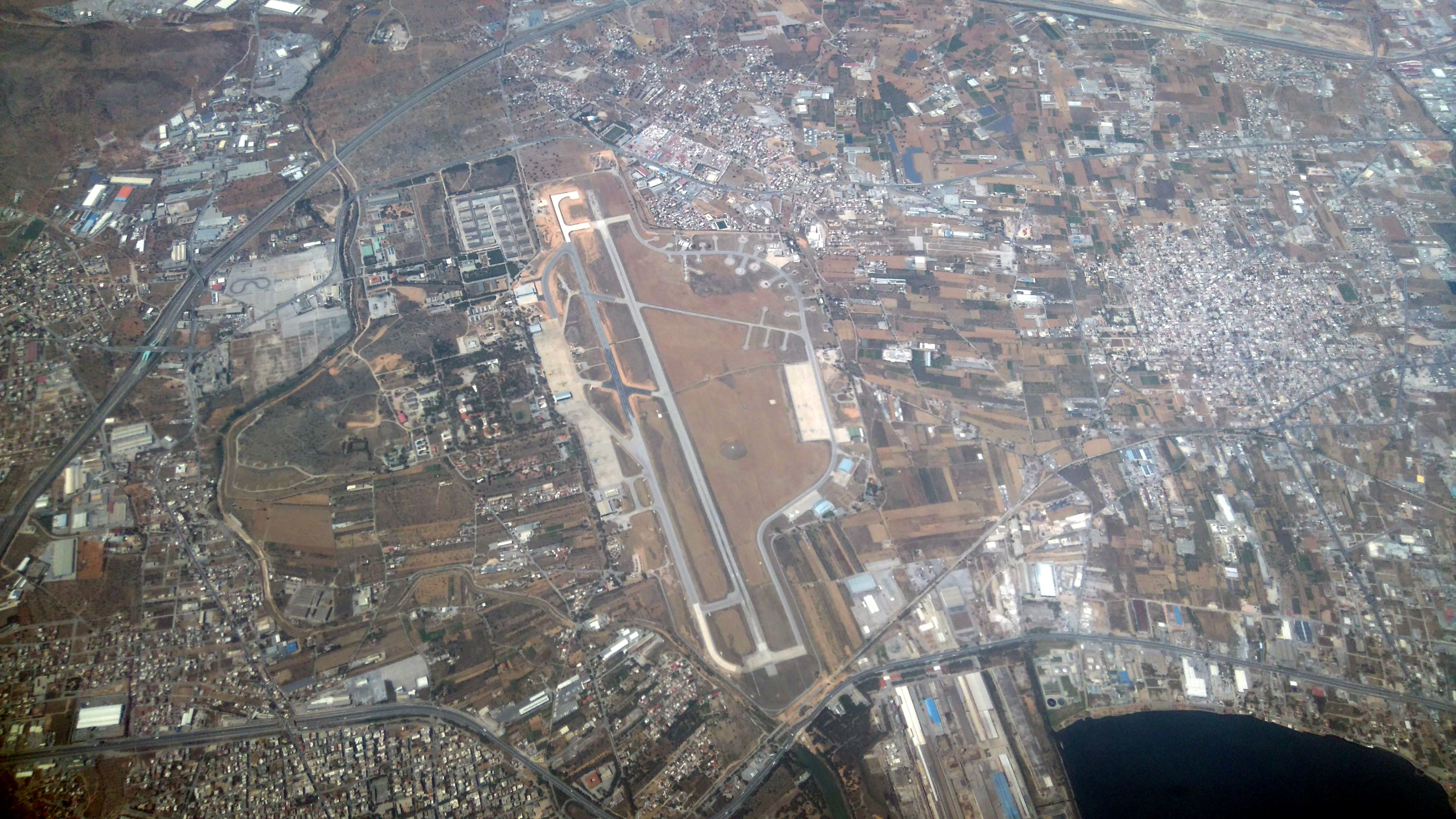
- Aerial view
- IATA: none; ICAO: LGEL

Summary
- Airport type: Military
- Owner: Hellenic Air Force
- Operator: 112th Combat Wing
- Serves: Athens
- Location: Elefsina, Greece
- Elevation AMSL: 134 ft (41 m)
- Coordinates: 38°4′5″N 23°33′14″E

Map
- Location in Greece

Runways
Direction	Length		Surface
Direction	ft	m	Surface
18/36	8,985	2,739	Asphalt

Elefsina Air Base (ICAO: LGEL) (Greek: Αεροπορική Βάση Ελευσίνας) is a military air base situated in Elefsina, Greece. It is used as the home-base of the 112th Combat Wing (112 Πτέρυγα Μάχης, 112 ΠΜ) of the Hellenic Air Force.

== History ==
In its current form, the airfield was opened in 1946. However, there had been an airfield and operations on the site from 1937.

Elefsina played a crucial role in the final British evacuation during the 1941 Battle of Greece, as recounted by Roald Dahl in his autobiography Going Solo.

== Operations ==
The 112th Combat Wing includes the following units:

- 352 VIP Transport Squadron (352 ΜΜΥΠ) (established in 1957)
- 354 Tactical Transport Squadron (354 ΜΤΜ) (established 1970)
- 355th Tactical Transport Squadron (355th ΜΤΜ) (established 1947)
- 356 Tactical Transport Squadron (356 ΜΤΜ) (established 1953)
- 358 Search and Rescue Squadron (358 ΜΕΔ) (established 1958)
- 384 Search and Rescue Squadron (384 ΜΕΔ) (established in 2006)

Approach operations are handled by the Athens Control Centre, in common with all the other airfields in the area.

=== US Air Force deployment ===
In October 2023, amid the Israel–Hamas war, Elefsina Air Base was designated to accommodate US military transport aircraft as part of an increased American military presence in the Eastern Mediterranean. The deployment was associated with contingency preparations for the possible evacuation of American citizens from Israel and Lebanon, with Elefsina serving a supplementary role to Souda Bay.

Greek government spokesman Pavlos Marinakis stated that the aircraft involved were transport rather than combat aircraft, and clarified that the 112th Combat Wing had not been converted into a US military base.
