= 338th Fighter-Bomber Squadron =

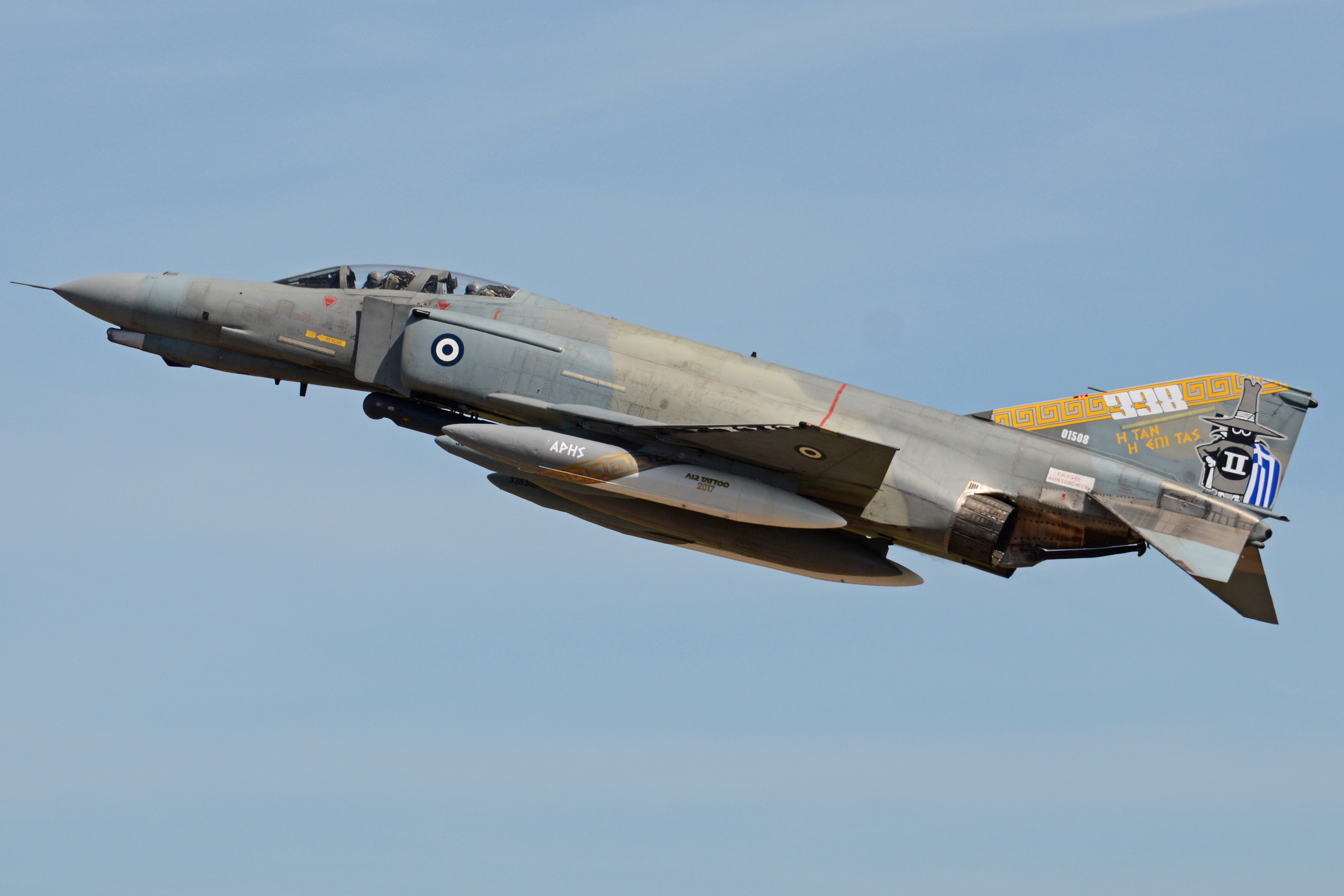
- An F-4E of the 338th Squadron with squadron art on the tail
- Active: 1952–1960; 1964–current
- Branch: Hellenic Air Force
- Role: Fighter-bomber
- Part of: 117th Combat Wing
- Garrison/HQ: Andravida Air Base

Aircraft flown
- Fighter: F-84G (1952–1960); F-84F (1964–1974); F-4E (1974–)

The 338th Fighter-Bomber Squadron (Greek: 338 Μοίρα Διώξεως-Βομβαρδισμού, 338 MΔΒ), callsign "Ares", is a squadron in service with the Hellenic Air Force, forming part of the 117th Combat Wing. It is based at Andravida Air Base, and is the last Hellenic Air Force unit operating the McDonnell Douglas F-4E aircraft.

== History ==
The 338th Fighter-Bomber Squadron was established on 24 December 1952 at Elefsis Air Base, equipped with Republic F-84G Thunderjets. From April 1953 to November 1956 it was based at Larissa Air Base, before returning to Elefsis. In 1958 it became the first unit of the 115th Combat Wing in Souda Air Base on Crete, until the squadron's disbandment in January 1960.

The squadron was reconstituted, still at Souda, in August 1964, equipped with Republic F-84F Thunderstreaks. It continued in operation there until 30 June 1974, when it was disbanded and its aircraft transferred to the 340th Fighter-Bomber Squadron. On 1 July, the squadron was reactivated as part of 117th Combat Wing at Andravida Air Base, equipped with McDonnell Douglas F-4E aircraft. The squadron achieved operational capability with the F-4 in March 1975.

In 1981, the 338th Squadron and the 337th All-Weather Squadron exchanged their F-4E aircraft with one another. In 1991, the F-4Es were replaced with a newer version of the aircraft from the US inventory, as part of the F-4E Southeastern Regional Agreement (SRA). The F-4Es in Greek service were subjected to a further modernization program (Peace Icarus 2000) in the early 2000s.
