= List of Honduran military bases =

The following is a list of military bases in Honduras and of the Military of Honduras:

== Air Bases ==
Operated by the Honduran Air Force:

- Base Aerea Coronel Hector Caraccioli Moncada in La Ceiba
- Base Aerea Coronel Hernan Acosta Mejia in Tegucigalpa
- Base Aerea Coronel Armando Escalon Espinal in Valle de Sula

Operated joint with USAF:

- Base Aerea Soto Cano in Comayagua

== Land Bases ==
- 101 Brigada in Choluteca
- 105 Brigada in San Pedro Sula
- 110 Brigada in Danlí
- 115 Brigada in Juticalpa
- 120 Brigada in Santa Rosa de Copán

== Naval Bases ==
- Base Naval Caratasca
- Base Naval Puerto Cortés
- Base Naval Puerto Castilla
- Base Naval Amapala
