= Sedes Air Base =

Sedes Airport
- IATA: none; ICAO: LGSD

Summary
- Airport type: Military
- Owner: Hellenic Air Force
- Serves: Thessaloniki
- Location: Macedonia, Greece
- Elevation AMSL: 81 ft / 27 m
- Coordinates: 40°32′01.83″N 23°01′26.83″E
- Website: (Website)
- Interactive map of Sedes Airport

Runways
Direction	Length		Surface
Direction	ft	m	Surface
13/31	4,126	1,257	PSP metal mesh

Sedes Airport is a military airport 15 km east of Thessaloniki, Greece, and 3 km northeast of Thessaloniki's Macedonia International Airport. Sedes airport started operating during the Balkan Wars and has since been exclusively used by the Hellenic Air Force. Nowadays it also houses an aviation museum, displaying a variety of old aircraft types.

Sedes is home to the Air Force's 350th Guided Missile Wing and hosts

- Guided Missile Maintenance Squadron
- Guided Missile Training Squadron
- 23rd Guided Missile Squadron - operating MIM-104 Patriot PAC-3 batteries
