= Hellenic Air Force Museum =

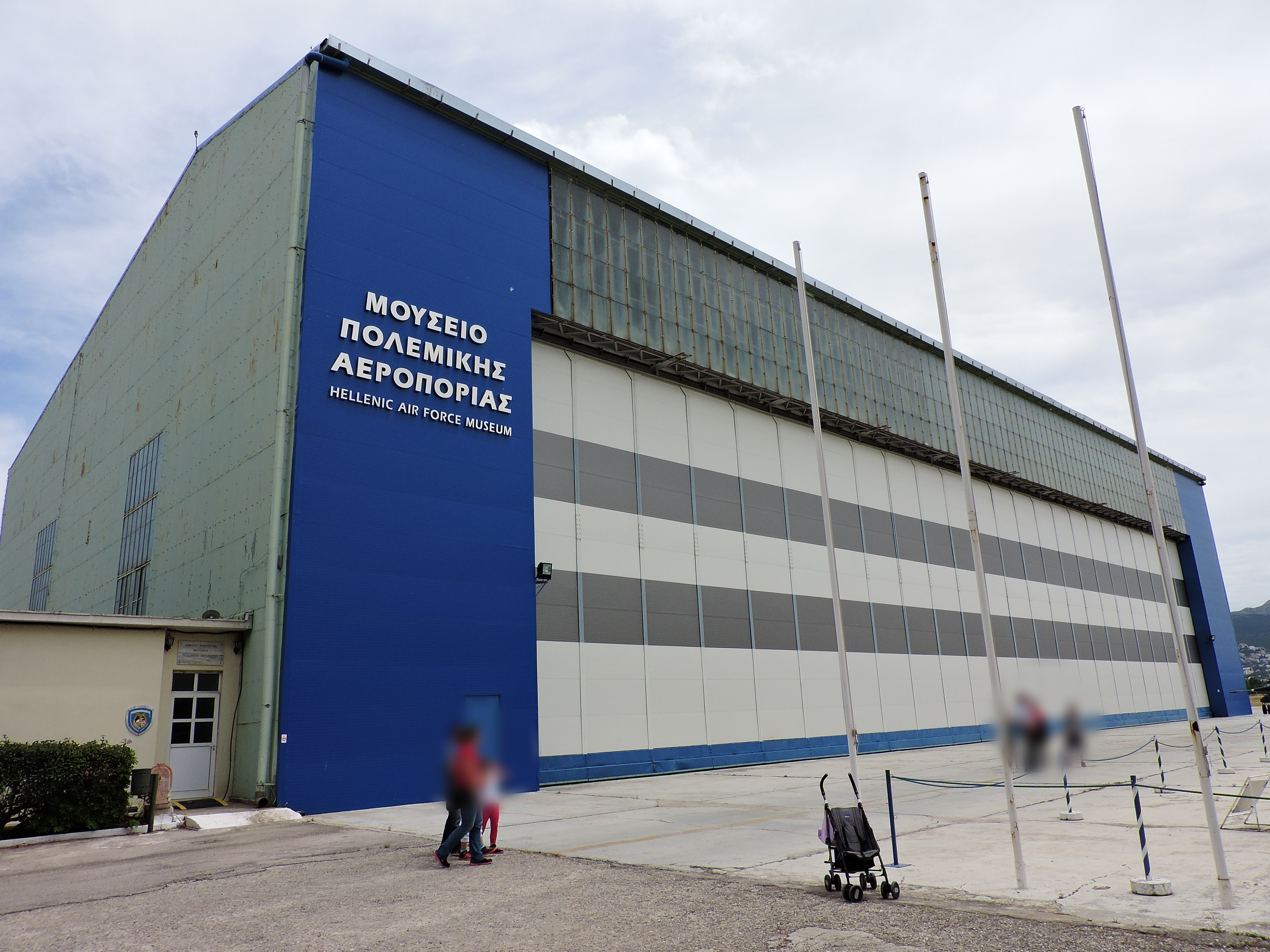
- Exterior of museum hangar

- Location within Greece
- Established: 1992
- Location: Acharnes
- Coordinates: 38°06′17.7″N 23°46′42.4″E
- Type: Aviation museum
- Website: www.haf.gr/en/history/museum

The Hellenic Air Force Museum was founded in 1986 and since 1992 has been located on Dekelia Air Base in Acharnes north of Athens. In opposition to the War Museum of Athens it displays air force history and is active in restoring and presenting old aircraft. Most aircraft in the collection come from the Hellenic Air Force; some were exchanged with other European aircraft museums.

The HAF Underwater Operations Team (KOSYTHE) helped recover some rare aircraft from underwater for the museum: a Bristol Blenheim, a Junkers Ju 52/3m and a Junkers Ju 87.

The museum is open to the public on weekends. School groups may visit on other days with prior approval.

== Aircraft on display ==
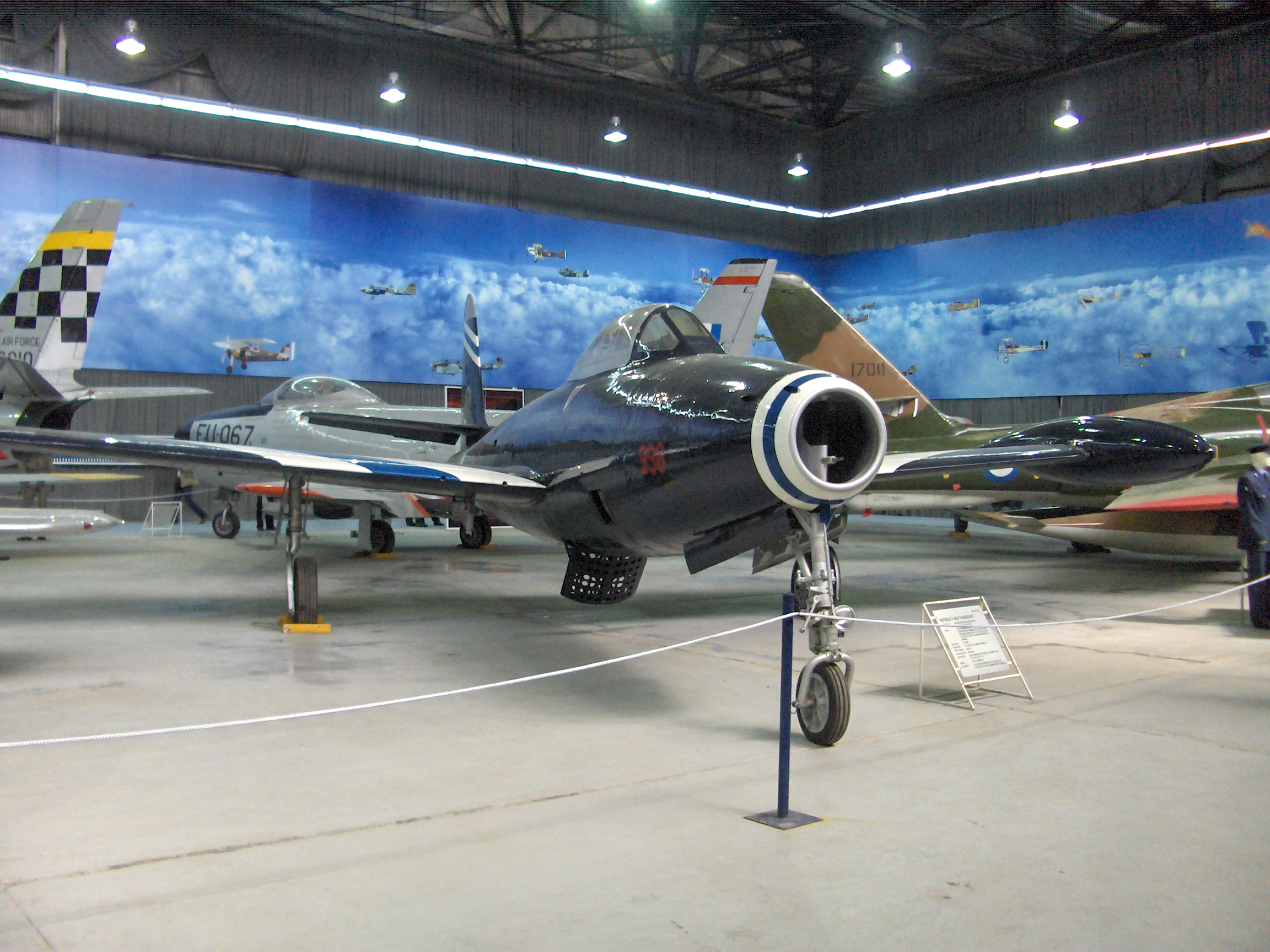
Republic F-84G in the main hangar

- Agusta-Bell 47J-2 Ranger
- Agusta-Bell 206A Jet Ranger II
- Bell OH-13 Sioux
- Canadair CL-13 Sabre Mk.2
- Canadair CL-13 Sabre Mk.2
- Canadair CL-13 Sabre Mk.2
- Canadair CL-13 Sabre Mk.2
- Cessna T-37B Tweet
- Cessna T-37C Tweet
- Convair TF-102A Delta Dagger
- Convair TF-102A Delta Dagger
- Curtiss SB2C-5 Helldiver
- Dassault Mirage F1CG
- De Havilland DH.82A Tiger Moth
- Douglas C-47B Dakota
- Dornier Do-28D-2 Skyservant
- Dornier Do-28D-2 Skyservant
- Grumman G-159 Gulfstream I
- Grumman HU-16B Albatross
- Grumman HU-16B Albatross
- Lockheed F-104G Starfighter
- Lockheed F-104G Starfighter
- Lockheed F-104G Starfighter
- Lockheed TF-104G Starfighter
- Lockheed T-33A
- Lockheed T-33A
- LTV A-7E Corsair II
- LTV A-7E Corsair II
- LTV A-7H Corsair II
- McDonnell Douglas RF-4E Phantom II
- Mignet HM.14
- Northrop F-5A Freedom Fighter
- Northrop RF-5A Tigereye
- Nord N.2501 Noratlas
- North American F-86D Sabre
- North American T-6G Texan
- Republic F-84F Thunderstreak
- Republic F-84G Thunderjet
- Republic RF-84F Thunderflash
- Sikorsky UH-19B Chickasaw
- Supermarine Spitfire Mk IXc
- WSK-1 Mielec Lim-2Rbis

Unrestored aircraft

- Arado Ar 196 A-5
- Bristol Blenheim Mk IVF
- Junkers Ju 52/mg8e
- Junkers Ju 87 D-3

== See also ==
- List of aviation museums
