= Andravida Air Base =

Andravida AB
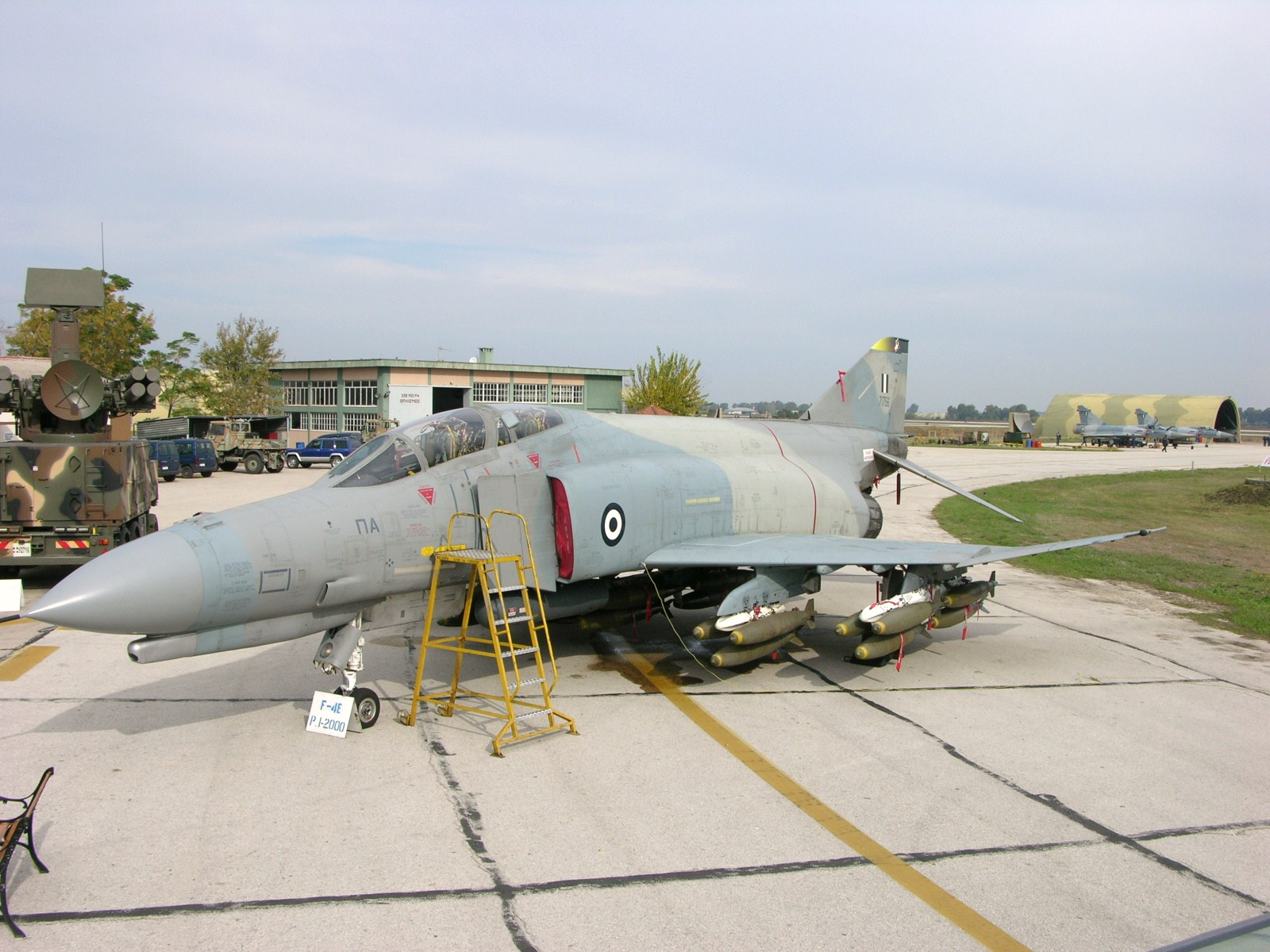
- One of 339th Squadron's F-4E aircraft at Andravida
- IATA: PYR; ICAO: LGAD

Summary
- Airport type: Military
- Owner: Hellenic Air Force
- Operator: 117th Combat Wing
- Location: Andravida, Greece
- Elevation AMSL: 55 ft / 17 m
- Coordinates: 37°56′N 21°17′E
- Interactive map of Andravida AB

Runways
Direction	Length		Surface
Direction	ft	m	Surface
16/34	10,299	3,139	Asphalt

Andravida Air Base (Greek: Αεροπορική Βάση Ανδραβίδας) is a military airport operated by the Hellenic Air Force, located 2.5 kilometres from the town of Andravida in Elis, Greece, housing the 117th Combat Wing (117 Πτέρυγα Μάχης, 117 ΠΜ), and the Air Force's Air Tactics Center (Κέντρο Αεροπορικής Τακτικής, ΚΕΑΤ).

== History ==
Construction on the Andravida base began in 1955, with the first air detachment established there in June 1960. In March 1961, the detachment was transformed into the 117th Combat Group (117 Σμηναρχία Μάχης), comprising the F-84F-equipped 339th Fighter-Bomber Squadron.

In May 1969, the unit was upgraded to a full combat wing, and chosen to receive into service the F-4E Phantom fighters. This necessitated extensive reconstruction and upgrading of the existing facilities, and in 1973, 339th Squadron had to be relocated to the nearby Araxos Air Base. Among other infrastructure changes, a third runway and a weather radar were added by 1978. The first F-4E aircraft arrived in April 1974, and deliveries were completed by the end of the year, allowing for the equipment of two squadrons: the returning 339th Squadron, now designated "339th All-Weather Squadron", took up an interceptor role, and the 338th Fighter-Bomber Squadron. 339 Squadron disbanded on 31st October 2017, but 338 Squadron remains at Andravida under 117th CW to this day.

In 1975, the Weapons-Tactics School (Σχολείο Όπλων Τακτικής, ΣΟΤ) was established at Andravida, providing advanced courses on air tactics and electronic warfare. In addition, the 368th Applied Training Flight, of four Lockheed T-33, was formed at Andravida in December 1976 and operated until March 1989. In 1983, the Weapons-Tactics School, along with the rest of the Air Force's various advanced schools, which until then were scattered among a number of air bases and operated under different directorates, were consolidated in a single unit, the Air Tactics Center, a combat wing-level unit also based at Andravida.

Every year the Tactical Weapons School of the Air Tactics Centre hosts Exercise Iniochos which practices offensive and defensive counter air, tactical reconnaissance and combat search and rescue.
