= Kalamata International Airport =

Airport in Kalamata, Greece

Kalamata International Airport "Captain Vassilis Constantakopoulos" Κρατικός Αερολιμένας Καλαμάτας
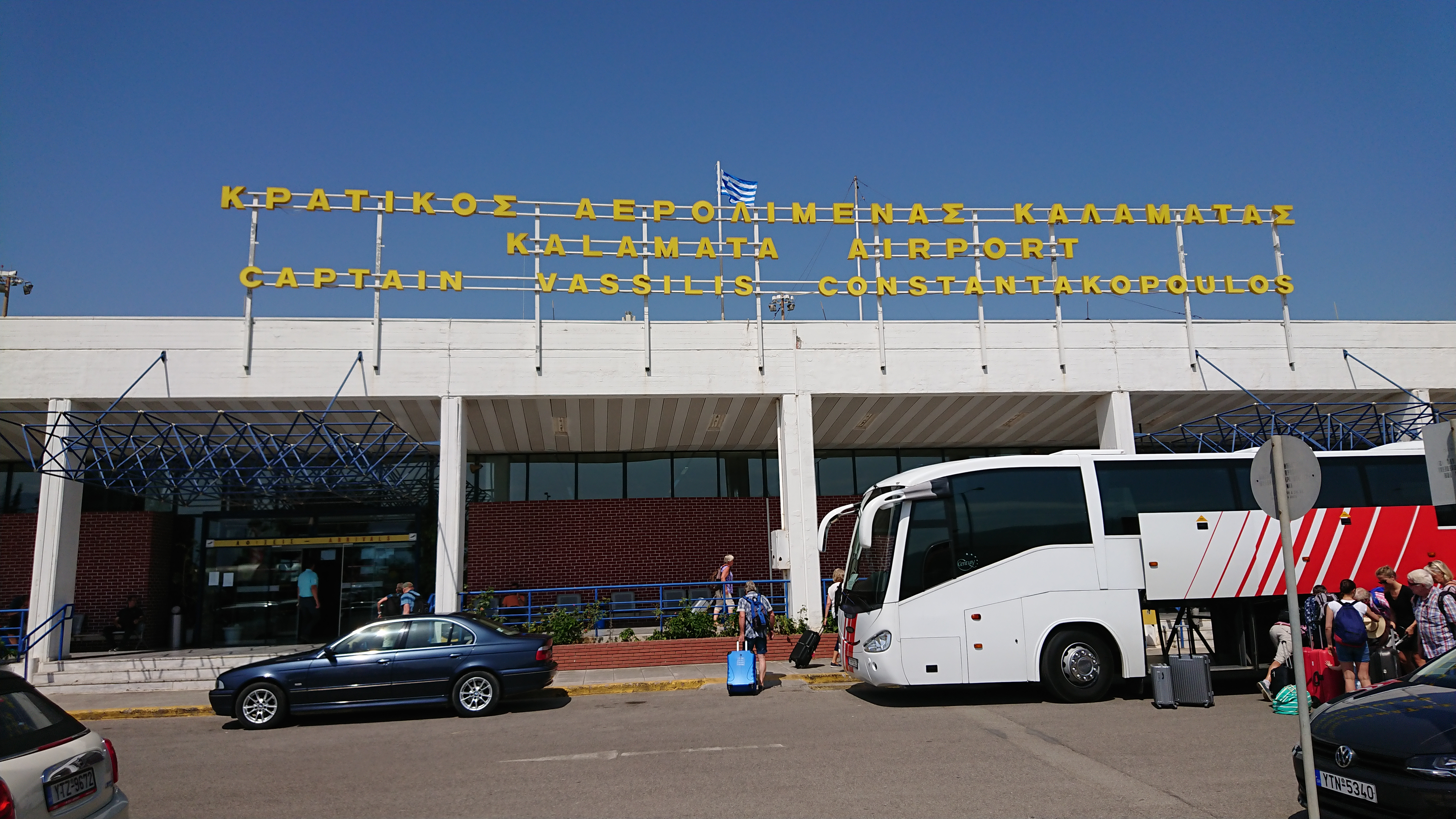
- IATA: KLX; ICAO: LGKL

Summary
- Airport type: Public / Military
- Owner: Greek state
- Operator: HCAA
- Location: Kalamata, Peloponnese, Greece
- Focus city for: Aegean Airlines
- Elevation AMSL: 26 ft (7.9 m)
- Coordinates: 37°04′06″N 22°01′32″E

Map
- Location within Greece

Runways
Direction	Length		Surface
Direction	ft	m	Surface
17R/35L	8,868	2,703	Asphalt
~~17L/35R~~	~~9,436~~	~~2,876~~	(now taxiway)

Statistics (2018)
- Passengers: 278,961
- Passenger traffic change: ▲0.9%
- Aircraft movements: 2,601
- Aircraft movements change: ▼23.2%
- Runway Statistics

Kalamata International Airport (Greek: Κρατικός Αερολιμένας Καλαμάτας) (IATA: KLX, ICAO: LGKL) "Captain Vassilis Constantakopoulos" is an airport in the city of Kalamata, Greece. It mainly receives flights during the summer. In March 2013, Aegean Airlines opened a base in the airport.

== Overview ==
=== Civilian airport ===
The airport is located between Kalamata and Messini on the EO82 road (Pylos – Kalamata – Sparta) and west of the train tracks on the Pamisos River plain. The runway is about 2.7 km long and runs from north to south from the highway north to the plain. The terminal lies to the east and is accessed by the EO82, which leads to the A7 motorway and the EO7 road.

=== Military air base ===
There is a military base of the Hellenic Air Force and since 1976, an air-training center, the Instrument Flight Training Center (gr.Κέντρο Εκπαίδευσης Ενόργανης Πτήσης) of the 120th Air Training Wing to the west of the runway. Since 2021, the military air base houses the International Flight Training Center after a collaboration of Elbit Systems and HAF. The air base uses the same runway as civilian aircraft.

== History ==
Kalamata International Airport was opened in 1959. Charter flights began to operate out of the airport in 1986 and a new terminal was built in 1991. The same year Hellenic Civil Aviation took over as operator of the airport. In 2012 the airport was renamed after Vassilis C. Constantakopoulos.

== Airlines and destinations ==
The following airlines operate regular scheduled and charter flights at Kalamata Airport:

Airlines	Destinations
Aegean Airlines	Thessaloniki; Seasonal: Athens, Heraklion, Munich, Stockholm–Arlanda
Air France	Seasonal: Paris–Charles de Gaulle
arkia	Seasonal: Tel Aviv
Austrian Airlines	Seasonal: Vienna
British Airways	Seasonal: London–Gatwick
Condor	Seasonal: Düsseldorf, Frankfurt, Hamburg, Munich
Discover Airlines	Seasonal: Frankfurt
easyJet	Seasonal: London–Gatwick, Manchester
Edelweiss Air	Seasonal: Zurich
Eurowings	Seasonal: Düsseldorf
Jet2.com	Seasonal: Birmingham, Bristol, Edinburgh, London–Gatwick, London–Stansted, Manchester
Marathon Airlines	Seasonal charter: Innsbruck
Ryanair	Seasonal: Katowice, Milan Bergamo, Vienna
Scandinavian Airlines	Seasonal: Stockholm–Arlanda
Swiss International Air Lines	Seasonal: Geneva
Transavia	Seasonal: Amsterdam, Paris–Orly
Wizz Air	Tirana; Seasonal: Budapest

== Accidents and incidents ==
- On 16 October 1971, an NAMC YS-11 turboprop regional airliner of Olympic Airways was hijacked. It had departed from Kalamata International Airport to Hellinikon International Airport. There was one hijacker, who demanded to be taken to Lebanon. All 64 passengers and crew survived after the aircraft was stormed and the hijacker arrested. The hijacking lasted less than a day.
- In November 2001, fourteen plane spotters (twelve British and two Dutch) were arrested by the police after being ob

== Ground Transport ==
Travelling to and from Kalamata Airport by bus is convenient, with good connections between the Airport and Kalamata. The bus pick up and drop off point is located close to the terminal building. Bus rides between the airport and Kalamata take 20 – 25 minutes.

The airport has been criticised for the lack of public transport. The only way to reach the airport is by car, taxi or bus. The neighboring railway line to Messini and Kalamata was shut down in 2011.

== See also ==
- Transport in Greece
