= Tanagra Air Base =

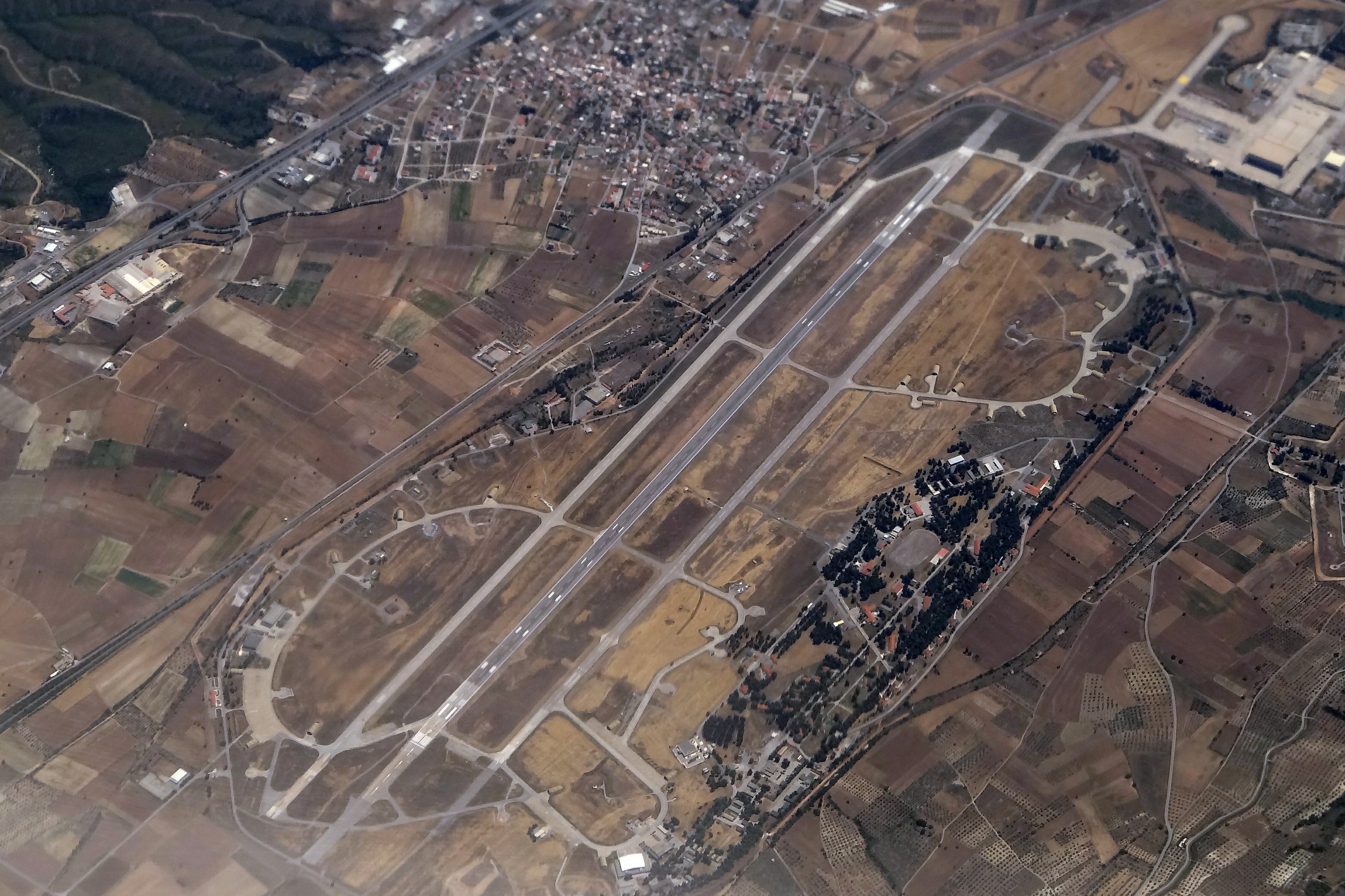
- Aerial view of the Tanagra Air Base in 2013
- IATA: none; ICAO: LGTG

Summary
- Airport type: Military
- Owner: Hellenic Air Force
- Operator: 114th Combat Wing
- Location: Tanagra, Greece
- Elevation AMSL: 485 ft (148 m)
- Coordinates: 38°20′23.45″N 23°33′53.85″E
- Interactive map of Tanagra Air Base

Runways
Direction	Length		Surface
Direction	ft	m	Surface
10/28	9,810	2,990	Asphalt

Tanagra Air Base (ICAO: LGTG) is a large military air base situated in Tanagra, Greece. The air base is adjacent to Hellenic Aerospace Industry facilities. It is used as the home-base of the 114th Combat Wing (114 Πτέρυγα Μάχης, 114 ΠΜ) of the Hellenic Air Force.

== History ==
From World War II until the early 1950s, Tanagra Air Base was used as a complementary airfield. After that period, and with NATO contribution, it was upgraded to a main air base of the Hellenic Air Force. From 1975 to 2003 Dassault Mirage F1CG were operated from Tanagra. Starting in 2007, newly acquired Dassault Mirage 2000-5 are operated by the 331st All Weather Squadron.

It had been proposed in the 1980s that a civil terminal would be built at the airport, rendering Tanagra as a secondary Athens airport, to complement Ellinikon International Airport, which was going to be expanded. This plan was dropped when it was decided to construct the current Athens International Airport "Eleftherios Venizelos" in the Spata area east of Athens.

Since 2016, Tanagra Air Base has been the venue of the annual Athens Flying Week airshow, held in September each year.

On January 19, 2022 332st All Weather Squadron received its first 6 Dassault Rafale F3R fighters and retired its aging Dassault Mirage-2000EG/BG fighters upon a ceremony held by the Hellenic Air Force.

On September 5, 2026, a F-4E AUP Phantom II fighter of 338th Fighter-Bomber Squadron crashed during the Athens Flying Week. Two pilots were killed.
