= Tatoi Airport =

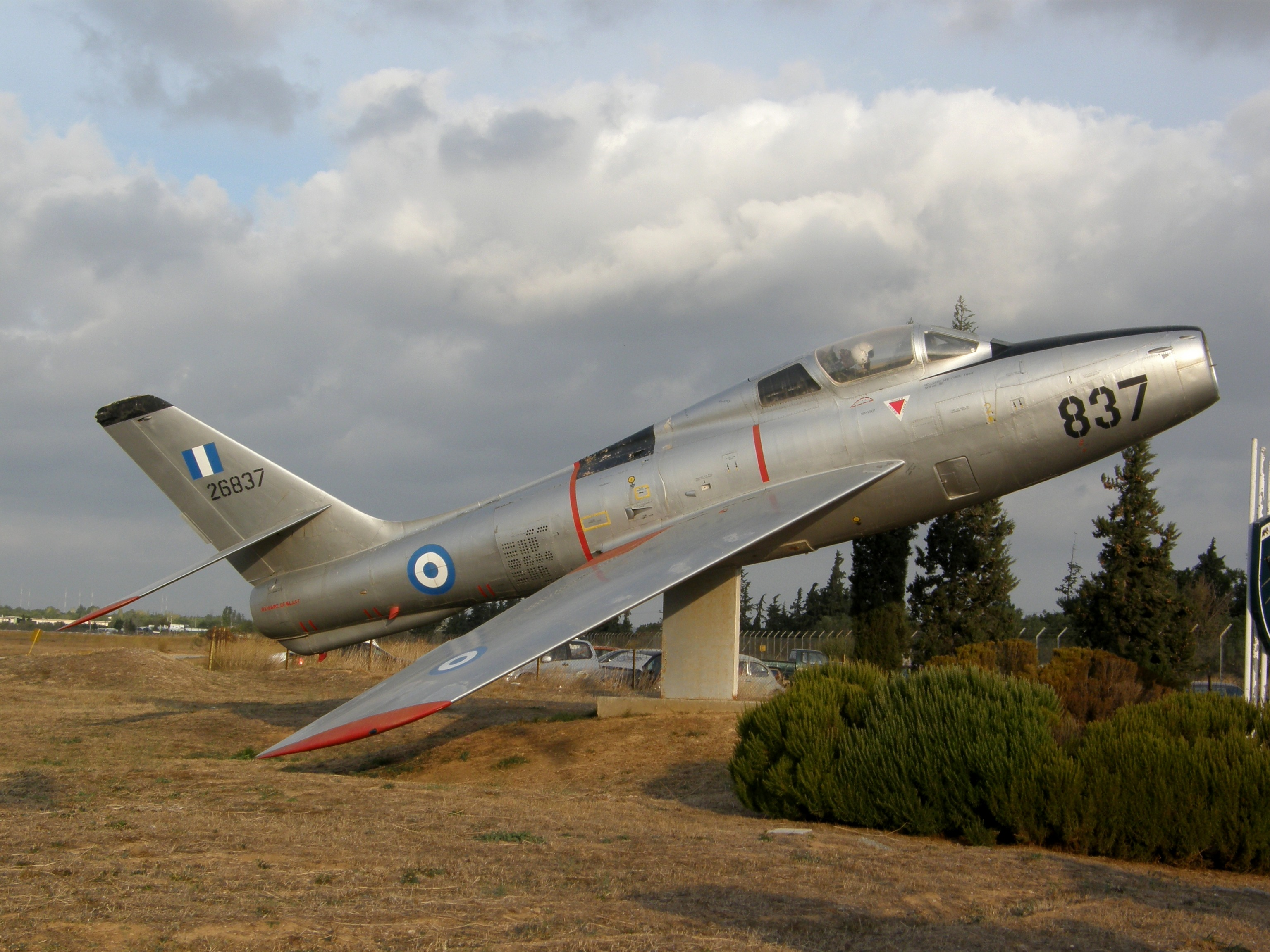
- Republic F-84F Thunderstreak static display near the central gate of the airport
- IATA: none; ICAO: LGTT

Summary
- Airport type: Public/Military
- Owner: Hellenic Air Force
- Location: Tatoi, Decelea
- Elevation AMSL: 785 ft (239 m)
- Coordinates: 38°06′34″N 023°47′03″E
- Interactive map of Tatoi Airport

Runways
Direction	Length		Surface
Direction	ft	m	Surface
03/21	5,789	1,764	Asphalt

Tatoi Airport (ICAO: LGTT) is an airport located north of Athens, in Decelea. It started operating in 1918 and it now has a single runway with a length of 1764m (not counting the 347m threshold). The airport is used by the Hellenic Air Force and is the base of the following aeroclubs:

- Athens Gliding Club
- Dekeleia Aeroclub
- Athens Aeroclub
- Mesogeion Aeroclub

It has also been used by many other aeroclubs of Attica. Moreover, the Hellenic Air Force Museum is situated at the airport which contains many old aircraft.

== Former airlines and destinations ==
Airlines	Destinations
Air France	Akyab, Allahabad, Baghdad, Bangkok, Bushehr, Calcutta, Castelrosso, Corfu, Damascus, Dezful, Hanoi, Jodhpur, Karachi, London-Croydon, Marseille, Naples, Paris-Orly, Rangoon, Vientiane

== Accidents and incidents ==
On 27 December 1991, Hellenic Air Force Douglas C-47B KK171 was damaged beyond repair in an accident at Tatoi Air Base. One of the six crew members was killed.

== Climate ==
Tatoi has a hot-summer Mediterranean climate (Csa) with hot summers and cool winters.

Climate data for Tatoi, 235 m asl (1958–1997)
Month	Jan	Feb	Mar	Apr	May	Jun	Jul	Aug	Sep	Oct	Nov	Dec	Year
Mean daily maximum °C (°F)	11.7 (53.1)	12.5 (54.5)	14.7 (58.5)	19.3 (66.7)	24.9 (76.8)	29.9 (85.8)	32.1 (89.8)	31.8 (89.2)	28.0 (82.4)	22.5 (72.5)	17.4 (63.3)	13.2 (55.8)	21.5 (70.7)
Mean daily minimum °C (°F)	3.2 (37.8)	3.5 (38.3)	4.9 (40.8)	7.7 (45.9)	11.9 (53.4)	16.2 (61.2)	19.2 (66.6)	19.3 (66.7)	15.6 (60.1)	11.8 (53.2)	7.9 (46.2)	4.9 (40.8)	10.5 (50.9)
Average precipitation mm (inches)	69.2 (2.72)	48.6 (1.91)	51.1 (2.01)	26.2 (1.03)	20.4 (0.80)	9.8 (0.39)	10.0 (0.39)	6.0 (0.24)	17.6 (0.69)	47.6 (1.87)	60.2 (2.37)	83.9 (3.30)	450.6 (17.72)
Source: Hellenic National Meteorological Service
