= Tripoli Airport (Greece) =

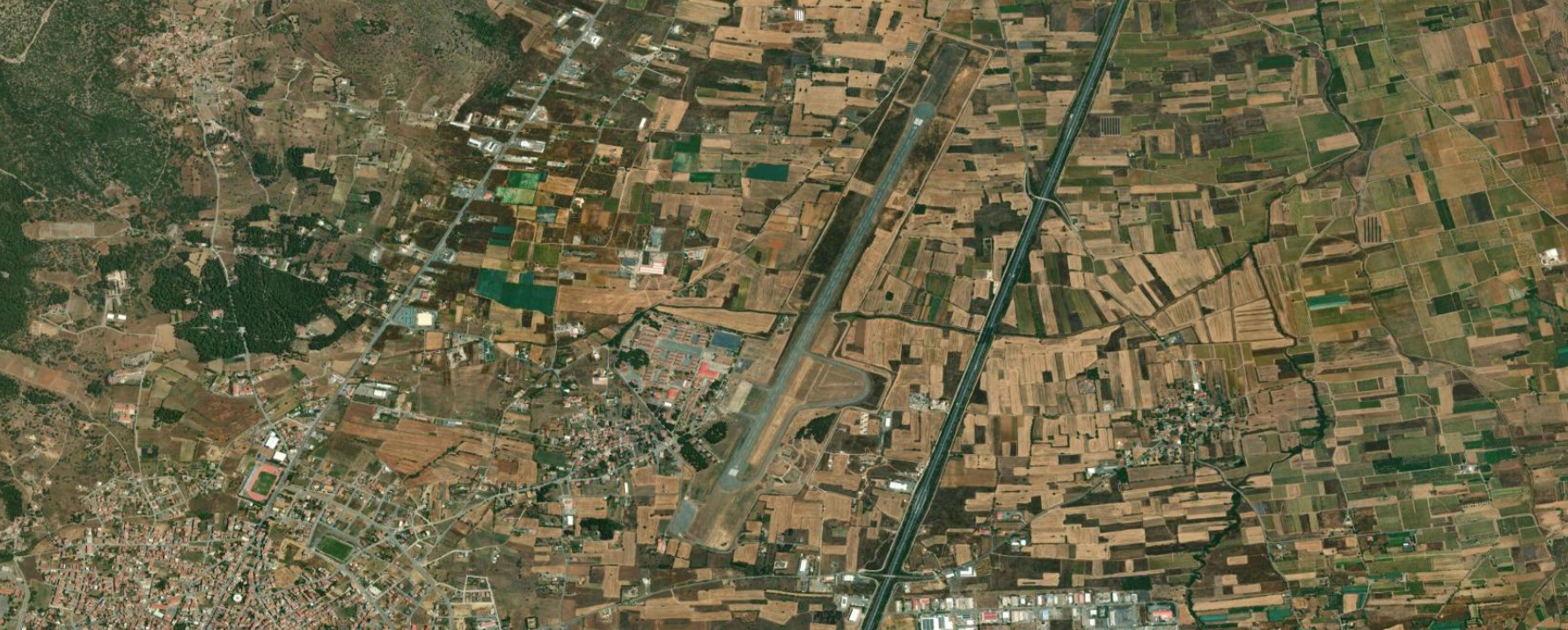
- IATA: none; ICAO: LGTP

Summary
- Airport type: Military
- Location: Tripoli, Greece
- Elevation AMSL: 2,113 ft (644 m)
- Coordinates: 37°31′36.38″N 22°24′05.24″E
- Interactive map of Tripoli Airport

Runways
Direction	Length		Surface
Direction	ft	m	Surface
02/20	6,373	1,942	Asphalt
- Source:(WorldAero Data)

Tripoli Airport (ICAO: LGTP) is a military airbase situated in Tripoli, Greece, that started operating in 1973. It has a single lighted runway (02/20). It is used sparsely by the Hellenic Air Force. In the past it was also the base of the Arcadia Aeroclub. It also serves as a race track for dragster races.
