= Nea Anchialos National Airport =

Nea Anchialos National Airport Κρατικός Αερολιμένας Νέας Αγχιάλου
- IATA: VOL; ICAO: LGBL

Summary
- Airport type: Public
- Owner: Greek State
- Serves: Magnesia, Thessaly, Greece
- Location: Nea Anchialos
- Elevation AMSL: 83 ft (25 m)
- Coordinates: 39°13′10″N 022°47′39″E
- Website: www.volosairport.gr

Map
- Location of airport in Greece

Runways
Direction	Length		Surface
Direction	m	ft	Surface
08/26	2,759	9,052	Asphalt

Statistics (2018)
- Passengers: 41,357
- Passenger traffic change: ▲36.1%
- Aircraft movements: 452
- Aircraft movements change: ▲22.2%
- Sources:HCAA, DAFIF

Nea Anchialos National Airport (Greek: Κρατικός Αερολιμένας Νέας Αγχιάλου) (IATA: VOL, ICAO: LGBL) is an airport located near the town of Nea Anchialos in Greece, serving the city of Volos and the rest of the regional unit of Magnesia. It is also known as Central Greece Airport.

== Overview ==
The airport is at an elevation of 83 feet (25 m) above mean sea level. It has one runway designated 08/26 with an asphalt surface measuring 2,759 by 45 metres (9,052 ft × 148 ft). It is designed to be upgraded over the ensuing years in order to accommodate the increase in air travel and its upgrades are planned in a six-phase framework. It currently has one terminal.

The airport is developed by public partnership and began operation in February 1991. It is the only civilian airport that serves the cities of Volos, Almyros, Lamia, Larisa, Farsala, Kalampaka, Trikala, and Karditsa. The airport is located between the towns of Nea Anchialos, Almyros, Velestino and Farsala, about 6 km (3.7 mi) northeast of Almyros town center, 15 km (9.3 mi) southwest of New Anchialos and 24 km (15 mi) southwest of Volos city center, in the Magnesia regional unit, in Thessaly.

== Airlines and destinations ==
The following airlines operate regular scheduled and charter flights at Nea Anchialos Airport:

Airlines	Destinations
Eurowings	Seasonal: Düsseldorf
Ryanair	Seasonal: Charleroi
Sky Express	Seasonal: Heraklion
Smartwings	Seasonal: Brno

== Ground transport ==
There is a bus connecting airport and Volos bus station. Buses are waiting to pick up travelers after a plane lands. The airport is also accessible by the E75 highway.

== See also ==
- Transport in Greece
