= Larissa National Airport =

Larissa State Airport "Thessaly"
- IATA: LRA; ICAO: LGLR

Summary
- Airport type: ~~Public~~/Military
- Location: Larissa
- Built: 1912
- In use: Hellenic Air Force
- Occupants: 110th Combat Wing
- Elevation AMSL: 207 ft (63 m)
- Coordinates: 39°38′56.76″N 22°27′55.63″E
- Interactive map of Larissa State Airport "Thessaly"

Runways
Direction	Length		Surface
Direction	ft	m	Surface
~~08/26~~	9,711	2,960	Asphalt
08R/26L	9,711	2,960	Asphalt
- Commercial use of the airport until 1997

Larissa State Airport "Thessaly" (Greek: Κρατικός Αερολιμένας Λάρισσας "Θεσσαλία") (IATA: LRA, ICAO: LGLR) was built in 1912. It was the commercial airport of Larissa until 1997 when it closed for civilian traffic. Currently the airport is being used only by military aircraft of the Hellenic Air Force, whose 110th Combat Wing (110 Πτέρυγα Μάχης, 110 ΠΜ) is stationed there. The runways do not have an ILS.

== Location of the airport ==
The airport is very close to the city and to the suburban railway line to Thessaloniki (3 km).

== USAF ==
In May 2018, it was announced that US Air Force (USAF) MQ-9 Reaper drones were temporarily based at Larissa while their usual base in Africa was being updated, according to a Pentagon spokesman, Eric Pahon. Although he declined to say which base was the normal site for MQ-9s, it is known that the USAF has been expanding facilities for MQ-9s at Nigerien Air Base 201 (Agadez) in Niger. US assistant secretary of state for European and Eurasian affairs A. Wess Mitchell also discussed the possibility of relocating a significant portion of US military assets to the premises.
