= Smartwings Poland =

Charter airline of Poland

IATA	ICAO	Call sign
3Z	TVP	JETTRAVEL
- Founded: May 2012; 14 years ago
- Operating bases: Katowice; Warsaw–Chopin
- Fleet size: 1
- Parent company: Smartwings
- Headquarters: Warsaw, Poland
- Website: www.smartwings.com

Smartwings Poland Sp. z o.o., formerly Travel Service Polska Sp. z o.o., is a Polish charter airline based in Warsaw. The airline commenced operations in May 2012 from Warsaw Chopin Airport, and is a subsidiary airline of Czech airline Smartwings. As part of a rebranding exercise in 2018, Smartwings Poland, along with other companies in the Travel Service group, had their name changed from Travel Service to Smartwings and their aircraft repainted.

== Destinations ==
Smartwings Poland serves the following leisure destinations:

Country	City	Airport	Notes	Ref.
Albania	Tirana	Tirana International Airport Nënë Tereza	Seasonal charter	
Bulgaria	Burgas	Burgas Airport	Seasonal charter	
Bulgaria	Varna	Varna Airport		
Croatia	Split	Split Saint Jerome Airport		
Cuba	Cayo Coco	Jardines del Rey Airport		
Cuba	Santa Clara	Abel Santamaría Airport		
Cyprus	Larnaca	Larnaca International Airport	Seasonal charter	
Dominican Republic	Punta Cana	Punta Cana International Airport		
Egypt	Sharm El Sheikh	Sharm El Sheikh International Airport		
Egypt	Hurghada	Hurghada International Airport	Seasonal charter	
Egypt	Taba	Taba International Airport	Seasonal charter	
Georgia	Kutaisi	Kutaisi International Airport		
Greece	Chania	Chania International Airport	Seasonal charter	
Greece	Heraklion	Heraklion International Airport	Seasonal charter	
Greece	Kavala	Kavala International Airport	Seasonal charter	
Greece	Rhodes	Rhodes International Airport	Seasonal	
Greece	Thessaloniki	Thessaloniki Airport	Seasonal charter	
Greece	Zakynthos	Zakynthos International Airport		
Israel	Tel Aviv	David Ben Gurion International Airport	Terminated	
Italy	Catania	Catania–Fontanarossa Airport	Seasonal charter	
Italy	Palermo	Falcone Borsellino Airport	Seasonal charter	
Montenegro	Tivat	Tivat Airport	Begins 29 May 2025	
Morocco	Agadir	Agadir–Al Massira Airport		
Oman	Muscat	Muscat International Airport	Seasonal charter	
Poland	Gdańsk	Gdańsk Lech Wałęsa Airport	Seasonal charter	
Poland	Katowice	Katowice International Airport	Hub	
Poland	Łódź	Łódź Władysław Reymont Airport		
Poland	Poznań	Poznań–Ławica Airport	Seasonal charter	
Poland	Warsaw	Warsaw Chopin Airport	Hub	
Poland	Wrocław	Wrocław Airport		
Poland	Bydgoszcz	Bydgoszcz Ignacy Jan Paderewski Airport		
Portugal	Madeira	Madeira Airport		
Tanzania	Zanzibar	Abeid Amani Karume International Airport		
Thailand	Krabi	Krabi International Airport		
Tunisia	Enfidha	Enfidha–Hammamet International Airport		
Tunisia	Tabarka	Tabarka–Aïn Draham International Airport	begins 2 June 2025	
Turkey	Antalya	Antalya Airport	Seasonal charter	
Turkey	Bodrum	Milas–Bodrum Airport	Seasonal charter	
Turkey	Dalaman	Dalaman Airport	Seasonal charter	
Spain	Fuerteventura	Fuerteventura Airport		
Spain	Las Palmas	Gran Canaria Airport		
Spain	Palma de Mallorca	Palma de Mallorca Airport	Seasonal charter	
Spain	Tenerife	Tenerife South Airport	Seasonal charter	
Sri Lanka	Colombo	Bandaranaike International Airport	Seasonal charter	

== Fleet ==
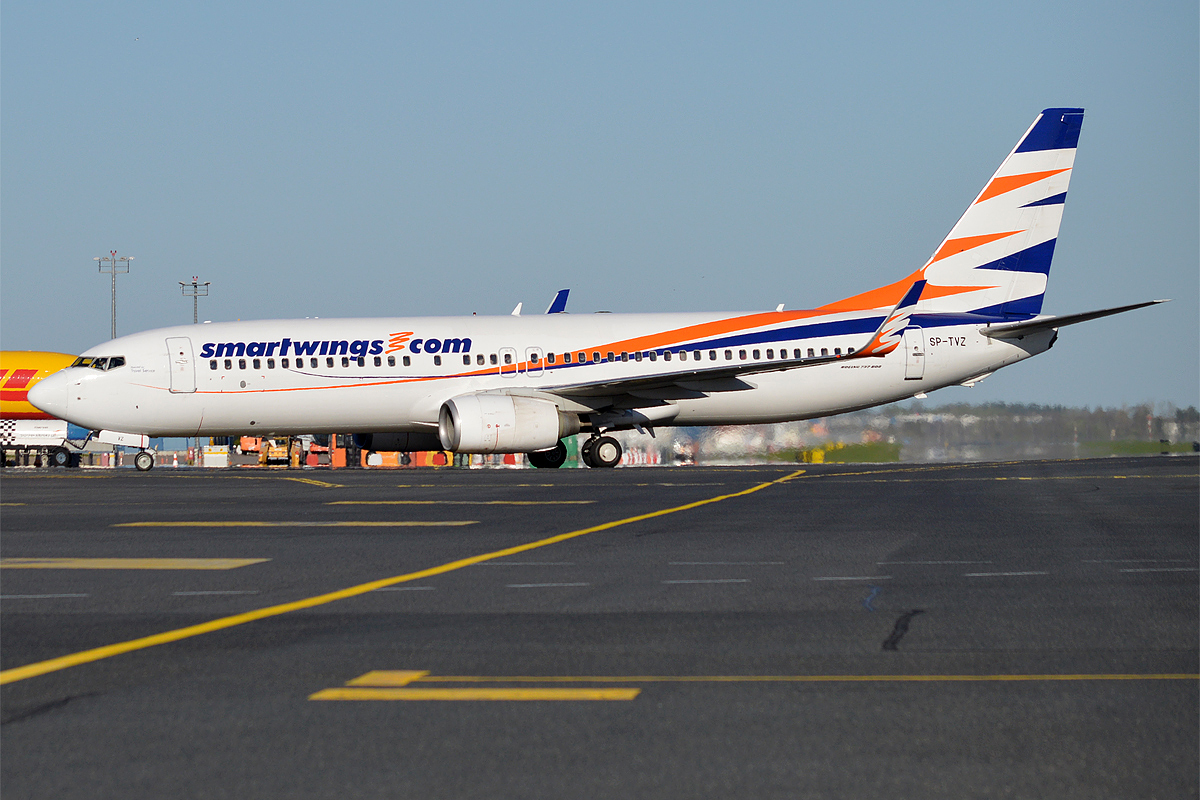
Smartwings Poland's only Boeing 737-800

As of August 2025, Smartwings Poland operates the following aircraft:

Aircraft	In service	Orders	Passengers			Notes
Aircraft	In service	Orders	C	Y	Total	Notes
Boeing 737-800	1	—	–	189	189	
Total	1	—				

Smartwings Poland also uses Boeing 737-800 aircraft of their parent company Smartwings to cover its flights.

== Historical fleet ==
Smartwings Poland previously operated an Airbus A330-200 leased from Air Transat between 2016 and 2019.
