= Air VIA =

Airline

Air VIA Ер Виа

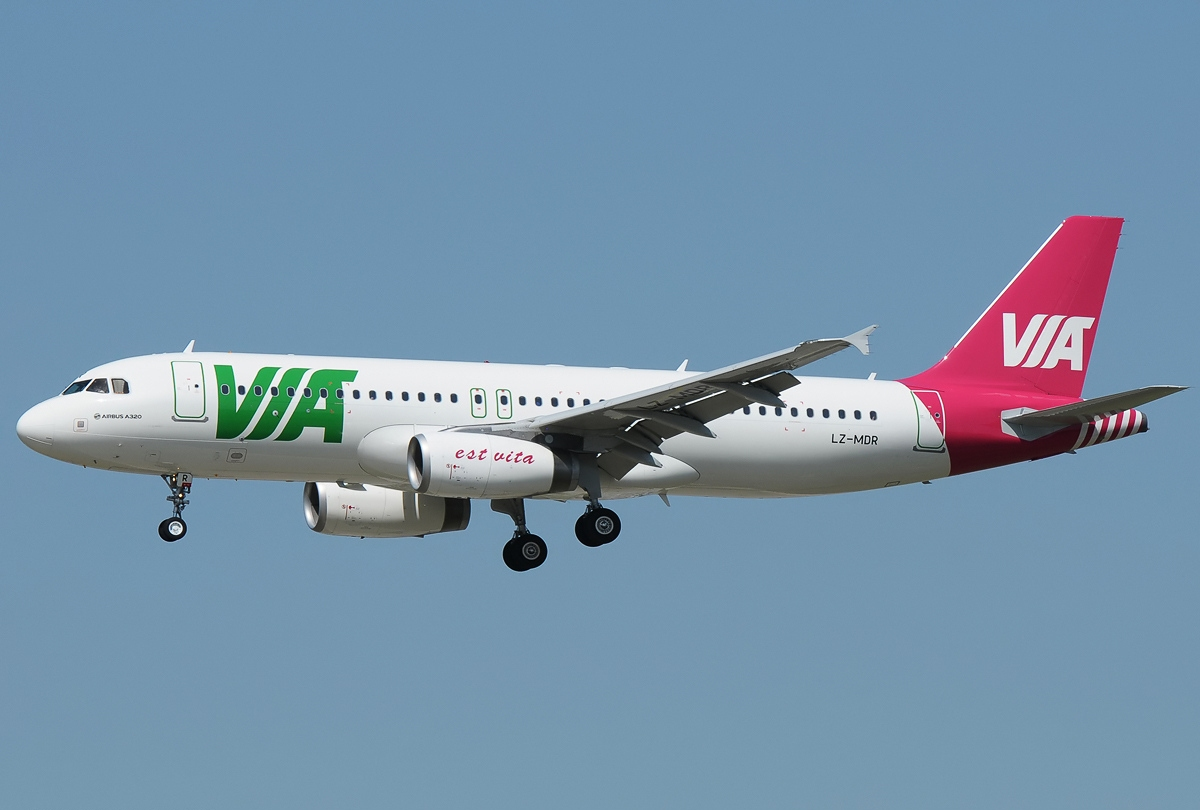
- Airbus A320-200
IATA	ICAO	Call sign
VL	VIM	CRYSTAL
- Founded: 1990
- Ceased operations: 2016
- Operating bases: Sofia Airport; Burgas Airport; Varna Airport
- Fleet size: 5
- Destinations: 26
- Headquarters: Sofia, Bulgaria
- Key people: Denis Barekov, Mihail Donsky
- Revenue: ▼€43.9 million (2016)
- Net income: ▼ -€0.5 million (2016)
- Website: air-via.com

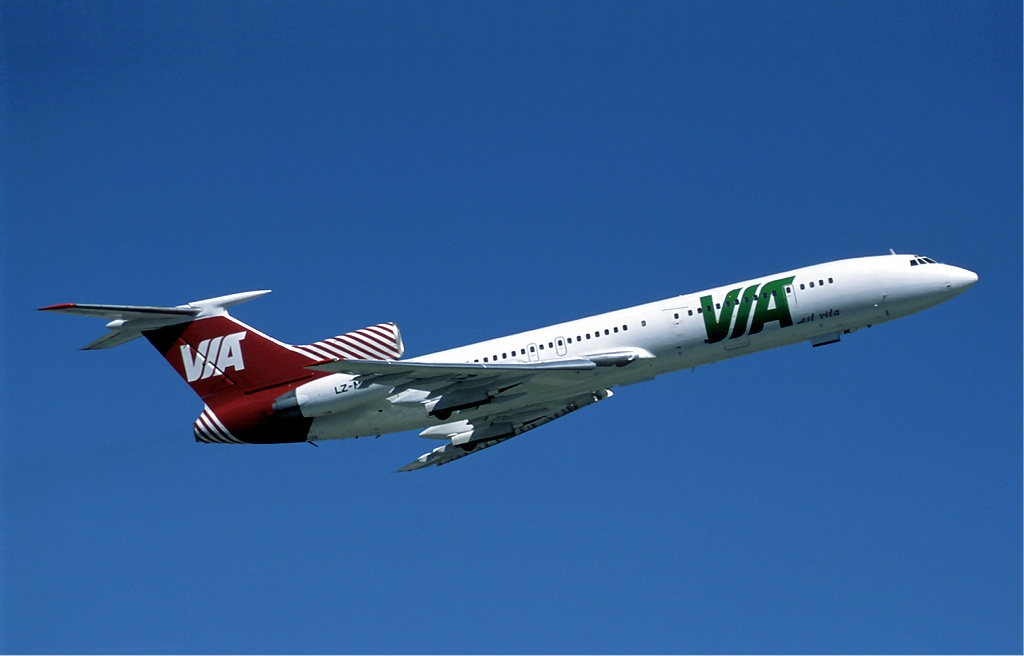
Tupolev Tu-154M

Air VIA was a charter airline with its head office in Sofia, Bulgaria, that operated charter flights on behalf of European tour operators such as TUI and Thomas Cook. Most Air VIA flights operated from European destinations into Varna Airport and Burgas Airport, the airline also offered ACMI and wet lease subservices to many other clients and destinations.

== History ==
The airline was founded in 1990 with the initial corporate name Varna International Airways by a group of private Bulgarian investors and from 1991 performed charter flights for Bulgarian and leading European tour operators such as Neckermann, TUI Travel, Jetairfly, Thomas Cook and Prodintour to and from Bulgarian seaside resorts. The company was licensed and certified according to the Bulgarian and EU regulations to transport passengers and cargo. Between 1990 and 2005, Air VIA operated with 5 new Tupolev TU-154M aircraft. In 1994 the airline was acquired by Denis Barekov, a Bulgarian entrepreneur, who had investments in mining, glass production, real-estate and other industries.

In 2005, Air VIA changed its fleet due to the ever growing competition, EU regulations, increasing fuel prices and higher customer requirements. In the summer of 2006, Air VIA started to operate Airbus A320 aircraft and phased out the dated Tupolev-154M. On 28 August 2015, Air VIA added its first Airbus A321-200 to its fleet. Air VIA operated for 25 years in Europe, Africa, the Middle East, Asia and in other regions for many different clients under ACMI or Charter contracts. The airline has operated in all European countries, but also in Saudi Arabia, Iraq, Vietnam, Pakistan and in many other countries. In 2016, Air VIA ceased flight operations. At present, the company is considering different opportunities to restore its flight operations.

In 2012, Mr. Denis Barekov and the Air Via management team assisted an investor from Iceland in the creation of WOW Air, the low-cost passenger airline based in Iceland. Air Via managed the complete flight operations of WOW Air until 2016 by providing its expertise, 3 aircraft (under WOW Air livery), its crews, maintenance and management staff. In 2016, Mr. Denis Barekov and the Air Via management team established, certified and managed Via Airways, a Bulgarian charter passenger airline, currently operating under the Fly2Sky brand. So, startng from the month of October Air Via ceased operations on its own.

== Destinations ==
During the summer months, Air Via operated charter flights between the Bulgarian seaside airports Burgas and Varna and almost all countries in Western Europe and the Middle East. During the winter months, Air Via operated under ACMI contracts in the Middle East and in Asia.

== Fleet ==
Between 2005 and 2016, Air Via operated upto 5 aircraft A320. As of January 2016, the Air VIA fleet consisted of the following aircraft:

Air VIA fleet
Aircraft	In service	Passengers	Notes
Airbus A320-200	1	180	Wet leased to Enter Air
Airbus A321-200	1	220	

== Incidents and accidents ==
- On 24 May 2013, Air VIA flight 502 from Leipzig to Varna overshot the runway at Varna Airport after touchdown because of tailwind. Two people on board were injured during evacuation.
- On 4 July 2014, in clear weather and calm winds, the Air VIA's A320 flight 501 from Varna to Leipzig failed to land within length of runway 08R and touched down hard short of the runway threshold. The aircraft bounced and touched down for a second time at the very beginning of the runway (in the area of the 'piano keys') in a nose-high attitude resulting in a tailstrike. The landing run was completed normally and the A320 taxied to the main apron without assistance. Nobody was injured. Substantial damage occurred to the aft fuselage.
