= LZR =

LZR may refer to:

- Lzr - a variant of the Stoned computer virus
- LZR (Lempel - Ziv - Renau) - a lossless data compression algorithm
- LZR - the ICAO airline code for the Bulgarian airline Air Lazur
- LZR - the International Air Transport Association airport code for Lizard Island Airport in Australia
- LZR Racer - a high-end Speedo swimsuit
- Led Zeppelin Remasters - a compilation album of remastered material by rock group Led Zeppelin
