= Milas–Bodrum Airport =

Airport in Turkey

Milas–Bodrum Airport Milas-Bodrum Havalimanı

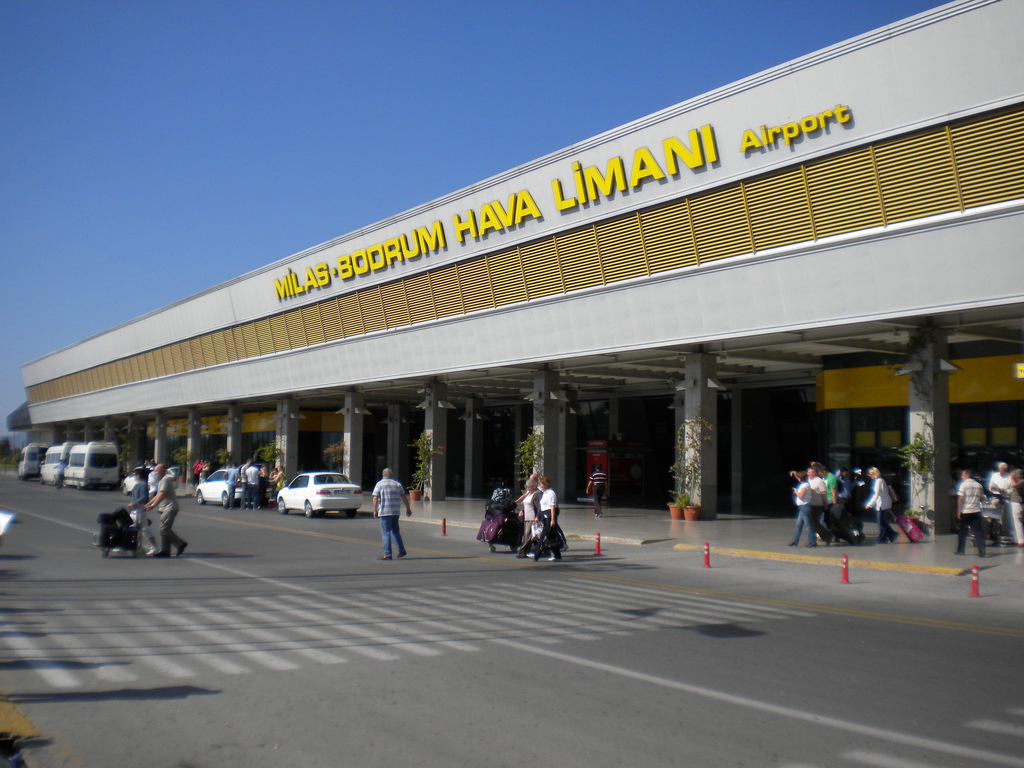
- IATA: BJV; ICAO: LTFE

Summary
- Airport type: Public/military
- Operator: TAV Airports Holding, General Directorate of State Airports Authority
- Serves: Muğla, Turkey
- Location: Milas, Muğla, Turkey
- Opened: 1 April 1997; 29 years ago
- Operating base for: Pegasus Airlines
- Elevation AMSL: 6 m (20 ft)
- Coordinates: 37°15′02″N 27°39′51″E
- Website: www.milas-bodrumairport.com

Map
- Location of airport in Turkey BJV/LTFE (Asia)

Runways
| Direction | Length | | Surface |
| Direction | ft | m | Surface |
|---|---|---|---|
| 10L/28R | 9,842 | 3,000 | Concrete |
| 10R/28L | 8,202 | 2,500 |

Statistics (2025)
- Annual passenger capacity: 7,600,000
- Passengers: 4,357,902
- Passenger change 2024–25: ▲1%
- Aircraft movements: 42,352
- Movements change 2024–25: ▲1%

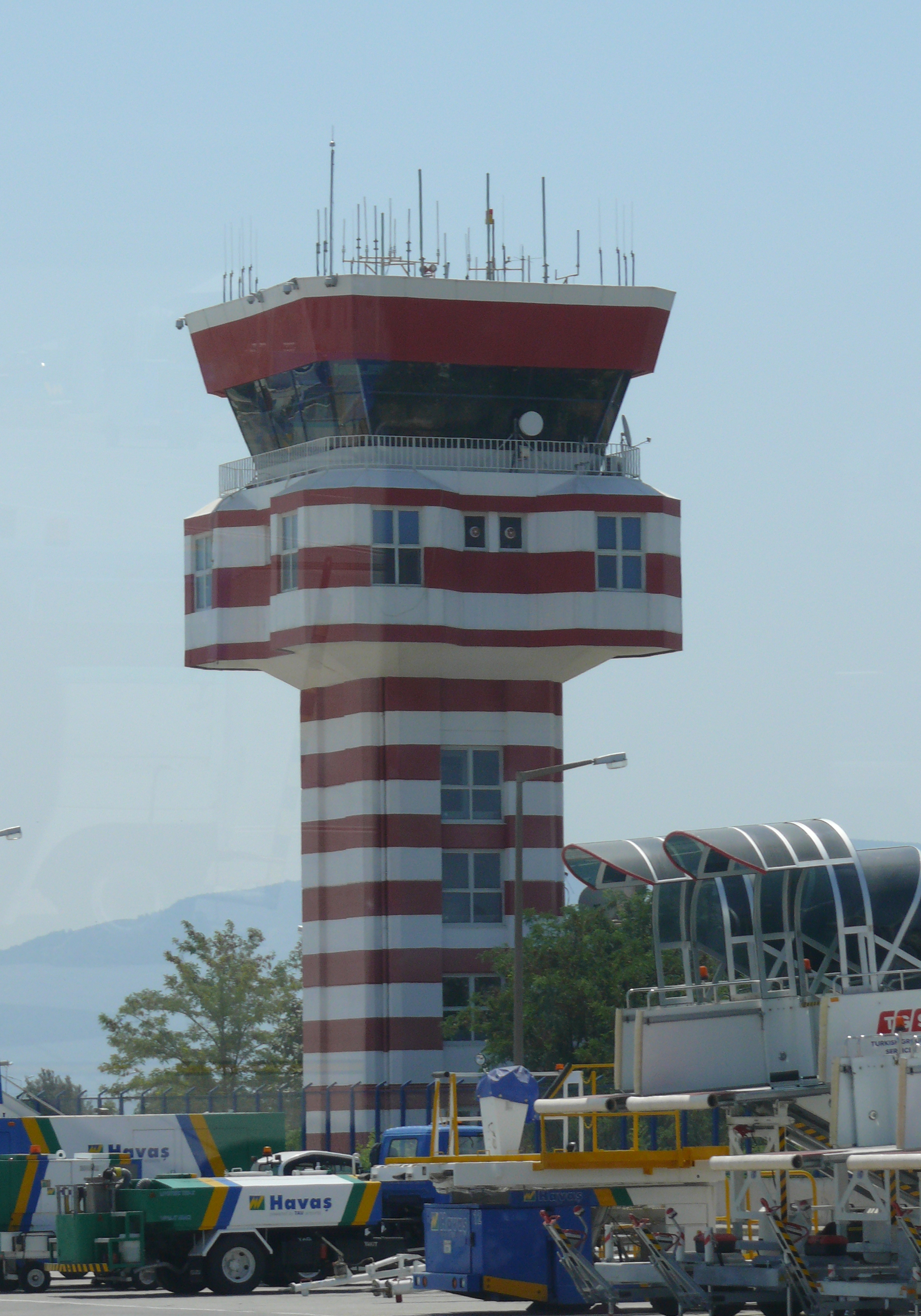
Milas–Bodrum Airport tower

Milas–Bodrum Airport (IATA: BJV, ICAO: LTFE) is an international airport that serves the Turkish towns of Bodrum and Milas. The airport is situated 36 km (22 mi) northeast of the town of Bodrum, and 16 km (9.9 mi) south of Milas.

== Airlines and destinations ==
| Airlines | Destinations |
|---|---|
| Aeroflot | Seasonal: Moscow–Sheremetyevo |
| Air Astana | Seasonal: Almaty, Astana |
| Air Serbia | Seasonal charter: Belgrade |
| AJet | Ankara, Antalya, Istanbul–Sabiha Gökçen; Seasonal: Amman–Queen Alia, Basel, Berlin, Bremen, Bucharest–Otopeni, Copenhagen, Düsseldorf (begins 5 July 2027), Frankfurt (begins 5 July 2027), Hamburg, London–Stansted, Leipzig/Halle, Nuremberg, Prague, Pristina, Sarajevo, Samsun, Skopje, Stockholm–Arlanda, Stuttgart (begins 1 July 2027), Vienna |
| Animawings | Seasonal: Bucharest–Otopeni |
| Azerbaijan Airlines | Seasonal: Baku |
| azimuth | Seasonal: Sochi |
| Belavia | Seasonal charter: Minsk |
| BH Air | Seasonal charter: Sofia |
| British Airways | Seasonal: London–Heathrow |
| Corendon Airlines | Seasonal: Brussels, Cologne/Bonn, Düsseldorf, Nuremberg |
| Corendon Dutch Airlines | Seasonal: Amsterdam |
| easyJet | Seasonal: Bristol, Liverpool, London–Gatwick, London–Luton, Manchester |
| Edelweiss Air | Seasonal: Zürich |
| Enter Air | Seasonal charter: Gdańsk, Katowice, Poznań, Warsaw–Chopin, Wrocław |
| European Air Charter | Seasonal charter: Plovdiv, Sofia, Varna |
| FlyKhiva | Seasonal charter: Tashkent |
| Fly Lili | Seasonal charter: Bucharest–Băneasa |
| Flyadeal | Seasonal: Riyadh |
| Flydubai | Seasonal: Dubai–International |
| Fly Kıbrıs Airlines | Seasonal: Ercan |
| Flynas | Seasonal: Jeddah, Riyadh |
| FlyOne | Seasonal charter: Chișinău |
| Freebird Airlines | Seasonal charter: Billund, Brussels, Copenhagen, Weeze |
| GetJet Airlines | Seasonal charter: Vilnius |
| Gulf Air | Bahrain |
| GullivAir | Seasonal charter: Sofia |
| Jazeera Airways | Seasonal: Kuwait City |
| Jet2.com | Seasonal: Birmingham, Bristol, East Midlands, Edinburgh, Glasgow, Leeds/Bradford, Liverpool, London–Stansted, Manchester, Newcastle upon Tyne |
| Kuwait Airways | Seasonal: Kuwait City |
| LOT Polish Airlines | Seasonal charter: Gdańsk, Katowice, Poznań, Warsaw–Chopin, Wrocław |
| Norwegian Air Shuttle | Seasonal: Oslo |
| Pegasus Airlines | Adana/Mersin, Ankara, Istanbul–Sabiha Gökçen; Seasonal: Beirut, Cologne/Bonn, Nuremberg |
| Qatar Airways | Seasonal: Doha |
| Red Wings Airlines | Seasonal: Mineralnye Vody |
| Rossiya Airlines | Sochi |
| Ryanair | Dublin, London–Stansted |
| Southwind Airlines | Seasonal charter: Moscow-Sheremetyevo |
| Smartwings | Seasonal: Budapest, Prague |
| Smartwings Poland | Seasonal charter: Gdansk, Katowice, Lodz, Poznań, Rzeszow, Warsaw–Chopin, Wrocław |
| SunExpress | Seasonal: Berlin, Cologne/Bonn, Düsseldorf, Frankfurt, Hannover, İzmir, Manchester, Munich, Stuttgart, Tirana |
| TAROM | Seasonal charter: Bucharest–Otopeni |
| Transavia | Seasonal: Paris–Orly |
| TUI fly Belgium | Seasonal: Brussels |
| TUI fly Netherlands | Seasonal: Amsterdam |
| Turkish Airlines | Istanbul; Seasonal: Berlin, Kuwait City, Munich; Seasonal charter: Moscow-Vnukovo, Saint Petersburg |

== Traffic statistics ==
Milas–Bodrum Airport passenger traffic statistics
| Year (months) | Domestic | % change | International | % change | Total | % change |
|---|---|---|---|---|---|---|
| 2025 | 2,540,757 | ▲6% | 1,817,145 | ▼6% | 4,357,902 | ▲1% |
| 2024 | 2,392,787 | ▲5% | 1,930,950 | ▲9% | 4,323,737 | ▲7% |
| 2023 | 2,274,819 | ▲11% | 1,778,535 | ▼4% | 4,053,354 | ▲4% |
| 2022 | 2,045,632 | ▲7 | 1,852,895 | ▲85% | 3,898,527 | ▲34% |
| 2021 | 1,908,796 | ▲89% | 1,000,541 | ▲113% | 2,909,337 | ▲97% |
| 2020 | 1,010,734 | ▼59% | 469,605 | ▼75% | 1,480,339 | ▼66% |
| 2019 | 2,464,398 | ▼8% | 1,873,335 | ▲24% | 4,337,733 | ▲4% |
| 2018 | 2,670,185 | ▲4% | 1,505,927 | ▲63% | 4,172,112 | ▲19% |
| 2017 | 2,576,262 | ▲11% | 925,268 | ▲2% | 3,501,530 | ▲9% |
| 2016 | 2,312,042 | ▲0% | 909,734 | ▼42% | 3,221,776 | ▼17% |
| 2015 | 2,309,115 | ▲15% | 1,568,758 | ▼15% | 3,877,873 | ▲1% |
| 2014 | 2,011,444 | ▲16% | 1,835,103 | ▼3% | 3,846,547 | ▲6% |
| 2013 | 1,738,027 | ▲8% | 1,890,293 | ▼1% | 3,628,320 | ▲3% |
| 2012 | 1,614,314 | ▲16% | 1,916,146 | ▼4% | 3,530,460 | ▲4% |
| 2011 | 1,396,493 | ▲20% | 1,991,842 | ▲4% | 3,388,335 | ▲10% |
| 2010 | 1,166,018 | ▲20% | 1,919,169 | ▲6% | 3,085,187 | ▲11% |
| 2009 | 970,337 | ▲15% | 1,810,607 | ▼5% | 2,780,944 | ▲1% |
| 2008 | 846,068 | ▲3% | 1,903,720 | ▲9% | 2,749,788 | ▲7% |
| 2007 | 825,510 | ▲4% | 1,752,590 | ▲8% | 2,578,100 | ▲9% |
| 2006 | 797,410 | ▲39% | 1,578,068 | ▼11% | 2,375,478 | ▼5% |
| 2005 | 572,209 | ▲48% | 1,922,119 | ▲17% | 2,494,328 | ▲22% |
| 2004 | 385,365 | ▲39% | 1,641,259 | ▲24% | 2,036,624 | ▲27% |
| 2003 | 277,819 | ▲3% | 1,321,749 | ▼2% | 1,599,568 | ▼1% |
| 2002 | 269,008 | ▲8% | 1,350,505 | ▲30% | 1,619,513 | ▲26% |
| 2001 | 248,264 | ▼9% | 1,038,039 | ▲24% | 1,286,303 | ▲16% |
| 2000 | 272,525 | Steady | 835,444 | Steady | 1,107,969 | Steady |

== See also ==
- Dalaman Airport, the other international airport in Muğla
- List of airports in Turkey
