= Katowice Airport =

Katowice Wojciech Korfanty Airport Katowice Airport im. Wojciecha Korfantego

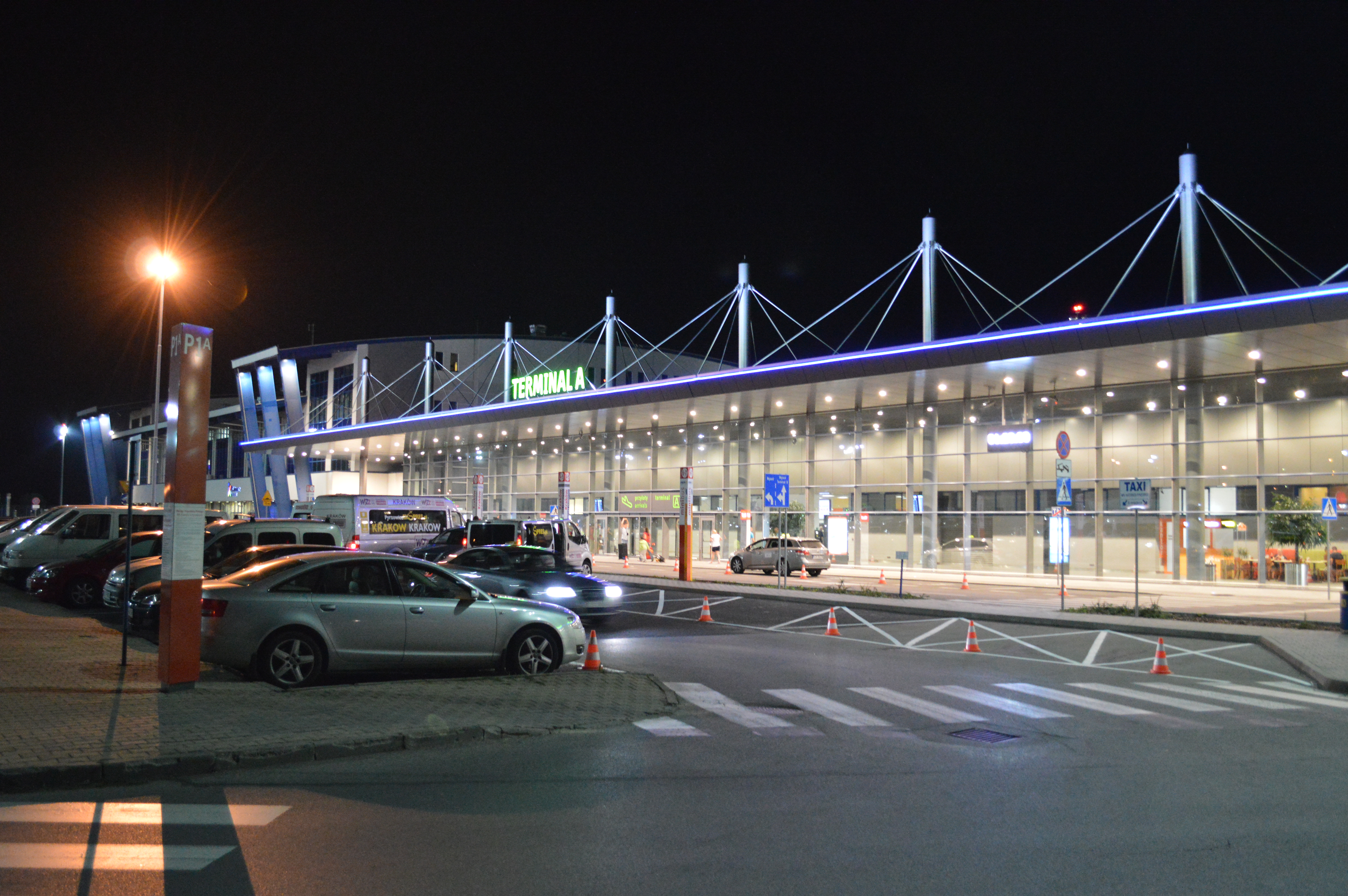
- IATA: KTW; ICAO: EPKT

Summary
- Airport type: Public
- Operator: GTL Górnośląskie Towarzystwo Lotnicze (Upper Silesian Aviation Group)
- Serves: Katowice; Metropolis GZM; Katowice-Ostrava metropolitan area
- Location: Pyrzowice, Poland
- Focus city for: ASL Airlines Ireland; Buzz; Electra Airways; Enter Air; LOT Polish Airlines; Lufthansa Cargo; Ryanair; Skyline Express; Smartwings Poland; Wizz Air
- Elevation AMSL: 304 m (997 ft)
- Coordinates: 50°28′27″N 019°04′48″E
- Website: www.katowice-airport.com

Map
- Location of airport in Silesian Voivodeship KTW (Poland)

Runways
Direction	Length		Surface
Direction	m	ft	Surface
08/26	3,200	10,499	Concrete

Statistics (2025)
- Number of passengers: 7,299,085
- Passenger change 24-25: 14,3% ▲
- Aircraft movements: 53,918
- Movements change 24-25: 11,2% ▲
- Cargo (tonnes): 46,448
- Cargo change 24-25: 24,9% ▲
- Sources: Polish AIP at EUROCONTROL; Statistics from Office of Civil Aviation

Katowice Wojciech Korfanty Airport (Polish: Katowice Airport im. Wojciecha Korfantego) (IATA: KTW, ICAO: EPKT) is an international airport, located in Pyrzowice, 30 km (19 mi) north of Katowice, Poland. The airport is named after Wojciech Korfanty, a politician of the early years of Polish independence. It is the fourth-busiest airport in Poland by passenger volumes, with just shy of 7.3 million passengers in 2025. It is also the second-busiest airport in the country by cargo volume and the largest origin of charter flights in Poland.

== History ==
=== Early years ===
The current location of Katowice Airport was initially used by the German air force. In the early 1940, the Luftwaffe began construction of an airbase in the meadows around Pyrzowice. One medium hangar, and three stone and concrete airstrips were built, with the runway lengths varying between 1,000 and 1,500 meters, and around 50 meters wide. The airbase was used for handling of military aircraft flying from the inner part of the German Reich, carrying supplies to troops on the Eastern Front.In the final phase of World War II, the Messerschmitt Me 163 Komet rocket-powered aircraft were tested here. Following General Ernst Udet's (a Luftwaffe flying ace) death in 1941, the airfield was named Udetfeld

After the Red Army's advance in early 1945, the Soviet air forces gained the control of the airfield. In 1948, the Soviets handed the airbase over to the Polish Air Force. It was then used by the 39th Fighter Regiment, created on 17 April 1951.

A new runway was built in 1964. Soon after, the first-ever regular passenger traffic started, with a LOT Polish Airlines place taking off for Warsaw on 6 October 1966. By the end of 1969, a small passenger terminal was built (550 m^{2} (5,900 sq ft)), together with a taxiway and an apron.

This runway has since been replaced by a new adjacent one (3,200 m (10,500 ft)), completed in May 2015.

=== Development since the 1990s ===
In 1991, Górnośląskie Towarzystwo Lotnicze (The Upper Silesian Aviation Group) was established and in 1994, it became the operator of Pyrzowice Airport. International service from Pyrzowice commenced on 27 March 1993, when Lufthansa started its daily service to Frankfurt Airport.

Poland's admission to the European Union has supercharged airport's growth. The Hungarian low-cost airline Wizz Air chose Katowice for its first base, with their inaugural flight taking off for London Luton. Other low-cost airlines, as well as charter airlines, followed. In 2007, a second terminal (Terminal B) for Schengen flights opened, and in 2015 an arrivals-only Terminal C was completed. Also in 2015, a new runway, which is the second-longest runway in Poland at 3,200 metres (10,500 ft), was completed.

Future plans include the construction of a completely new passenger terminal, a further expansion of the recently built cargo terminal, and a new railway connection.

== Facilities ==
=== Terminals ===
There are three passenger terminals: A (non-Schengen departures), B (Schengen departures), and C (all arrivals), as well as a cargo terminal. Terminal B has been completed in 2007 and underwent a major expansion in 2019–21. Altogether, terminals at Katowice Airport are capable of handling about 8.0 million passengers annually.

In 2024, the airport's owner announced plans for another airport expansion which would allow Katowice Airport to handle up to 12 million passengers per year and double cargo volumes by 2028.

=== Runway and apron ===
The airport's concrete runway is 3200m by 45m, oriented 8 and 26, and can accommodate aircraft as large as Boeing 747 or Boeing 777, albeit not at MTOW. Heavy transports such as Antonov An-124 or An-225 have been noted to land there on occasions. The airport uses new generation Instrument Landing System, a Thales 420 system. The runway at Katowice Airport is the second longest runway in Poland, behind Warsaw Chopin's runway 15/33. 33 new aircraft stands are under construction as of now. They will be located between taxiways E (Echo) and H (Hotel), to the west from main apron, between main and cargo apron and to the east from cargo apron.

The airport has two plane spotter stands, one at the western end of the airport's runway. The platforms are free to access.

=== Air traffic control tower ===
The new ATC tower has been already built. It is the tallest ATC in Poland and in Eastern Europe, at 46 meters height.

=== Aircraft maintenance facilities ===
Wizz Air, which has a base at the airport, is the primary operator of two maintenance buildings at Katowice Airport and services their Airbus A321neo fleet there. Linetech, an aircraft maintenance contractor, operates two other buildings and services Embraer E190 jets.

=== Other facilities ===
The airport owns three parking lots with 4,348 parking spaces in total. Parking lots P1 and P2 (948 spaces) are located right next to the terminal and focused on shorter-term parking while parking lot P3 is located further away and dedicated to long-term parking. A free shuttle runs from parking lot P3 to the terminals. There are also multiple other, privately owned parking lots near the airport. In 2023, a train station with limited train service has been opened.

There is also a Moxy Hotel, a brand by Marriott International, located right next to the main parking entrance (P1).

== Airlines and destinations ==
=== Passenger ===
The following airlines operate regular scheduled and charter flights to and from Katowice:

Airlines	Destinations
Air 001	Seasonal charter: Antalya, Djerba, Heraklion, Hurghada
Air Anka	Seasonal charter: Antalya
Air Arabia	Sharjah (begins 17 December 2026)
Air Baltic	Seasonal: Gran Canaria (begins 26 October 2026)
Buzz	Seasonal charter: Antalya, Bodrum, Burgas, Chania, Corfu, Fuerteventura, Heraklion, Kefalonia, Kos, Larnaca, Lisbon, Menorca, Palma de Mallorca, Tirana, Zakynthos
Enter Air	Fuerteventura; Seasonal: Kos, Tirana, Zakynthos; Seasonal charter: Antalya, Boa Vista, Bodrum, Burgas, Chania, Colombo–Bandaranaike, Corfu, Djerba, Dubai–Al Maktoum, Dubrovnik, Enfidha, Funchal, Girona, Gran Canaria, Heraklion, Hurghada, Kos, Marsa Alam, Mombasa, Muscat, Mytilene, Podgorica, Rhodes, Sal, Sharm El Sheikh Tenerife–South, Tirana, Varna, Zanzibar
Freebird Airlines	Seasonal charter: Antalya
LOT Polish Airlines	Warsaw–Chopin; Seasonal charter: Agadir, Antalya, Bangkok–Suvarnabhumi, Bodrum, Cancún, Faro, Girona, Heraklion, Hurghada, Izmir, Malé, Marsa Alam, Palma de Mallorca, Paphos, Phuket, Phu Quoc, Puerto Plata, Sharm El Sheikh, Tirana, Varadero, Varna, Zakynthos
Mavi Gök Airlines	Seasonal charter: Antalya, Hurghada
Nesma Airlines	Seasonal charter: Hurghada
Nouvelair	Seasonal charter: Djerba, Monastir
Pegasus Airlines	Seasonal charter: Antalya
Plus Ultra	Seasonal charter: Porlamar, Varadero
Ryanair	Alicante, Athens, Bari, Budapest, Charleroi, Dublin, Dubrovnik, London–Stansted, Málaga, Malta, Manchester, Milan–Bergamo, Naples (begins 1 December 2026), Oslo, Paphos, Reggio Calabria, Rome–Fiumicino, Tirana, Treviso; Seasonal: Aarhus, Alghero, Catania, Chania, Corfu, Lamezia Terme, Pula, Trapani, Turin (begins 19 December 2026), Varna, Zadar
Sky Express	Seasonal charter: Athens
Skyline Express	Seasonal charter: Burgas, Heraklion, Hurghada, Marsa Alam, Sharm El Sheikh, Varna
SkyUp Airlines	Seasonal charter: Antalya, Bahrain, Hurghada, Sharm El Sheikh, Hambantota–Mattala
Smartwings	Seasonal: Dubrovnik; Seasonal charter: Antalya, Djerba, Palermo, Taba, Tirana,
SunExpress	Antalya; Seasonal: Izmir
Tailwind Airlines	Seasonal charter: Antalya
Wizz Air	Abu Dhabi, Agadir, Alicante, Athens, Barcelona, Billund, Catania, Dortmund, Eindhoven, Fuerteventura, Funchal, Hurghada, Kutaisi, Larnaca, London–Luton, Madrid, Malta, Marsa Alam, Naples, Ohrid, Porto, Reykjavík–Keflavík, Rome–Fiumicino, Sharm El Sheikh, Tenerife–South; Seasonal: Brașov, Brindisi, Burgas, Comiso, Corfu, Dubrovnik, Faro, Lamezia Terme, Maastricht/Aachen, Málaga, Palma de Mallorca, Podgorica, Rijeka, Rimini, Split, Tirana, Turin (begins 16 January 2027), Varna, Zakynthos

=== Cargo ===
Airlines	Destinations
ASL Airlines Belgium	Gdańsk, Liège, Riga
ASL Airlines Ireland	Cologne/Bonn, Hannover, Leipzig/Halle, Milan–Malpensa, Paris–Charles de Gaulle, Stuttgart
Bluebird Nordic	Cagliari, Leipzig/Halle, Liège, Milan–Malpensa, Paris–Charles de Gaulle, Timișoara, Warsaw–Chopin
Cargoair	Leipzig/Halle, Liège, Venice
Central Airlines	Chengdu
DHL Aviation	Leipzig/Halle
Farnair Europe	Cologne/Bonn
FedEx Express	Timișoara, Warsaw–Chopin
Lufthansa Cargo	Frankfurt, Košice, Ostrava, Vienna
Qatar Airways Cargo	Doha
Suparna Airlines	Nanjing
UPS Airlines	Cologne/Bonn
West Atlantic	Cologne/Bonn, Leipzig/Halle, Oslo

== Statistics ==
=== Busiest routes ===
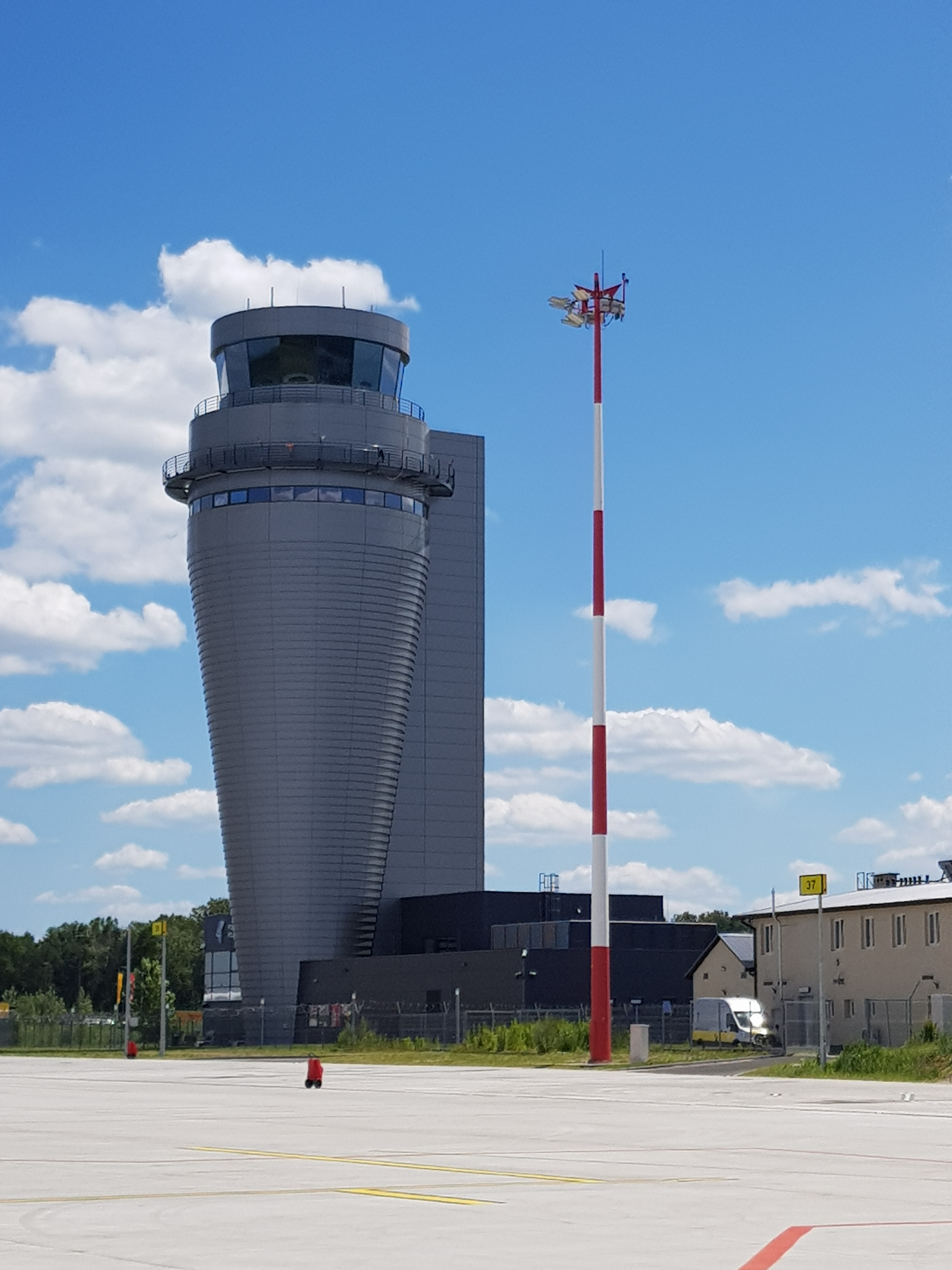
Control tower

Busiest routes from Katowice Airport (2024)
Rank	Airport	Passengers	Change 2023 / 24
1.	Antalya (AYT)	641,982	▲10,2%
2.	Dortmund (DTM)	435,815	▲12,0%
3.	Hurghada (HRG)	362,670	▲28,1%
4.	Marsa Alam (RMF)	270,822	▲40,3%
5.	London-Luton (LTN)	243,011	▼0,8%
6.	London-Stansted (STN)	198,745	▲6,7%
7.	Djerba (DJE)	138,673	▲50,3%
8.	Catania (CTA)	136,775	▲96,6%
9.	Frankfurt (FRA)	122,913	▲6,6%
10.	Warsaw-Chopin (WAW)	121,161	▲4,1%
11.	Eindhoven (EIN)	120,407	0,0%
12.	Larnaca (LCA)	118,982	▲20,6%
13.	Athens (ATH)	118,333	▲11,0%
14.	Sharm El Sheikh (SSH)	115,050	▲53,4%
15.	Heraklion (HER)	111,865	▲19,6%
16.	Tenerife-South (TFS)	110,815	▲37,3%
17.	Barcelona–El Prat (BCN)	106,530	▲28,9%
18.	Malta (MLA)	103,376	▲96,8%
19.	Bergamo (BGY)	102,499	▲43,9%
20.	Rhodes (RHO)	100,609	▲3,4%

=== Passenger figures ===
Year	Passengers	Air operations	Cargo (tonnes)
1996	▲68,203	▲3,586	▲596
1997	▲101,054	▲4,290	▲1,241
1998	▲150,724	▲6,256	▲1,365
1999	▲170,230	▲6,510	▲1,522
2000	▼168,126	▲8,710	▲7,745
2001	▲180,015	▲9,441	▼2,196
2002	▲202,267	▼8,389	▲2,886
2003	▲257,991	▲9,375	▲3,548
2004	▲622,612	▲13,803	▲5,038
2005	▲1,092,358	▲16,222	▲5,636
2006	▲1,458,411	▲21,014	▲6,113
2007	▲1,995,914	▲24,489	▲7,795
2008	▲2,426,942	▲27,030	▲12,703
2009	▼2,364,613	▼26,206	▼6,543
2010	▲2,403,253	▲26,770	▲11,195
2011	▲2,544,124	▲29,259	▲12,138
2012	▲2,550,848	▲30,584	▼10,546
2013	▲2,554,198	▼28,990	▲10,877
2014	▲2,695,732	▼28,771	▲16,269
2015	▲3,069,279	▲31,727	▼16,119
2016	▲3,221,261	▼31,013	▲17,674
2017	▲3,892,941	▲34,725	▲17,779
2018	▲4,838,149	▲41,007	▲18,547
2019	▲4,843,889	▲41,606	▲20,121
2020	▼1,445,781	▼21,922	▲20,369
2021	▲2,328,973	▲28,856	▲32,104
2022	▲4,419,090	▲40,123	▲40,642
2023	▲5,609,022	▲45,167	▼35,926
2024	▲6,386,145	▲48,505	▲37,175
2025	▲7,299,085	▲53,918	▲46,448

== Ground transportation ==
=== By car ===
Katowice Airport is located on regional road 913, 40 km (24 mi) north of downtown Katowice, with access through national road 86. It is near the junction of A1 motorway and S1 expressway that provide direct access to other major cities such as Częstochowa, Gliwice, Rybnik and Bielsko-Biała.

Short term parking is available directly in front of the terminals while long term parking lots are located alongside the regional road 913. The airport offers 3,922 parking spaces. Additional parking is available on private lots not associated with the airport. The airport is also served by taxis, Uber and iTaxi. There is also premium parking at Katowice International Airport.

Car rentals from all major rental companies as well as local ones are available.

=== By bus ===
- MetropoliaZTM operates few lines to the airport.
  - AP line is an express line that goes directly to downtown Katowice. It operates at every half an hour with an exception between midnight and 3am when it operates once per hour.
  - M11 also operates to Katowice but with stops in Sączów, Wojkowice, and Siemianowice Śląskie.
  - M14 operates to Gliwice via Tarnowskie Góry.
  - M19 operates to Sosnowiec via Będzin.
  - M116/M16 operate to Gliwice via Piekary Śląskie, Bytom and Zabrze.
- Flixbus connects Katowice International Airport with Katowice, Kraków, Częstochowa, Chorzów, and Bytom.
- Matuszek bus corporation connects Katowice Airport with Katowice city centre and Kraków city centre.
- P-Air PyrzowiceEkspres.pl (official WizzAir's carrier) connects the airport with Kraków and Częstochowa.
- Leo Express connects the airport with Ostrava, Rybnik, Gliwice and Bohumín direct from the airport.
- Bus connections from other largest cities of the region, such as Kraków, Częstochowa and minibus - inter alia from/to Opole, Wrocław are also available. Local buses connect to the city of Bytom where one can change for bus to Katowice.

Bus stops are next to Terminal C and Terminal B. They are about 10 metres from the terminal entrance.

=== By rail ===
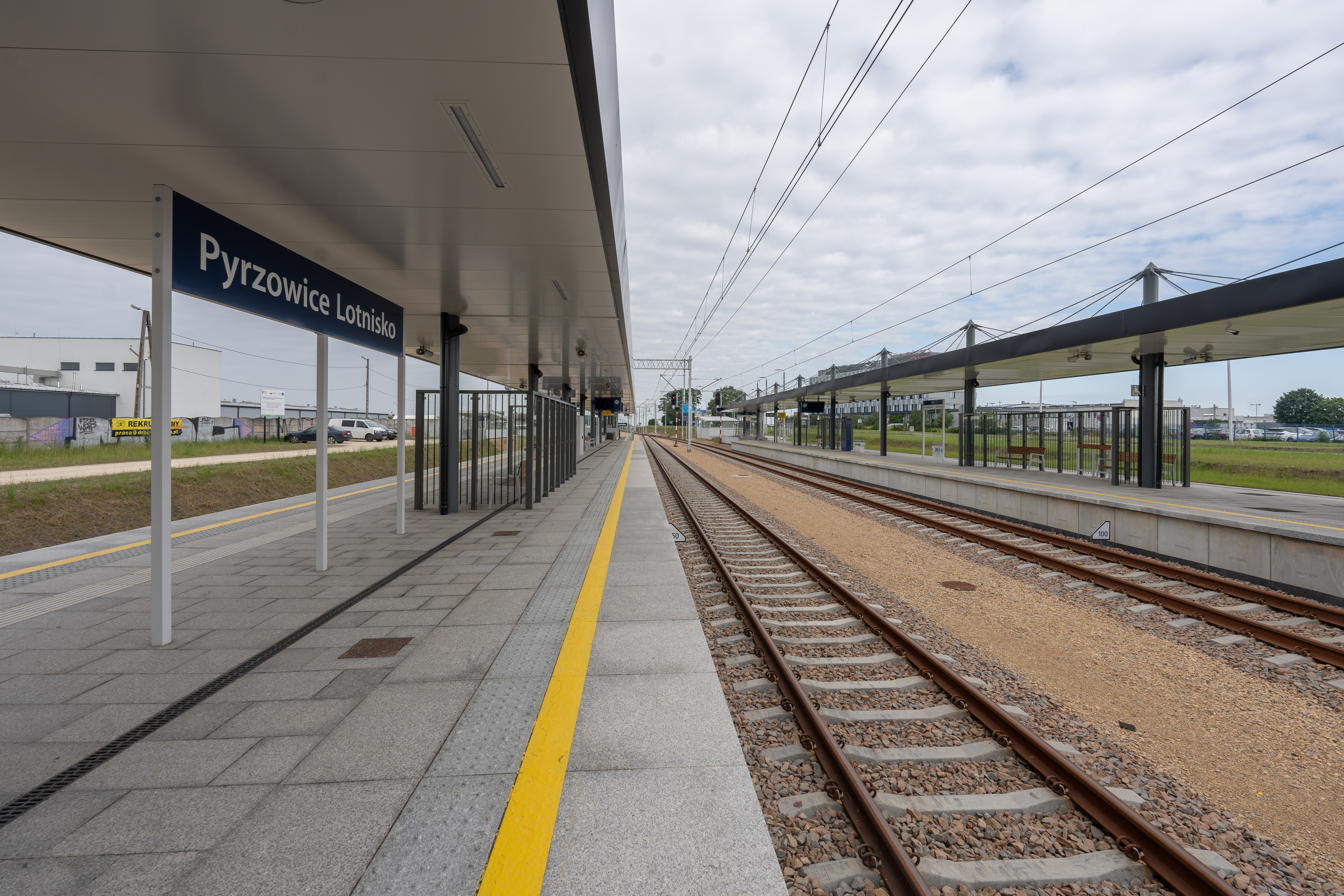
Pyrzowice Airport railway stop

In December 2023 the airport gained a rail link to Tarnowskie Góry and Zawiercie, which allows direct trains running from the airport to Katowice. The stop for the airport terminal is called ”Pyrzowice Lotnisko” and is located approximately 500 metres from passenger terminals, to which leads an asphalt pavement. The station is covered with a roof and adapted to the needs of persons with disabilities.

As of January 2026, the station is served by Silesian Railways (line S9, Częstochowa - Chorzów Batory), PKP Intercity (Lublin - Katowice), and RegioJet (Warsaw - Ostrava - Prague).

The airport rail yard will also include the railway track connecting Katowice Airport with the CMK High Speed Main Line via line no. 182 Zawiercie - Tarnowskie Góry. This project has received funding from the European Union. According to the schedule, the finished infrastructure will be put into service no later than June 2026.

== See also ==
- Katowice-Muchowiec Airfield
- Silesian Voivodeship
- Katowice urban area
- List of airports in Poland
