= Katowice-Muchowiec Airfield =

Katowice-Muchowiec Airfield Lotnisko Katowice-Muchowiec
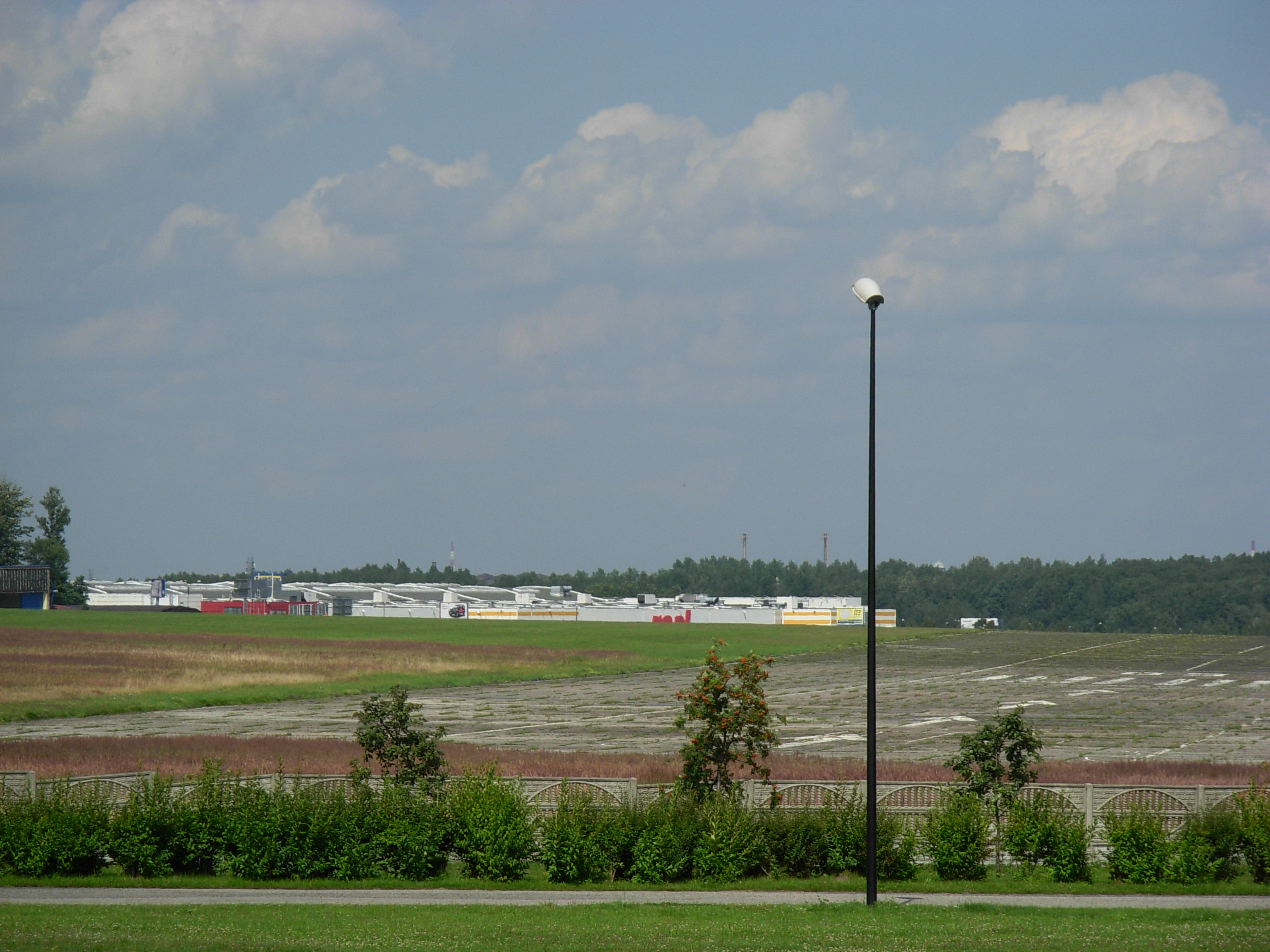
- IATA: none; ICAO: EPKM

Summary
- Airport type: Sport/Public
- Operator: Katowice City Council
- Location: Katowice
- Elevation AMSL: 928 ft (283 m)
- Coordinates: 50°14′17.88″N 19°02′02.34″E
- Interactive map of Katowice-Muchowiec Airfield

Runways
Direction	Length		Surface
Direction	ft	m	Surface
05L/23R	3,511	1,070	Concrete
07/25	1,575	480	Grass (closed)
05R/23L	1,969	600	Grass
- Sources: airfield website

Katowice-Muchowiec Airfield (Polish: Lotnisko Katowice-Muchowiec, ICAO code: EPKM) is a general aviation aerodrome in the Muchowiec neighbourhood of Katowice, Poland.

The airfield consists of one concrete runway, RWY 05L/23R with the dimensions of 1,070 by 30 metres (3,510 by 98 feet), along with the parallel 600 by 60 metres (1,970 by 200 feet) grass RWY 05R/23L and the 480 by 80 metres (1,570 by 260 feet) grass RWY 07/25, with RWY 07/25 being closed until October 2, 2026 per NOTAM.

== History ==
Construction of an aerodrome in the Muchowiec district commenced in 1926. Civilian flights by LOT Polish Airlines commenced in 1929.Destinations served included Warsaw, Kraków and Vienna.

Ground damage due to coal-mining activity closed the airport to passenger traffic in 1958, and now only the sport use remains with infrequent general aviation arrivals and departures.

On the other hand, because of the long commute from the city centre to the 30 km distant Katowice International Airport, it has been proposed to the Katowice government in 2005 that a city airport be built at Katowice-Muchowiec Airport, offloading Katowice International for general aviation as well as some smaller scheduled traffic, serving primarily the business community and STOL aircraft.

== Modernisation proposals ==
Katowice (321 thousand inhabitants, 4,5 million in nearby GOP conurbation) intended to transform its inner-city airport (runway length: 1110 metres, width: 30 metres) into a proper City-Airport (there is limited space for the enlargement of the landing strip to approx. 1500 metres) that would serve this densely populated coal basin. However, only smaller aircraft could use it, and it would serve rather domestic and business traffic.

It was recently decided that building a new concrete runway parallel to ul. Lotnisko (Lotnisko Street) with dimensions 850 x 25 metres is the best course of action. Further modernization would require also building new facilities, including a passenger terminal. It is unclear how the proposed improvements are to be squared with the conditions which forced the cessation of passenger traffic in the first place. As of summer 2007, work on fixing the aerodrome has stalled because of a court fight between its resident sport airclubs (aeroclubs) over the airfield's real estate (nominally owned by the city, but handed over to the airclubs in perpetual lease).
