= Sarafovo =

Neighbourhood of Burgas, Bulgaria

Coordinates: 42°34′N 27°31′E

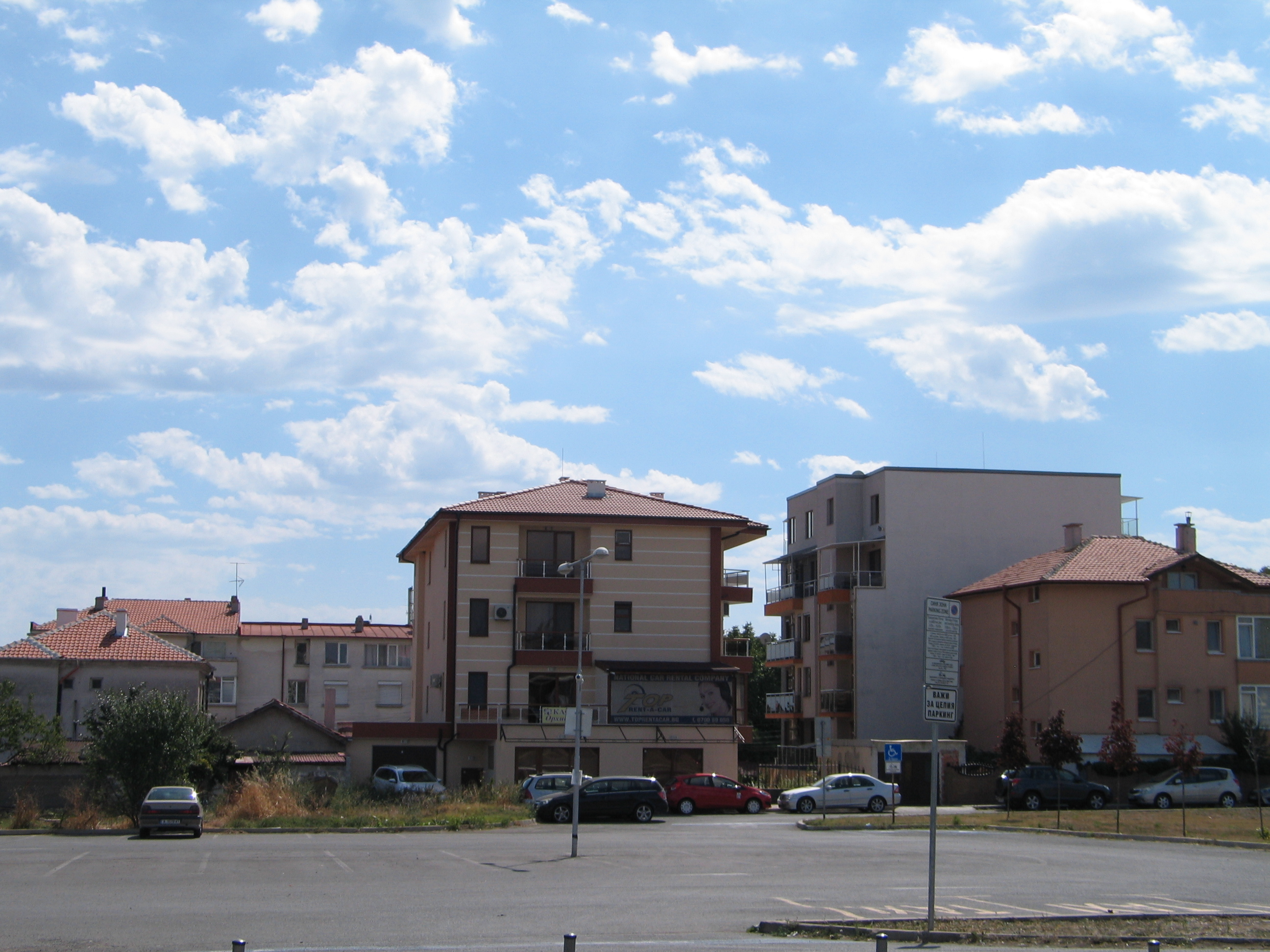
Burgas, a Sarafovo quarter

Sarafovo (Bulgarian: Сарафово) is a neighbourhood of Burgas, largest city in southeast Bulgaria – a regional, tourist and trade center.

Sarafovo was founded as a settlement (1912–1922) by refugees from the Thrace region.

== Geography ==
Sarafovo is 10 km from the centre of Burgas. There are over 4,000 residents in more than 1,300 houses.

It is situated on a hill on the Black Sea coast, where there is a fine view of the whole of Burgas bay, Pomorie, Sozopol, Burgas and the mountain heights of the Strandzha Mountain. Sarafovo also has a wide, sandy beach.

== Tourism ==
The number of hotels and places of amusement increases every season. The area is particularly popular with Irish and Norwegian tourists. Tourism is the main economic activity in Sarafovo, but unlike some larger resorts, Sarafovo does not close down at the end of the main holiday season. Tourism peaks in July and August, when the population increases to 10,000–12,000 people.

A further strong impetus to visitor numbers is Burgas International Airport, which is less than 1 km away from Sarafovo. In 2019 the airport processed more than 3,2 millions passengers. Sarafovo is convenient to Burgas city centre (10 km), the seaside town of Pomorie (7 km), Nessebar and the beach resort of Sunny Beach (25 km).

Sarafovo also has an increasing number of foreign residents, who have chosen Bulgaria for their home. There is also a yacht port. Overall, Sarafovo's ambition is to become "The European face of Burgas".
