= Saints Constantine and Helena, Bulgaria =

Saints Constantine and Helena Св. св. Константин и Елена
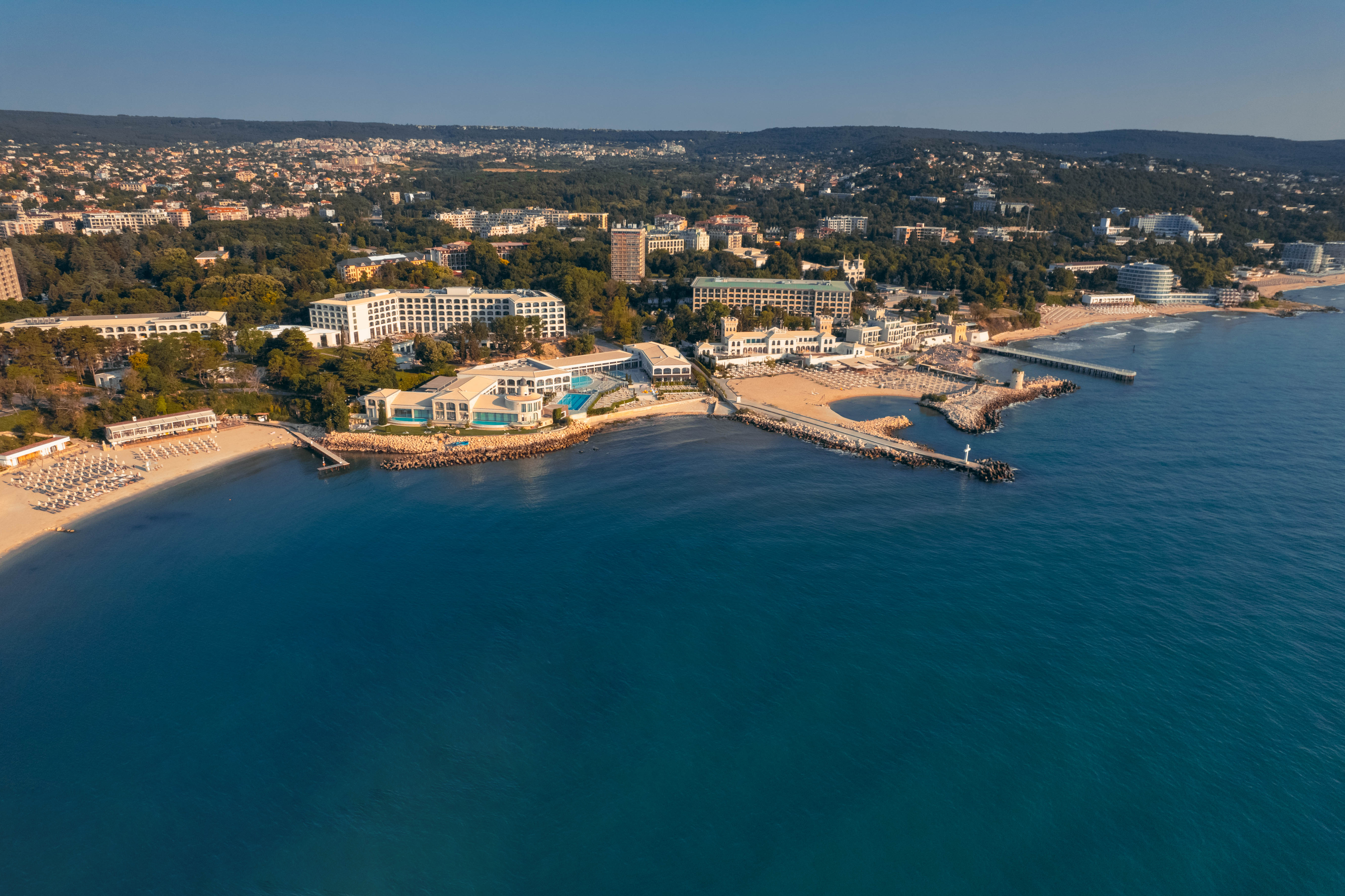
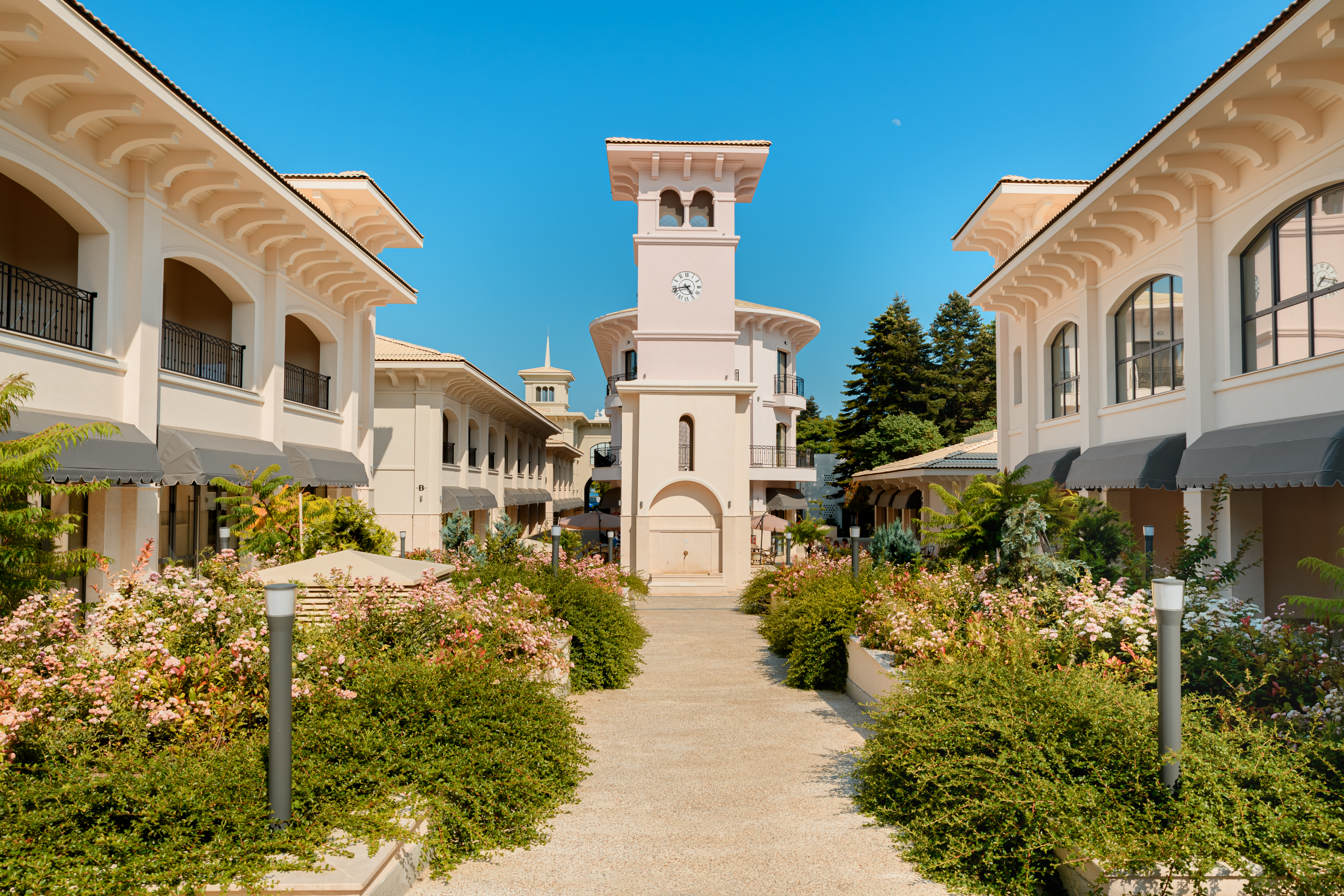
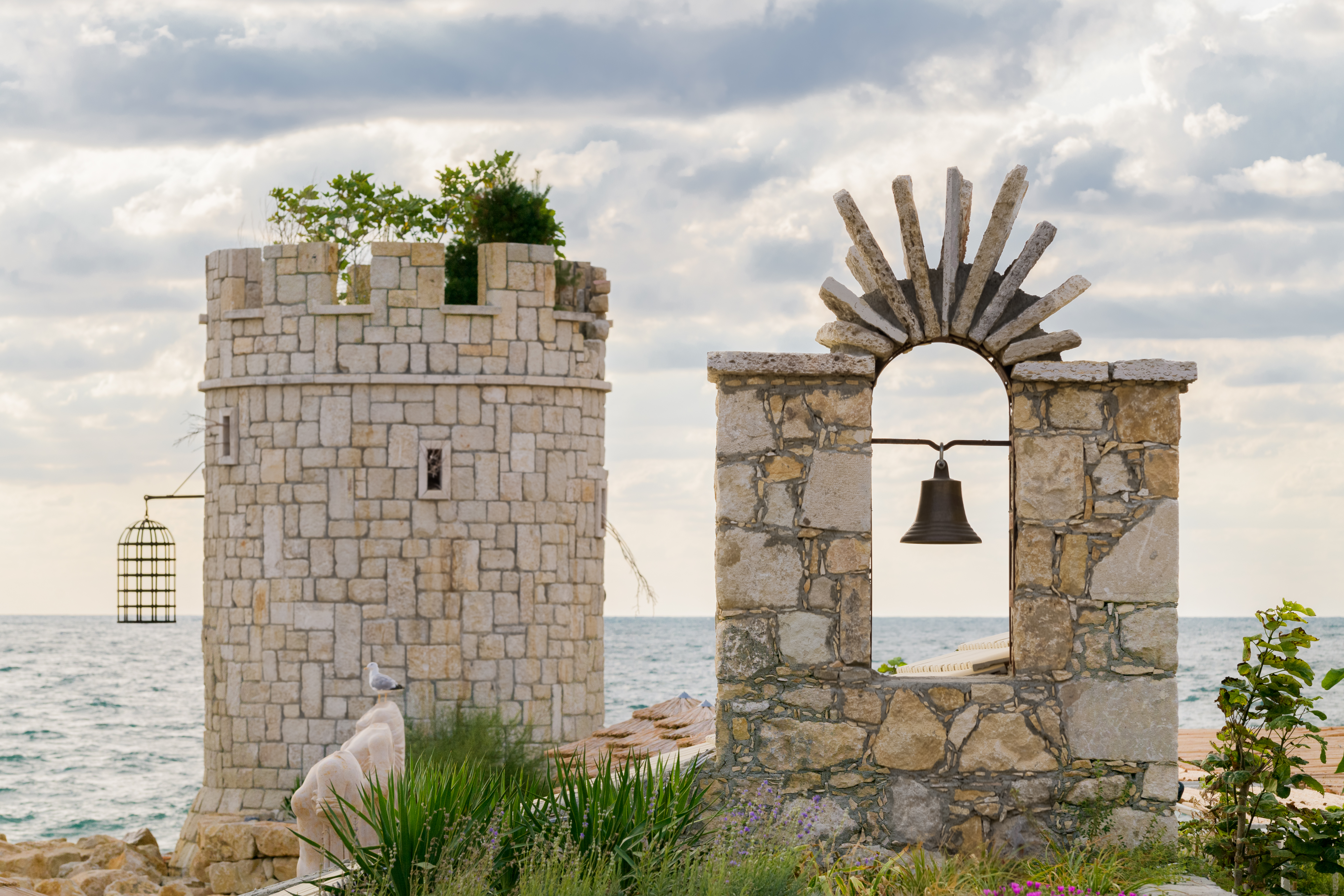
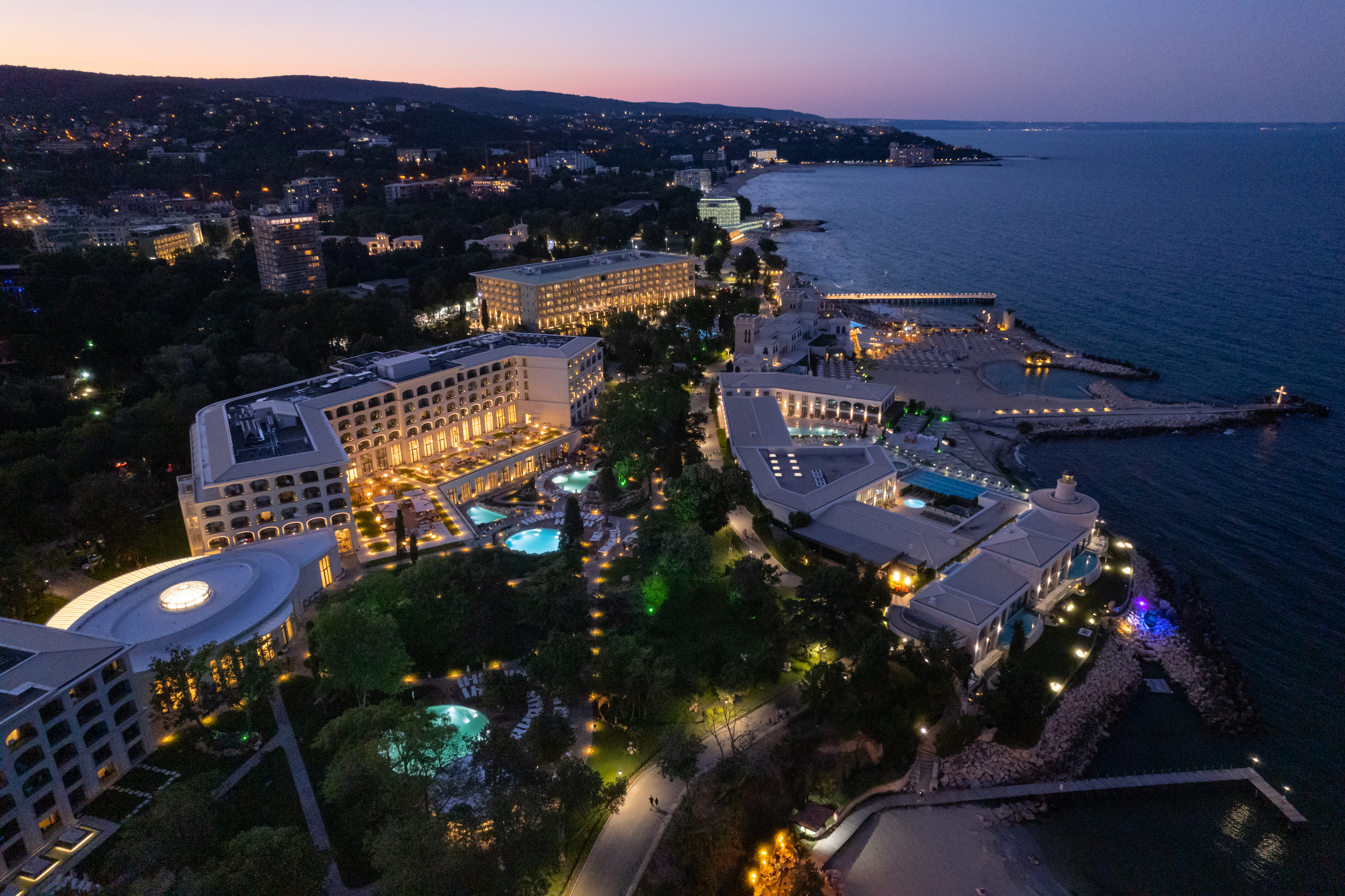
- Location of Saints Constantine and Helena
- Coordinates: 43°13′45″N 28°0′30″E
- Country: Bulgaria
- Provinces (Oblast): Varna
- Elevation: 0 m (0 ft)

Population
  - Total: 20,878
- Time zone: UTC+2 (EET)
  - Summer (DST): UTC+3 (EEST)
- Postal Code: 9006
- Area code: 052
- Website: https://en.visitstconstantine.bg/

Saints Constantine and Helena (Bulgarian: Св. св. Константин и Елена) is a resort town on the Bulgarian Black Sea coast within a landscaped park 10 km north of downtown Varna, 2 km east of its Vinitsa quarter, and 7 km south of Golden Sands. Bulgaria's oldest Black Sea resort was also known in the past as Druzhba (Дружба) and Varna Resort (Курорт Варна). It is served by the Varna International Airport and bus lines of the Varna public transit system.

Since starting the renewing of the complex in 2017, it becomes one of the most popular resorts in Bulgaria with several landmarks to see.

== History ==
=== Early history ===
Landmarks include the 16th-century Eastern Orthodox monastery of Sts. Constantine and Helena, the Euxinograd royal summer palace, park and winery, and the Sofia University Botanical Garden, also known as Ecopark Varna. One of the best-preserved medieval settlements in the country, Kastritzi, also mentioned by the Crusaders in 1444 as Macropolis, was unearthed in archaeological excavations inside Euxinograd. In the mid-14th century, Kastritzi was a bustling port of the Second Bulgarian Empire frequented by Venetian, Genoese, Ragusan, and Byzantine merchant ships.

=== 1905-2007: Establimishment as resort and development ===
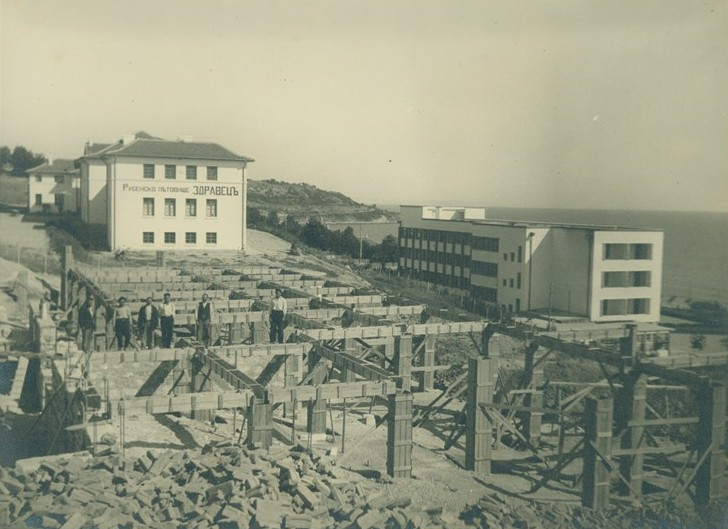
The construction of a student holiday resort in the Druzhba resort, mid-20th century.

In 1905 the construction of the first sea sanatorium in Bulgaria began - for children with tuberculosis at the initiative of the Bulgarian Queen Eleonore (second wife of Ferdinand I of Bulgaria) and with the active assistance of Dr. Paraskev Stoyanov. The doctor became the manager of the summer sanatorium, which treats scrofulous, lymphatic and anemic children. He was the first in Bulgaria to introduce sea treatment, sun treatment and mud therapy. He uses healing sea mud, which marks the beginning of scientific mud therapy in Bulgaria. The treatment is successful for most of the children as 60 - 65% of them recover completely. Over the next 5 years, the queen and Dr. Stoyanov disagreed over the construction of the new building of the children's sanatorium, which escalated into conflict and caused the doctor to leave his post in 1910. Now in this area is a complex "Sunny Day". It has been declared a private property with limited access, despite the Coastal Act, which guarantees free access of citizens to the beach.

The first holiday home was built in 1908. They are upgrading 2 floors on one of the old monastery buildings with the name Hotel Prague, because of the first foreigners accepted - Czechs. In March 1925, the Municipality of Varna decided to "build holiday resorts in the resort, a port and provide cheap transportation." In the early 1930s, the construction of the first holiday and grape healing station began. It has 140 rooms with sea views. It was opened on September 10, 1933, but closed at the beginning of World War II.

With the establishment of the Balkantourist business enterprise in 1948, contracts were signed to welcome Czech tourists to Bulgaria. New hotels were built: in 1949 - "Beach Hotel №1", later renamed the Hotel "Rose", and in 1951 - Hotel "Odessos". For political reasons, the resort is called "Balkantourist - Dobri Terpeshev", and between 1951 and 1956 was named "Varna". On December 1, 1955, the Council of Ministers issued a decree for the construction of two resorts near Varna: Druzhba and Golden Sands. The construction of the first one started in 1956/57 under the name "Balkantourist", and later it was called Druzhba. In 1956 the hotels "Chaika", "Bor", "Prostor", "Lebed", "Lotos", "Rusalka", "Rubin" and others were built. The resort's most prestigious five-star Grand Hotel, Varna, was opened on April 22, 1977, being built in just 17 months.

In 1992 The resort returned his old name - Saints Constantine and Helena. In the next few years the resort lost his glory with several hotels being closed because the complex itself becomes morally obsolete.

=== 2017-present: Renovation and new part ===
In 2017, as part of the renewing of the complex, the old thermal bath was reformed as Aquahouse Thermal & Beach. Also, a plan for 4 Artificial islands was set by the chief architect of Varna, Victor Buzev from the summer of 2017 Year later, Villa Chinka was opened as part of Astor Garden hotels line up in the complex. In 2019 was opened the renewed Center Primoski, having a shops, restaurant and hotel parts.

== Gallery ==
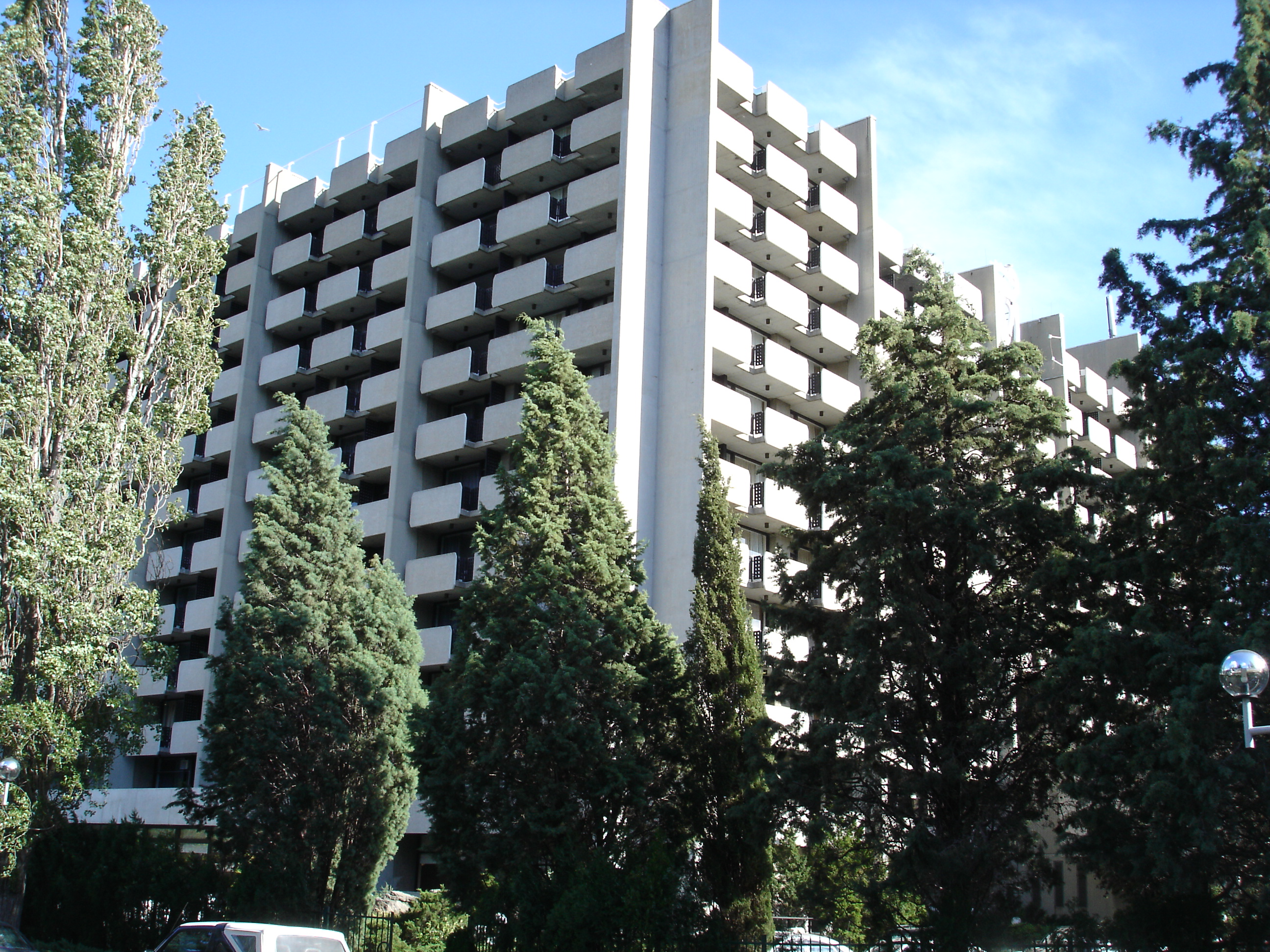
Grand Hotel Varna

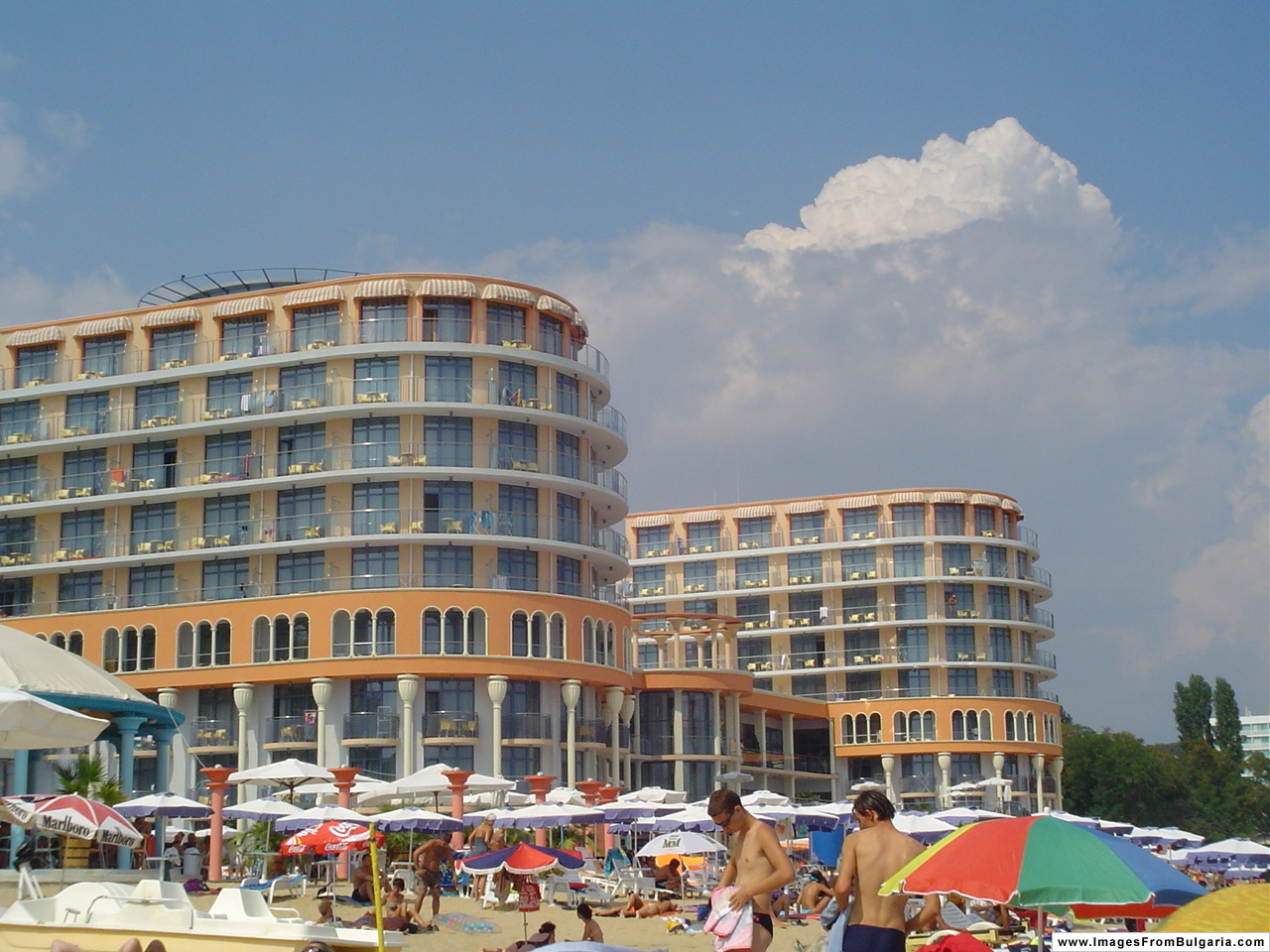
Hotel Azalia

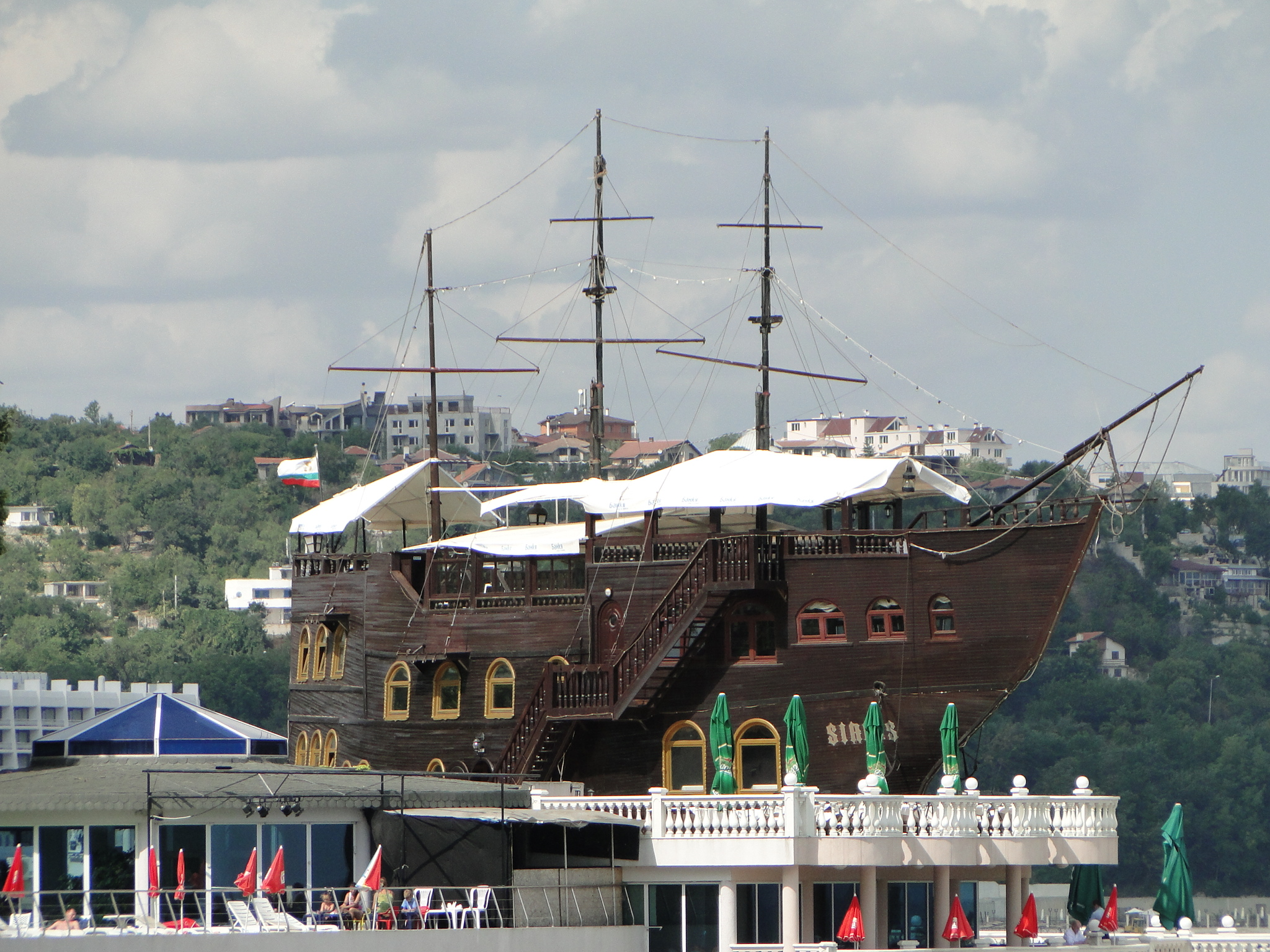
ship Sirius restaurant

== Climate ==
Saints Constantine and Helena has a humid subtropical climate (Köppen climate classification Cfa), with mediterranean influences in summer but specially continental influences in autumn-winter.

Climate data for Saints Constantine and Helena (2000–2019)
| Month | Jan | Feb | Mar | Apr | May | Jun | Jul | Aug | Sep | Oct | Nov | Dec | Year |
|---|---|---|---|---|---|---|---|---|---|---|---|---|---|
| Record high °C (°F) | 21.2 (70.2) | 22.5 (72.5) | 29.5 (85.1) | 30.7 (87.3) | 34.0 (93.2) | 38.0 (100.4) | 41.4 (106.5) | 38.9 (102.0) | 37.2 (99.0) | 33.0 (91.4) | 27.0 (80.6) | 21.2 (70.2) | 41.4 (106.5) |
| Mean daily maximum °C (°F) | 6.2 (43.2) | 7.8 (46.0) | 11.5 (52.7) | 15.7 (60.3) | 21.4 (70.5) | 26.2 (79.2) | 29.0 (84.2) | 29.6 (85.3) | 24.7 (76.5) | 18.7 (65.7) | 13.6 (56.5) | 8.2 (46.8) | 17.7 (63.9) |
| Daily mean °C (°F) | 3.1 (37.6) | 4.4 (39.9) | 7.8 (46.0) | 11.7 (53.1) | 17.1 (62.8) | 21.7 (71.1) | 24.3 (75.7) | 24.7 (76.5) | 20.2 (68.4) | 14.8 (58.6) | 10.4 (50.7) | 5.2 (41.4) | 13.8 (56.8) |
| Mean daily minimum °C (°F) | 0.1 (32.2) | 1.0 (33.8) | 4.0 (39.2) | 7.8 (46.0) | 12.7 (54.9) | 17.2 (63.0) | 19.5 (67.1) | 19.8 (67.6) | 15.7 (60.3) | 10.9 (51.6) | 7.2 (45.0) | 2.2 (36.0) | 9.8 (49.6) |
| Record low °C (°F) | −19.0 (−2.2) | −24.3 (−11.7) | −13.5 (7.7) | −5.0 (23.0) | 1.0 (33.8) | 5.0 (41.0) | 7.0 (44.6) | 6.0 (42.8) | 2.0 (35.6) | −7.7 (18.1) | −10.0 (14.0) | −17.0 (1.4) | −24.3 (−11.7) |
| Average precipitation mm (inches) | 31.8 (1.25) | 29.9 (1.18) | 43.7 (1.72) | 57 (2.2) | 43.9 (1.73) | 57.6 (2.27) | 50.7 (2.00) | 41.4 (1.63) | 44.1 (1.74) | 42.6 (1.68) | 55.6 (2.19) | 42 (1.7) | 540.3 (21.27) |
| Average precipitation days | 13.5 | 11.3 | 11.9 | 9.3 | 6.9 | 6.2 | 4.7 | 3.3 | 6.5 | 9.6 | 8.9 | 11.5 | 103.6 |
| Average relative humidity (%) | 77.9 | 75 | 73.3 | 73.7 | 74.8 | 72.5 | 69.7 | 69.4 | 73.1 | 77.6 | 78.1 | 79 | 74.5 |
| Mean monthly sunshine hours | 89.9 | 102.2 | 142.6 | 180.0 | 248.0 | 270.0 | 300.7 | 299.2 | 219.0 | 167.4 | 105.0 | 79.1 | 2,203 |
| Mean daily sunshine hours | 2.9 | 3.7 | 4.6 | 6.0 | 8.0 | 9.0 | 9.7 | 9.7 | 7.3 | 5.4 | 3.5 | 2.6 | 6.0 |
| Percentage possible sunshine | 32 | 34 | 38 | 46 | 53 | 60 | 65 | 69 | 61 | 49 | 35 | 29 | 48 |
Source 1: weatheronline.co.uk
Source 2: Weather Atlas (sunshine data)
