= Varna Airport =

Airport in Bulgaria

Varna Airport Летище Варна

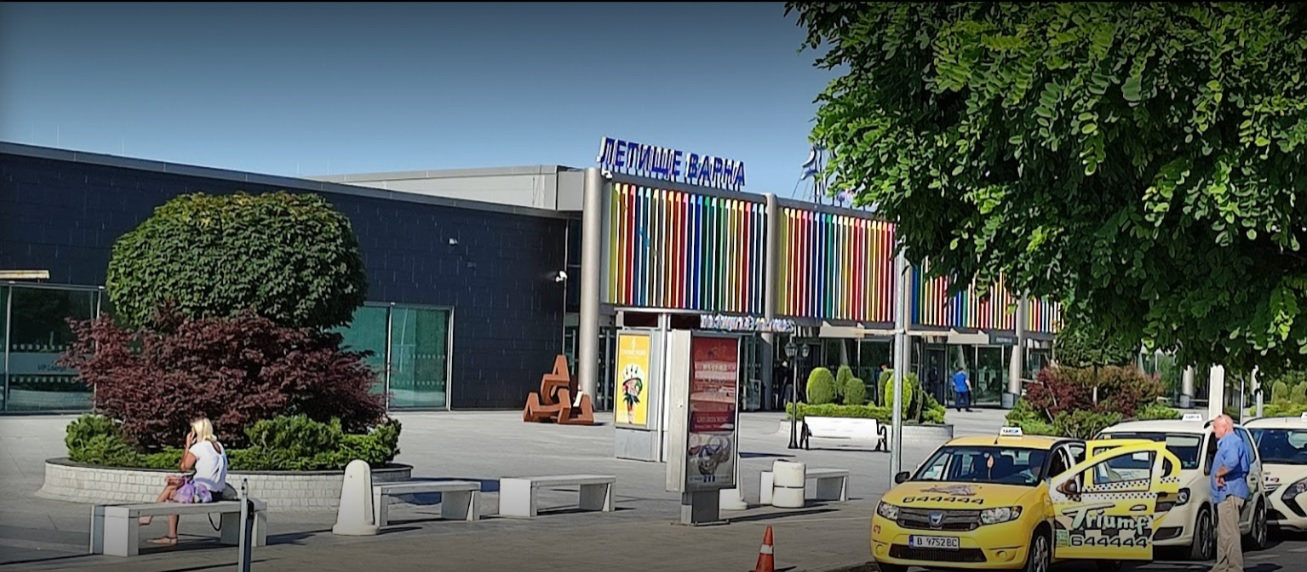
- IATA: VAR; ICAO: LBWN

Summary
- Airport type: Public
- Owner: State-owned
- Operator: Fraport Twin Star Airport Management AD
- Serves: Varna
- Location: Varna, Bulgaria
- Opened: 9 May 1948
- Time zone: EET (+2)
  - Summer (DST): EEST (+3)
- Elevation AMSL: 70 m (230 ft)
- Coordinates: 43°13′55″N 27°49′31″E
- Website: varna-airport.bg

Map
- Location of airport in Bulgaria Location of airport on the Black Sea

Runways
Direction	Length		Surface
Direction	m	ft	Surface
09/27	2,517	8,258	Asphalt

Statistics (2025)
- Passengers: 1,865,319
- Passenger change 2024–25: ▲19.8%
- Cargo (t): 195
- Cargo change 2024–25: ▲43.4%
- Instrument landing system: ILS Category I, runway 09
- Terminal buildings: 3; Terminal 2 for commercial use
- Gates: 10
- Terminal 2 construction cost: More than BGN 75 million (EUR 35 million)
- Sources: Bulgarian AIP at EUROCONTROL; 2025 traffic figures from Fraport Bulgaria.

Varna Airport (Bulgarian: Летище Варна, romanized: Letishte Varna) (IATA: VAR, ICAO: LBWN) is the airport of Varna, the historical maritime capital of Bulgaria. Varna Airport is the third largest airport in Bulgaria. It is located 10 kilometers from the center of Varna near the town of Aksakovo. The airport serves Varna, Golden Sands and northeastern Bulgaria. The busiest season for the airport is from the end of May to the beginning of October.

== History ==
From 15 October 2011 until 28 February 2012, Varna airport was closed for a reconstruction of the runway. All flights were operated to/from Burgas Airport.

== Airlines and destinations ==
The following airlines operate regular scheduled and charter flights at Varna Airport:

Airlines	Destinations
Air Serbia	Seasonal: Belgrade
Austrian Airlines	Vienna
Bulgaria Air	Sofia; Seasonal: Frankfurt, Paris–Charles de Gaulle, Prague
Discover Airlines	Frankfurt; Seasonal: Munich
Edelweiss Air	Seasonal: Zürich
Electra Airways	Seasonal: Stuttgart
Eurowings	Seasonal: Cologne/Bonn, Düsseldorf, Hamburg, Stuttgart
Fly Lili	Seasonal charter: Hannover
GetJet Airlines	Seasonal charter: Vilnius
Israir	Tel Aviv
LOT Polish Airlines	Seasonal charter: Warsaw
Luxair	Seasonal: Luxembourg
Norwegian Air Shuttle	Seasonal: Oslo
Ryanair	Seasonal: Katowice, Kraków
Scandinavian Airlines	Seasonal: Copenhagen
Smartwings	Seasonal: Brno, Ostrava, Prague; Seasonal charter: Karlovy Vary
Sunclass Airlines	Seasonal charter: Bergen, Helsinki
Sundair	Seasonal: Bremen
Sundor	Seasonal: Tel Aviv
Transavia	Seasonal: Paris–Orly
TUI fly Belgium	Seasonal: Brussels
TUI fly Deutschland	Seasonal: Hannover
Turkish Airlines	Istanbul
Volotea	Seasonal: Lille, Nantes
Wizz Air	Basel (begins 27 October 2026),Berlin, Bratislava, Brussels–Charleroi, Dortmund, Eindhoven, Frankfurt–Hahn, Hamburg, London–Luton, Memmingen, Milan–Bergamo, Yerevan (begins 6 June 2027); Seasonal: Athens, Barcelona, Budapest, Debrecen, Gdańsk, Katowice, Larnaca (begins 30 March 2027), Nuremberg, Paris–Beauvais, Rome–Fiumicino, Tel Aviv, Warsaw–Modlin, Wrocław

== Statistics ==
=== Traffic ===
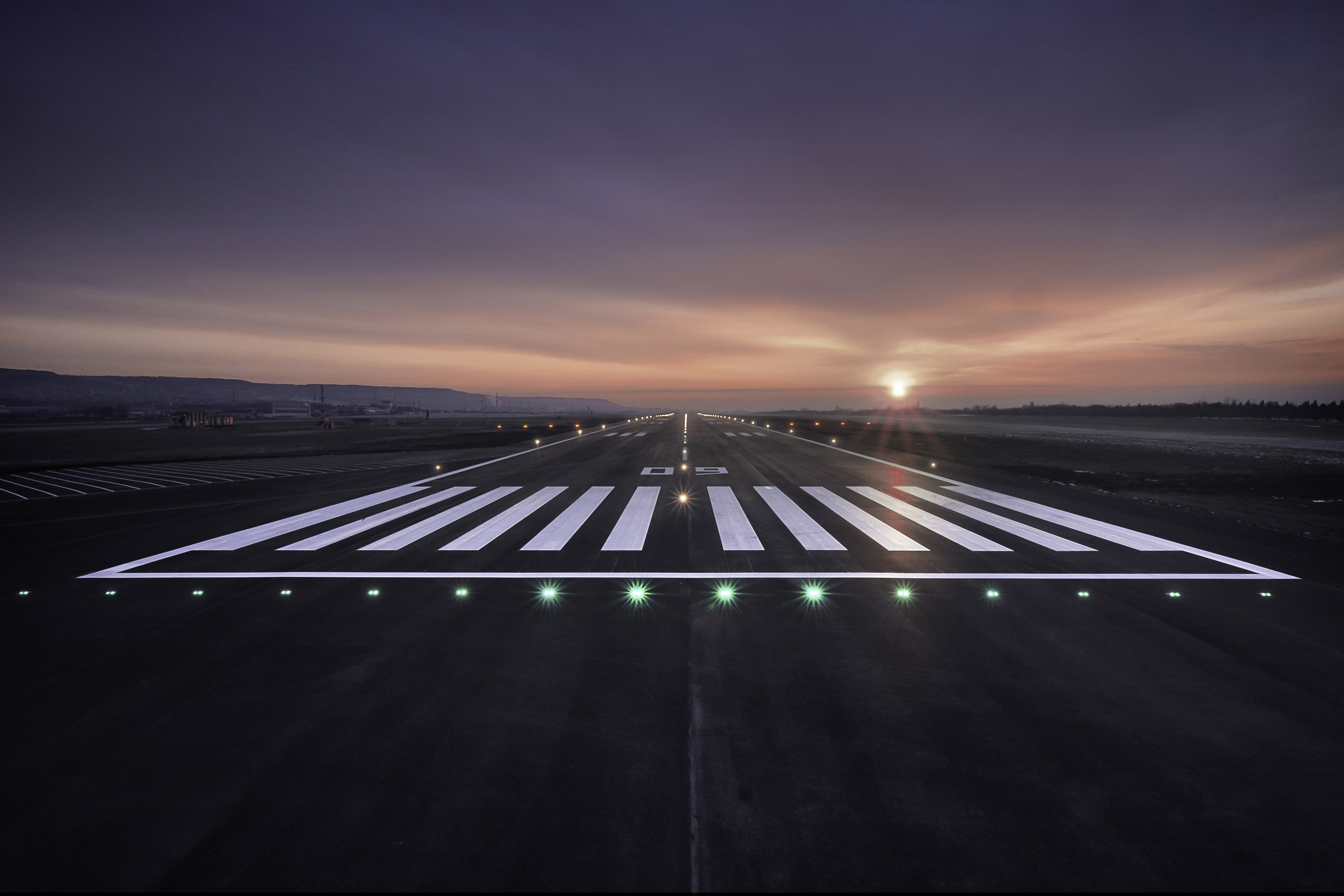
The runway

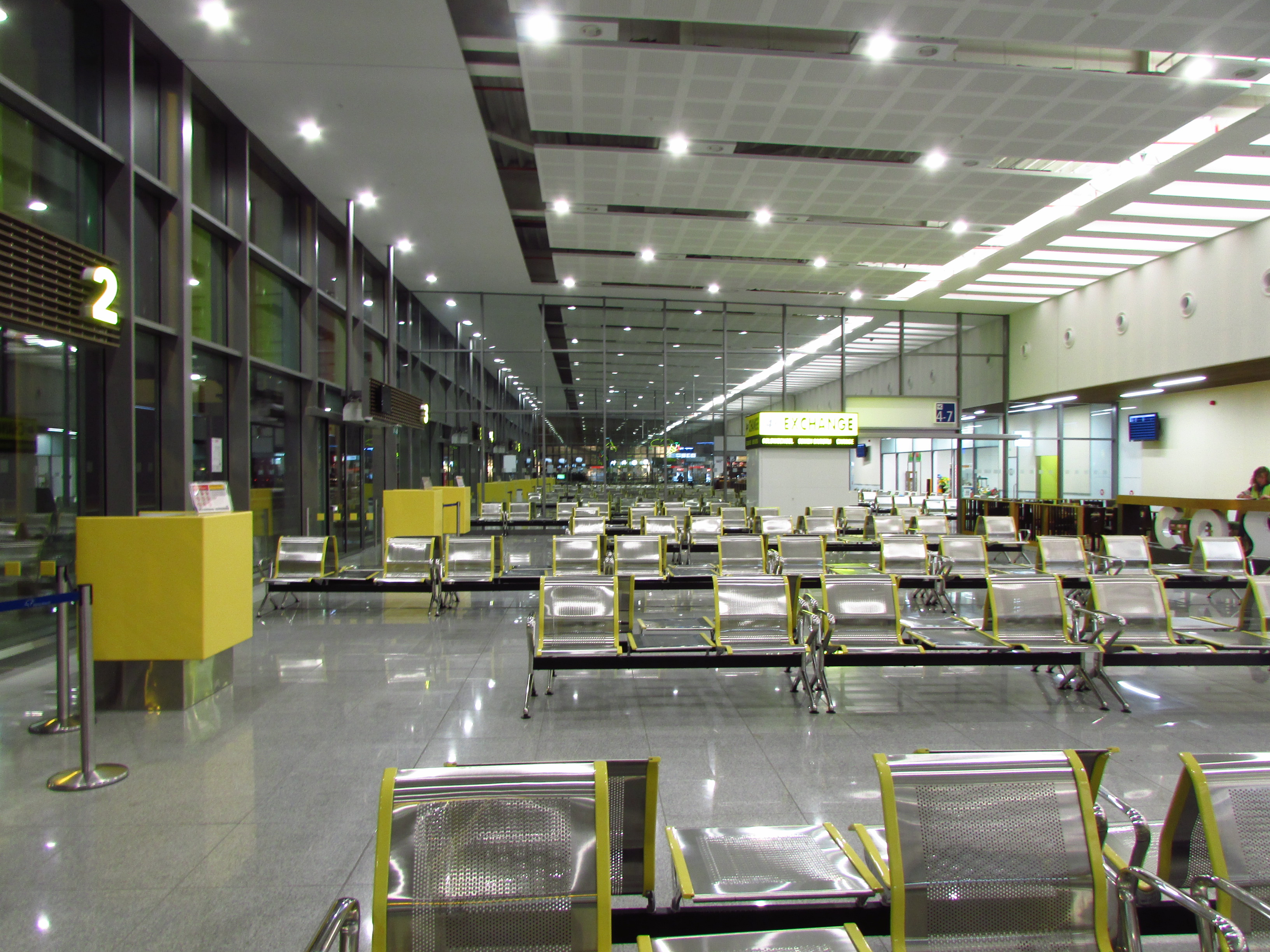
Terminal 2 gate area

Airport building by night

Traffic at Varna Airport
Year	Passengers	Change	Cargo (tonnes)	Change	Aircraft movements	Change
1998	273,678	Steady	114	Steady	8,920	Steady
1999	511,819	▲87.0%	0	▼100.0%	9,030	▲1.2%
2000	691,689	▲35.1%	0	Steady	9,425	▲4.4%
2001	932,549	▲34.8%	160	▲16000.0%	9,549	▲1.3%
2002	1,090,709	▲16.9%	85	▼46.9%	9,006	▼5.7%
2003	1,186,349	▲8.8%	0	▼100.0%	10,107	▲12.2%
2004	1,337,145	▲12.7%	136	▲13600.0%	11,277	▲11.6%
2005	1,546,925	▲15.7%	19	▼86.0%	13,616	▲20.7%
2006	1,522,658	▼1.6%	289	▲1421.0%	14,721	▲8.1%
2007	1,478,093	▼2.9%	150	▼48.1%	14,971	▲1.7%
2008	1,432,703	▼3.1%	1,004	▲569.3%	15,129	▲1.1%
2009	1,206,535	▼15.8%	89	▼91.1%	12,699	▼16.1%
2010	1,198,956	▼0.6%	83	▼6.7%	12,601	▼1.0%
2011	1,165,304	▼2.8%	41	▼50.6%	11,263	▼10.4%
2012	1,212,215	▲4.0%	33	▼19.5%	10,739	▼4.7%
2013	1,303,865	▲7.6%	35	▲6.1%	11,516	▲7.2%
2014	1,387,494	▲5.2%	74	▲111.4%	12,063	▲4.7%
2015	1,398,694	▲0.8%	118	▲57.2%	11,959	▼0.9%
2016	1,689,595	▲20.8%	3,293	▲2690.7%	14,818	▲23.9%
2017	1,970,700	▲16.6%	293	▼91.0%	15,950	▲7.6%
2018	2,281,134	▲15.8%	136	▼40.6%	17,776	▲11.4%
2019	2,084,319	▼8.7%	123	▼9.3%	15,468	▼13.0%
2020	622,215	▼70.1%	44	▼64.1%	6,881	▼55.5%
2021	1,010,494	▲62.4%	34	▼23.9%	9,239	▲34.3%
2022	1,484,186	▲46.9%	104	▲205.8%	11,420	▲23.6%
2023	1,838,828	▲23.9%	62	▼39.8%	13,850	▲21.3%
2024	1,556,798	▼-15.3%	136	▲119.4%	12,282	▼-11.3%
2025	1,865,319	▲19.8%	195	▲43.4%	14,159	▲15.3%

Top Markets at Varna Airport (2025)
Rank	Country	Passengers
1	Germany	596,000
2	Bulgaria	225,000
3	United Kingdom	151,000
4	Austria	145,000
5	Poland	142,000

Top Destinations (2025)
Rank	Destination
1	Sofia
2	London–Luton
3	Vienna
4	Istanbul
5	Frankfurt

== Ground transport ==
Bus line 409 connects the airport with Varna city center and resorts nearby (route: Varna Airport – Mall Varna – Varna Bus Station / Grand Mall – City Center – Saints Constantine and Helena - Golden Sands).

The bus runs from 05:45 AM until 11 PM in every 15 minutes (four courses) - two of the courses are conducted by Varna municipal transportation company (tickets are available online in the TTickets Varna app) and two by a private company (tickets only in the bus). The municipal and the private company have different prices - for the municipal you can use the 60-minutes ticket at 0,51 EUR (if you travel to Varna which is 30 minutes from the airport and Saints Constantine and Helen which is 46 minutes) and the 90-minutes ticket at 0,77 EUR (if you travel to Golden Sands which is around 70 minutes) while the private company offers the ticket at 1,10 EUR .

== Incidents and accidents ==
- On 7 March 1983, Balkan Bulgarian Airlines Flight 013, an Antonov An-24 operating a domestic flight from Sofia to Varna, was hijacked by four men armed with knives who demanded to be flown to Vienna. The crew continued towards Varna while authorities extinguished much of the city's lighting to prevent the hijackers from recognising the Black Sea coast. After the aircraft landed, Bulgarian security forces stormed it; three hijackers were arrested, one was shot dead, and a flight attendant was injured.
- On 5 June 1992, Balkan Bulgarian Airlines Tupolev 154B overran runway 27 in bad weather conditions. There were no casualties, but the plane was written off.
- On 24 May 2013, Air VIA Flight 502, an Airbus A320-232 registered LZ-MDR and arriving from Leipzig, overran runway 09 after landing at Varna Airport. The aircraft crossed the runway-end safety area, struck the perimeter fence and came to rest beyond the airport boundary. During the evacuation, two passengers sustained serious injuries, and the aircraft was substantially damaged.

== See also ==
- List of airports in Bulgaria
- List of airlines of Bulgaria
- List of the busiest airports in Europe by passenger traffic
