= Electra Airways =

Bulgarian charter airline

Electra Airways Електра Еъруейс

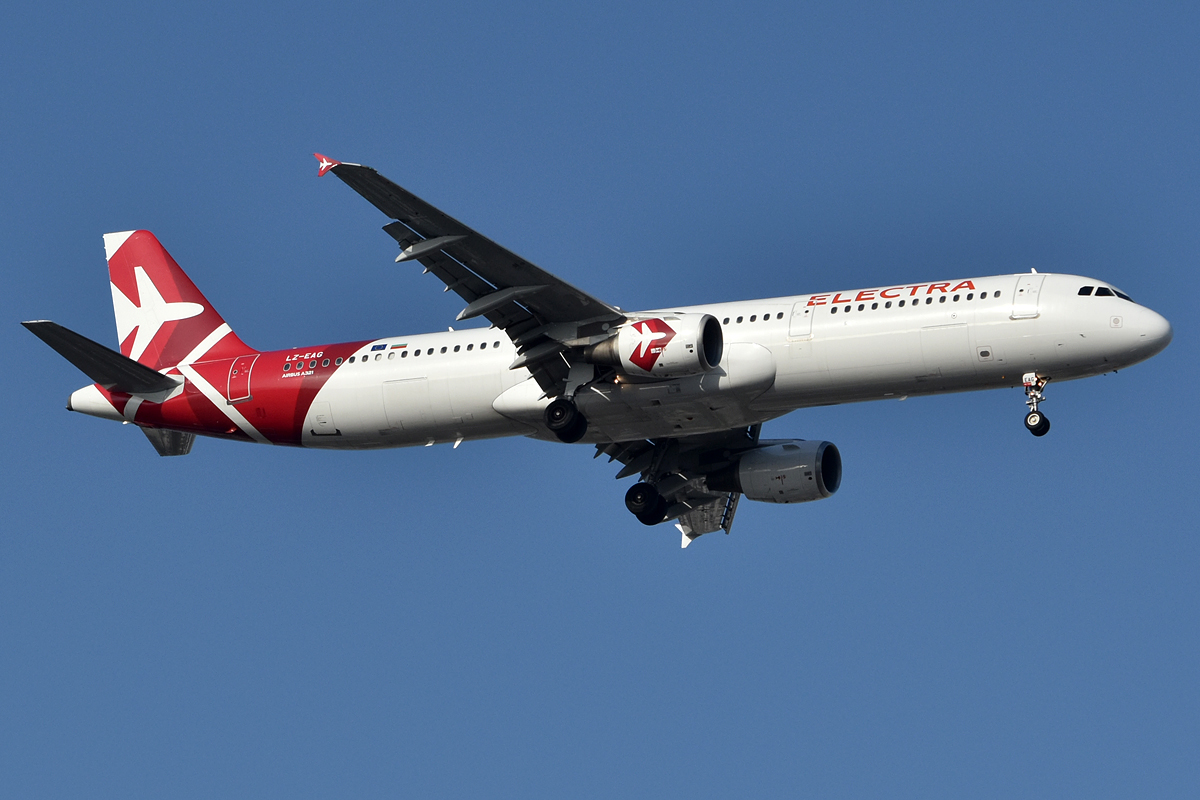
- Airbus A321
IATA	ICAO	Call sign
3E	EAF	ELECTRA
- Founded: 2016; 10 years ago
- Commenced operations: August 2017; 9 years ago
- AOC #: BG 60
- Hubs: Varna Airport, Katowice Airport, Burgas Airport
- Fleet size: 15
- Headquarters: Sofia, Bulgaria
- Website: www.electra-airways.com

Electra Airways is a Bulgarian charter and aircraft leasing airline with headquarters in Sofia, Bulgaria.

== History ==
The airline was founded in 2016 and commenced flight operations in August 2017 with a single Airbus A320 for various tour operators. In 2022 the airline became a part of Vector Group, international aviation holding, comprised by the airline, as well as by the MRO "ETG Maintenance", leasing company "Maverick Horizon" and a capacity provider "Classic Air".

As of 2026 Electra Airways operates fifteen A320 family Aircraft (13 A320 and 2 A321), leasing them from Avolon, Carlyle Aviation Partners and Maverick Horizon.

In 2024 Electra Airways and SunExpress announced a new partnership with flights from German airports to Varna and Burgas, covering a three-year contract from Bulgarian Black Sea Coast. The airline will deploy two aircraft respectively, gradually increasing them to 6 over the next three years. From 2026 the deal was suspended and switched to ACMI contract in Egypt with two A320 operating for SunExpress.

From the spring of 2025, Electra Airways launched cooperation and with the Polish tour operator, Itaka for charter flights from Poland, Czech Republic and Slovakia under the brand "Air 001" (owned by Itaka but fully managed by Electra Airways).

== Destinations ==
The airline currently operates flights in Europe (Austria, Bulgaria, Germany, Greece, Italy, Poland), North Africa (Tunisia, Morocco), and the Middle East.

== Fleet ==
=== Current fleet ===
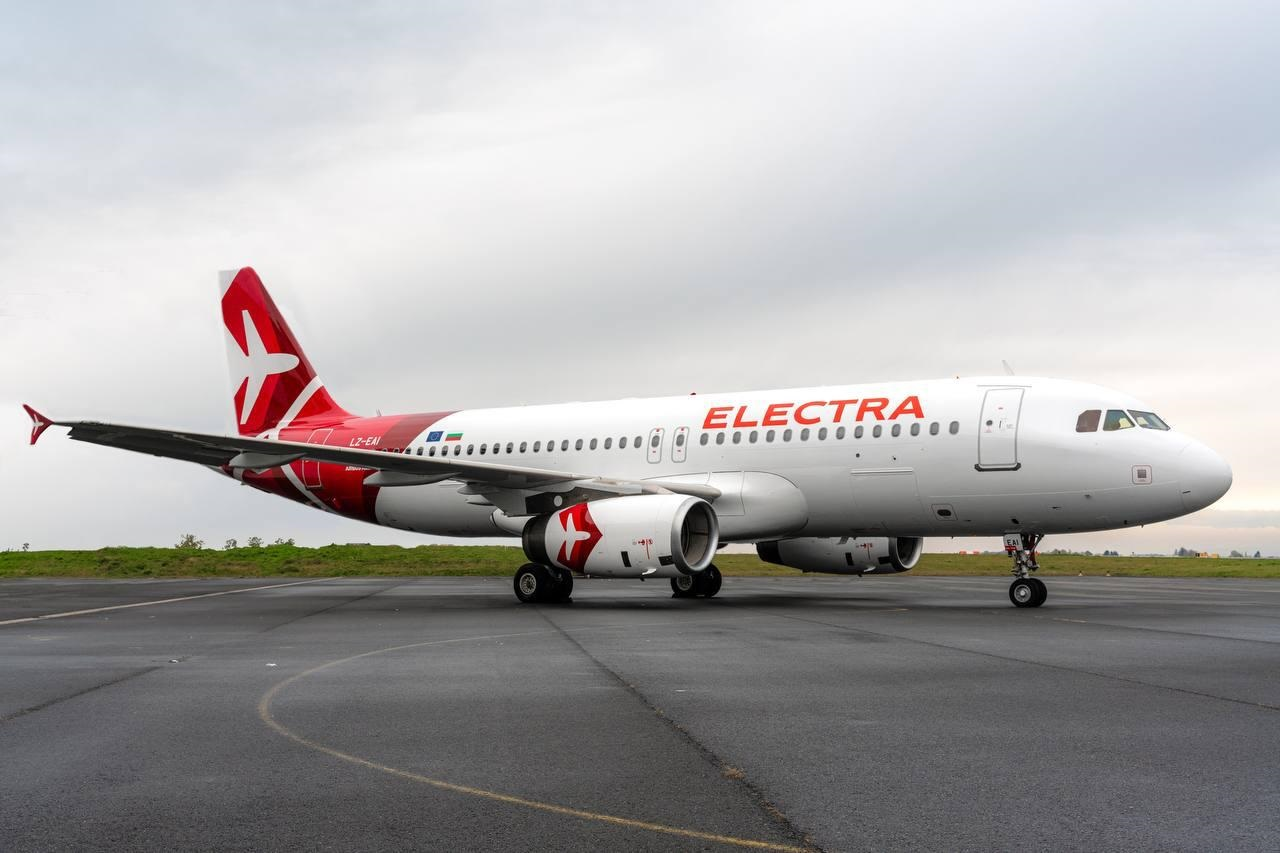
Airbus A320-200

As of July 2026, Electra Airways operates the following aircraft:

Electra Airways fleet
Aircraft	In service	Orders	Passengers	Notes
Airbus A320-200	13	—	180	
Airbus A321-100	2	—	219	
Total	15	—		
