= Burgas Airport =

Commercial airport serving Burgas, Bulgaria

Burgas Airport Летище Бургас Letishte Burgas

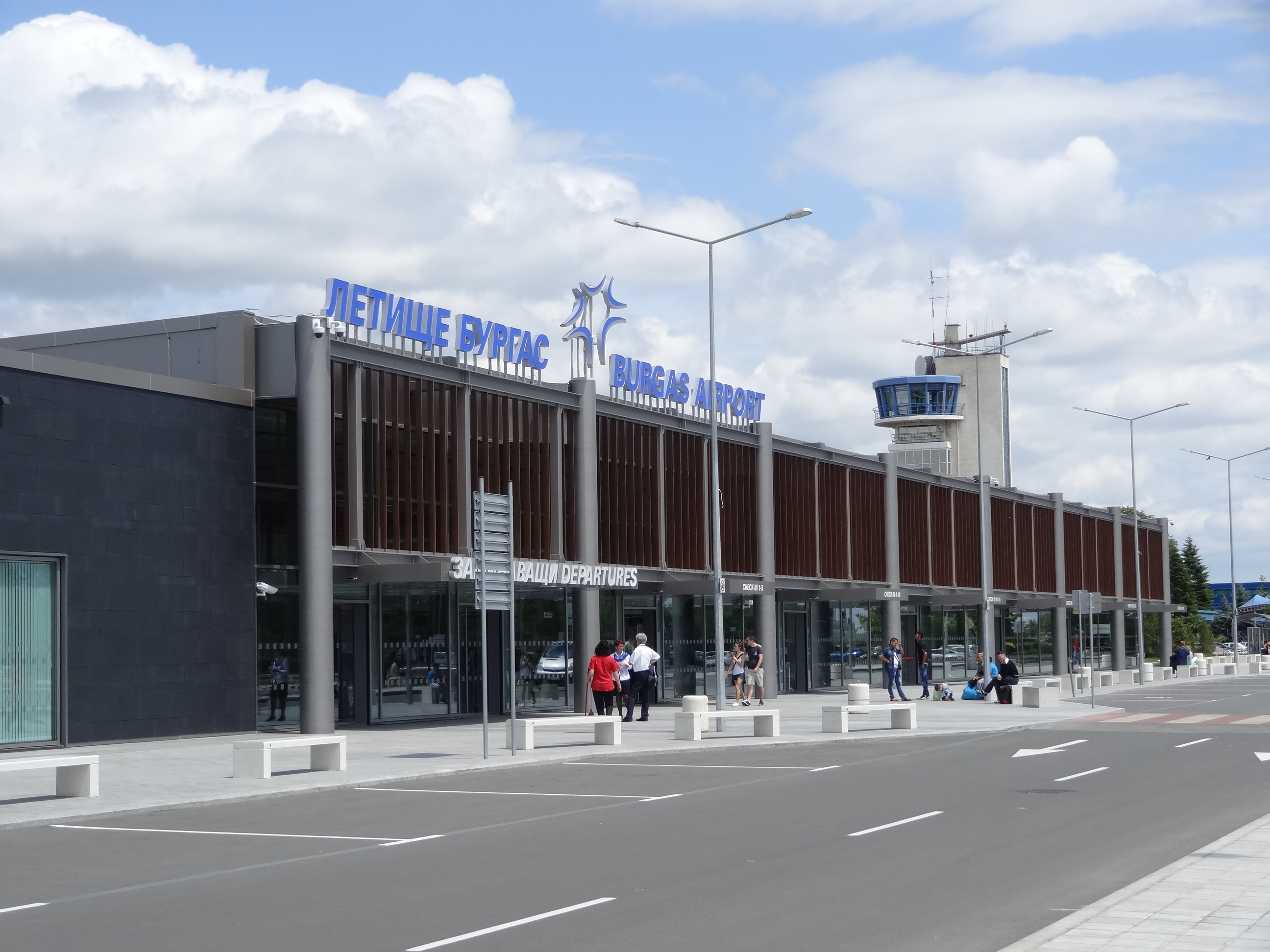
- IATA: BOJ; ICAO: LBBG

Summary
- Airport type: Public
- Owner: State-owned
- Operator: Fraport Twin Star Airport Management AD
- Serves: Burgas
- Location: Burgas, Bulgaria
- Opened: 27 June 1937; 89 years ago
- Time zone: EET (+2)
  - Summer (DST): EEST (+3)
- Elevation AMSL: 41 m (135 ft)
- Coordinates: 42°34′13″N 027°30′55″E
- Website: www.burgas-airport.bg

Map
- Location of airport in Bulgaria

Runways
Direction	Length		Surface
Direction	m	ft	Surface
04/22	3,200	10,500	Asphalt

Statistics (2023)
- Passengers: 1,848,169
- Passenger change 22-23: ▲12.4%
- Aircraft movements: 13,174
- Movements change 22-23: ▲7.2%
- Cargo (tons): 2,556
- Cargo change 22-23: ▼59.1%

Burgas Airport (IATA: BOJ, ICAO: LBBG) is an international airport in southeast Bulgaria and the second largest airport in the country. It is near the northern neighbourhood of Sarafovo approximately 10 km (6.2 mi) from the city centre. The airport principally serves Burgas and other seaside resorts of the Bulgarian south coast which attract many tourists during the summer leisure season.

== History ==
=== Early years ===
On 29 June 1947, Balkan Bulgarian Airlines began domestic flights between Burgas, Plovdiv and Sofia, using Junkers Ju 52/3m aircraft. In the 1950s and 1960s, the airport was expanded and modernized by building a concrete runway. In 1970, the airport became an international airport serving 45 destinations.

=== Development since the 2000s ===
Burgas airport has been subject to heavy traffic following the growing tourism industry in Bulgaria and was in need of major investments to expand and handle projected passenger traffic. In June 2006, the Bulgarian Government awarded Fraport AG Frankfurt Airport Services Worldwide a 40-year-long concession on both Varna and Burgas airports in return for investments exceeding €500 million.

Fraport entered into partnership with Varna-based company BM Star. The concessionaire has vowed to inject €403 million in the two airports during the lifespan of the arrangement. Fraport will pay 60% of an investment of €403 million over the 35-year concession. The investments will be made in new terminal facilities, vehicles and equipment and expanding apron areas at the airports over the life of the concession.

== Facilities ==
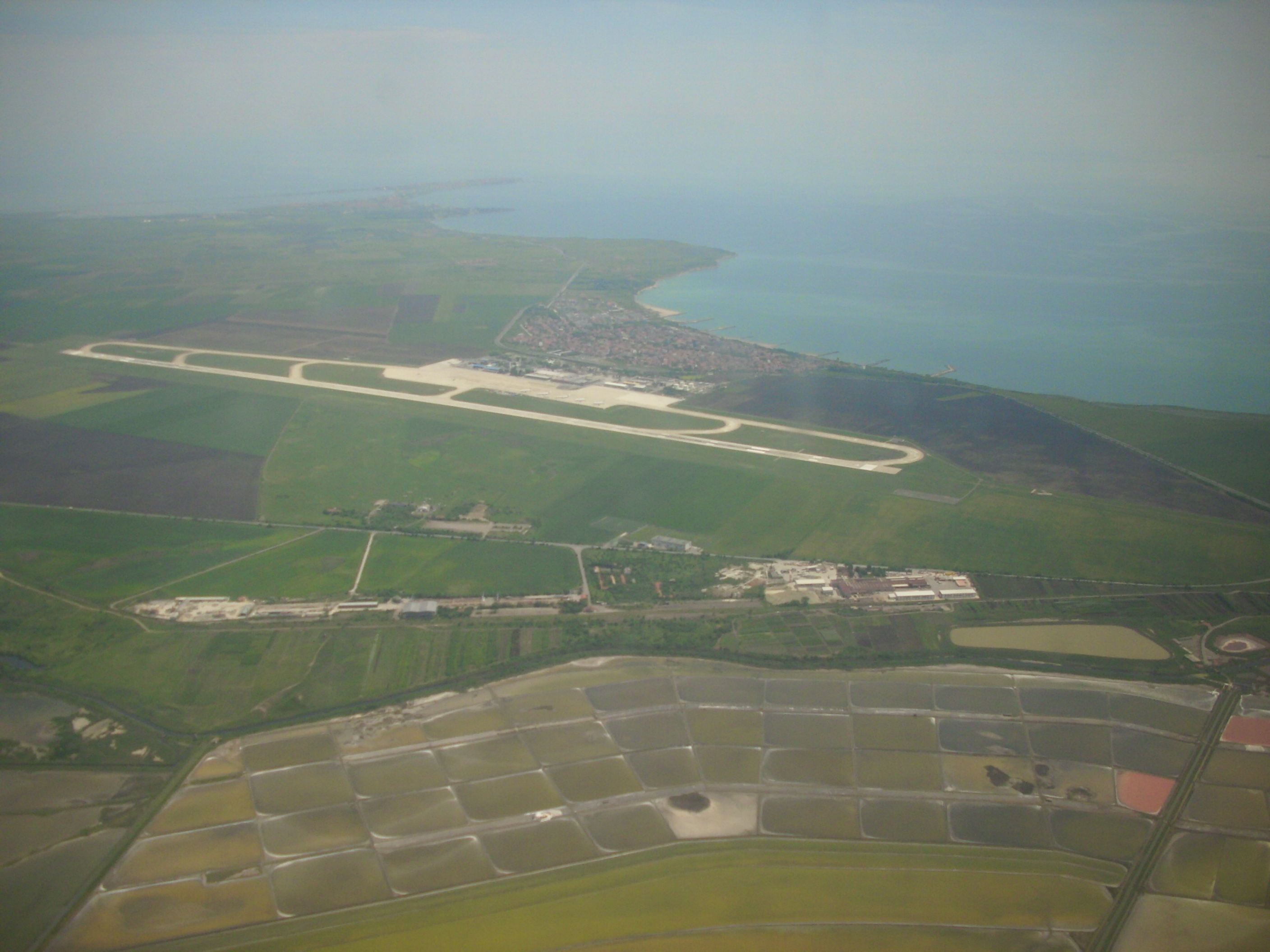
Aerial view of Burgas Airport

=== Terminals ===
In December 2011, construction work began on the new Terminal 2. The new terminal was planned to have a capacity of 2,700,000 passengers and an area of 21,000 m^{2} (230,000 sq ft). The new terminal building was designed so that it can be easily upgraded to further increase capacity, if necessary. Construction of the new terminal was completed in 2013, and has been operational since December 2013.

Terminal 2 replaced the older Terminal 1, which was built in the 1950s and expanded in the early 1990s, and now handles all of the airport's passenger traffic. The terminal is equipped with 31 check-in counters, three boarding-card checkpoints, nine security lanes and eight departure gates. The arrivals area (divided into Schengen and non-Schengen zones) has 12 immigration stations and four baggage carousels (one 120 metres (390 ft) long and three 70 metres (230 ft) long carousels). Passenger amenities include 800 square metres (8,600 sq ft) of space dedicated to shopping and 1,220 square metres (13,100 sq ft) for food and beverage (F&B) services. There is also a 550 square metres (5,900 sq ft) outdoor courtyard.

=== Runway ===
The runway is 3,200 metres (10,500 ft) long.

On 31 October 2016, reconstruction and rehabilitation of taxiways began at Burgas airport. The project includes a complete rehabilitation of 3,500 square meters of taxiway "H", complete rehabilitation of taxiway "A", as well as area adjacent to the runway holding point. The control and monitoring system for airfield lighting and approach light equipment will be replaced. The total investment of Fraport Twin Star Airport Management in these projects is over €6 million.

== Airlines and destinations ==
The following airlines operate regular scheduled and charter flights at Burgas Airport:

Airlines	Destinations
Aer Lingus	Seasonal: Dublin
airBaltic	Seasonal: Riga, Tallinn
Austrian Airlines	Seasonal: Vienna
Avion Express	Seasonal charter: Vilnius
Bluebird Airways	Seasonal: Tel Aviv
Bulgaria Air	Groningen, Sofia, Yerevan
Corendon Dutch Airlines	Seasonal: Amsterdam, Brussels, Maastricht/Aachen
Discover Airlines	Seasonal: Frankfurt, Munich
easyJet	Seasonal: Berlin, London–Gatwick, Manchester
Electra Airways	Seasonal charter: Brno, Debrecen, Tel Aviv
Enter Air	Gdańsk, Warsaw
Eurowings	Seasonal: Cologne/Bonn, Düsseldorf, Hamburg, Prague, Salzburg, Stuttgart
Finnair	Seasonal charter: Helsinki
Freebird Airlines	Leipzig
GetJet Airlines	Seasonal charter: Vilnius
HelloJets	Prague
Iberojet	Seasonal charter: Madrid
Israir	Tel Aviv
Jet2.com	Seasonal: Birmingham, Bristol, East Midlands, Edinburgh, Glasgow, Leeds/Bradford, Liverpool, London–Gatwick, London–Stansted, Manchester, Newcastle upon Tyne
Jet Time	Seasonal charter: Umeå
LOT Polish Airlines	Warsaw; Seasonal charter: Katowice
Luxair	Seasonal: Luxembourg
Neos	Tel Aviv
Norwegian Air Shuttle	Seasonal: Bergen, Copenhagen, Helsinki, Oslo, Riga, Stockholm–Arlanda, Trondheim
Ryanair	Seasonal: Bratislava, Budapest, Dublin, Gdańsk, Kaunas, Kraków, London–Luton, Poznań, Rome–Fiumicino, Rzeszow, Vienna, Warsaw–Modlin Wrocław
Scandinavian Airlines	Seasonal charter: Copenhagen, Stavanger, Trondheim
Smartwings	Seasonal: Bratislava, Brno, Košice, Ostrava, Pardubice, Prague; Seasonal charter: České Budějovice, Gdańsk, Katowice
Sundair	Seasonal: Berlin-Brandenburg, Dresden
Transavia	Seasonal: Paris–Orly
TUI Airways	Seasonal: Birmingham, Bristol, Cardiff, Gdansk, London Gatwick, Manchester, Newcastle upon Tyne
TUI fly Belgium	Seasonal: Brussels
TUI fly Deutschland	Seasonal: Hannover
TUI fly Netherlands	Seasonal: Amsterdam
TUI fly Nordic	Seasonal charter: Gothenburg
Volotea	Seasonal: Lille
Wizz Air	Budapest, Gdańsk, Katowice, London–Luton, Lublin, Warsaw

== Statistics ==
=== Traffic ===
Traffic at Burgas Airport
Year	Passengers	Change	Cargo (tonnes)	Change	Aircraft movements	Change
1998	433,024	Steady	39	Steady	6,092	Steady
1999	339,297	▼21.6%	31	▼20.5%	5,722	▼6.1%
2000	398,015	▲17.3%	36	▲16.1%	5,224	▼8.7%
2001	594,396	▲49.3%	53	▲47.2%	5,964	▲14.2%
2002	767,476	▲29.1%	925	▼1645.3%	6,708	▲12.5%
2003	1,026,134	▲33.7%	635	▼31.4%	8,963	▲33.6%
2004	1,352,173	▲31.8%	899	▲41.6%	11,199	▲25.0%
2005	1,556,091	▲15.1%	122	▼86.4%	12,496	▲11.6%
2006	1,802,135	▲15.8%	405	▲232.0%	14,429	▲15.5%
2007	1,941,311	▲7.7%	2,051	▲406.4%	16,114	▲11.7%
2008	1,925,266	▼0.8%	1,338	▼34.8%	16,868	▲4.7%
2009	1,689,866	▼12.3%	2,597	▲94.1%	15,636	▼7.3%
2010	1,874,562	▲10.9%	5,654	▲117.7%	15,775	▲0.9%
2011	2,229,045	▲19.0%	5,991	▲6.0%	19,215	▲19.0%
2012	2,358,159	▲5.8%	2,281	▼61.9%	18,856	▼1.9%
2013	2,480,099	▲5.1%	2,625	▲15.1%	18,447	▼2.2%
2014	2,522,319	▲2.6%	5,354	▲104.0%	18,869	▲0.8%
2015	2,360,320	▼6.7%	13,272	▲147.9%	18,271	▼4.3%
2016	2,878,883	▲22.0%	10,877	▼18.0%	20,873	▲14.2%
2017	2,982,339	▲3.6%	14,300	▲31.5%	21,466	▲2.8%
2018	3,277,229	▲9.9%	8,429	▼41.1%	23,284	▲8.5%
2019	2,885,776	▼12.0%	4,747	▼43.7%	19,954	▼14.3%
2020	424,252	▼85.3%	3,889	▼18.1%	4,079	▼79.6%
2021	955,402	▲125.2%	4,669	▲20.1%	8,295	▲103.3%
2022	1,643,581	▲72.2%	6,244	▲33.7%	12,293	▲48.2%
2023	1,848,058	▲12.4%	2,556	▼59.1%	13,174	▲7.2%
2024	1,808,236	▼ -2.2%	655	▼ -74.4%	12,902	▼ -2.1%

Top 5 markets (2023)
Rank	Destination	Passengers
1	Poland	473,868
2	United Kingdom	376,570
3	Czech Republic	206,810
4	Germany	159,440
5	Israel	88,294

Top 5 cities (2023)
Rank	Destination	Passengers
1	London	142,809
2	Warsaw	128,778
3	Katowice	112,569
4	Prague	109,985
5	Tel Aviv	88,294

== Ground transportation ==
=== Bus ===
Line No 15 connects Burgas airport with Burgas South bus station.

Intercity buses from Burgas to Pomorie, Aheloy, Ravda, Nessebar and Sunny beach also stop close to the airport. The stop is located at the roundabout on the main road across from the terminal building.

=== Taxi ===
The Taxi Piazza is located in front of the Arrivals Terminal at Burgas Airport. A taxi ride from Burgas Airport to the city takes approximately 15 minutes, depending on the traffic intensity. The prices start from €25 depending where in the city you need to go.

=== Parking ===
Passengers and guests arriving at Burgas Airport with their personal car can use the commercially available parking lot, located in the immediate vicinity of the main terminal building. The parking lot has 199 car spaces available and is accessible 24 hours a day.

== Incidents and accidents ==
- On 18 July 2012, an attack at Burgas Airport occurred. A suicide bomber boarded a bus which was transporting Israeli citizens to the Bulgarian resort of Sunny Beach located in Burgas, the perpetrator detonated the bomb killing six civilians (and the suicide bomber) as well as injuring 32 people. The attack resulted in the closure of Burgas Airport for over 30 hours, resulting in the majority of flights diverting to Varna Airport.

== See also ==
- List of airports in Bulgaria
- List of airlines of Bulgaria
- List of the busiest airports in Europe
- 2012 Burgas bus bombing
