= List of airlines of Bulgaria =

This is a list of airlines currently operating in Bulgaria.

== Scheduled airlines ==
Airline	IATA	ICAO	Image	Callsign	Commenced operations	Notes
Bulgaria Air	FB	LZB		FLYING BULGARIA	2002	Flag carrier Previously Balkan Air Tour
GullivAir	G2	TJJ		THUNDERBOLT	2020	

== Charter airlines ==
Airline	IATA	ICAO	Image	Callsign	Commenced operations	Notes
Air Lazur		LZR		LAZUR BEE-GEE	2002	
ALK Airlines		VBB		AIR LUBO	2016	
Aviostart		VSR		AVIOSTART	1999	
BH Air	8H	BGH		BALKAN HOLIDAYS	2002	
Electra Airways	3E	EAF		ELECTRA	2017	
European Air Charter	H6	BUC		EUROCHARTER	2000	Previously Bulgarian Air Charter
Fly2Sky Airlines	F6	VAW		Sofia Jet	2017	Previously VIA Airways
Heli Air Services		HLR		HELI BULGARIA	1990	
Holiday Europe	5Q	HES		HOLIDAY EUROPE	2019	
Jetsky Airways	JK	JTK		JETSKY	2021	
Voyage Air	VO	VRG		VARNA LINES	2006	AOC suspended

== Cargo airlines ==
Airline	IATA	ICAO	Image	Callsign	Commenced operations
Cargoair		CGF		CLEVER	2008
Compass Cargo Airlines		ADZ		MIGRATOR	2021

== See also ==
- List of airlines
- List of defunct airlines of Bulgaria
- List of defunct airlines of Europe
