= List of defunct airlines of Bulgaria =

This is a list of defunct airlines of Bulgaria.

Airline	Image	IATA	ICAO	Callsign	Commenced operations	Ceased operations	Notes
Air Ban			BAN	AIR BAN	1994	1997	
Air Ban			LZP	TUS AIR	1999	2009	Operated Eurocopter AS365 Dauphin, MBB Bo 105
Air Bright			REM		2006	2015	Renamed Rose Air
Air Kona			KON		1993	1994	Operated Tupolev Tu-154
Air Mark Cargo					2002	2006	Operated Antonov An-12
Air Max			RMX	AEROMAX	1996	2007	Operated Antonov An-26, Let L-410 Turbolet
Air Nove		CR	NHA	AIR NOVE	1998	2001	Operated Antonov An-26
Air Scorpio			SCU	SCORPIO UNIVERSE	1996	?	Operated Antonov An-12, Antonov An-24, Antonov An-26, Antonov An-74, Let L-410 Turbolet, Tupolev Tu-154
Air Sofia		CT	SFB	AIR SOFIA	1992	2007	Relocated to Serbia as United International Airlines.
Air Syder Bulgarian Airways		B5	SDR		1993	1995	Operated Ilyushin Il-76
Air Varna			BAV		1993	1994	
Air VIA		VL	VIM	CRYSTAL	1991	2016	
Air Zory			MZA		1993	1998	
Balkan Bulgarian Airlines		LZ	LAZ	BALKAN	1968	2002	Went bankrupt Operations merged into Balkan Air Tour
Balkan Air Tour		FB	LZB		2002	2003	Operated Boeing 737-300, Tupolev Tu-154. Renamed Bulgaria Air
Balkanian Airways					2012	?	Operated Boeing 737-300
Bexx Air					2004	2004	Rebranded Imagine Air
Bright Aviation Services			BRW	BRIGHT SERVICES	2001	2007	Operated Antonov An-12, Antonov An-26, BAe 146
Bright Flight			BFG		2014	2019	Operated ATR 42, BAe 146
Bulair		DB			1968	1972	Charter subsidiary of TABSO and later Balkan Bulgarian Airlines
Bulgarian Air Charter		1T	BUC	BULGURIAN CHARTER	2000	2021	Renamed European Air Charter
Bulgarian Eagle			BEG	BULGARIAN EAGLE	2017	2019	Subsidiary of Germania
Bulgarian Flying Cargo		FN	BFB		1993	2001	Previously Bulgarian Flying Company Operated Antonov An-12
Bunavad					1927	1930	
BVS Bulgarske Vazdusne Sobstenie					1947	1949	Renamed TABSO. Operated Junkers Ju 52, Lisunov Li-2
Dandy Airlines		ZD	DDD	FLYING DANDY	2002	2004	
East-West European			EWE		1991	1996	
Global Air			GLB; GLJ; GLS		1992	1995	
Hemus Air		DU	HMS	HEMUS AIR	1987	2010	Merged operations into Bulgaria Air
Inter Trans Air			ITT	INTER TRANSAIR	1996	2002	
Jes Air		JX	JES	JES AIR	1992	1993	
Lucky Air		DN	BLF		1990	2000	
Mithras Air					2007	2008	Operated Antonov An-12
Phoenix Air Cargo			PXB	PHOENIX BULGARIA	1993	1994	Operated Antonov An-12
Rila Airlines			RAB	RILA	1999	2003	Operated Antonov An-12
Rose Air			REM		2015	2019	Cargo carrier Previously Air Bright
Scorpion Air			SPN	AIR SKORPIO	1990	2007	
Sigi Air Cargo		BG	BGR		1990	1992	Operated Antonov An-12, Antonov An-22
TABSO					1949	1968	Previously B.V.S. Renamed Balkan Bulgarian Airlines
Tayaran Jet		E8	TJB	ALADIN	2018	2021	
Vega Airlines			VEA	VEGA AIRLINES	1998	2008	Renamed Cargoair
VIA Airways					2017	2019	Successor of Air VIA
Viaggio Air		VM	VOA	VIAGGIO	2003	2007	Bought by and later merged into Hemus Air
Vivant Air			VVI		2002	2006	
Wizz Air Bulgaria		8Z	WVL	WIZZAIR BULGARIA	2005	2011	Operations merged into Wizz Air Hungary

== See also ==
- List of airlines of Bulgaria
- List of airports in Bulgaria
