= Balkan Hemus Group AG =

Balkan Hemus Group AD is an organization, part of the larger holding company Chimimport, that operates the three Bulgarian airlines: Bulgaria Air, Hemus Air, and Viaggio Air (the latter two airlines now defunct), as well as various other aviation activities. Balkan Hemus Group AD has a 20% stake at the Lufthansa Technik Sofia, Lufthansa Technik's fifth European base. The organization joined the three companies together under one name, Bulgaria Air. Balkan Hemus Group has plans to acquire up to 15 new aircraft for the conjoined airline; the first deliveries took place already in 2008. Another major project of the company is the developing of the new Kazan Airport until 2012, where Balkan Hemus Group AD will invest up to 300 million US dollars and later operate it together with Fraport. Also, the company's owner Chimimport has announced it has formed a joint venture with the government of the Republic of Tatarstan to operate the semi-autonomous republic's airline Tatarstan Airlines; the delivery of the first plane already took place, the plane is former Bulgaria air B-737.

In 2003, the name of the group was changed to Bulgarian Aviation Group Plc.
