= Flight 130 =

Flight 130 may refer to:

- Balkan Bulgarian Airlines Flight 130, crashed on 18 January 1971
- Aviogenex Flight 130, crashed on 23 May 1971
- Scandinavian Airlines System Flight 130, hijacked 15–16 September 1972
- Baikal Airlines Flight 130, crashed on 3 January 1994
