= Flight 307 =

Flight 307 may refer to:

- Northwest Orient Airlines Flight 307, crashed on On 7 March 1950
- TAI Flight 307, crashed on 24 September 1959
- Balkan Bulgarian Airlines Flight 307, crashed on 3 March 1973
