= Hemus Air Flight 7081 =

1996 aircraft hijacking

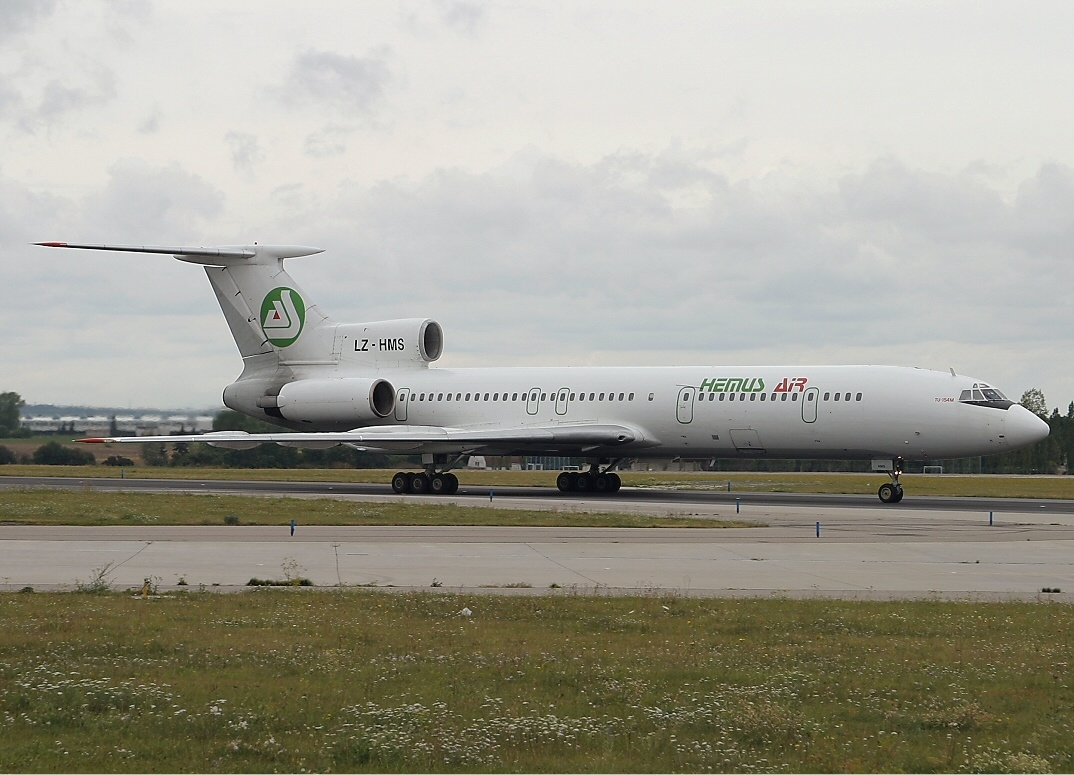
- A Tu-154 of Hemus Air in 2004

Hijacking
- Date: 3 September 1996
- Summary: Hijacking
- Site: Varna, Bulgaria; 60.219°N 11.094°E

Aircraft
- Aircraft type: Tupolev Tu-154
- Operator: Hemus Air
- Flight origin: Beirut International Airport
- Stopover: Varna Airport
- Destination: Oslo Airport, Gardermoen
- Occupants: 158
- Passengers: 150
- Crew: 8
- Fatalities: 0
- Survivors: 158

Hemus Air Flight 7081 was the hijacking of a Tupolev Tu-154 operated by Hemus Air on 3 September 1996. The incident occurred on-route from Beirut International Airport in Lebanon to Varna Airport in Bulgaria. The hijacker, Palestinian Hazem Salah Abdallah, a defector of the Popular Front for the Liberation of Palestine (PFLP), falsely claimed he had explosives on board. The aircraft landed at Varna at 15:15 UTC+2, where the hijacker exchanged the 149 other passengers for fuel. The aircraft continued to Norway with eight crew members and landed at Oslo Airport, Gardermoen at 20:04 UTC+1. Abdullah demanded asylum in Norway and quickly surrendered. No-one was injured in the incident. During the court case, Abdullah claimed that he was insane, but was sentenced to four years in prison. After the court case he claimed he was under orders of PFLP to crash the aircraft in Oslo. He was sent back to Lebanon after he had finished his sentence, in August 1999.

== Hijacking ==
Flight 7081 was a charter flight between Beirut International Airport in Lebanon and Varna Airport in Bulgaria. The Tupolev Tu-154 aircraft was a wet lease flight operated by Balkan Bulgarian Airlines for Hemus Air; it had 150 passengers and 8 crew members. Twenty-two-year-old Abdullah checked into his flight in Beirut without check-in baggage. This arose suspicion with airport security, which questioned why he was travelling on a leisure charter without baggage, but he answered that he always travelled lightly. Fellow passengers described him as timid and nervous and that he did not say a word while on board. The hijacker walked calmly to the toilet where he assembled a facsimile bomb consisting of a cylindrical chocolate box, silver foil, black tape, a switch and small pieces of wire.

At 15:15 Eastern European Time (UTC+2), the hijacker went to the front of the aircraft and forced his way into the cockpit falsely claiming that he had explosives in his left pocket and demanding that the aircraft continue from Varna to Oslo. The aircraft landed at 14:32 at Varna Airport and after the hijacker threatened to detonate his bomb he exchanged the passengers for fuel. The aircraft departed Varna with the crew and hijacker at 18:02, landing at Oslo Gardermoen Airport at 20:04 Central European Time (UTC+1) and was directed to an isolated area to the north of the airport. The police operation was led by Chief of Police of Romerike Police District, Asbjørn Gran, with three representatives from the Bulgarian embassy present. Negotiations with a police negotiator were straight forward; Abdullah's demands were that he be granted a defence attorney and asylum. While the aircraft was covered by the police tactical unit Delta the hijacker left the aircraft with his arms raised at 20:47. The police later found a device that looked like a bomb, but it lacked explosives.

== Aftermath ==
Jan Schjatvet was appointed as the hijacker's defense attorney; he had also worked as defense for two previous hijackings since 1993. He was driven to the police station at Lillestrøm where he was questioned. Gran stated that it was "strange" that the Bulgarian authorities had allowed the aircraft to continue to Norway instead of resolving the issue in Bulgaria, all the time it was a Bulgarian aircraft and crew. It was quickly established that the hijackers only motive was to apply for asylum in Norway and that he had no political motivations. Abdullah stated that he had been forcefully recruited to a Lebanese guerrilla group and that leaving the group would entail a death hunt on him. He had discovered that Lebanese could acquire a visa for Bulgaria, but had not wanted to settle there because of the crime and mafia in the country. He chose Norway because of its participation in the peace talks between Israelis and Palestinians. He was initially given eight weeks of custody.

It was the fourth hijacking involving Norway, the third in three years and the second in which a foreign aircraft was directed to Norway to apply for asylum. The 1993 Aeroflot Flight 3100 had resulted in the three Iranian hijackers be extradited from Norway. The Norwegian Airline Pilots Association stated that Norway had become "hijacker destination number one in Europe" and demanded that the authorities change their policies regarding hijackers. Specifically they wanted Norway to introduce the same policy as Sweden, where the hijackers were sent back to land of origin with the first possible flight. Responsible for security, Kjell Erik Heibek, described the possibility of the hijacker receiving asylum as "insane". The Civil Aviation Administration chose to plan for a designated are at Gardermoen which could be used for hijacked aircraft. In January 1997, the Progress Party proposed that hijackers would be legally prohibited from receiving asylum, but this was not supported by any other parliamentarian parties. Because of Norway's accumulation of experience with hijackings, a pan-Nordic exercise was carried out at Sandefjord Airport, Torp in September 1997.

Abdallah was brought to observation at Dikemark Hospital, without the court-appointed psychiatrists finding that he was insane at the time of the hijacking. He was, however, observed as being periodically psychotic. The court case was carried out by Eidsvoll District Court and started on 16 September. The maximum penalty for hijacking in Norway was 21 years, but the defense attorney stated that his client was insane and argued that he be acquitted. Bulgarian authorities were not interested in following up the case; the court proceedings were not followed by Bulgarian representatives and the four crew members called to witness did not meet.

The accused arrived at the court wearing only underwear, bathing shoes and a crown. Although he admitted to having hijacked the aircraft, he denied criminal liability, due to him being "under the influence of evil powers". He made his statement in Arabic with an interpreter. He stated that he had been forcefully recruited to the Popular Front for the Liberation of Palestine, where he had been brainwashed. He had then seen one of his friends die, upon which he had heard voices. Both God and the Devil had spoken to him and for a while he had slept at graveyards where he had heard the screaming of the dead. Before departing he had drunk four beers and was search eight times at the airport.

The court found Abdullah guilty and found no extenuation and sentenced him to four years of prison. The court pointed out that the hijacking was well prepared and sly and that the hijacker had retained control in a stressed situation. The Ministry of Justice decided on 28 April 1999 to return him to Lebanon, but this was not possible on 12 July, when he was released from prison. He was therefore detained in custody until he could be sent out. He was returned to Lebanon in August, escorted by police officers. At the terminal at Vienna International Airport he attempted to flee, but was quickly detained by Norwegian and Austrian police. This caused the airline to deny to take him on the flight and separate aircraft had to be chartered. He was immediately detained by Lebanese police when he arrived there. In December 1997 Abdullah claimed that he had made up the defection plan and that he was acting under orders of PFLP to crash the aircraft into Oslo as a protest against the Oslo Accords and the thriving peace process. He stated that he had abandoned the plan because "he was no terrorist".
