= 1984 Balkan Bulgarian Tupolev Tu-134 crash =

Aviation accident in Bulgaria

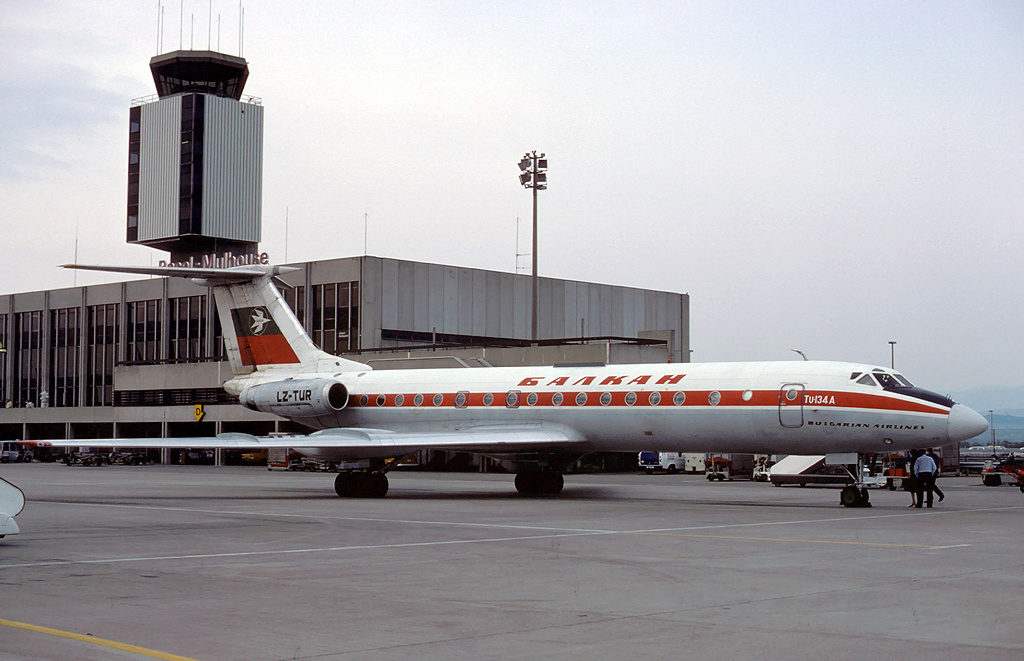
- LZ-TUR, the Tupolev Tu-134 involved in the crash, pictured in 1980

Accident
- Date: 10 January 1984
- Summary: Pilot error in bad weather
- Site: Near Sofia Vrazhdebna Airport, Sofia, Bulgaria; 42°41′33″N 23°28′23″E

Aircraft
- Aircraft type: Tupolev Tu-134
- Operator: Balkan Bulgarian Airlines
- Registration: LZ-TUR
- Flight origin: Berlin Schönefeld Airport, Schönefeld, East Germany
- Destination: Sofia Vrazhdebna Airport, Sofia, Bulgaria
- Passengers: 45
- Crew: 5
- Fatalities: 50
- Survivors: 0

The 1984 Balkan Bulgarian Tupolev Tu-134 crash occurred on 10 January 1984 when a Balkan Bulgarian Airlines Tupolev Tu-134 airliner crashed on an international flight from Berlin Schönefeld Airport in Schönefeld, East Germany, to Sofia Airport in Sofia, Bulgaria. All 50 on board were killed.

While on approach to Sofia Airport in heavy snow, the crew failed to make visual contact with the ground as they descended below decision altitude. The crew attempted to overshoot for an altitude of 80 to 100 metres (260 to 330 ft), but the aircraft hit a power line and crashed 4 kilometres (2.5 mi; 2.2 nmi) from the runway into a forest. The aircraft was destroyed and there were no survivors.

== Passengers ==
Thirty-eight passengers and the crew were Bulgarians, the other seven on the flight were East Germans.
