= Solenta Aviation =

Airline of Africa

IATA	ICAO	Call sign
-	SET	SOLENTA
- Founded: 2002
- Operating bases: OR Tambo International Airport; Libreville International Airport; Oued Irara–Krim Belkacem Airport
- Fleet size: 9
- Headquarters: Johannesburg, South Africa
- Website: solenta.com

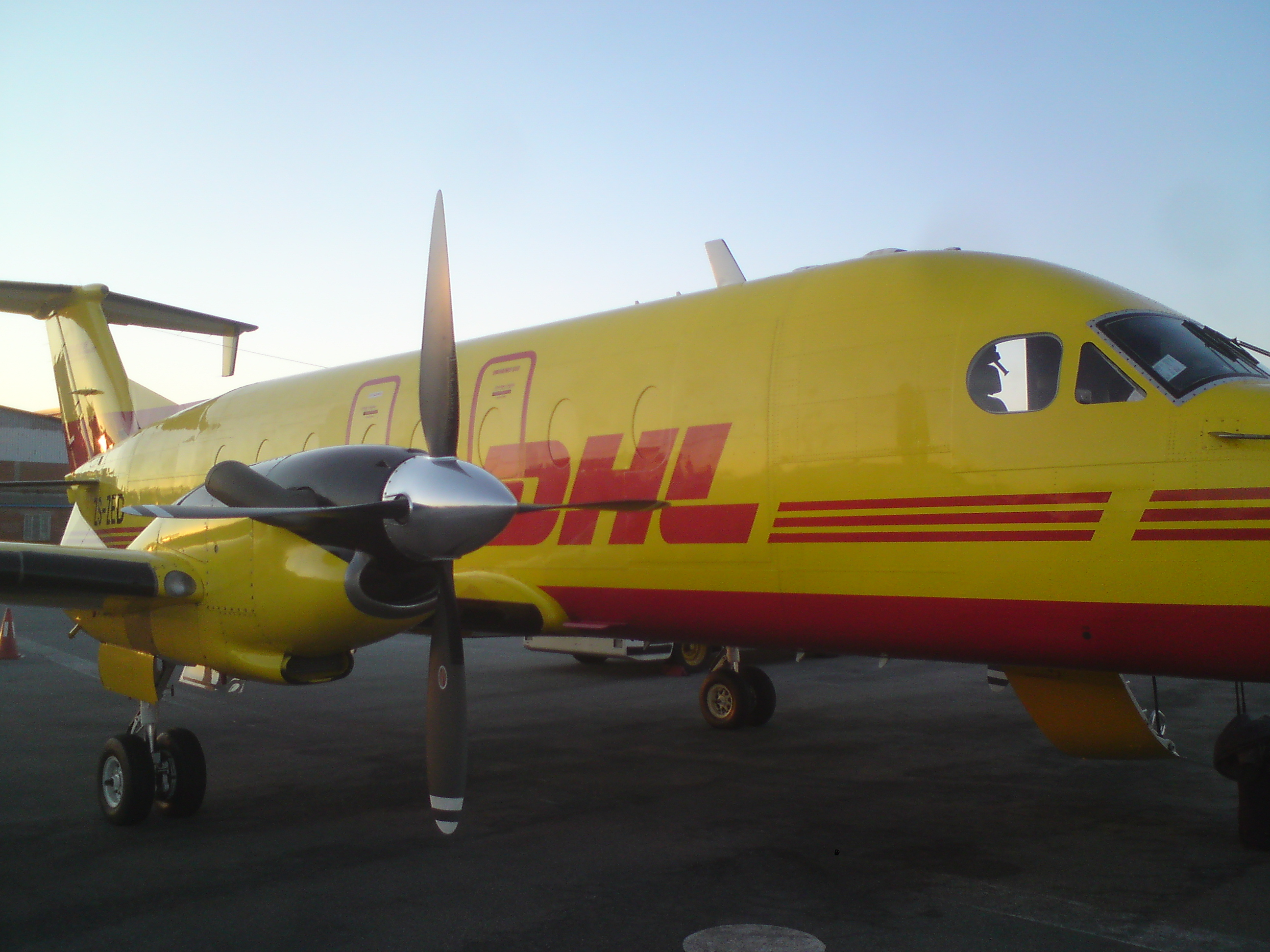
Many Solenta Aviation aircraft feature the DHL logo and livery.

Solenta Aviation is an airline based in Johannesburg, South Africa, with its maintenance base at OR Tambo International Airport. The company was founded in 2000 and operates cargo flights on regional routes throughout the Sub-Saharan Africa on behalf of DHL Aviation. Solenta Aviation also operates extensively for the oil and gas industry ("OGP"), offering passenger charter, cargo and aircraft lease services.

== Operations ==
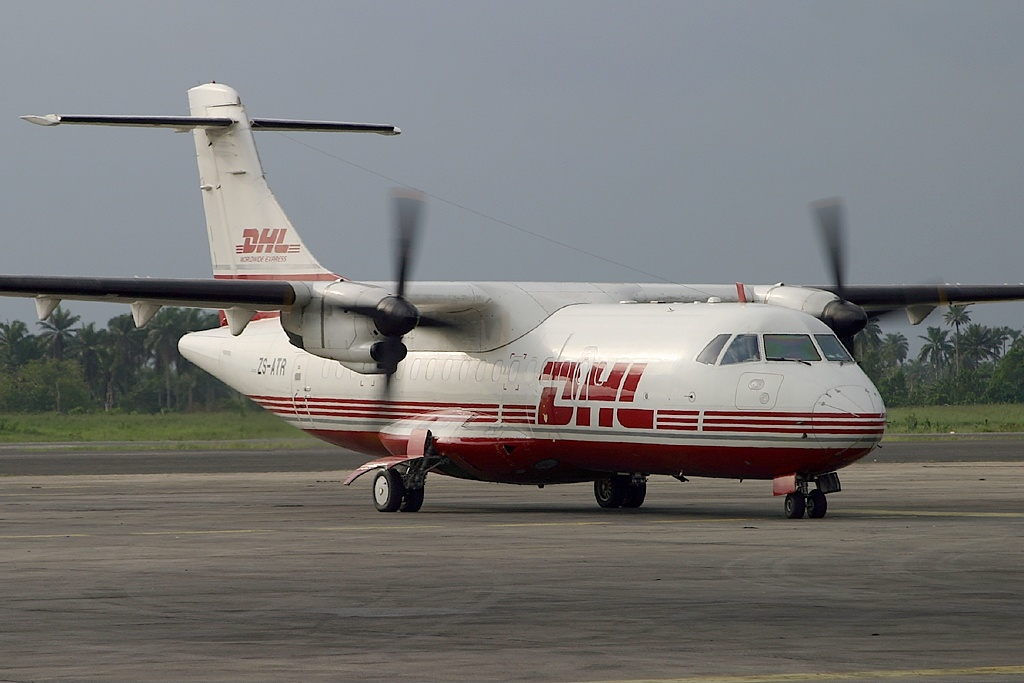
A Solenta Aviation ATR 42 in DHL colors at Port Harcourt International Airport in 2005.

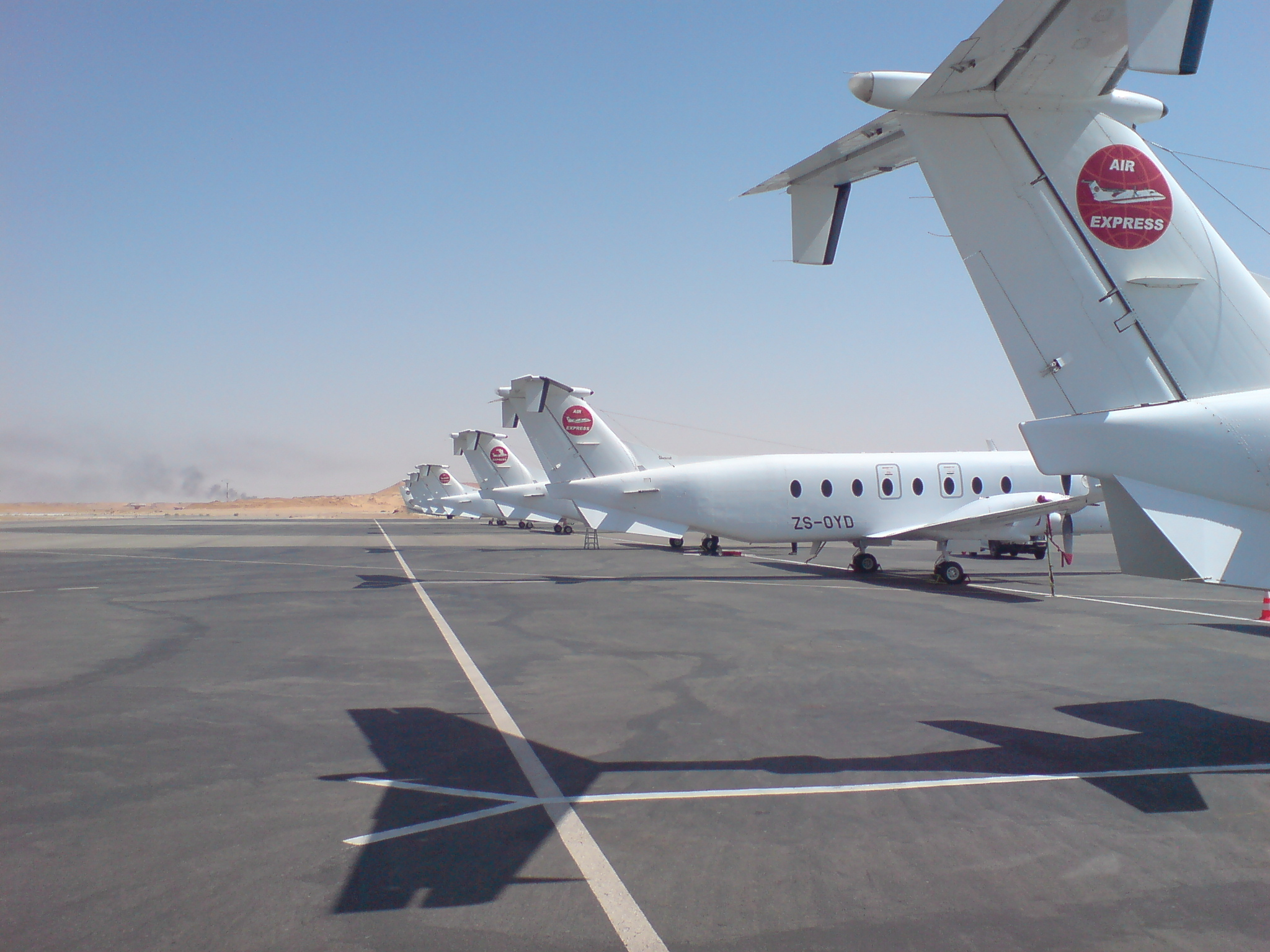
Beech 1900Ds on the flight line in Hassi Messaoud, operated by Solenta for Air Express Algeria

Solenta Aviation has adopted a de-centralised business model, thus being able to offer flexible short-haul cargo flights. From its home and maintenance base at OR Tambo International Airport, it operates a number of DHL flights on regional routes to Mozambique, Zambia and Zimbabwe using a fleet of ATR 42 and Cessna 208 Caravan cargo aircraft.

There are several subsidiaries under separate airline licenses:

- In 2006, Solenta Aviation Gabon was set up, with its headquarters at Libreville and operating out of Libreville International Airport, using one ATR 42 and one Beechcraft 1900. As of July 2026 the fleet comprises 2 ATR 72-500F
- Solenta Aviation Côte d'Ivoire is based in Abidjan and operates one ATR 72-200F as of July 2026 It previously operated two ATR 42 aircraft for DHL Worldwide Express.
- Solenta Aviation Kenya Ltd. operates two cargo-configured Cessna 208 Caravan out of Jomo Kenyatta International Airport in Nairobi for DHL flights and aircraft lease services.
- Solenta Aviation Zimbabwe operates three Cessna 208 Caravan out of Harare International Airport linking Harare, Kariba, Bumi Hills, Hwange and Victoria Falls.
- Solenta Aviation Mozambique operates 1 ATR 42-300 and 2 Embraer ERJ 145 (as of August 2019).

Further aircraft of Solenta Aviation are based and operated out of several other airports, including:

- Three Beechcraft 1900 are stationed at Accra International Airport in Accra, Ghana for passenger flights for the oil and tourism industries as well as on-demand charters.
- In Erbil, Iraq, one Beechcraft 1900 is based at Erbil International Airport mostly for humanitarian aid missions.
- In Conakry, Guinea, one Beechcraft 1900 is based at Conakry International Airport operated on behalf of a mining company.
- One Beechcraft 1900 is operated for the International Committee of the Red Cross mission in Kabul, Afghanistan.
- According to Solenta, at one time another seven Beechcraft 1900Ds were operated on behalf of Air Express Algeria out of Oued Irara – Krim Belkacem Airport in Hassi Messaoud, Algeria.
- One Beechcraft 1900 is operated for the International Committee of the Red Cross mission in Peshawar, Pakistan.
- Two Beechcraft 1900 are operating a network of DHL routes in Zambia and Zimbabwe out of Johannesburg International Airport.
- One ATR 42 is based at Lomé-Tokoin Airport in Lomé, Togo for DHL cargo flights throughout West Africa.
- Two ERJ 145s are operated for 2 oil companies out of Johannesburg International Airport.
- In March 2026 FastJet Group was exploring the potential West Africa expansion of Solenta Aviation. By using its existing air operator certificates (AOCs) in Gabon and Côte d'Ivoire. Group strategy director Julian Edmunds stated that the two markets would be evaluated if Fastjet proceeds with expanding its franchise model into the region.

== Fleet ==
=== Current fleet ===
As of August 2025, Solenta Aviation operates the following aircraft:

Solenta Aviation fleet
Aircraft	In Service	Notes
ATR 42-500	1	
ATR 72-500	4	
Beechcraft 1900D	3	
Embraer ERJ 135LR	1	
Total	9	

=== Former fleet ===
The Solenta Aviation fleet previously included the following aircraft:

- 1 ATR 42-300
- 1 ATR 42-300F
- 4 ATR 42-500
- 3 ATR 72-600
- 3 ATR 72-201F
- 1 ATR 72-212F
- 1 ATR 72-202F
- 2 ATR 72-212A

== Accidents and incidents ==
On 6 June 2011 at 10:25 local time, an Antonov An-26 (registered TR-LII) ditched into the Gulf of Guinea 2.3 kilometres off Libreville, Gabon. The aircraft was operated by Scorpion Air, a Bulgarian company. It had been on Flight 122A for DHL Aviation from Port Gentil to Libreville. The three crew members and one passenger on board received only minor injuries. Prior to the ditching, they had reported hydraulic problems; eyewitness reports suggest that an engine failure may have occurred. As a consequence, the Gabonese government declared a temporary ban on aircraft of the types Antonov An-12, An-24 and An-26 in the country, pending the outcome of the investigation into the cause for the crash.
