= Inter Trans Air =

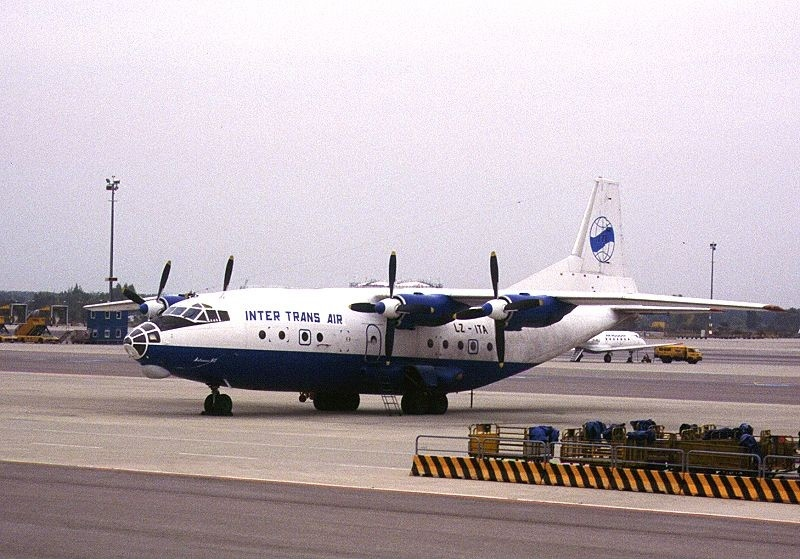
- Antonov An-12BP
IATA	ICAO	Call sign
—	ITT	INTER TRANSAIR
- Founded: 1996
- Ceased operations: 2002
- Headquarters: Sofia, Bulgaria

Inter Trans Air was a cargo airline based in Sofia, Bulgaria. It was established in 1996 but ceased all operations in 2002.

== Code data ==
- ICAO Code: ITT

== Fleet ==
The Inter Trans Air fleet consisted of 2 Antonov An-12BP aircraft (at January 2005).
