= Tayaranjet =

Tayaran Jet Таяран Джет
IATA	ICAO	Call sign
E8	TJB	ALADIN
- Founded: 2017
- Commenced operations: 2018
- Ceased operations: 26 November 2021
- Hubs: Trapani–Birgi Airport
- Fleet size: 2
- Destinations: 5
- Headquarters: Sofia, Bulgaria
- Key people: Nevena Zlatanova (CEO)
- Website: www.tayaranjet.com

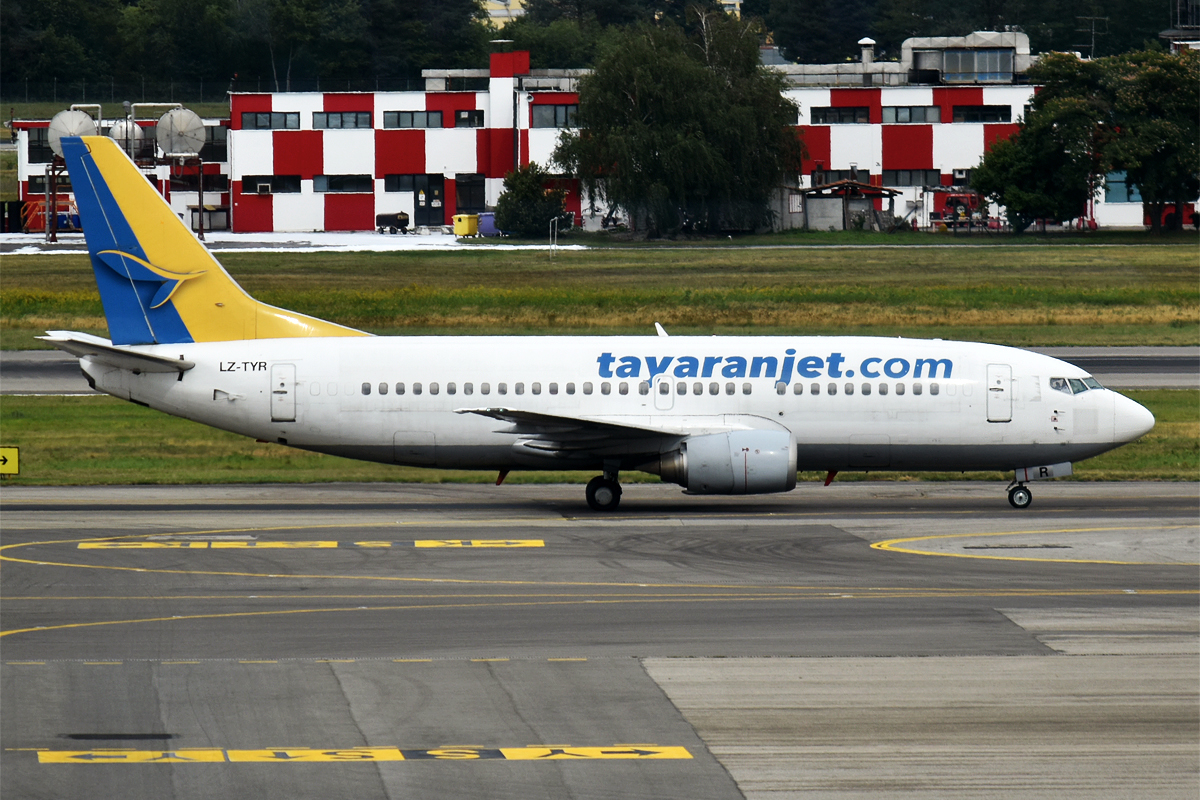
Boeing 737-300 at Milan Malpensa Airport, Italy in 2019.

Tayaran Jet Jsc. (Bulgarian: Таяран Джет) was an airline based in Sofia, Bulgaria. It operated both charter services as well as low-cost flights from Trapani, Italy.

== History ==
Founded in 2017, Tayaran Jet initially launched flights in August 2018 as a charter airline. In 2020, the airline began low-cost flights.

== Destinations ==
Tayaran Jet operated scheduled services to the following destinations (as of August 2021):

Country	City	Airport	Notes
Italy	Ancona	Marche Airport	
Italy	Milan	Milan Linate Airport	
Italy	Trapani	Trapani–Birgi Airport	Hub
Italy	Trieste	Trieste – Friuli Venezia Giulia Airport	
Italy	Perugia	Perugia San Francesco d'Assisi – Umbria International Airport	
