= Balkan Bulgarian Airlines Flight 307 =

1973 aviation accident in the Soviet Union

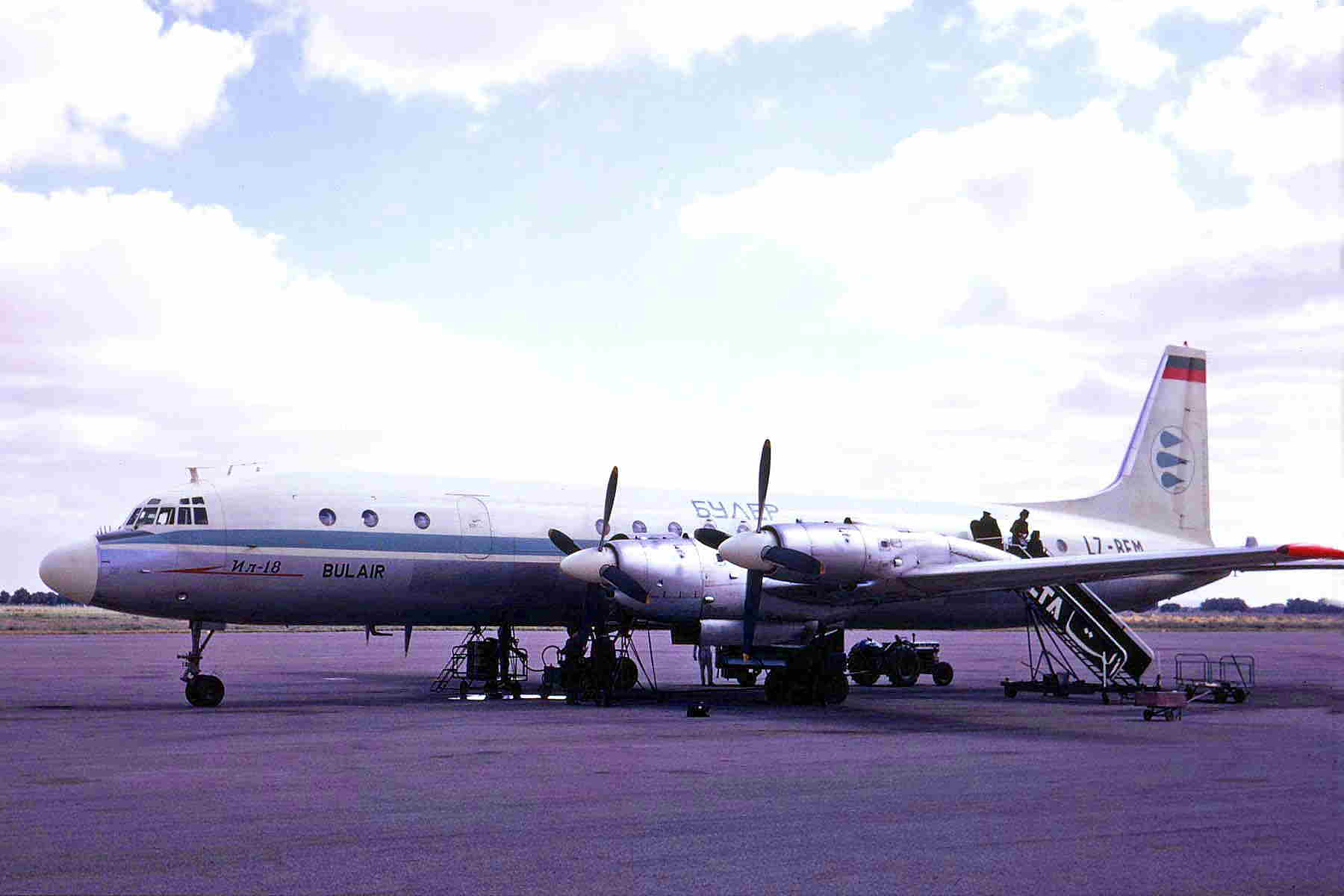
- LZ-BEM, the accident aircraft

Accident
- Date: 3 March 1973
- Summary: Atmospheric icing
- Site: Near Skhodnya, Moscow Oblast, Soviet Union

Aircraft
- Aircraft type: Ilyushin Il-18
- Operator: Balkan Bulgarian Airlines
- Registration: LZ-BEM
- Flight origin: Sofia-Vrazhdebna Airport, Sofia, Bulgaria
- Destination: Sheremetyevo International Airport, Moscow, Soviet Union
- Passengers: 17
- Crew: 8
- Fatalities: 25
- Survivors: 0

Balkan Bulgarian Airlines Flight 307 was a scheduled international passenger flight from Sofia to Moscow that crashed on its final approach to the Sheremetyevo Airport in Moscow on March 3, 1973. All 25 passengers and crew on board were killed in the crash.

== Aircraft ==
The aircraft involved was an Ilyushin Il-18V with the registration LZ-BEM. It first flew in 1962.

== Accident ==
Flight 307 took off from Sofia-Vrazhdebna Airport at 6:13 GMT with seventeen passengers and eight crew members on board. (Note: It was also reported at the time that there were eighteen passengers and a crew of seven on board.) The passengers included eight Bulgarians, six Soviets, one Vietnamese, one Japanese, and one Cuban.

At the time the instrument landing system at Sheremetyevo International Airport was not working. The crew made contact with the Sheremetyevo controller at 12:27:53 local time and was cleared for a straight-in approach to Runway 07, however a missed approach was carried out. The aircraft carried out a second approach, but while descending along the glide path, the Il-18 lost altitude, went into a nosedive, and crashed at 12:45:50 local time (9:45:50 GMT). The aircraft struck the ground 4,330 m (14,210 ft) from the runway threshold. All occupants on board were killed in the accident.

== Cause ==
The investigation conducted by the Ministry of Civil Aviation determined the probable cause to be a combination of the factors: icing of the stabilizer, a pitch maneuver to correct a deviation from the glide path, and extension of the flaps which prevented a recovery from the nosedive. The de-icing system was destroyed and could not be inspected.
