= Balkan Bulgarian Airlines Flight 130 =

1971 aviation accident

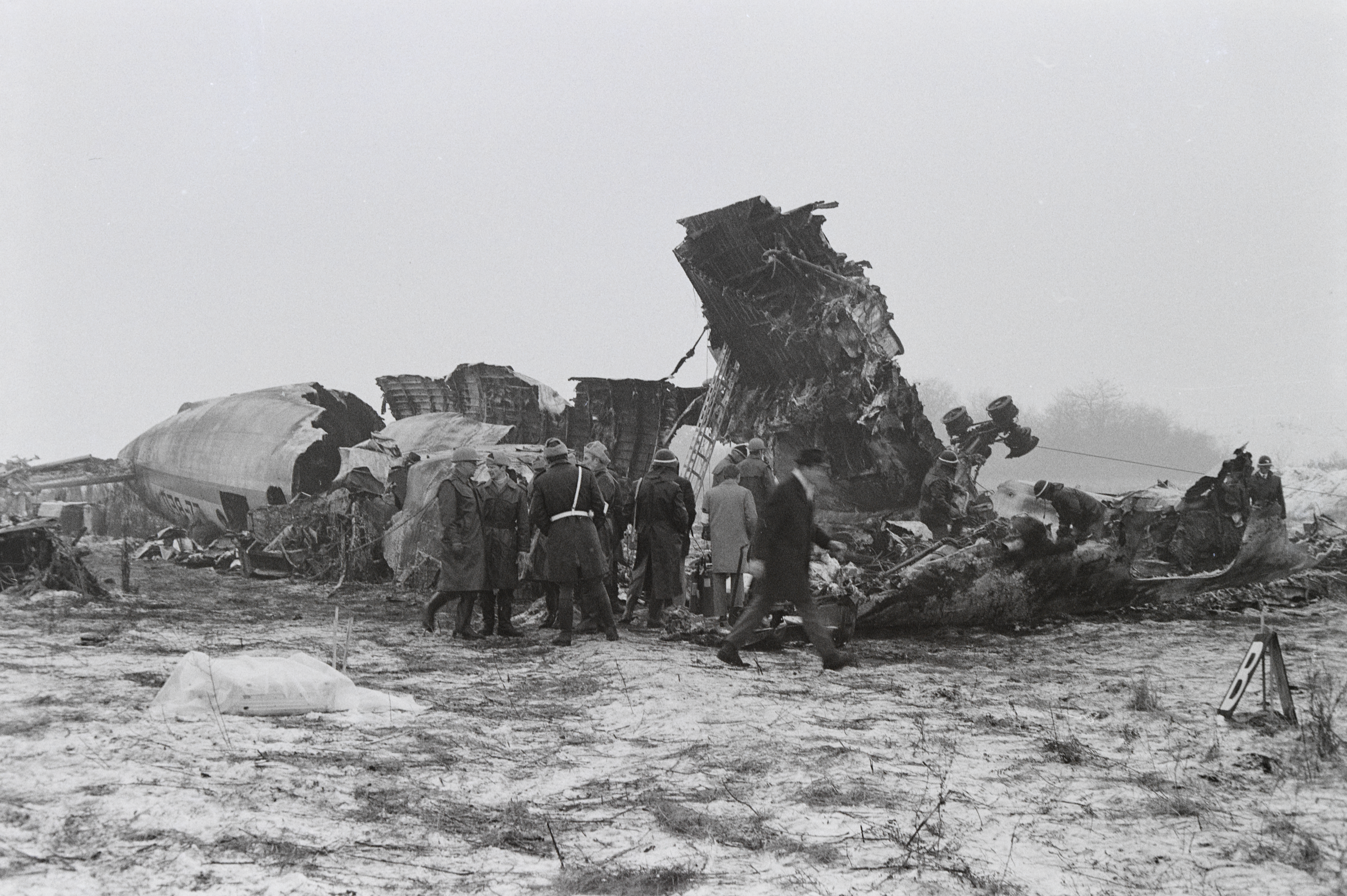
- Wreckage of LZ-BED after the accident

Accident
- Date: 18 January 1971
- Summary: Controlled flight into terrain
- Site: 0.7 km (0.43 mi; 0.38 nmi) north of Zurich Airport, Switzerland

Aircraft
- Aircraft type: Ilyushin Il-18D
- Operator: Balkan Bulgarian Airlines
- Registration: LZ-BED
- Flight origin: Paris–Le Bourget Airport, Paris, France
- Stopover: Zurich Airport, Zurich, Switzerland
- Destination: Sofia Airport, Sofia, Bulgaria
- Occupants: 47
- Passengers: 39
- Crew: 8
- Fatalities: 45
- Survivors: 2

Balkan Bulgarian Airlines Flight 130 was a scheduled passenger flight from Paris–Le Bourget Airport to Sofia Airport with a stopover in Zurich that, on 18 January 1971, crashed while on approach to Zurich Airport, killing 38 of the 39 passengers and 7 of the 8 crew members.

== Aircraft ==
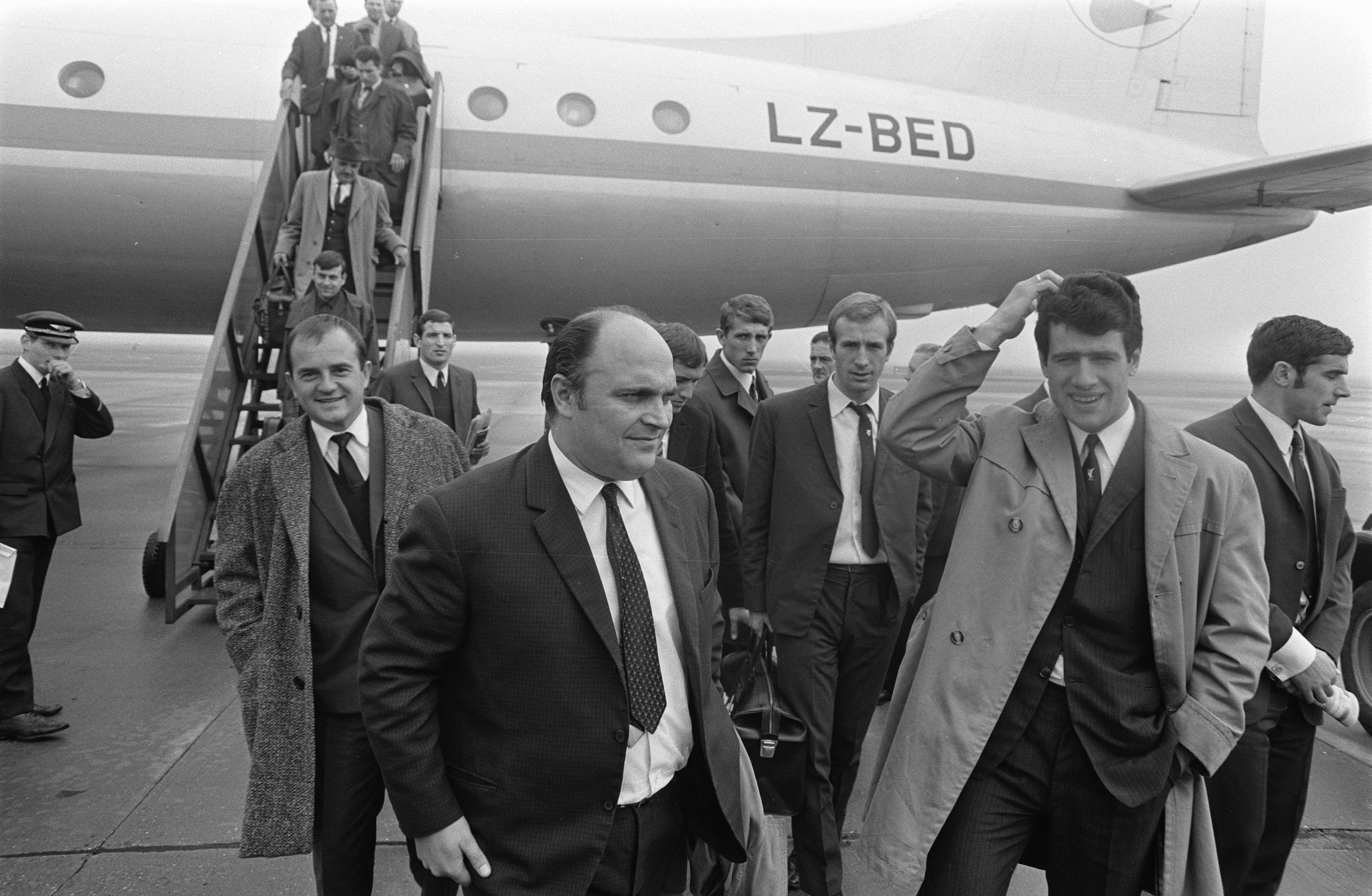
LZ-BED being used to transport the Bulgarian football team, 1969

The accident aircraft was an Ilyushin Il-18D with factory number 186009002 and serial number 090-02. It was manufactured and first flew in 1966, flying for TABSO until 1968, when it was transferred to Bulair.

The Il-18 was inspected two days before the accident. By the time of the crash, the aircraft was considered airworthy, having logged 8,622 flight hours and 3,136 pressurisation cycles. There were eight crew members: a captain, a co-pilot, a navigator, a flight engineer, a radio operator, a trainee, and two flight attendants. The captain was Vladimir Vladov.

== Accident ==
Flight 130 departed Paris in the afternoon and climbed to its assigned altitude. The flight planned to bypass its planned stop in Zurich due to ground fog, but during the flight, a favorable weather forecast in Zurich led the captain to make the stop to pick up an additional ten passengers. The air traffic controller cleared the flight for landing. They initiated approach in bad conditions. On final approach, the crew noticed the plane was off-course and tried to correct; however at 15:49, the left wingtip and undercarriage struck the ground. The Il-18 ended up in flames 700 m (2,300 ft) short of the runway. The crash destroyed the aircraft.

Nationalities
Nationality	Crew	Passengers
West Germany		14
Bulgaria	8	4
France		9
Syria		4
Lebanon		2
Brazil		1
Netherlands		1
Argentina		1
Austria		1
Finland		1
United Kingdom		1
Total	8	39

== Victims ==
Out of the occupants, 14 were West German, 12 were Bulgarian (including the eight crew members), nine were French, four were Syrian, two were Lebanese, one was Brazilian, one was Dutch, one was Argentinian, one was Austrian, one was Finnish, and one was British. Out of the 47 occupants, only two survived, those being a 12-year-old boy and Captain Vladov. Most people died from the post-crash fire and smoke.

== Investigation ==
The crash was investigated in Switzerland. The black box was significantly damaged and no data could be extracted. An interview with Captain Vladov stated that five years of investigation could not establish a cause. However, other sources state that the investigation concluded that the crew failed to follow published procedures while initiating an ILS approach on runway 16 which led to the Il-18 passing below the minimum descent altitude. The thick fog was also considered a contributing factor.
