= Scorpion Air =

Bulgarian general aviation company

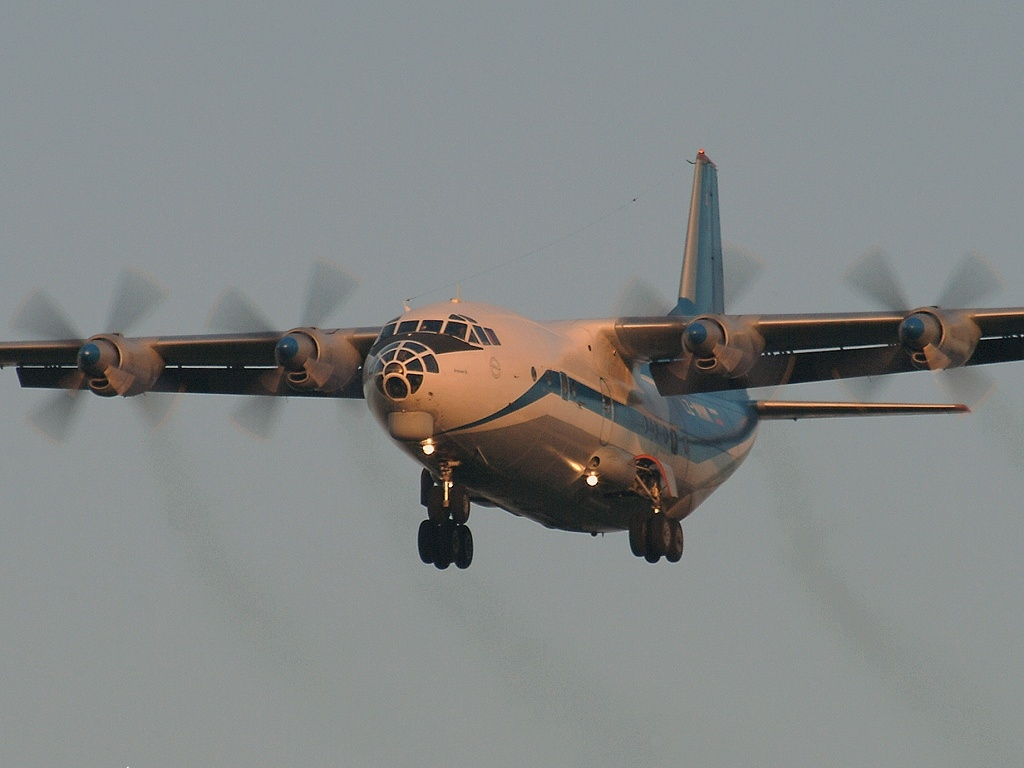
- Antonov An-12
IATA	ICAO	Call sign
-	SPN	AIR SKORPIO
- Founded: 1990
- Ceased operations: 2007
- Headquarters: Sofia, Bulgaria

Scorpion Air was an airline based in Sofia, Bulgaria. It was established in 1990 and was a general aviation company operating domestic and international charter services using helicopters and fixed-wing aircraft. Its operating certificate was revoked on 21 June 2007, however it may have still continued operations years after, since on 14 June 2011, Paul Hurst, at the time the managing director of Solenta Aviation, stated in the PPRuNE forum that Scorpion Air operated all of Solenta Aviation's Antonov fleet, one them being involved in the Solenta Aviation Gabon Flight 122A crash.

== Code data ==
- ICAO Code: SPN
- Callsign: AIR SKORPIO

== Fleet ==
- Antonov An-12
- Kamov Ka-32AO
- Mil Mi-8
- Mil Mi-26T
