= Bulgaria Air =

Flag carrier of Bulgaria

Bulgaria Air България Еър

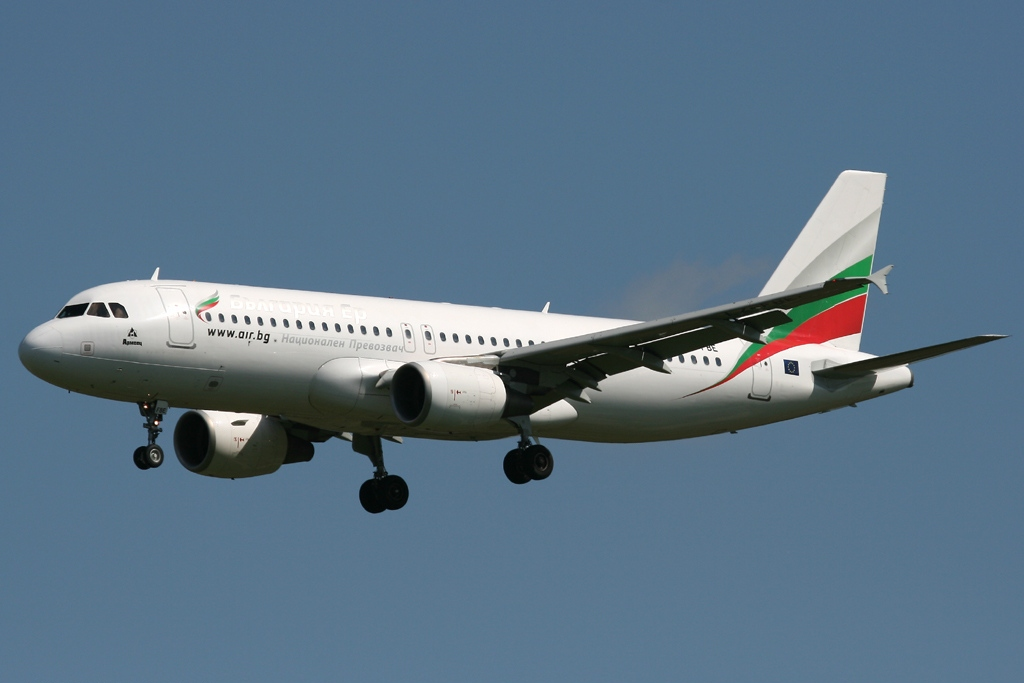
- Airbus A320-200
IATA	ICAO	Call sign
FB	LZB	FLYING BULGARIA
- Founded: November 2002; 24 years ago
- Commenced operations: 4 December 2002; 23 years ago
- Hubs: Sofia
- Focus cities: Burgas; Varna
- Frequent-flyer program: FLY MORE
- Subsidiaries: Bul Air
- Fleet size: 17
- Destinations: 26
- Headquarters: Sofia, Bulgaria
- Key people: Yanko Georgiev (CEO); Hristo Todorov (CEO)
- Revenue: ▲€ 195.4 million (2024)
- Operating income: ▲€23.85 million (2024)
- Net income: ▲€4.57 million (2024)
- Profit: ▲€4.61 million (2024)
- Total assets: ▲€548 million (2024)
- Total equity: ▲€88.53 million (2024)
- Employees: ▲363 (2024)
- Website: www.air.bg/en

Bulgaria Air (Bulgarian: България Еър) is the flag carrier airline of Bulgaria, with its headquarters at Vasil Levski Sofia Airport in Sofia. The company is owned by Chimimport AD and is a leader in terms of local market share. The airline operates short and medium-haul aircraft to destinations in Europe and the Middle East. Focus cities in Bulgaria are Burgas and Varna. In 2018, the company carried a total of 1.267 million passengers on 5,995 flights.

== History ==
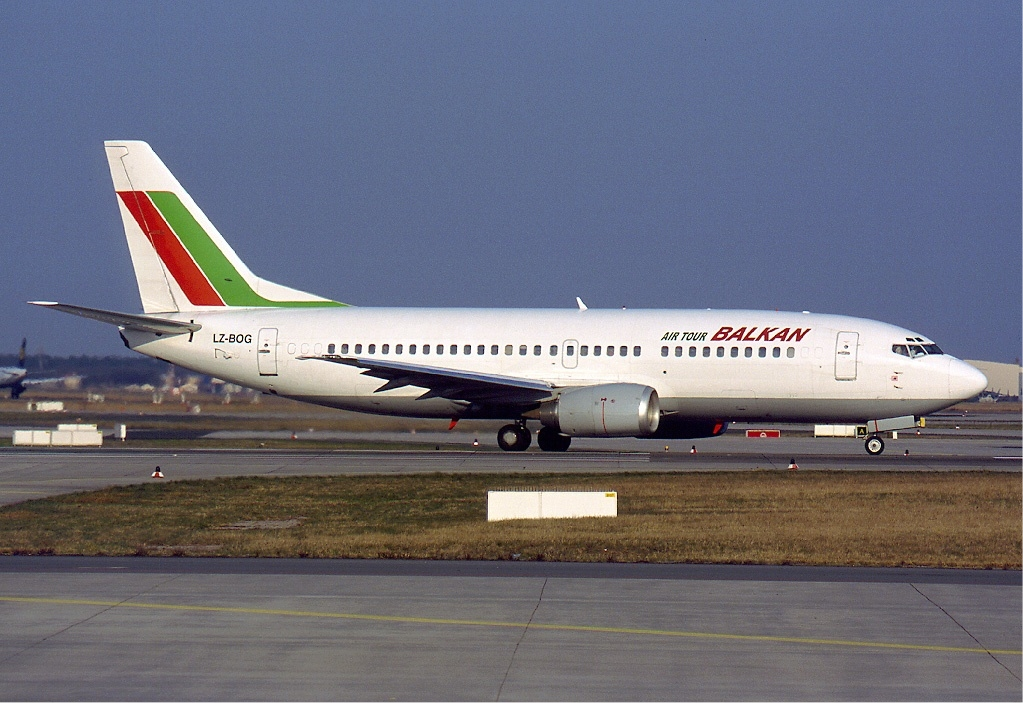
Balkan Air Tour Boeing 737-300

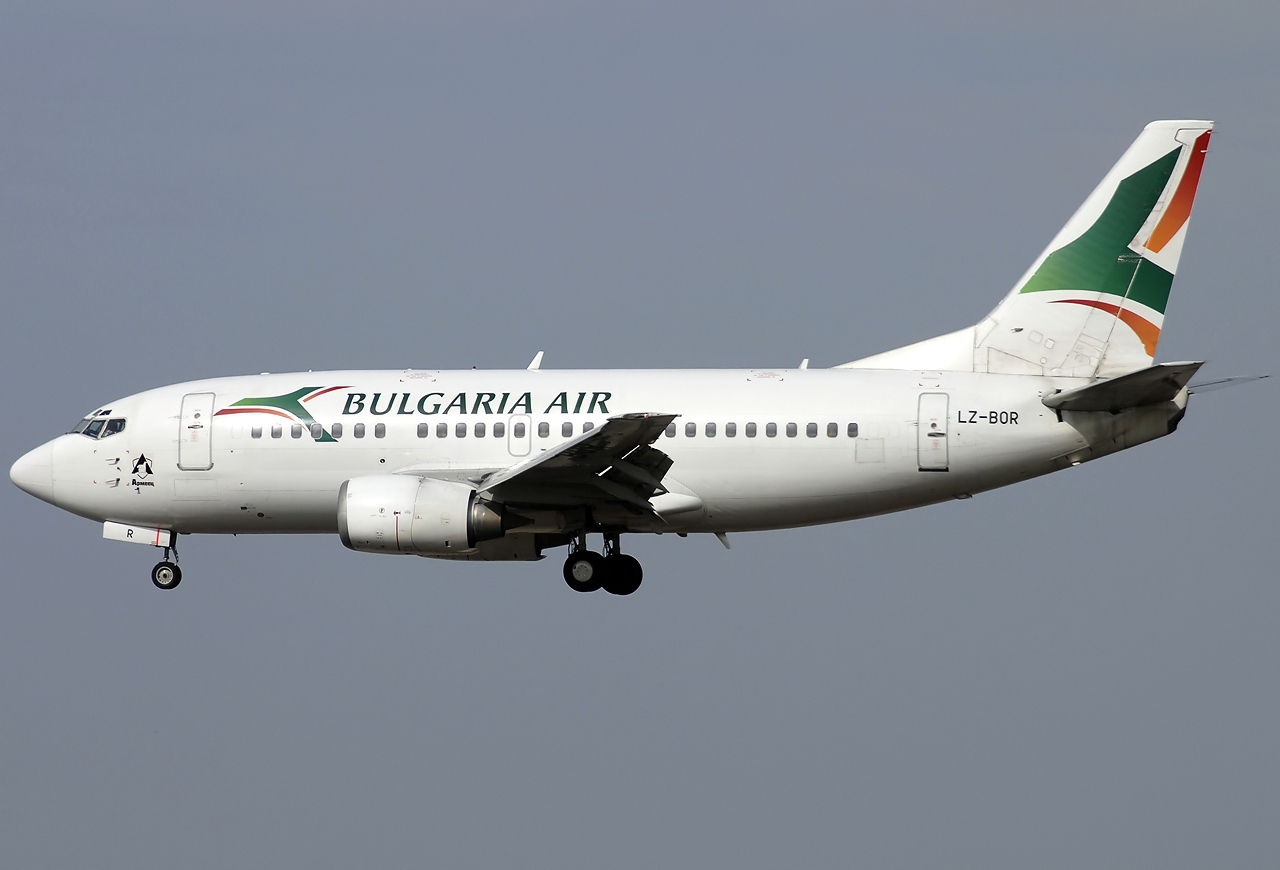
Boeing 737-500

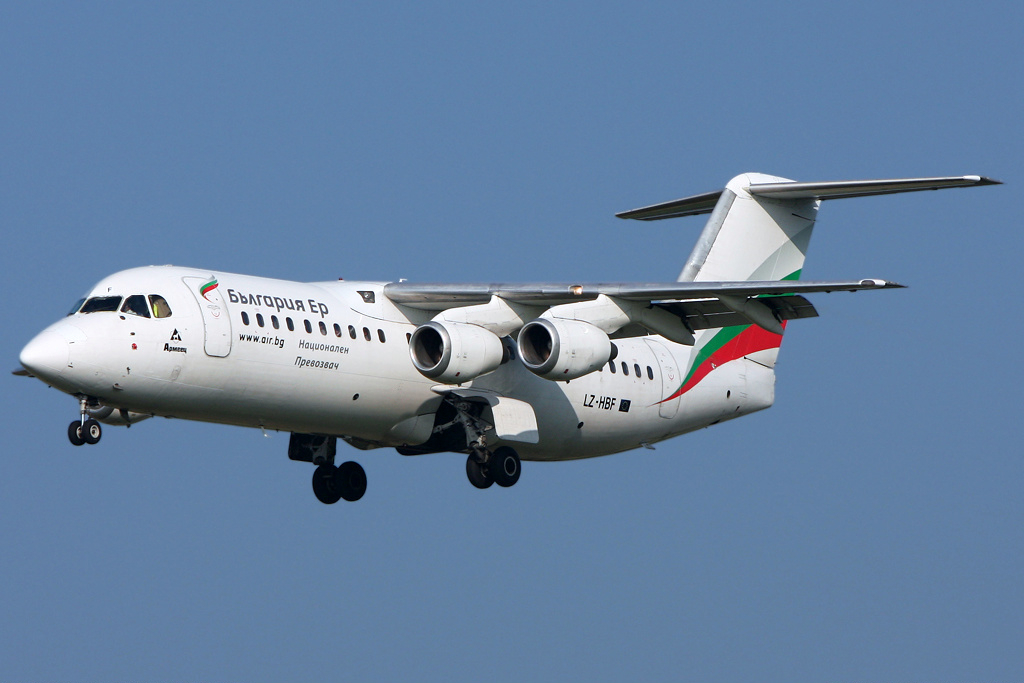
BAe 146-300 in 2011

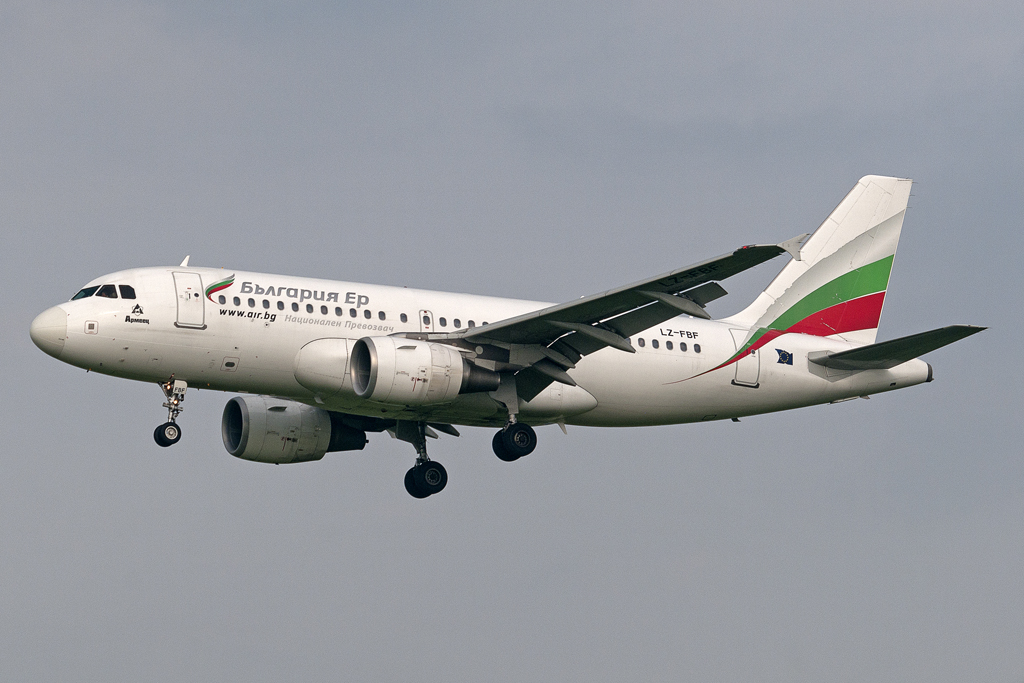
Airbus A319

The airline was established in 2002 as a successor to the insolvent Balkan Bulgarian Airlines and commenced operations on 4 December that year. By order of the Minister of Transport and Communications, it was declared the national flag carrier in November 2002. Bulgaria Air began operations using the name Balkan Air Tour. The airline was known by that name for just a short period of time. The name Bulgaria Air and the initial logo were determined in a public competition. Bulgaria Air was privatised in 2006. Although it was rumoured that the government wanted to sell the carrier to a major foreign investor, a group of locally owned companies (led by Hemus Air) emerged as the buyer, with Italian airline Air One being the only other contender. Hemus Air reportedly paid €6.6 million and promised to invest a further €86 million over the next five years. Since then, all flights and operations of Hemus Air and its subsidiary Viaggio Air are under the name and management of the merged company, Bulgaria Air.

In November 2008, Bulgaria Air became a full member of the International Air Transport Association (IATA). In mid 2011, Bulgaria Air announced that they had completed a thorough analysis of its routes and had decided to acquire the new Embraer E190 aircraft. The delivery of the first new Embraer E190 aircraft occurred in March 2012. In February 2020, the airline's CEO Yanko Georgiev stated that the carrier was in talks with two aircraft manufacturers to place an order for a single-aisle jet. They plan to order 5-6 of these aircraft to modernise their fleet and to extend their network with more aircraft available.

== Corporate affairs ==
=== Bul Air ===
Bul Air is the charter brand of Bulgaria Air. The company was founded in 1954, but after merging with the Bulgarian national carrier, TABSO became part of Balkan Bulgarian Airlines. In 2015, the company was revived by Bulgaria Air.

=== Frequent flyer program ===
Fly More is the name of the Bulgaria Air frequent flyer program. There are three levels of membership: Basic, Silver and Gold Privilege. Central Cooperative Bank issues Visa Classic and Visa Gold co-branded credit cards with Bulgaria Air.

=== Livery ===
In November 2002, public contests were held in Bulgaria to determine a name and logo for the new airline. Thousands of people showed their creativity and voiced their opinions. After searching through the submissions, the name and logo were chosen. The design was used for about four years, until 2006, when an improved, more professional design was introduced. After the full fleet integration of Hemus Air and Viaggio Air, a new livery had to be developed once again. In mid 2010, the first Bulgaria Air Airbus A319 was rolled out wearing the finalised colour scheme.

=== Catering ===
In 2010, Bulgaria Air and LSG Sky Chefs created a new airline catering company called Silver Wings. The total investment for Bulgaria Air totaled $1.3 million. Future investment plans envision a new canteen to serve the airport staff at Vasil Levski Sofia Airport.

=== Media ===
Bulgaria On Air: The In-Flight Magazine - Bulgaria Air's in-flight magazine. Its first edition was in 2003. In April 2011, the in-flight magazine was extended with an edition which is distributed in some hotels and shopping centres, Bulgaria On Air: The Business Magazine.

=== ACMI leasing ===
Bulgaria Air is currently operating wet leases (provides an aircraft, complete crew, maintenance, and insurance) for Air Serbia.

== Destinations ==
Bulgaria Air operates 21 routes from Vasil Levski Sofia Airport, including two domestic routes to Burgas and Varna. In June 2024, the airline begin seasonal service from Varna to Frankfurt and Prague.

=== Codeshare agreements ===
Bulgaria Air has codeshare agreements with the following airlines:

- Aegean Airlines
- Air France
- Air Serbia
- airBaltic
- Cyprus Airways
- Iberia
- ITA Airways
- KLM
- TAROM
- Qatar Airways
- Windrose Airlines

=== Interline agreements ===
Bulgaria Air has special interline agreements with the following airlines:

- Air Europa
- American Airlines
- Brussels Airlines
- Emirates
- Hahn Air
- Finnair
- LATAM Brasil
- Virgin Atlantic

=== Charter flights ===
Bulgaria Air performs charter flights for over 60 leading tour operators, air transport brokers, airlines, and other companies of the aviation and tourist industries. During the summer season, the airline mainly operates flights from Burgas and Varna airports to destinations in Germany, Israel, Lebanon, and Poland. In addition, the company operates charter flights from Sofia Airport to popular holiday destinations in Egypt, Greece, Italy, Mauritius, Spain, Tunisia, and Turkey.

== Fleet ==
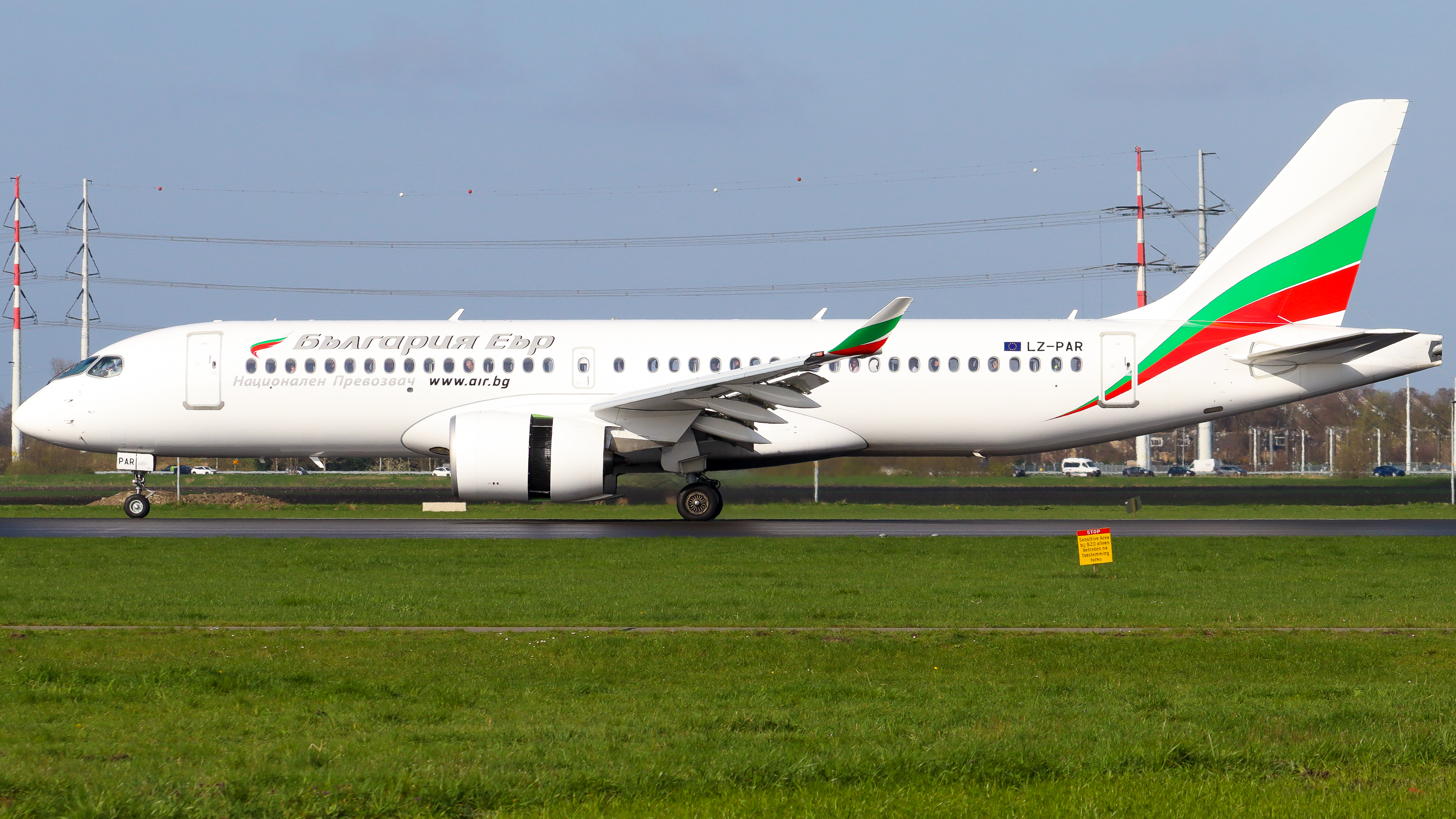
Airbus A220-300

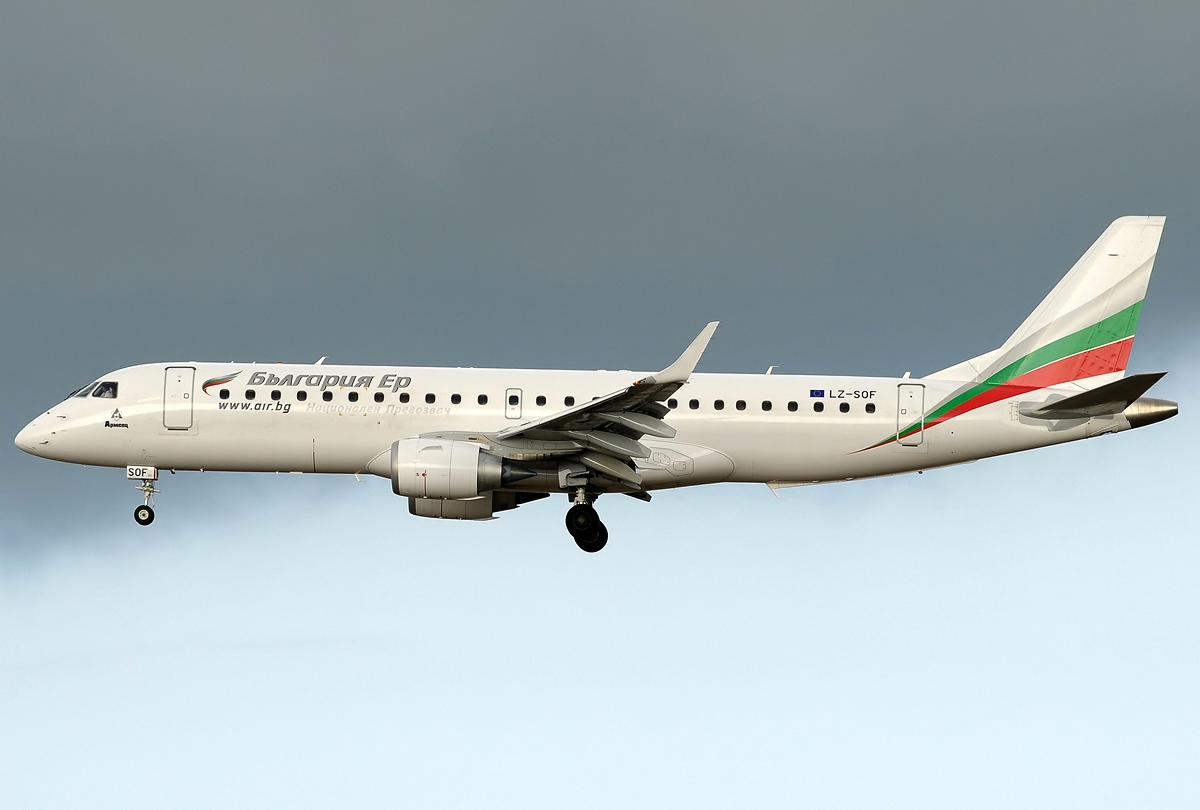
Embraer E190

As of August 2025, Bulgaria Air operates the following aircraft:

Bulgaria Air fleet
Aircraft	In Service	Orders	Passengers			Notes
Aircraft	In Service	Orders	J	Y	Total	Notes
Airbus A220-100	2	—	8	110	118	
Airbus A220-300	5	—	8	135	143	
Airbus A319-100	1	—	8	132	140	
Airbus A320-200	5	—	10	150	160	
Airbus A320-200	5	—	8	156	164	
Airbus A320-200	5	—	—	180	180	
Embraer E190	4	—	8	100	108	
Total	17	—				

=== Historical fleet ===
Bulgaria Air previously operated these aircraft:

- Avro RJ70
- Boeing 737-300
- Boeing 737-500
- BAe 146-200
- BAe 146-300

== See also ==
- Transport in Bulgaria
