= Hemus Air =

Hemus Air Хемус Ер

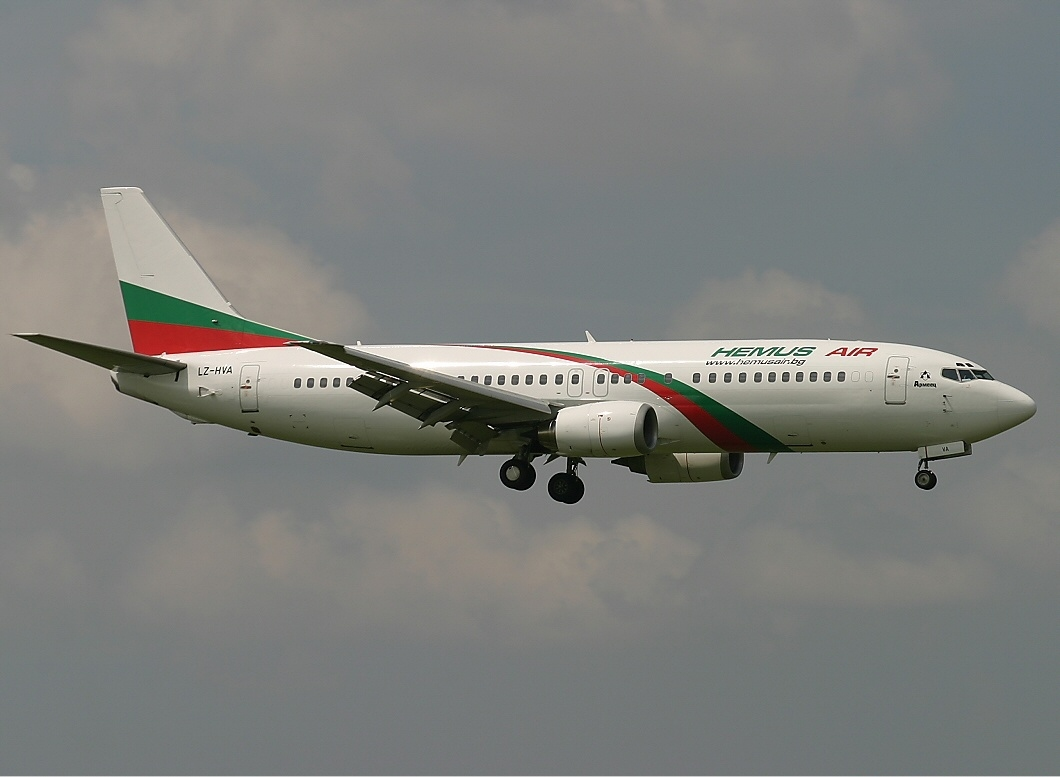
- Boeing 737-400
IATA	ICAO	Call sign
DU	HMS	HEMUS AIR
- Founded: 1986
- Commenced operations: 1986
- Ceased operations: 2014 (merged into Bulgaria Air)
- Hubs: Sofia Airport
- Focus cities: Varna Airport
- Subsidiaries: Viaggio Air
- Fleet size: 12
- Headquarters: Sofia, Bulgaria
- Website: www.air.bg

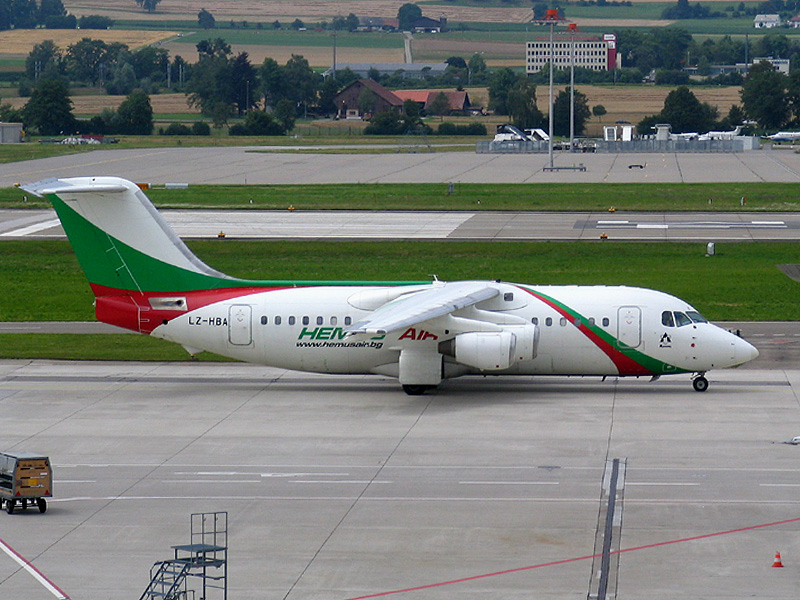
BAe146-200

Hemus Air (Bulgarian title: Хемус Ер) is a non-operating subsidiary airline of Bulgaria Air based in Sofia, Bulgaria. Previously it operated scheduled domestic and international services from Sofia and Varna, as well as charter, cargo and air ambulance services. Its main base was Sofia Airport, with a hub at Varna Airport.

== History ==
Hemus Air, named after the ancient name for the Balkan mountains, was owned by Varna-based industrial/financial enterprise TIM. The airline was established in 1986 as an autonomous unit of Balkan Bulgarian Airlines and started operations in 1987. It initially operated ambulance services, flight calibration and aerial photography and, from December 1990, also schedules. In 1996, it became a separate legal entity of Balkan Bulgarian Airlines. Hemus Air was privatized by Bulgarian investors in 2002 faced stiff competition from foreign carriers, as well as the newly established successor of Balkan, Bulgaria Air.

Hemus Air's management pledged to unite the major Bulgarian airlines and was selected as the preferred bidder for the sale of Bulgaria Air by the Bulgarian government. In November 2006, Balkan Hemus Group sealed a deal to purchase Bulgaria Air with a 99.99% share of the airline for €6.6 million. The new airline would operate under the Bulgaria Air brand. Hemus promised to invest a further €86m over the next five years and in 2007 began to coordinate the schedules and operations with Bulgaria Air. As of February 2009, all Hemus aircraft were operating for the nes parent company, Bulgaria Air. This latter absorbed assets and operations in early 2010s.

== Destinations ==
All Hemus Air destinations are now operated under the commercial brand of Bulgaria Air.

== Fleet ==
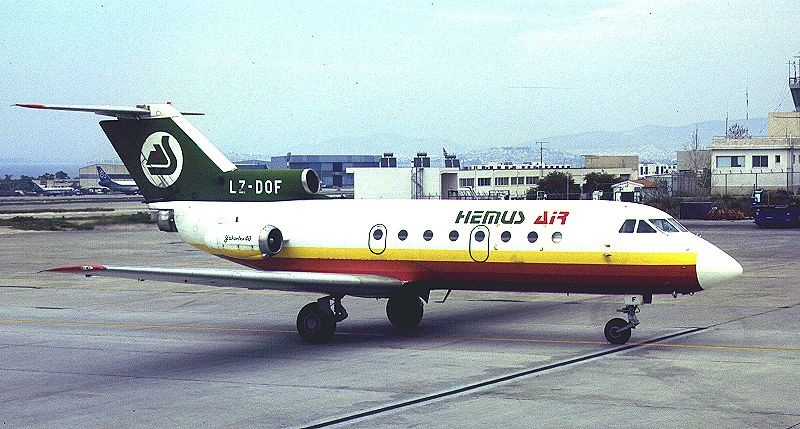
Yakovlev Yak-40 was the first jet-propelled aircraft in service

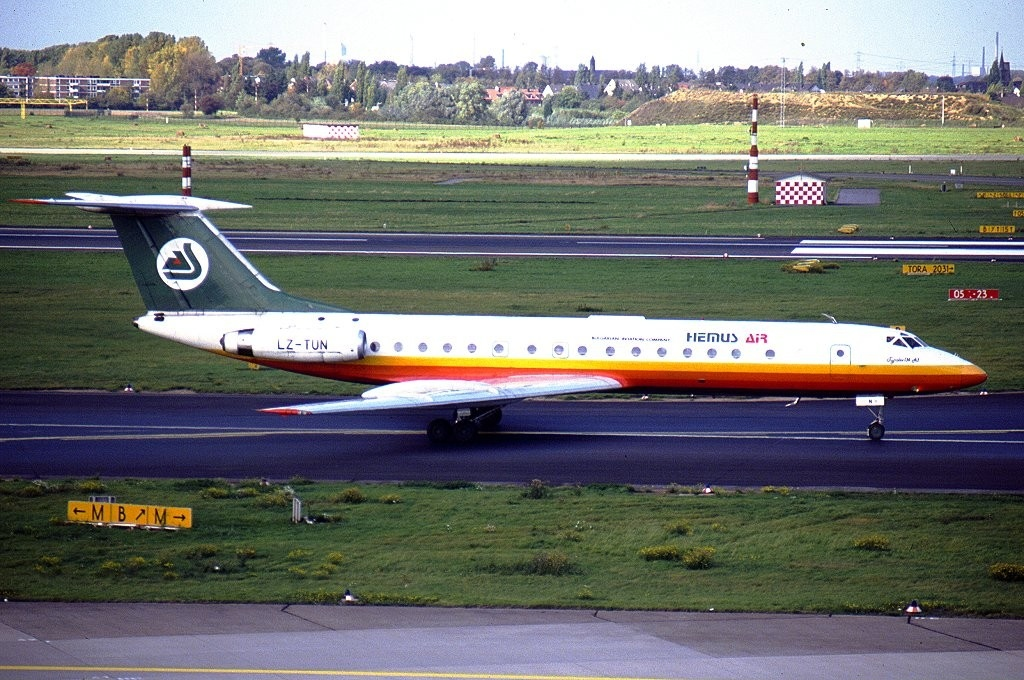
Tupolev Tu-134s were instrumental to enlarge the operations range

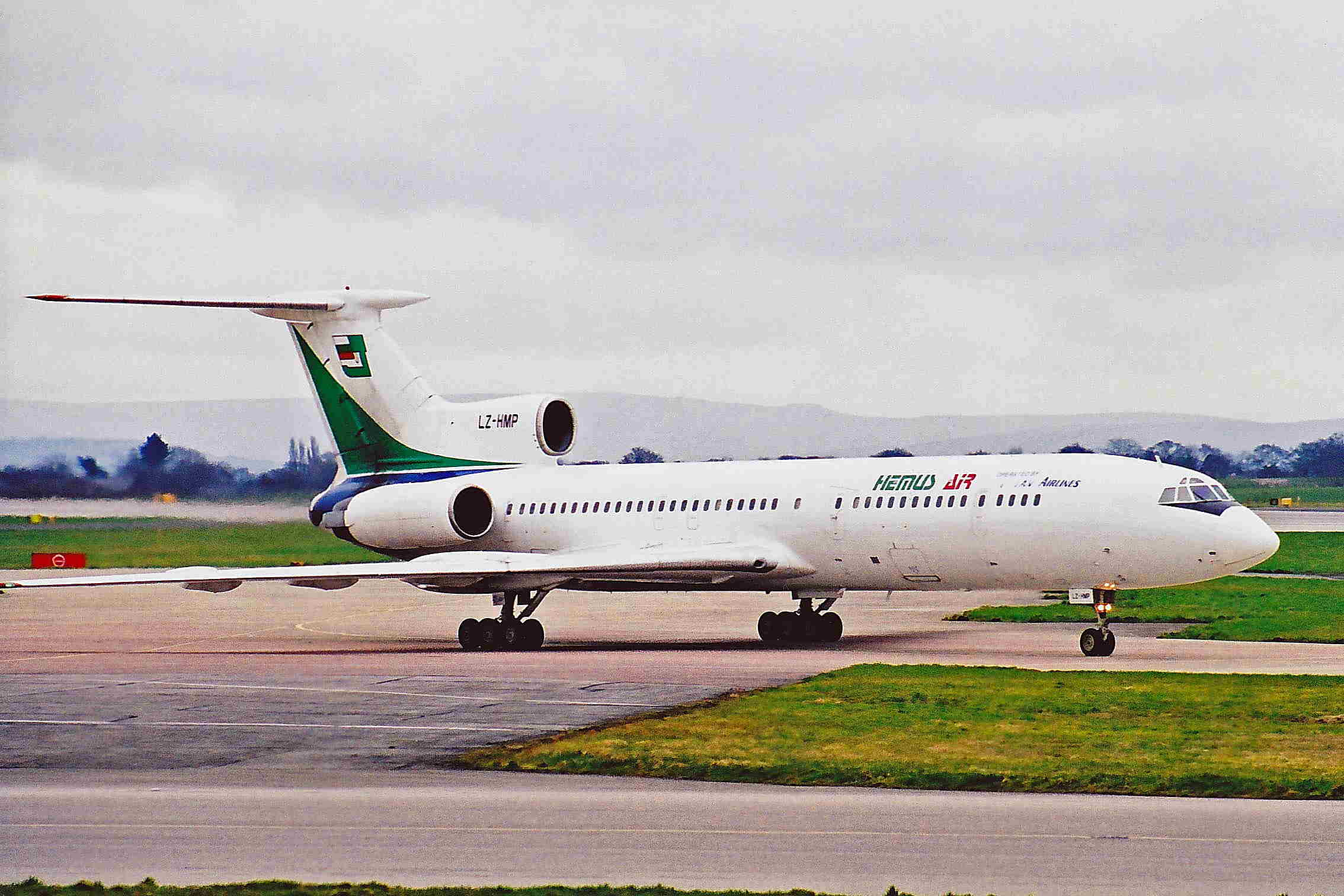
Tupolev Tu-154 was the largest aircraft in operation

The Hemus Air fleet includes the following aircraft (at July 2012):

Hemus Air fleet
Aircraft	Total	Passengers	Routes	Notes
Airbus A319-100	2	144	Short-Medium haul Europe and Middle East	Operating for Bulgaria Air.
ATR 42-300	1	46	Short haul Balkans	Stored at Sofia Airport.
Avro RJ70	1	26	Short haul VIP	Operating private and VIP charters.
BAe146-200	3	90	Short-Medium haul Europe	Operating for Bulgaria Air, 2 are stored at Sofia Airport.
BAe146-300	3	110	Short haul Europe	Operating for Bulgaria Air,
Total	10			

Most of these aircraft are operating for Bulgaria Air until the two airlines merge; then they will all be transferred to Bulgaria Air's fleet.

=== Retired fleet ===
- Boeing 737-300
- Boeing 737-400
- Tupolev Tu-134
- Tupolev Tu-154
- Yakovlev Yak-40
- Let L-410 Turbolet

== Accidents and incidents ==
- On 2 August 1988, Yak-40 LZ-DOK failed to get airborne and crashed after it overran the runway at Sofia Airport, killing 29 of 37 on board. All civil traffic had been halted at Sofia Airport to allow Todor Zhivkov's Tu-154 to take off. But the Tu-154 was delayed, so ATC cleared the Yak-40 to take off "as quickly as possible". In their haste, the crew forgot to set the trim correctly. (Note: Flight International stated that the operating company was Balkan Airlines (the parent company of Hemus Air on this date), that the aircraft crashed due to an aborted takeoff following an engine fire, and that the death toll was 27, plus five more who died in hospital.)
- Hemus Air Flight 7081 was hijacked en route from Beirut International Airport to Varna on 3 September 1996. The hijacker, a member of the Popular Front for the Liberation of Palestine, allowed the 150 passengers to leave the aircraft at Varna and he and the eight crew members continued to Oslo Airport, Gardermoen where he gave up. He initially claimed that he only wanted to seek asylum, but he later claimed he was under orders to crash the aircraft into Oslo.
