= Balkan Bulgarian Airlines =

National airline of Bulgaria (1947–2002)

Balkan Bulgarian Airlines Балкан

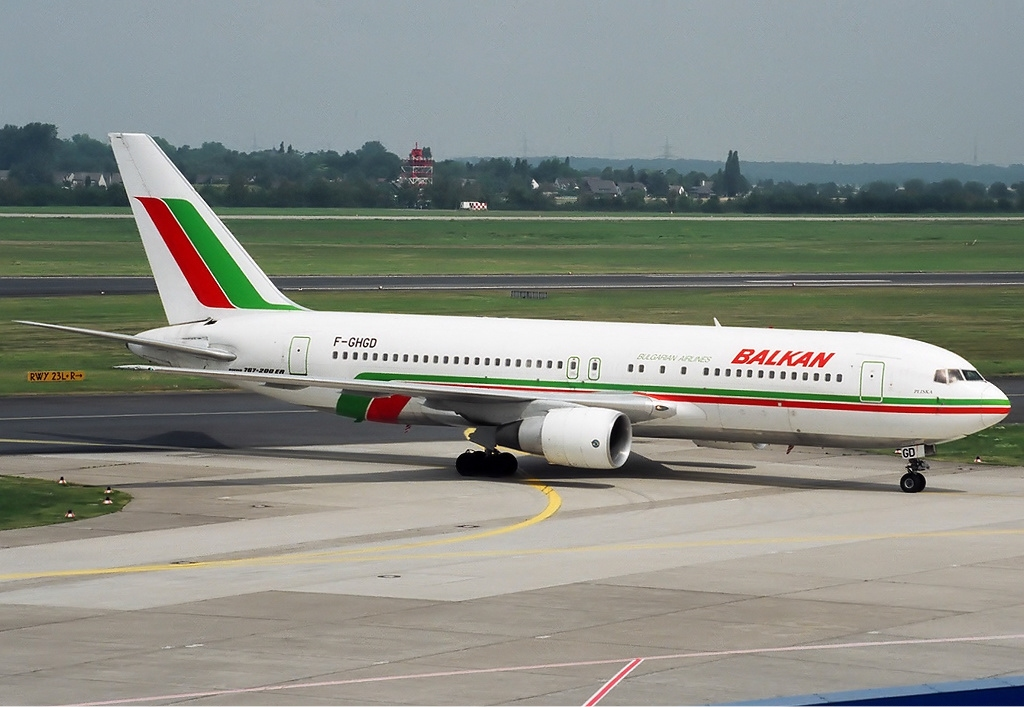
- Boeing 767-200
IATA	ICAO	Call sign
LZ	LAZ	BALKAN
- Founded: 29 June 1947
- Commenced operations: July 1947
- Ceased operations: October 2002
- Hubs: Sofia
- Focus cities: Burgas; Plovdiv; Varna
- Headquarters: Sofia, Bulgaria

Balkan Bulgarian Airlines (Bulgarian: Балкан) was Bulgaria's government-owned flag carrier airline between 1947 and 2002. During the 1970s, the airline became a significant European carrier. The company encountered financial instability following the fall of communism in Central and Eastern Europe. Despite managing to continue operations, following the start of the 21st century and a controversial privatisation, it declared bankruptcy in 2002. Balkan was liquidated in late October 2002. Balkan's assets and operations were transferred to Balkan Air Tour in December 2002.

== History ==
=== Early years ===
Bulgaria had a short-lived pre-WWII airline (Bunavad) in 1927, as the country could not afford investing in modern air transport until after World War II. In 1946, the Ministry of Transport and Communications formed Administration of Air Communications (Bulgarian: Дирекция на въздушните съобщения (ДВС), Direkcia na vazdushnite saobshtenia (DVS)). Since Bulgaria was regarded as an ally on the defeated Axis side, DVS could only deal with France for the delivery of several Atelier d'Avions Coulombe Toucan aircraft (French-built versions of the Junkers Ju 52). In prevision of their delivery, Bulgarian airmen practised by flying the nation's first "long-distance" flights to Paris, transporting government officials to peace negotiations, being conducted there. These flights used German-built Ju 52 aircraft (Bulgarian service designation Сова or Sova, = Owl), delivered before the war to the На Негово Величество Въздушни войски [НВВВ] or His majesty's Air Force, and captured during the war by retreating German forces.

DVS officially launched services as B.V.S.-Bulgarske Vazdusne Sobstenie (either Bulgarian Air Lines (Bulgarian: Български въздушни линии, Balgarski vazdushni linii) on 29 June 1947 with a Ju 52 flight from Sofia via Plovdiv to Burgas. Other services soon followed. By the end of the year, DVS had ordered several Soviet-built Lisunov Li-2 (variants of the Douglas DC-3) and at least 13 were operated until 1968. The Soviet forces stationed in Bulgaria took interest in DVS, and by late 1947, had transformed DVS into a joint ownership, as had been done with all airlines of East Europe nations formerly allied with Nazi Germany. On September 12, 1949 it was renamed TABSO (Bulgarian: ТАБСО), an acronym for "Transportno-aviacionno balgaro-savetsko obedinenie" (Bulgarian: Транспортно-авиационно българо-съветско обединение, Bulgarian-Soviet Transport Aviation Corporation) and was considered a real airline company. The Ju 52s gradually phased out from service as TABSO re-equipped with Li-2s. These more modern planes allowed the airline to expand services.

=== The 1950s and 1960s ===
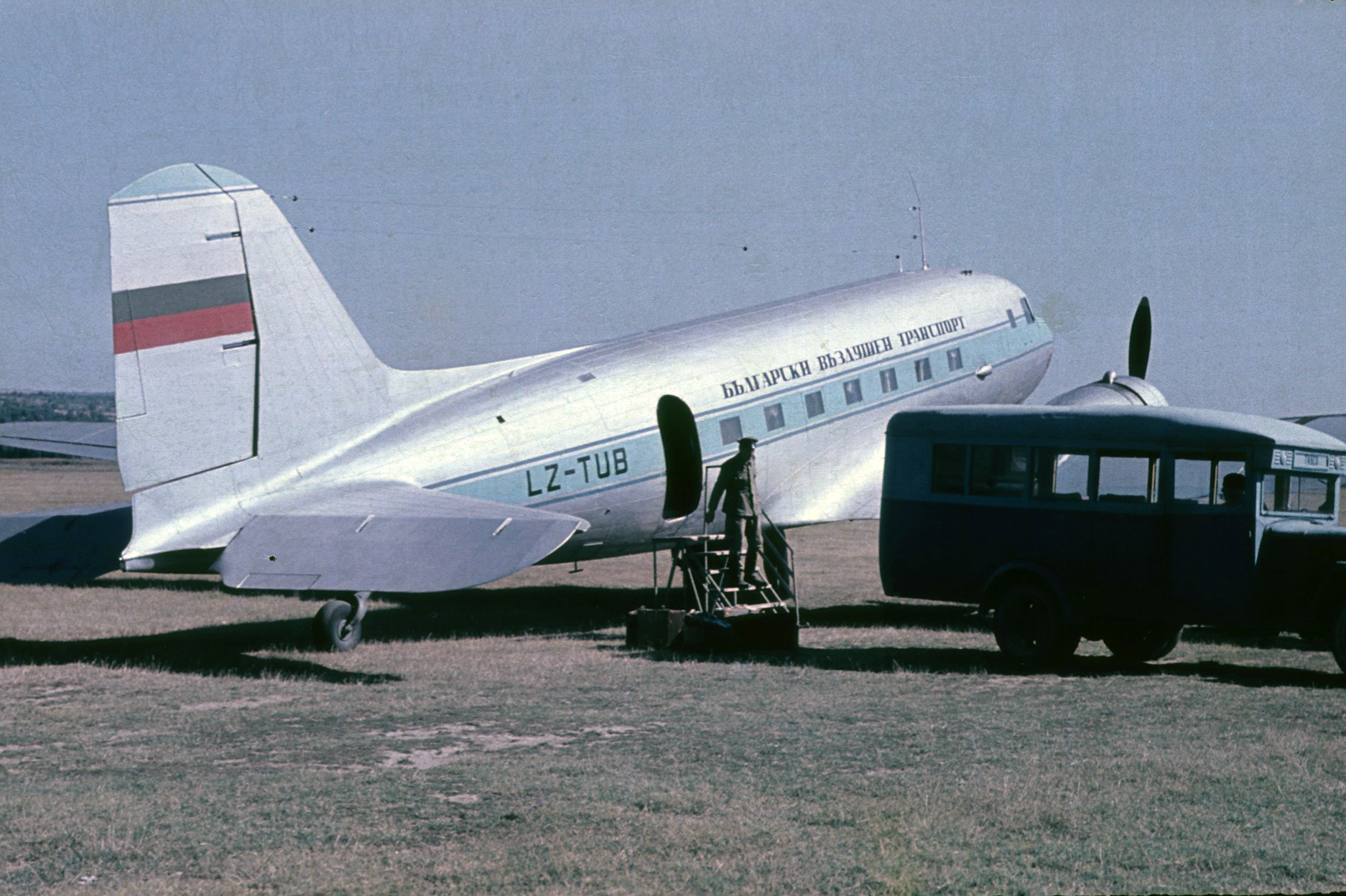
TABSO Lisunov Li-2 at Gorna Oryahovitsa Airport. (1956)

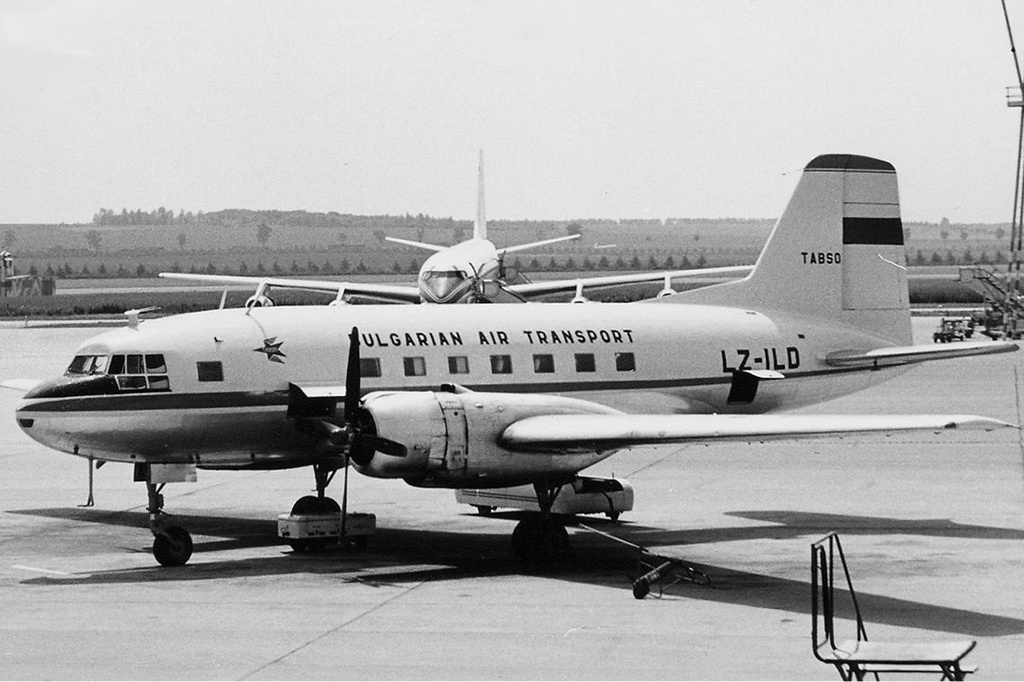
TABSO VEB-14P at Vienna. (1962)

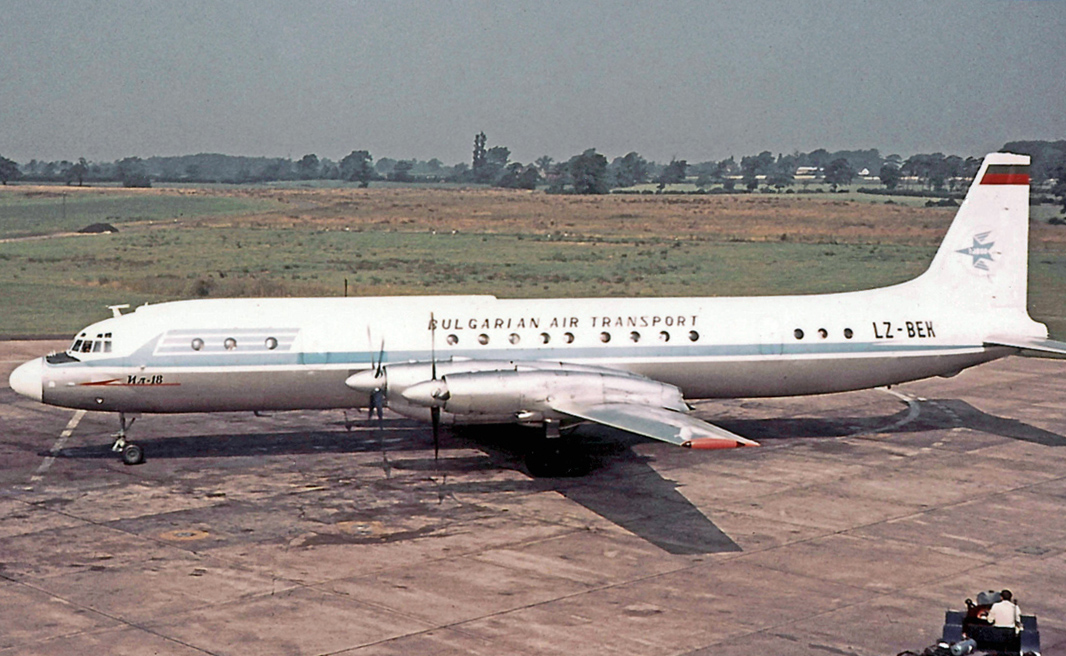
A Bulgarian Air Transport Ilyushin Il-18 at Ringway Airport in 1968

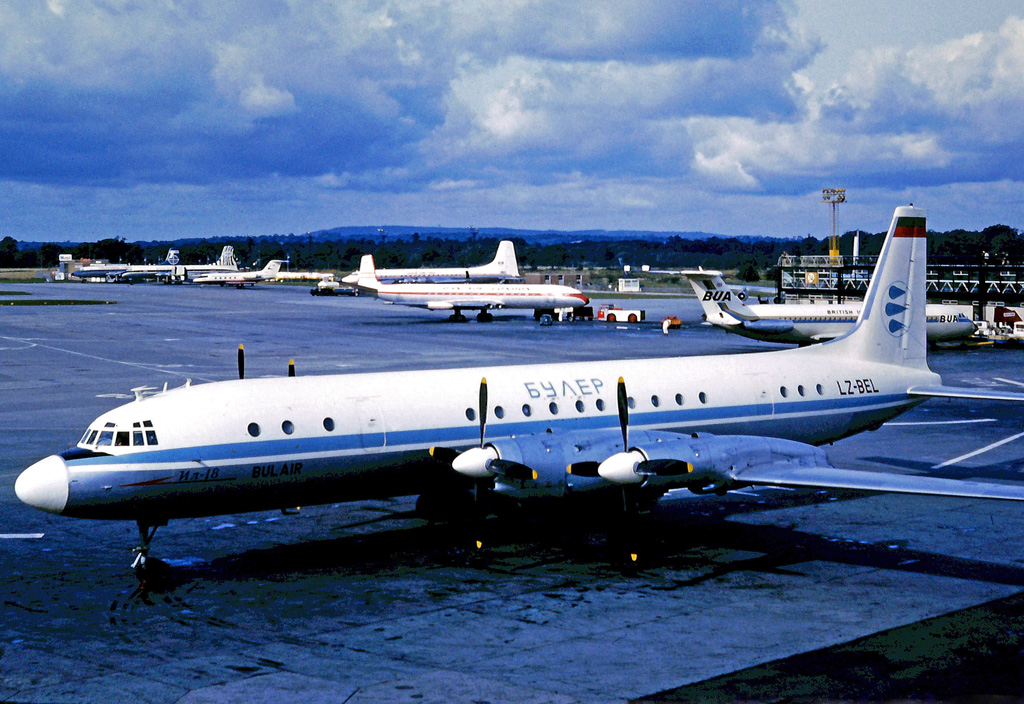
Ilyushin Il-18 of Bulair at London Gatwick Airport in 1969

Soviet equity in TABSO was reacquired by the Bulgarian government in 1954. The airline continued until the end of 1967 with this name, often in the shadow of the headline titling Bulgarian Air Transport. In 1956, TABSO bought its first Ilyushin Il-14 aircraft. These aircraft, along with Li-2s, were deployed on services to seven domestic destinations, including Burgas, Gorna Oryahovitsa, Ruschuk, Plovdiv, Sofia, Stara Zagora and Varna; and international destinations were Amsterdam, Athens, Beirut, Belgrade, Berlin, Bucharest, Budapest, Damascus, Frankfurt, Kiev, Moscow, Odessa, Prague, Vienna and Warsaw.

In 1962, TABSO put in service the four-engines turboprop airliner Ilyushin Il-18; these and the expansion of Bulgaria's inclusive-tour tourism industry began to put the airline's name on the European and world map. The turboprop aircraft crossed the Equator to Kenya and the Atlantic to Peru. By 1967, some Antonov An-24s had been delivered for domestic and regional flights. By the mid-1960s, tourism was a major hard currency earner for Bulgaria and TABSO faced home-grown competition. Executives of the Teksim trading company had decided to start their own aviation business which included crop-spraying and inclusive-tour charter airline operations under the name of Булер (Bulair). Despite trying to buy Sud Aviation Caravelle jet airliners, under heavy Soviet and Bulgarian political pressure, Bulair ended up buying more Il-18s. These were operated to several Western European countries to bring holiday makers to Bulgarian resorts (mainly Varna and Burgas).

The Teksim venture proved a success and a thorn in the side of TABSO. By 1967, TABSO had the inside track in government circles, and the Teksim operation was largely disbanded by 1970. Amid rumours of scandal and embezzling several Teksim directors were sent to jail, accused of performing capitalism-ruled economic behaviour. Their venture had operated under the TABSO banner for reasons of expediency (not least international rights). The last Bulair-branded aircraft had been rebranded as TABSO aircraft by 1972.

The carrier bought three Tupolev Tu-134 jets in late 1967. On 1 January 1968, TABSO was renamed Balkan Bulgarian Airlines in February 1968(Bulgarian: Балкан – Български въздушни линии, Balkan – Bulgarski vazdushni linii). The wider commercial aviation scene was put under Balkan's control via subsidiaries such as the aforementioned Bulair, Селскостопанска авиация [ССА] or Selskostopanska aviacia [SSA] (the Agricultural Aviation Company) and a separate profit centre which performed ad hoc aviation contracting, mostly with helicopters.

The first Tu-134 was put into service in November 1968, initially flying scheduled services between Sofia and London. The airline became the first foreign customer of the type, leading to a close association with the Tupolev design bureau that lasted two decades. There were several reasons why Bulgaria was allowed to put a new Soviet type into service ahead of more important Soviet-bloc nations. Andrei Tupolev was President of the Soviet-Bulgarian Society. He had cemented personal links with his Bulgarian counterpart, formidable wartime Resistance figure and Politburo member Tsola Dragoycheva. She lobbied him for delivery preferences in return for campaigning before the Bulgarian authorities to buy his products rather than Western or other Soviet aircraft types. Indeed, Balkan never bought the Ilyushin Il-62 long-range airliner, preferring to misuse its Tu-154s for long-range work. Similarly, it eschewed Ilyushin's Il-86 wide-body despite arguably having the precise role for it on its sea or ski charter flights.

=== The 1970s ===
At March 1970, Balkan served 22 countries in Africa, Asia and Europe plus nine domestic destinations. At this time, the fleet included Antonov An-2s, An-10s and An-24Bs, Ilyushin Il-14s and Il-18s, Tupolev Tu-134s, Z-37 Cmelaks and Mil helicopters. Lazar Beloukhov was the general manager. On 18 January 1971, an Ilyushin Il-18 crashed and caught fire while attempting to land at Kloten Airport in fog; only two people survived the crash. During 1971, Balkan was the first airline beyond the USSR borders to operate the Tupolev Tu-134A. On 21 December, the crash of another Il-18 during takeoff left 28 fatalities.

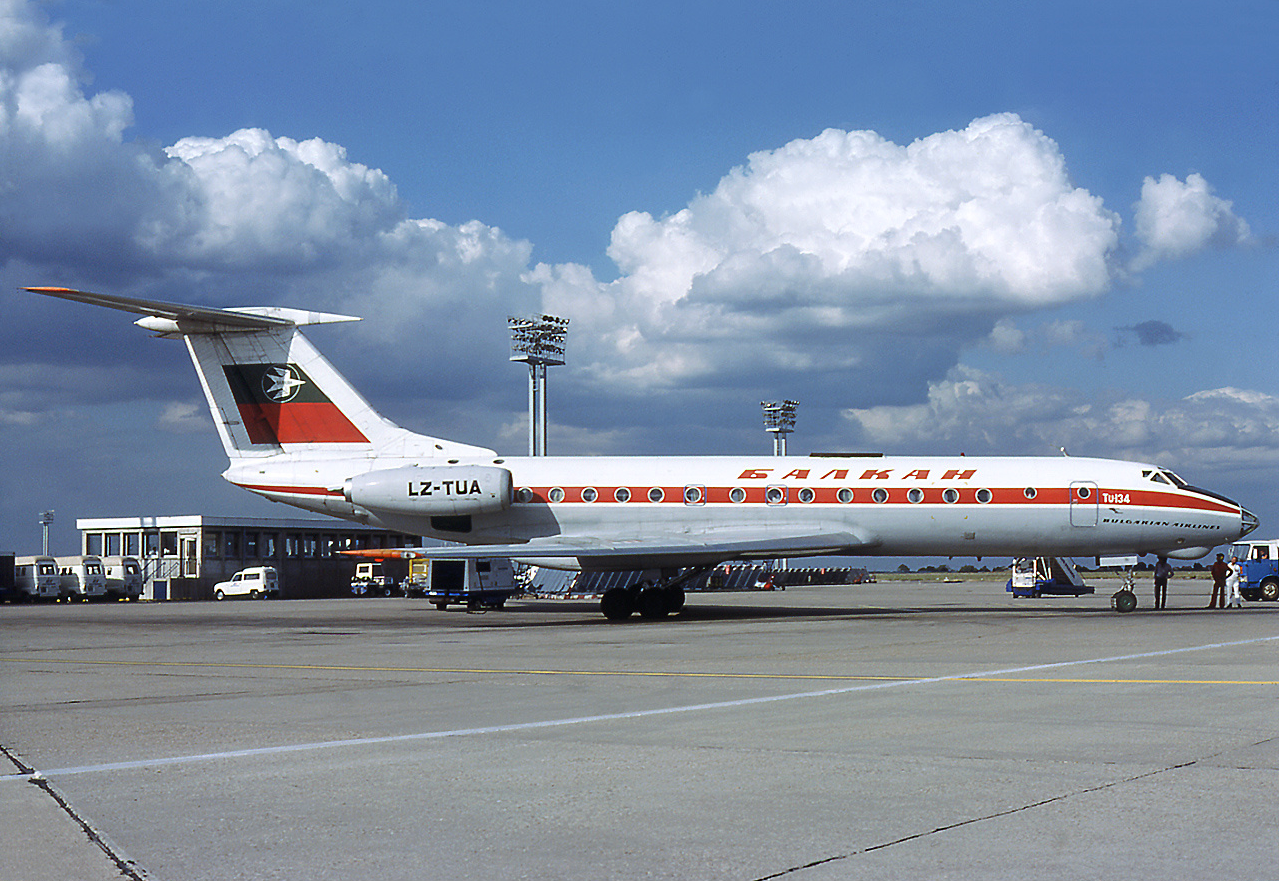
A Balkan Tupolev Tu-134. This particular aircraft, LZ-TUA, was the first aircraft of the type received by the airline.

Again in 1972, this time with the Tupolev Tu-154, the carrier became the first foreign customer to incorporate a new Tupolev aircraft into its fleet. The latter type was deployed first on charter flights, and later on scheduled services. By November the same year, Balkan had two of these aircraft in service. It also launched non-Soviet use of the Tu-154A, Tu-154B, Tu-154B-2 and Tu-154M. Balkan was a useful test-bed for new ideas by the Tupolev bureau. The airline pioneered the use of three-person flightdeck crews on the Tu-154 by removing navigators (flight crew members whom the designers had intentionally inserted into the Tu-134 and Tu-154) between 1972 and 1976. Balkan also removed the Tu-154's concrete ballast trim on which conservative Tupolev engineers had insisted. In the mid-1980s, a team of Bulgarian engineers interlinked the automatic flight control systems of the airline's Tu-154s with OMEGA Navigation System receivers, enabling very accurate automatic long-range overwater navigation. In the 1990s, Balkan was among the first to fit GPS navigation to its Tu-154 fleet. A Tu-154B was flown non-stop from Montreal to Sofia, a distance of over 7,000 km (4,300 mi) and a record for the type, during a charter flight.

As the Soviet-bloc economies gradually entered into stagnation in the 1970s, Balkan continued growing apace. In 1974, the airline's route network was 74,500 miles (119,900 km) long. By the mid/late 1970s, it was carrying three million passengers a year, more than any Soviet-bloc airline other than some Directorates of Aeroflot. The fleet comprised aforementioned types plus Antonov An-12s for cargo (since late 1969) and Yakovlev Yak-40 regional jets for short-haul routes (since 1974). The comprehensive route system covered Europe, North Africa and the Middle East. With the delivery of more Tu-154s, Balkan opened longer-range routes, including ones to Zimbabwe, Angola and Nigeria in sub-Equatorial Africa, and to Sri Lanka and Vietnam in Southern Asia.

=== The 1980s ===
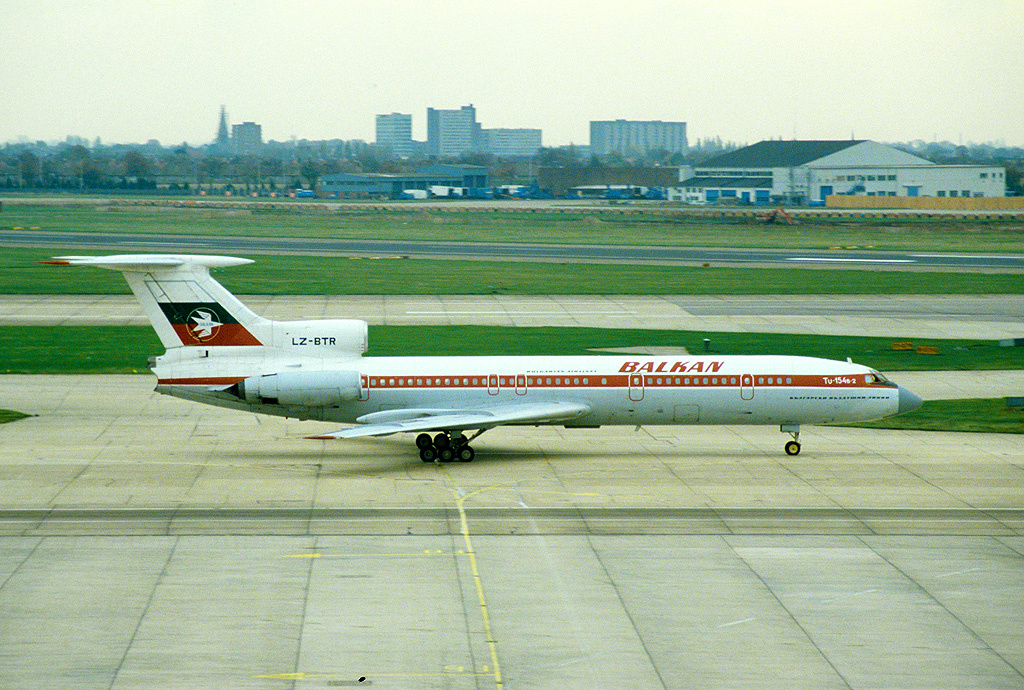
A Balkan Bulgarian Airlines Tupolev Tu-154B2 at London Heathrow Airport in 1981

In 1986, Balkan was restructured as part of a wholesale shakeup of the late Socialist economy in an attempt to make it more productive and manageable. The airline was divorced from functions such as running airports. It had suffered disastrous traffic falls after the Comecon fuel crisis of 1979, when the number of passengers carried collapsed to under a million. By the late 1980s, loads were back up to 1970s levels. Of the three million annual passengers, a third were carried on domestic services, another third on charter flights, and the remaining million on scheduled international routes.

Balkan joined the International Air Transport Association (IATA) in 1988, becoming its 175th member worldwide. On 10 November 1989, Bulgaria's long-ruling leader Todor Zhivkov was removed from power and Bulgaria began moving away from the Soviet bloc. Within a year, Balkan had been restructured yet again, with Hemus Air emerging from within it as a "second force" state-owned airline with mainly domestic and regional flights. Private airlines began to appear, most important among them Singapore-backed Jes Air which launched services to New York and Singapore using Airbus A310s.

=== The 1990s ===
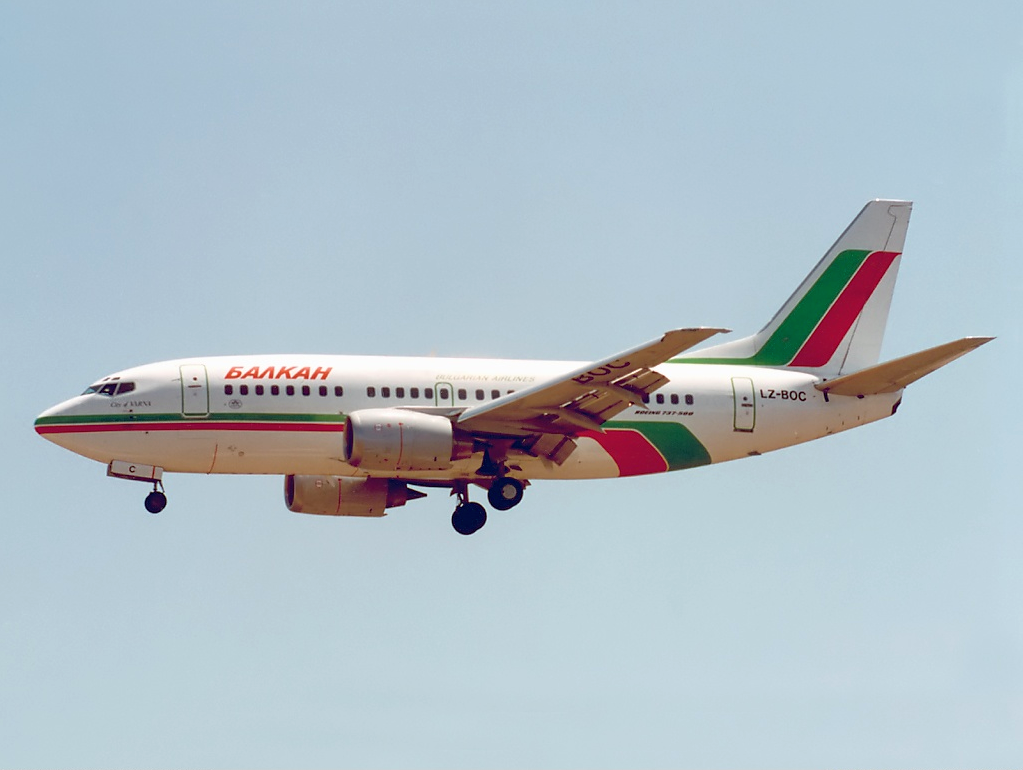
Balkan Bulgarian Airlines Boeing 737-500, 1992

By mid-1991, Balkan had leased two Boeing 767-200ERs from Air France to compete with failing Jes Air on North American and Southern Asian routes. At the same time Balkan acquired four Airbus A320s from Oryx. The Soviet-build types remained in service alongside the new arrivals.

The 1990s were a time of headlong decline at Balkan. The airline suffered in Bulgaria's transition to a market economy. Former managers of state-owned industry began forming private companies to supply the industries they had once managed (at high prices), and yet other private companies to purchase their production (at low prices). The aim was to control both supply and sales, charging high prices and paying low prices to strangle state companies and then privatise them at very low prices. The entire Bulgarian economy was in deep recession. This was due to severe political instability at home and protracted wars and economic sanctions in neighbouring Yugoslavia. These factors upset potential investment and tourism and cut off Bulgaria from many trading partners.

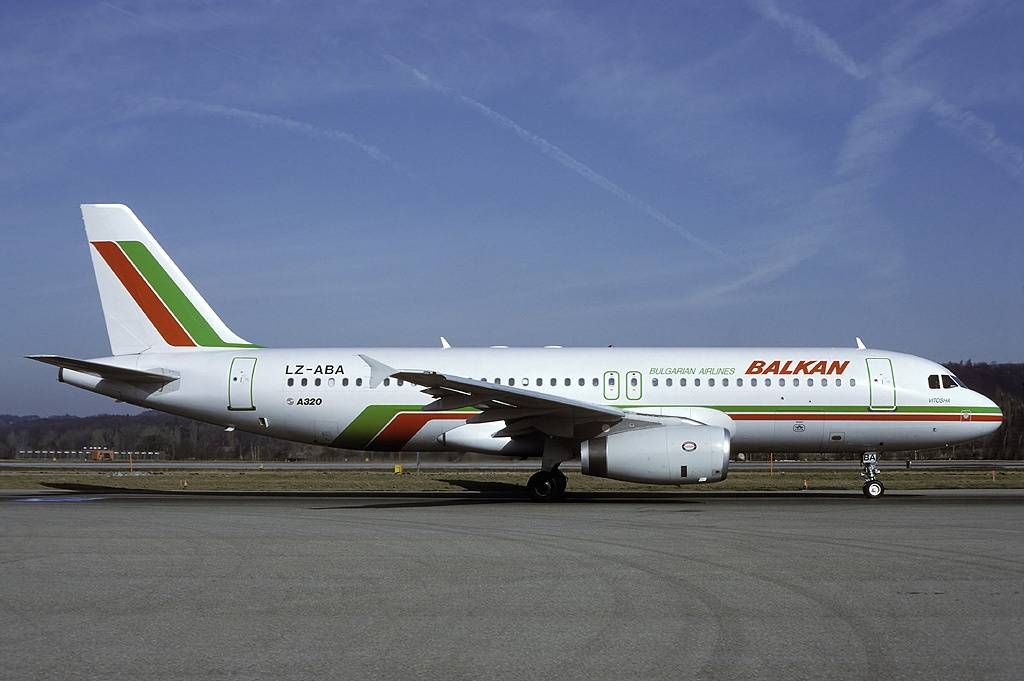
A Balkan Bulgarian Airlines Airbus A320-200 at Zurich Airport in 1992

In March 1995, Balkan had a fleet of four Airbus A320-200s, three Antonov An-12Fs, fourteen Antonov An-24s, three Boeing 737-500s, two Boeing 767-200ERs, six Ilyushin Il-18s, five Tupolev Tu-134A-3s, fifteen Tupolev Tu-154B-2s and seven Tupolev Tu-154Ms. At this time, the company had 3,889 employees and the route network included 52 destinations. By 1998, Balkan's 767s returned to Air France and the A320s were passed on to other lessees. The Tu-154B fleet was overdue for replacement, and the Tu-154M was aging. Bulgaria's government appeared to pledge some funds for Airbus A310 acquisition so that long-range services could be sustained, but nothing came of this.

Late in 1998, the company was ready to be sold to a holding named Balkan Air, comprising Bulgarian and US investors, but the transaction was later suspended. All through the decade, there had been rumours of investor interest in Balkan. These rumours consistently named Russian and German airline interests which were said to be eager to buy the carrier. There was also lobbying by the airline's managers for a management buyout. Nevertheless, a consortium comprising two Israeli companies —the Zeevi investment group and Knafaim-Arkia (the owner of Arkia Israel Airlines) — was assigned a 75 percent stake in Balkan Bulgarian in mid-1999 for a bargain price of US$150,000, with the commitment of investing US$100 million in the airline over the following ten years. Arkia left the consortium once title in the airline was transferred. It was disclosed in 2001 that Balkan had been declared bankrupt months prior to the sale.

=== 2000 and beyond ===
Balkan had 3,889 employees at March 2000. At this time, the fleet included three Antonov An-12s; six Antonov An-24Bs and an An-24RV; two Boeing 737-300s and three 737-500s; an Ilyushin Il-18 and an Il-18D; three Let L 410 UVP-Es; and fourteen Tupolev Tu-154Bs and ten Tu-154Ms. These operated services to Abu Dhabi, Accra, Algiers, Amsterdam, Athens, Bahrain, Bangkok, Belgrade, Berlin, Bourgas, Brussels, Budapest, Cairo, Casablanca, Chișinău, Colombo, Copenhagen, Dubai, Frankfurt, Helsinki, Istanbul, Kyiv, Kuwait, Lagos, Larnaca, London, Madrid, Malé, Malta, Milan, Moscow, Paris, Prague, Rome, Sofia, Stockholm, Tehran, Tel Aviv, Tripoli, Varna, Vienna, Warsaw and Zurich. The Israeli connection led to difficulties in operating the Arab routes. Its assets seemed to be being sold-off in an asset-stripping manner and by early 2001, Balkan's fleet was not even up to the task of meeting the airline's summer charter commitments, despite taking on some used 737-300s. In February 2001, the Zeevi group ceased funding the carrier and initiated legal action against the Bulgarian government over a US$100 million debt. Although the company was grounded and entered receivership, it resumed flying later that year.

Short of cash, in 2002 Balkan's six weekly slots for Heathrow airport were sold to British Airways for US$6 million. In October that year, creditors turned down a restructuring plan and voted for the closure of the airline, which was liquidated. The number of employees at the time of closure was 1,269. Balkan was succeeded as Bulgaria's national carrier by the newly formed Bulgaria Air.

== Fleet ==
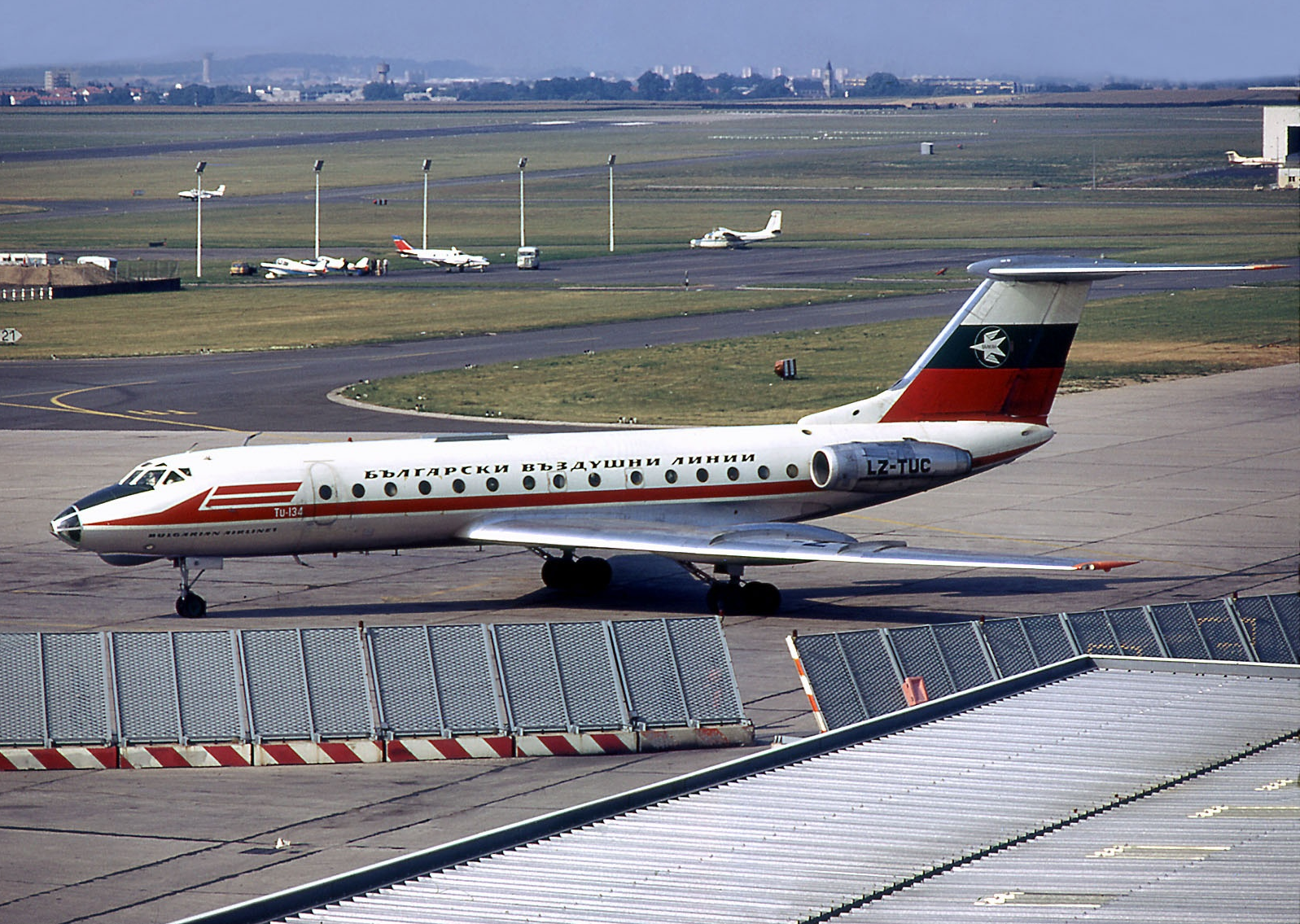
A Balkan Bulgarian Airlines Tupolev Tu-134 at Le Bourget Airport in 1974.

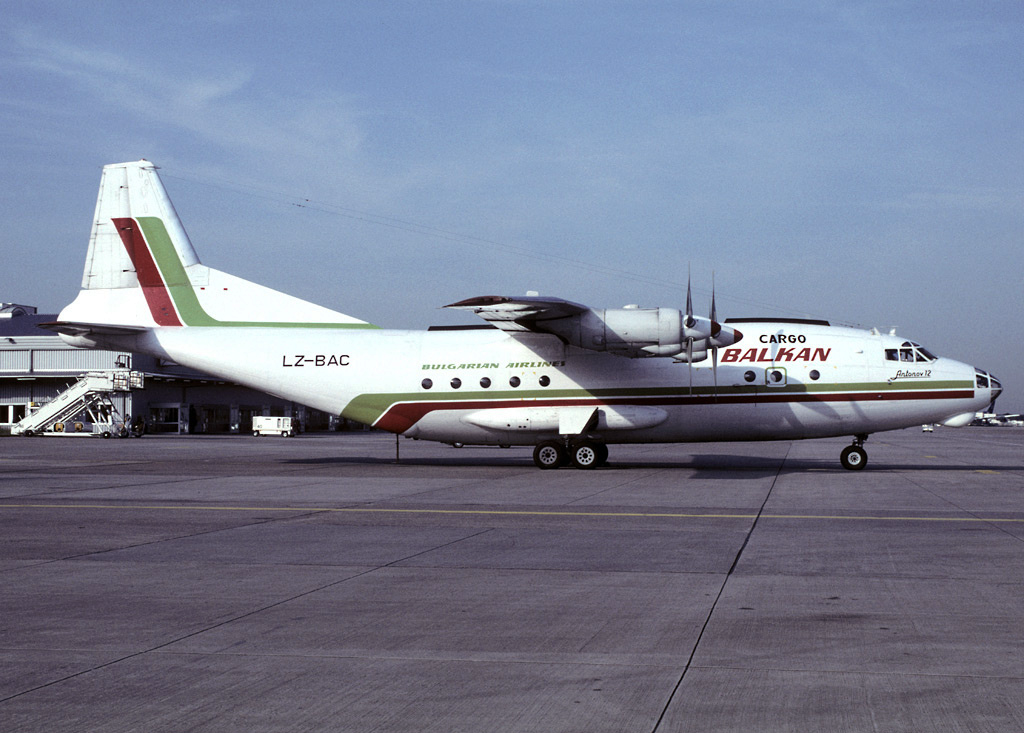
A Balkan Bulgarian Airlines Antonov An-12B at Düsseldorf Airport in 1998.

Until 1990, Balkan's signs were carried both by normal airliners and special government detachment, agricultural aviation, sanitary wings, cargo planes. Here follows the fleet except An-2 /281 pieces/ and Ка-26, as well as civil Mi-8s /17 pieces/, Mi-17 /1 piece/, Mi-2, training L-410s.

Balkan Bulgarian Airlines fleet evolution throughout the years
Aircraft	1970	1980	1990	2000
Antonov An-2	Unknown	—	—	—
Antonov An-10	Unknown	—	—	—
Antonov An-12	—	—	—	3
Antonov An-12B	—	1	—	—
Antonov An-12V	—	—	4	—
Antonov An-24	—	—	22	—
Antonov An-24B	7	8	—	6
Antonov An-24RV	—	—	—	1
Boeing 737-300	—	—	—	2
Boeing 737-500	—	—	—	3
Boeing 767-200	—	—	2	—
Ilyushin Il-14	6	—	—	—
Ilyushin Il-18	11	7	2	1
Ilyushin Il-18D	—	—	—	1
Let L-410UVP-E	—	—	—	3
Tupolev Tu-134	3	13	9	—
Tupolev Tu-154	—	13	21	—
Tupolev Tu-154B	—	—	—	14
Tupolev Tu-154M	—	—	—	10
Yakovlev Yak-40	—	12	11	—
Zlin Z-37 Cmelak	Unknown	—	—	—
Total	54	54	69	44

== Accidents and incidents ==
As of August 2012, Aviation Safety Network records 15 occurrences and four hijackings for Balkan, and two fatal accidents plus one hijacking for TABSO. Only events that led to fatalities, wrote off the aircraft involved, or both, are presented in the list below.

Date	Location	Airline	Aircraft	Tail number	Aircraft damage	Fatalities	Description	Refs
30 June 1948	(Turkey) Istanbul	TABSO	Ju 52	Unknown	None	1	The aircraft was hijacked en route a domestic scheduled Varna–Sofia passenger service and flown to Istanbul.	
22 November 1952	(People's Republic of Bulgaria) Sofia	TABSO	Li-2P	LZ-TUE	W/O	30/30	Struck mountainous terrain shortly after departing Vrazhdebna Airport. It was due to operate a domestic scheduled Sofia–Gorna Orechovitsa–Varna passenger flight.	
24 November 1966	(Czechoslovak Socialist Republic) Bratislava	TABSO	Il-18V	LZ-BEN	W/O	82/82	During final destination, the aircraft was operating the Budapest–Prague leg of Flight 101. Bad weather at Prague forced a temporary diversion to Bratislava. The plane was cleared to continue to Prague as weather there improved, but it crashed shortly after takeoff from Ivanka Airport.	
3 September 1968	(People's Republic of Bulgaria) Bourgas	Bulair	Il-18E	LZ-BEG	W/O	47/89	The flight, on TABSO's subsidiary, Bulair, crashed in poor weather during its approach to Bourgas Airport while bringing East German tourists from Dresden, and the crew deviated from its assigned altitude of 2400m and "flew into the ground".	
18 January 1971	(Switzerland) Zürich	Balkan	Il-18D	LZ-BED	W/O	45/47	Inbound from Paris as Flight 130, the plane approached Zurich Airport in fog below the glideslope, 0.7 kilometres (0.43 mi) north of the airport. Both the left wingtip and landing gear contacted the ground, and burst into flames.	
21 December 1971	(People's Republic of Bulgaria) Sofia	Balkan	Il-18V	LZ-BES	W/O	28/73	Crashed on takeoff. The aircraft had just returned to service following ground maintenance; for reasons unknown, the aileron control cables were connected backwards. Bulgarian singer Pasha Hristova was among the dead.	
4 November 1972	(People's Republic of Bulgaria) Cruncha	Balkan	Il-14P	LZ-ILA	W/O	35/35	The aircraft was completing a domestic scheduled Bourgas–Sofia passenger service when it flew into mountainous terrain, in adverse weather, on approach to Vrazhdebna Airport.	
3 March 1973	(Soviet Union) Moscow	Balkan	Il-18V	LZ-BEM	W/O	25/25	Nosedived during second approach attempt to Sheremetyevo Airport, crashed and burst into flames, probably because of tail icing. The aircraft was on a scheduled Sofia–Moscow flight as Flight 307.	
22 November 1975	(People's Republic of Bulgaria) Sofia	Balkan	An-24B	LZ-ANA	W/O	3/45	Unable to gain height following takeoff from Vrazhdebna Airport, the aircraft slid down a ravine and ended up in the Iskar River.	
December 1975	(Libya) Kufrah	Balkan	An-12B	LZ-BAA	W/O	0	Overran the runway on landing at Kufrah Airport.	
16 March 1978	(People's Republic of Bulgaria) Gabare	Balkan	Tupolev Tu-134	LZ-TUB	W/O	73/73	Flight 107 struck the ground while en route during a scheduled international Sofia–Warsaw passenger flight. The aircraft crashed during an abnormal descent. The accident remains Bulgaria's deadliest.	
23 March 1978	(Syria) Damascus	Balkan	Tu-154	LZ-BTB	W/O	4/4	Hit high ground 22.5 kilometres (14.0 mi) northeast of Damascus on approach to the city airport.	
7 March 1983	(People's Republic of Bulgaria) Varna	Balkan	An-24B	LZ-AND	None	1/44	Flight 013 was operating a flight from Sofia to Varna when it was hijacked by four men. The aircraft landed safely in Varna. In the end, one hijacker was killed and a flight attendant was injured.	
10 January 1984	(People's Republic of Bulgaria) Sofia	Balkan	Tu-134A	LZ-TUR	W/O	50/50	Inbound from Berlin on an international scheduled passenger service, the aircraft struck power lines on approach to Vrazhdebna Airport in heavy snow, crashing 4 kilometres (2.5 mi) short of the runway.	
16 June 1984	(Yemen Arab Republic) Sanaa	Balkan	Il-18V	LZ-BEP	W/O	0/18	Overran the runway at Sanaa International Airport following a nosegear-first landing.	
24 August 1984	(Ethiopia) Addis Ababa	Balkan	An-12B	LZ-BAD	W/O	0/9	Overran the runway upon landing at Bole International Airport.	
2 August 1988	(People's Republic of Bulgaria) Sofia	Balkan (Hemus Air)	Yak-40	LZ-DOK	W/O	29/37	Rushing to expedite take-off, the crew appear to have set the trim incorrectly. The aircraft failed to become airborne, overran runway 09 into a ravine of the Iskar River and burst in flames; deaths are either 29 or 32 depending on source.	
5 June 1992	(Bulgaria) Varna	Balkan	Tu-154B	LZ-BTD	W/O	0/130	The aircraft made a long landing at Varna Airport and the nosegear collapsed as it ran off the runway. The aircraft was completing an unscheduled Stockholm–Varna passenger flight.	
28 July 1992	(Bulgaria) Sofia	Balkan	An-24B	LZ-ANN	W/O	0	Damaged by a crane at Sofia Airport.	
Unknown	(Bulgaria) Sofia	Balkan	Avia 14	LZ-ILG	W/O	0	Destroyed while undergoing maintenance at Vrazhdebna Airport.	
Unknown	(Bulgaria) Provadia	Balkan	Avia 14 Super	LZ-ILF	W/O	Unknown	Crashed under unspecified circumstances.	

== See also ==
- Transport in Bulgaria

== Sources ==
- Gradidge, Jennifer M. (2006). DC-1, DC-2, DC-3 The First Seventy Years. Tonbridge UK: Air-Britain. ISBN 085130-332-3.
