= Viaggio Air =

Bulgarian airline

IATA	ICAO	Call sign
VM	VOA	VIAGGIO
- Founded: 2002
- Ceased operations: 2007 (merged with Hemus Air)
- Hubs: Sofia Airport
- Fleet size: 2
- Headquarters: Sofia, Bulgaria
- Website: http://www.viaggioair.com/

Viaggio Air (VM) was a private airline based and registered in Sofia, Bulgaria in September 2002.

== History ==
It started operations with an ATR 42 aircraft on 27 February 2003. It firstly started operating flights to Vienna and Istanbul and had plans to operate to Kyiv and Athens. At a later stage it was 100% bought by Hemus Air (DU) and full merger was concluded on November 27, 2007.
