= Transport in the Czech Republic =

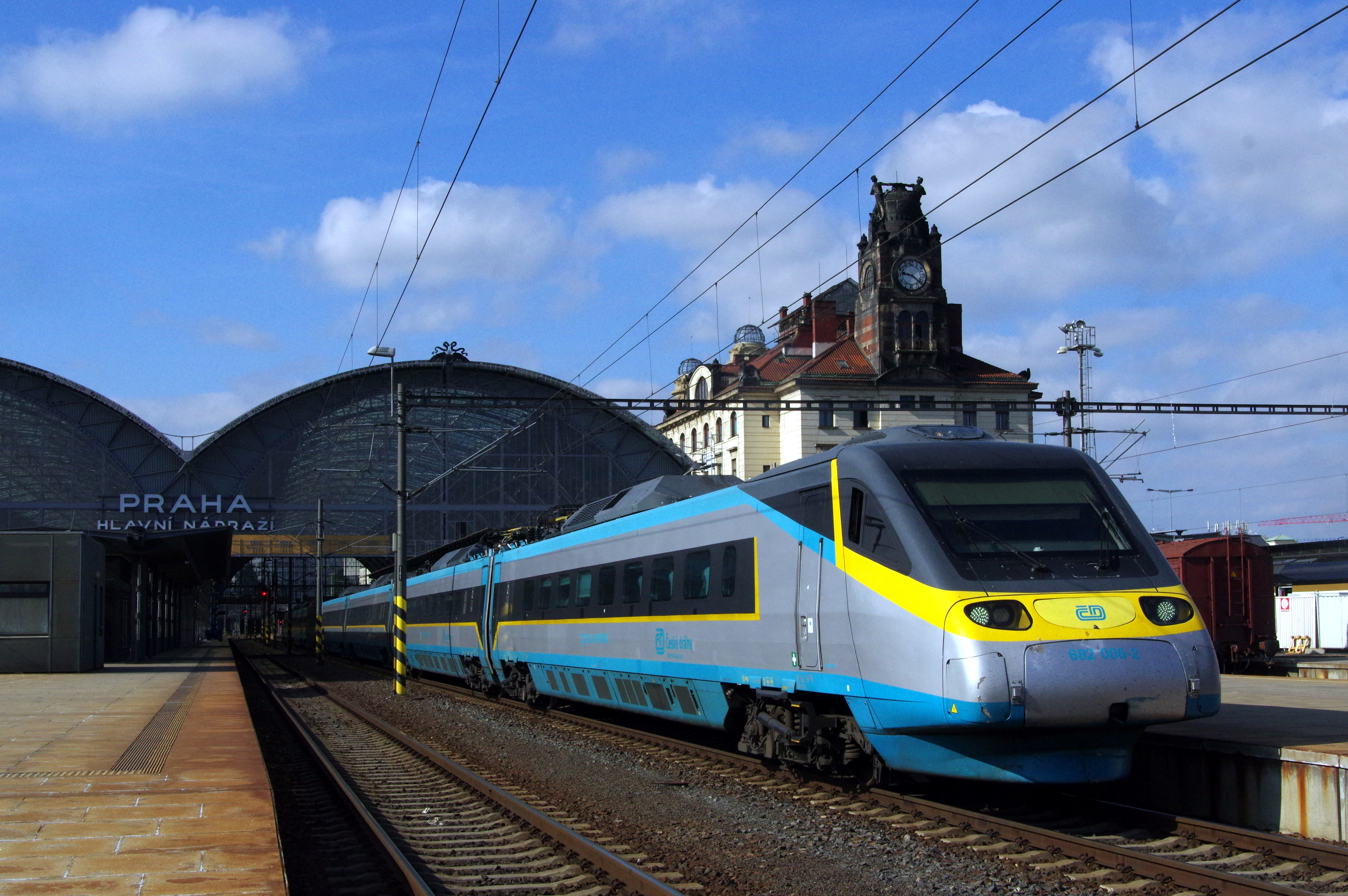
Pendolino 680 in Prague Main railway station

Transport in the Czech Republic relies on several main modes, including transport by road, rail, water and air.

== Rail transport ==
Map of the Czech railway network

The Czech Republic has a total railway length of 9,435 kilometres (5,863 mi) which makes it a country with the second highest rail density in the world. The vast majority (9,341 kilometres (5,804 mi)) is standard gauge. Electrified railways generally have voltages of 3 kV DC or 25 kV AC. 94 kilometres (58 mi) of track is narrow gauge. The most prominent Czech railway company is the state-owned České dráhy (ČD) (English: Czech Railways).

In April 2025, Czechia introduced Europe's first driverless passenger train on the 24-kilometer Kopidlno to Dolní Bousov line in the Mladá Boleslav District. Developed by AŽD Praha, the train features a modified 811 series engine named Edita, equipped with sensors and computing systems to autonomously monitor surroundings and adjust speed. Despite its autonomous capabilities, a driver remains on board during this testing phase due to legal requirements and to handle unforeseen situations. Fully autonomous operation without onboard staff is anticipated by 2031, pending technological advancements and legislative changes.

== Municipal transport ==
The Czech Republic has a long tradition of public transportation. Public transportation systems began to develop in the 1860s — horse-drawn trams were introduced in Brno as early as 1869, and in Prague in 1875.

Brno also had the first steam tram, which entered service there in 1884. Since the 1970s, seven tram systems have been in operation in the Czech Republic: in Prague, Brno, Ostrava, Plzeň, Liberec, Olomouc, and the joint tram system of Most and Litvínov. Since the 1990s, urban bus transport has been integrated with suburban bus transport, and since the beginning of the 21st century, urban and suburban railways (e.g., Esko) have also played a greater role.

=== Rapid transit ===
The only city in the Czech Republic where an urban underground railway system, known as the metro, has been built is Prague. The Prague metro began operations on 9 May 1974. The metro operates on three lines, A, B and C. A fourth one (Line D) is being constructed, with finish date expected around 2031.

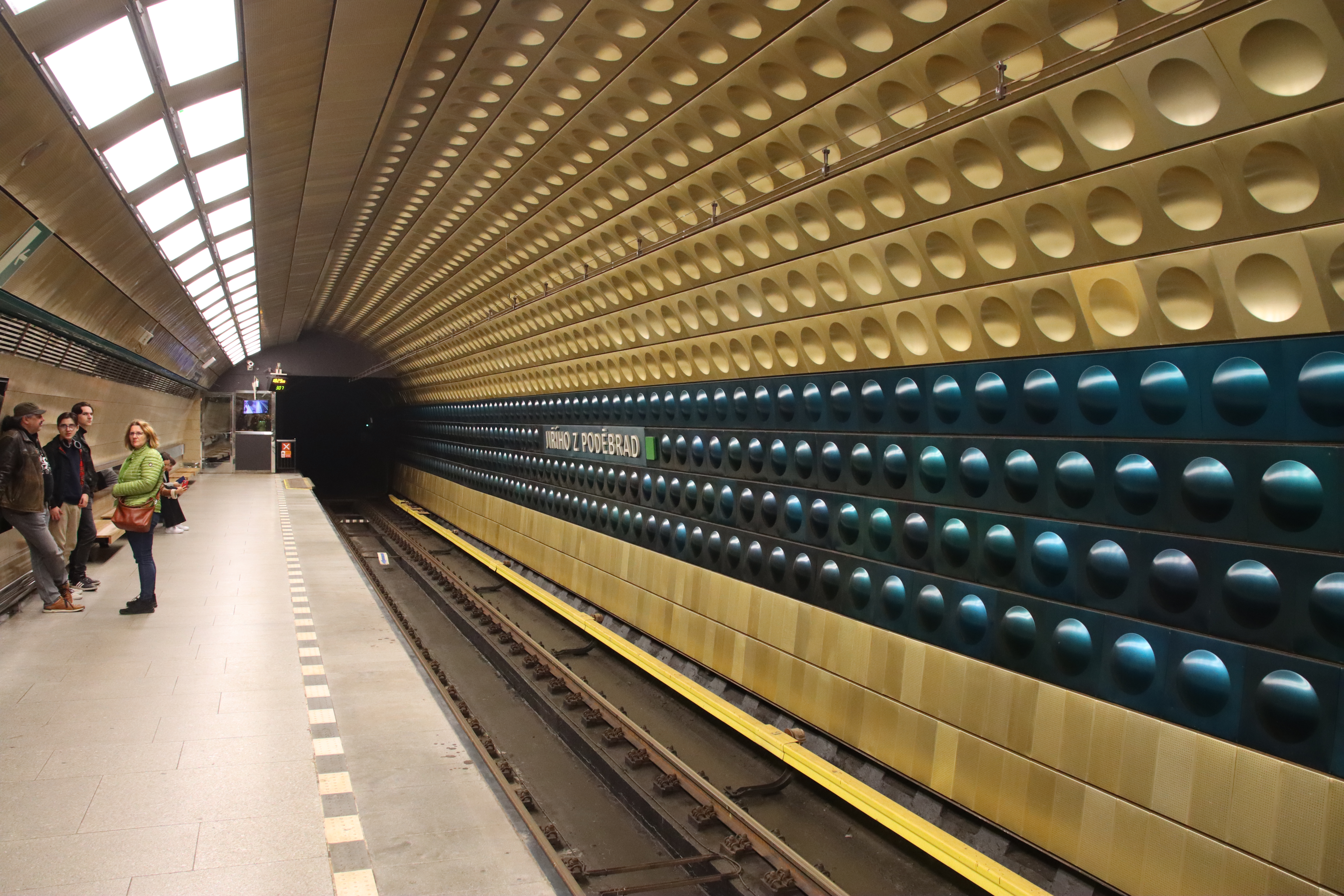
Jiřího z Poděbrad metro station after refurbishment

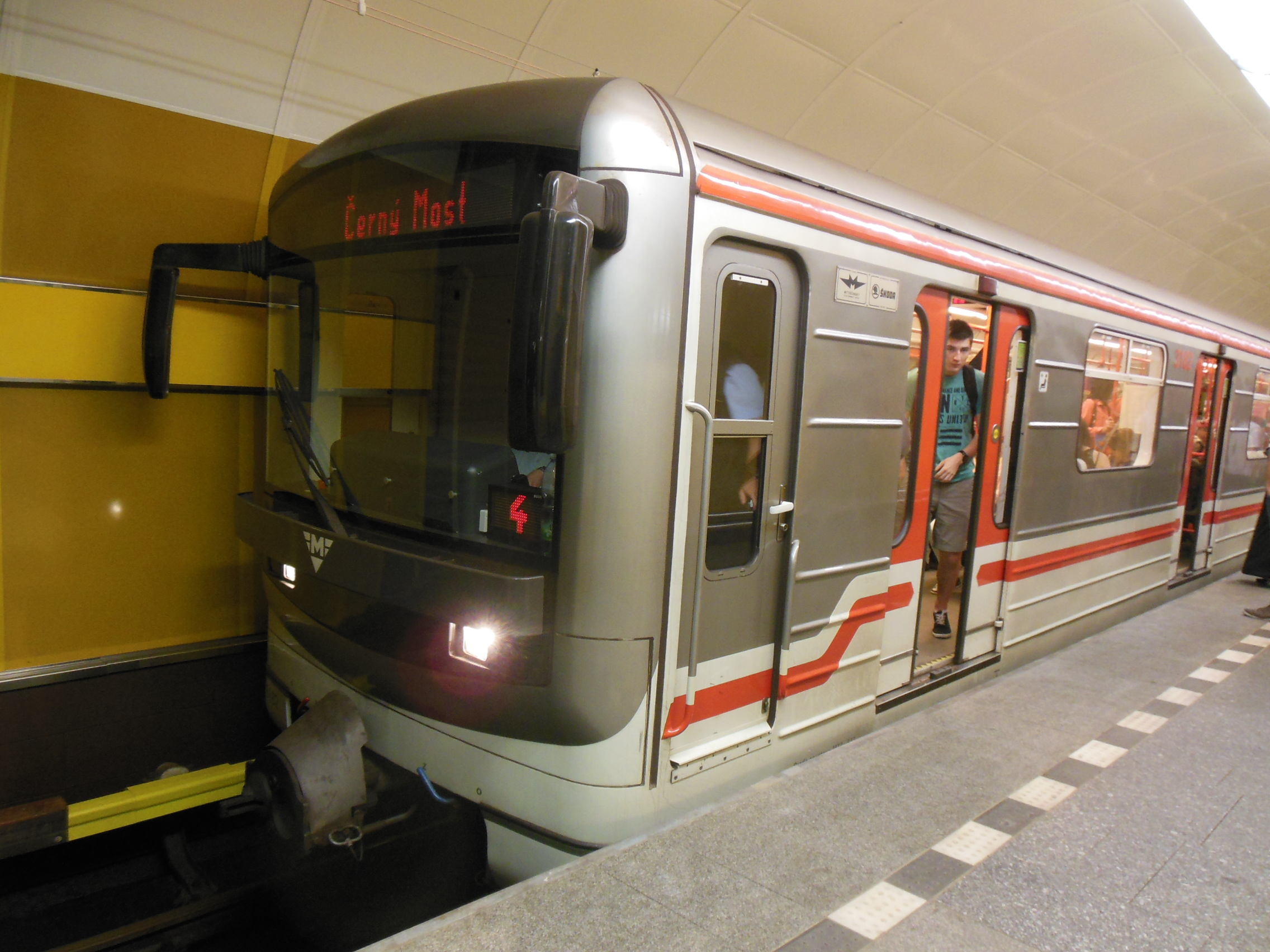
81-71M, used on Lines A and B

== Roads ==
Map of the Czech motorway network (2025)

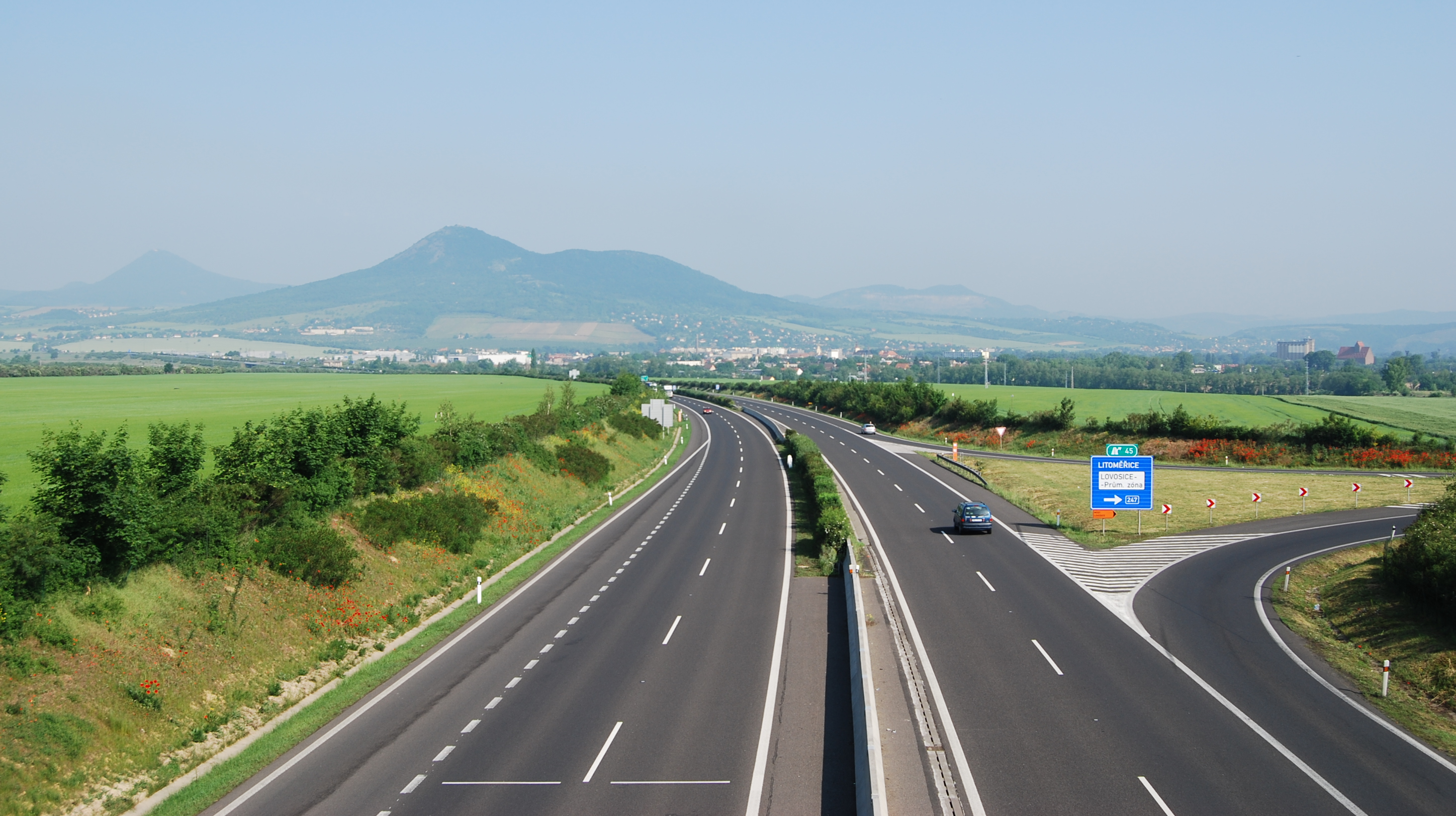
Lovosice junction (km 45)

The Czech Republic has, in total, 55,653 km (34,581 mi) of roads. It has 1,247 km (775 mi) of motorways. In the 1980s and 1990s there was a significant increase in passenger transport on the roads in the Czech Republic, which was associated with a sharp increase in the accident rate. Between 2007 and 2013, the death rate fell in every year, with a record low of 583 deaths in 2013, compared with the 1994 high of 1,473 casualties. Despite this however, the fatality rate per head of population is moderately high, comparable to the United States.

=== Highways ===
There are 2 main categories of roads forming the main network: Motorways and Highways. These roads are managed by the state-owned Directorate of Highways and Motorways of the Czech Republic – ŘSD, established in 1997. Among the first modern motorways in the Czech Republic was the motorway from Prague to the Slovak border through Brno whose construction was started on May 2, 1939.

Motorways are dual carriageways with tolls and a speed limit of 130 km/h. Highways can be single and dual carriageway with a speed limit of 90 km/h (dual carriageways are commonly signposted as Roads for motorcars with a speed limit of 110 km/h).

ŘSD currently manages and maintains 1,369 km of motorways (dálnice).

== Water ==
Czech Republic is naturally landlocked. The Vltava is the country's longest river, at 430 km. 358 km of the Elbe (Labe), which totals 1154 km, is also present in the country. An artificial waterway, nowadays used for recreation, is the Baťa Canal.

=== Ports and harbours ===
Děčín, Mělník, Prague, Ústí nad Labem, Moldauhafen in Hamburg (no longer operational, will be handed over to Germany in 2028)

== Air ==
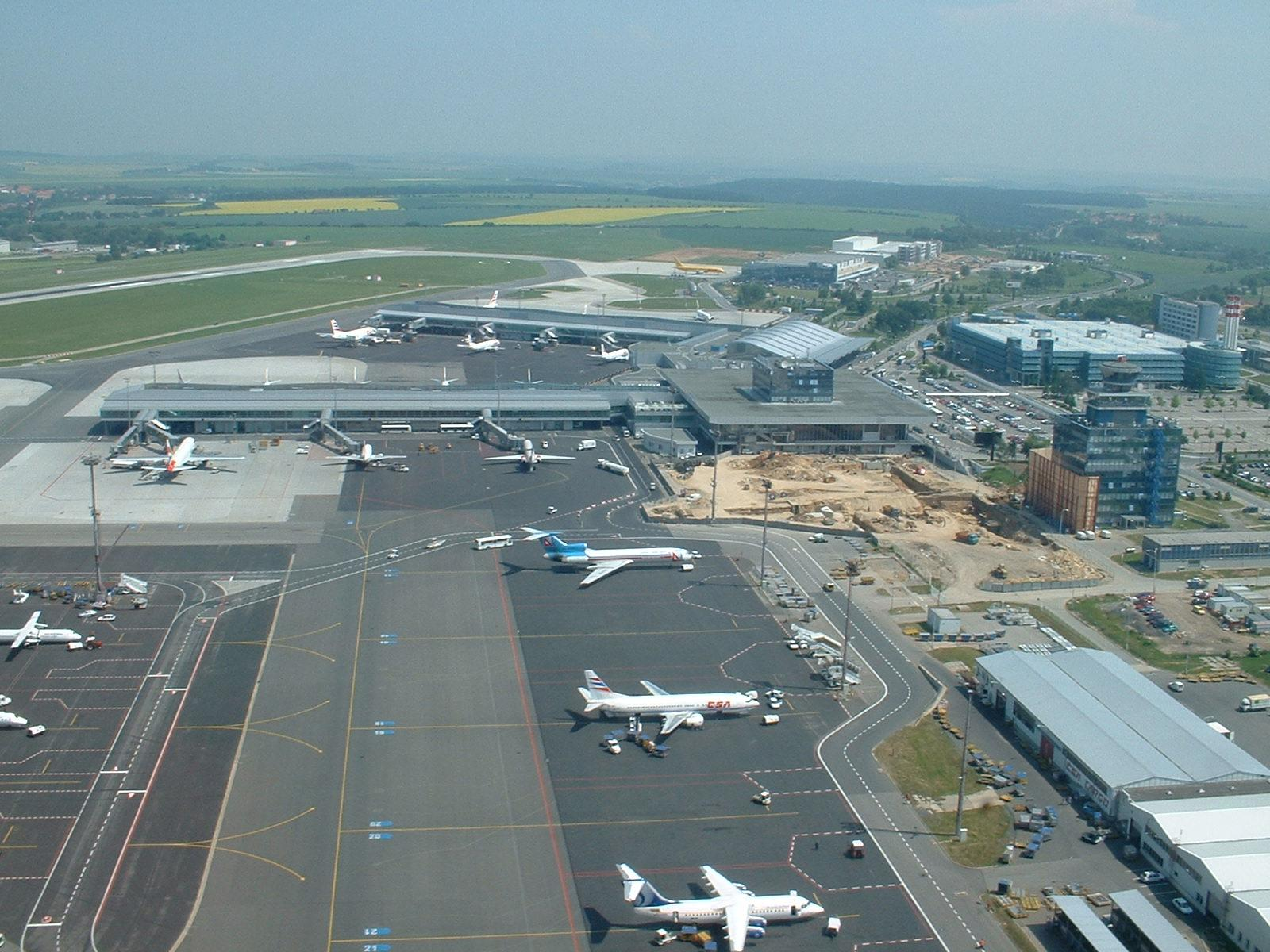
Václav Havel Airport Prague

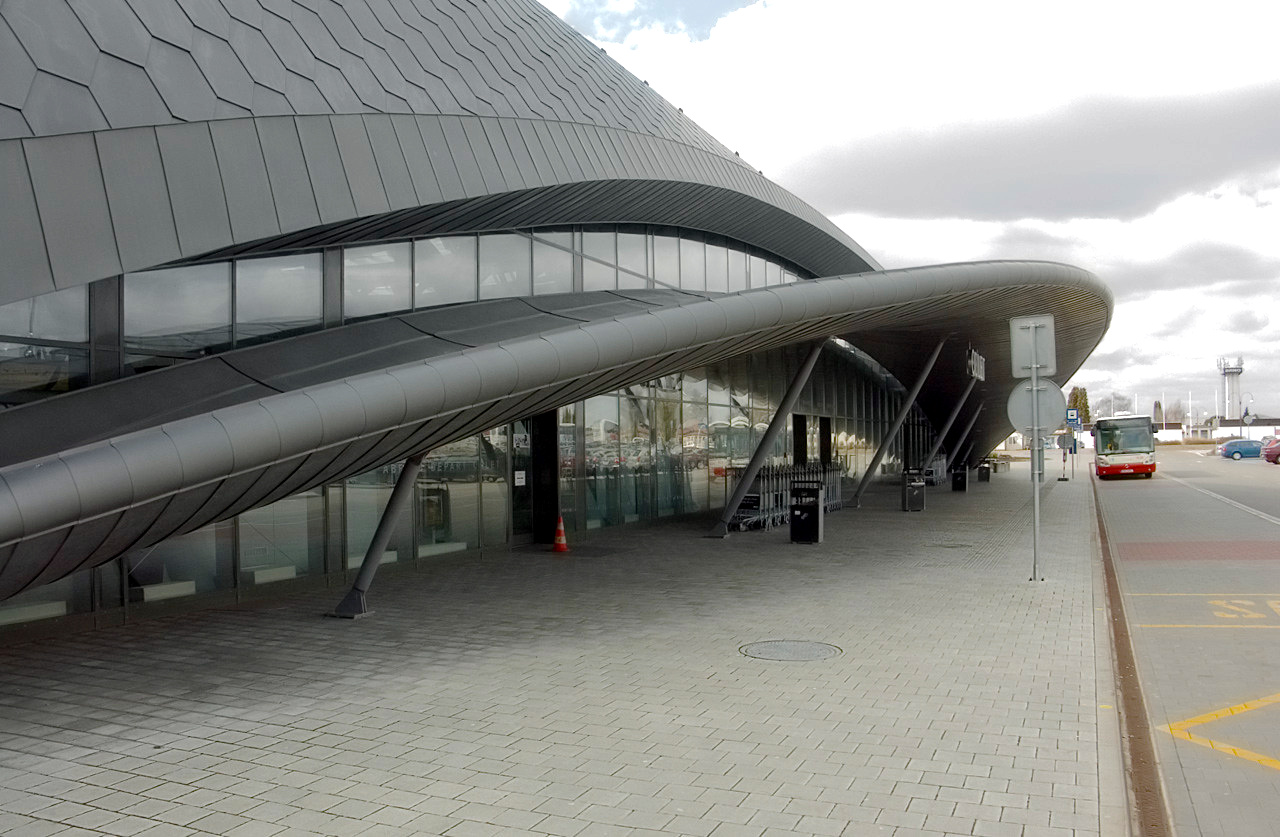
Brno-Tuřany Airport

In 2006, the Czech Republic had a total 121 airports. 46 of these airports had paved runways while 75 had unpaved runways. The largest and busiest airport in the Czech Republic is Václav Havel Airport Prague, opened in 1937. Other international airports include Brno-Tuřany Airport, Karlovy Vary Airport, Ostrava Leoš Janáček Airport, Pardubice Airport and České Budějovice Airport. Czech Airlines existed as the national flag carrier until their last flight in 2025; since then, Smartwings is the largest Czech airline.

=== Railway connections ===
Since 2015, Ostrava Airport has had a railway connection. It is the only airport with a railway connection in the Czech Republic (via line S4), but there are plans to connect Prague Airport to the railway network.

=== Heliports ===
2 (2006)

== See also ==
- Czech Republic
- List of airports in the Czech Republic
- Road signs in the Czech Republic
- European driving licence
