= List of airports in the Czech Republic =

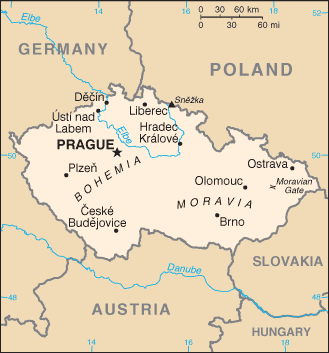
Map of the Czech Republic

This is a list of airports in the Czech Republic, grouped by type and sorted by location.

== Passenger statistics ==
Czech Republic's airports with number of passengers served in 2014 / 2015 years.

Rank	Airport	City	IATA / ICAO	2014	2015	2016	2017	Change
1.	Václav Havel Airport Prague	Prague	PRG / LKPR	11,149,926	12,030,928	13,074,517	15,415,001	▲7.9%
2.	Brno–Tuřany Airport	Brno	BRQ / LKTB	486,134	466,046	417,725	470,285	▼4.1%
3.	Leoš Janáček Airport Ostrava	Ostrava	OSR / LKMT	297,691	308,933	258,223	324,116	▲3.8%
4.	Karlovy Vary Airport	Karlovy Vary	KLV / LKKV	171,192	103,560			▼39.5%
5.	Pardubice Airport	Pardubice	PED / LKPD	150,056	59,260	31,174	88,490	▼60%
TOTAL				12,254,999	12,968,727			▲5.8%

== Airports ==
City served	Region	ICAO	IATA	Airport name
International airports
Brno	South Moravian	LKTB	BRQ	Brno-Tuřany Airport
České Budějovice	South Bohemian	LKCS	JCL	České Budějovice Airport
Karlovy Vary	Karlovy Vary	LKKV	KLV	Karlovy Vary Airport
Ostrava	Moravian-Silesian	LKMT	OSR	Leoš Janáček Airport Ostrava
Pardubice	Pardubice	LKPD	PED	Pardubice Airport
Prague	capital	LKPR	PRG	Václav Havel Airport
Domestic airports
Benešov	Central Bohemian	LKBE		Benešov Airport
Bohuňovice	Olomouc	LKBO		Bohuňovice Airport
Břeclav	South Moravian	LKBA		Břeclav Airport
Broumov	Hradec Králové	LKBR		Broumov Airport
Bubovice	Central Bohemian	LKBU		Bubovice Airport
Česká Lípa	Liberec	LKCE		Česká Lípa Airport
Cheb	Karlovy Vary	LKCB		Cheb Airport
Chomutov	Ústí nad Labem	LKCH		Chomutov Airport
Chotěboř	Vysočina	LKCT		Chotěboř Airport
Chrudim	Pardubice	LKCR		Chrudim Airport
Dvůr Králové nad Labem	Hradec Králové	LKDK		Dvůr Králové nad Labem Airport
Havlíčkův Brod	Vysočina	LKHB		Havlíčkův Brod Airport
Hodkovice nad Mohelkou	Liberec	LKHD		Hodkovice nad Mohelkou Airport
Holešov	Zlín	LKHO	GTW	Holešov Airport (closed 2009)
Hořice	Hradec Králové	LKHC		Hořice Airport
Hořovice	Central Bohemian	LKHV		Hořovice Airport
Hradec Králové	Hradec Králové	LKHK		Hradec Králové Airport
Hranice	Olomouc	LKHN		Hranice Airport
Jaroměř	Hradec Králové	LKJA		Jaroměř Airport
Jičín	Hradec Králové	LKJC		Jičín Airport
Jihlava	Vysočina	LKJI		Jihlava Airport
Jindřichův Hradec	South Bohemian	LKJH		Jindřichův Hradec Airport
Kladno	Central Bohemian	LKKL		Kladno Airport
Klatovy	Plzeň	LKKT		Klatovy Airport
Kolín	Central Bohemian	LKKO		Kolín Airport
Křižanov	Vysočina	LKKA		Křižanov Airport
Krnov	Moravian-Silesian	LKKR		Krnov Airport
Kyjov	South Moravian	LKKY		Kyjov Airport
Letkov	Plzeň	LKPL		Letkov Airport
Letňany (Prague 9)	capital	LKLT		Letňany Airport
Mariánské Lázně	Karlovy Vary	LKMR	MKA	Mariánské Lázně Airport
Medlánky	South Moravian	LKCM		Medlánky Airport
Mikulovice	Olomouc	LKMI		Mikulovice Airport
Mladá Boleslav	Central Bohemian	LKMB		Mladá Boleslav Airport
Mnichovo Hradiště	Central Bohemian	LKMH		Mnichovo Hradiště Airport
Moravská Třebová	Pardubice	LKMK		Moravská Třebová Airport
Most	Ústí nad Labem	LKMO		Most Airport
Nové Město nad Metují	Hradec Králové	LKNM		Nové Město Airport
Olomouc	Olomouc	LKOL	OLO	Olomouc Airport
Panenský Týnec	Ústí nad Labem	LKPC		Panenský Týnec Airport
Plasy	Plzeň	LKPS		Plasy Airport
Plzeň / Líně	Plzeň	LKLN		Plzeň-Líně Airport
Podhořany u Ronova	Pardubice	LKPN		Podhořany Airport
Polička	Pardubice	LKPA		Polička Airport
Příbram	Central Bohemian	LKPM		Příbram Airfield
Přibyslav	Vysočina	LKPI		Přibyslav Airport
Rakovník	Central Bohemian	LKRK		Rakovník Airfield
Raná	Ústí nad Labem	LKRA		Raná u Loun Airport
Roudnice	Central Bohemian	LKRO		Roudnice Airport
Sazená	Central Bohemian	LKSZ		Sazená Airport
Skuteč	Pardubice	LKSK		Skuteč Airport
Slaný	Central Bohemian	LKSN		Slaný Airport
Soběslav	South Bohemian	LKSO		Soběslav Airport
Staňkov	Plzeň	LKSA		Staňkov Airport
Strakonice	South Bohemian	LKST		Strakonice Airport
Strunkovice nad Blanicí	South Bohemian	LKSR		Strunkovice Airport
Šumperk	Olomouc	LKSU		Šumperk Airport
Tábor	South Bohemian	LKTA		Tábor Airport
Točná (Prague 12)	capital	LKTC		Točná Airport
Toužim	Karlovy Vary	LKTO		Toužim Airport
Uherské Hradiště	Zlín	LKKU	UHE	Kunovice Airport
Ústí nad Orlicí	Pardubice	LKUO		Ústí nad Orlicí Airport
Velké Poříčí	Hradec Králové	LKVP		Velké Poříčí Airport
Vlašim	Central Bohemian	LKVL		Vlašim Airport
Vodochody	Central Bohemian	LKVO	VOD	Vodochody Airport
Vrchlabí	Hradec Králové	LKVR		Vrchlabí Airport
Vysoké Mýto	Pardubice	LKVM		Vysoké Mýto Airport
Vyškov	South Moravian	LKVY		Vyškov Airport
Dolní Benešov - Zábřeh	Moravian-Silesian	LKZA	ZBE	Zábřeh Airport
Zbraslavice	Central Bohemian	LKZB		Zbraslavice Airport
Žamberk	Pardubice	LKZM		Žamberk Airport
Žatec - Macerka	Ústí nad Labem	LKZD		Žatec-Macerka Airport
Military airports
Čáslav	Central Bohemian	LKCV		Čáslav Airport
Náměšť nad Oslavou	Vysočina	LKNA		Náměšť Airport
Prague-Kbely (Prague 19)	capital	LKKB		Kbely Airport / Prague-Kbely Airport
Přerov	Olomouc	LKPO	PRV	Přerov Airport
Former airports
Bechyně	South Bohemian	LKBC		Bechyně Airport
Blatná	South Bohemian	LKBL		Blatná Airport
Ralsko	Liberec	LKHR		Hradčany Airport
Milovice	Central Bohemian	LKML		Milovice Airport
Tršice	Olomouc			Tršice Airport
Žatec - Staňkovice	Ústí nad Labem	LKZC		Žatec-Staňkovice Airport

== See also ==
- Czech Air Force
- Transport in the Czech Republic
- List of airlines of the Czech Republic
- List of airports by ICAO code: L#LK – Czech Republic
- Wikipedia: Airline destination lists: Europe#Czech Republic
