= Accolade (disambiguation) =

Accolade is a ceremony to confer knighthood.

Accolade may also refer to:

== Companies ==
- Accolade, Inc., an American video game developer and publisher
- Accolade Holding, a Czech investment group
- Accolade Wines, an Australia wine company

== Others ==
- Accolade (architecture) A sculptural embellishment of an arch
- Accolade (notation), a musical symbol
- Scholastic accolade
- Accolade (play), by Emlyn Williams
- Ulmus 'Morton', a hybrid elm cultivar sold using the trade name Accolade
- Curly braces {...}
- Operation Accolade war operation in Aegean Sea during World War II

== See also ==
- Accolate, also called zafirlukast, a chemical treatment for asthma
- The Accolade (disambiguation)
