= Medlánky Airfield =

Medlánky Airfield Letiště Medlánky
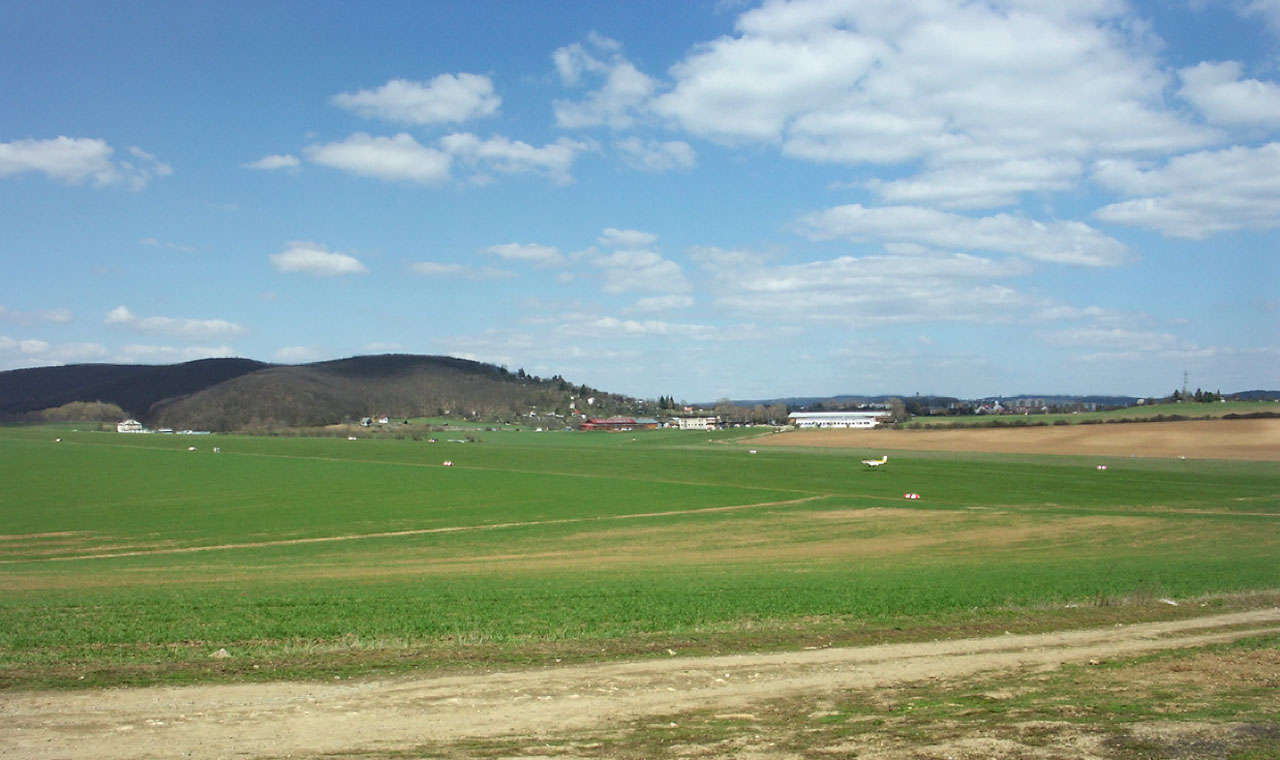
- IATA: -; ICAO: LKCM

Summary
- Airport type: Public
- Operator: Aeroklub Medlánky o.s.
- Serves: Brno
- Location: 6 kilometres (3.7 mi) north from Brno center
- Opened: 1924
- Elevation AMSL: 925 ft / 282 m
- Coordinates: 49°14′14″N 016°33′17″E
- Website: aeroklubmedlanky.cz
- Interactive map of Medlánky Airfield

Runways
Direction	Length		Surface
Direction	m	ft	Surface
16/34	920	3,018	Grass

Medlánky airfield (Czech: Letiště Medlánky) (ICAO: LKCM) is a public aerodrome used primarily for recreational activities and ultralight general aviation. The airfield is situated in the north of Brno, a city in Czech Republic that is also home to Brno-Tuřany International Airport to the south. The airfield is named after the Brno city district of Medlánky, where the administrative and maintenance facilities are located, although its actual manoeuvring area is located in the city district of Komín.
