= The Accolade =

The Accolade may refer to:

- The Accolade (Leighton), a 1901 pre-Raphaelite painting by Edmund Leighton
- The AccoLade (band), an all-girl rock band from Jeddah
- "The Accolade", a 1997 song by Symphony X from The Divine Wings of Tragedy
- The Accolade, a student newspaper of Centennial High School in Roswell, Georgia

== See also ==
- Accolade (disambiguation)
