= Broumov Airport =

Broumov Airport Letiště Broumov
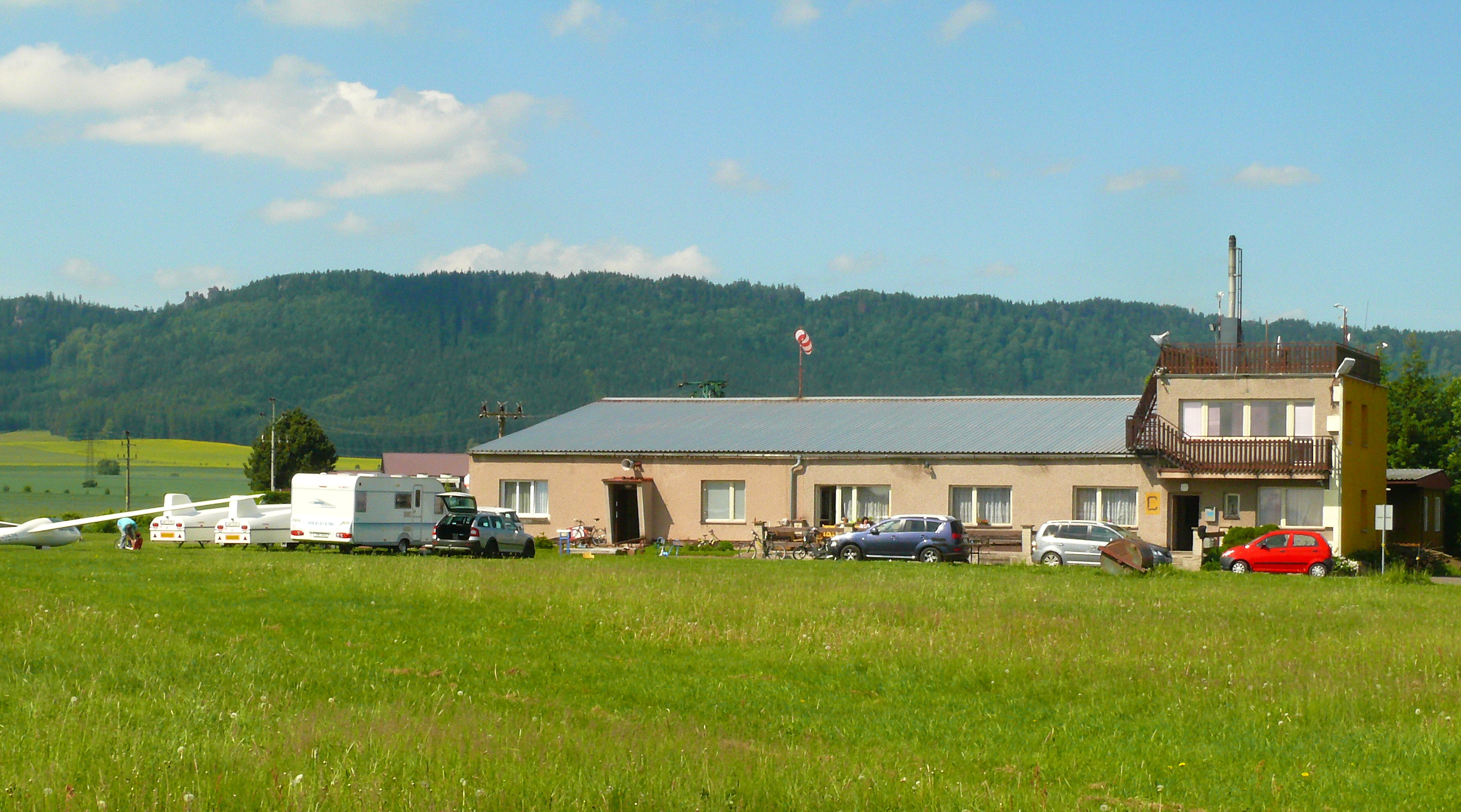
- IATA: none; ICAO: LKBR

Summary
- Airport type: Public
- Serves: Broumov
- Location: Broumov, Czech Republic
- Elevation AMSL: 1,342 ft / 409 m
- Coordinates: 50°34′N 16°21′E
- Website: https://www.lkbr.cz/

Map
- Location within Czech Republic

Runways
Direction	Length		Surface
Direction	ft	m	Surface
	3,000	914	Unpaved

Broumov Airport (Czech: Letiště Broumov; ICAO airport code LKBR) is an airport in Broumov in the Czech Republic.
