= Brno-Tuřany Airport =

Brno-Tuřany Airport Letiště Brno-Tuřany

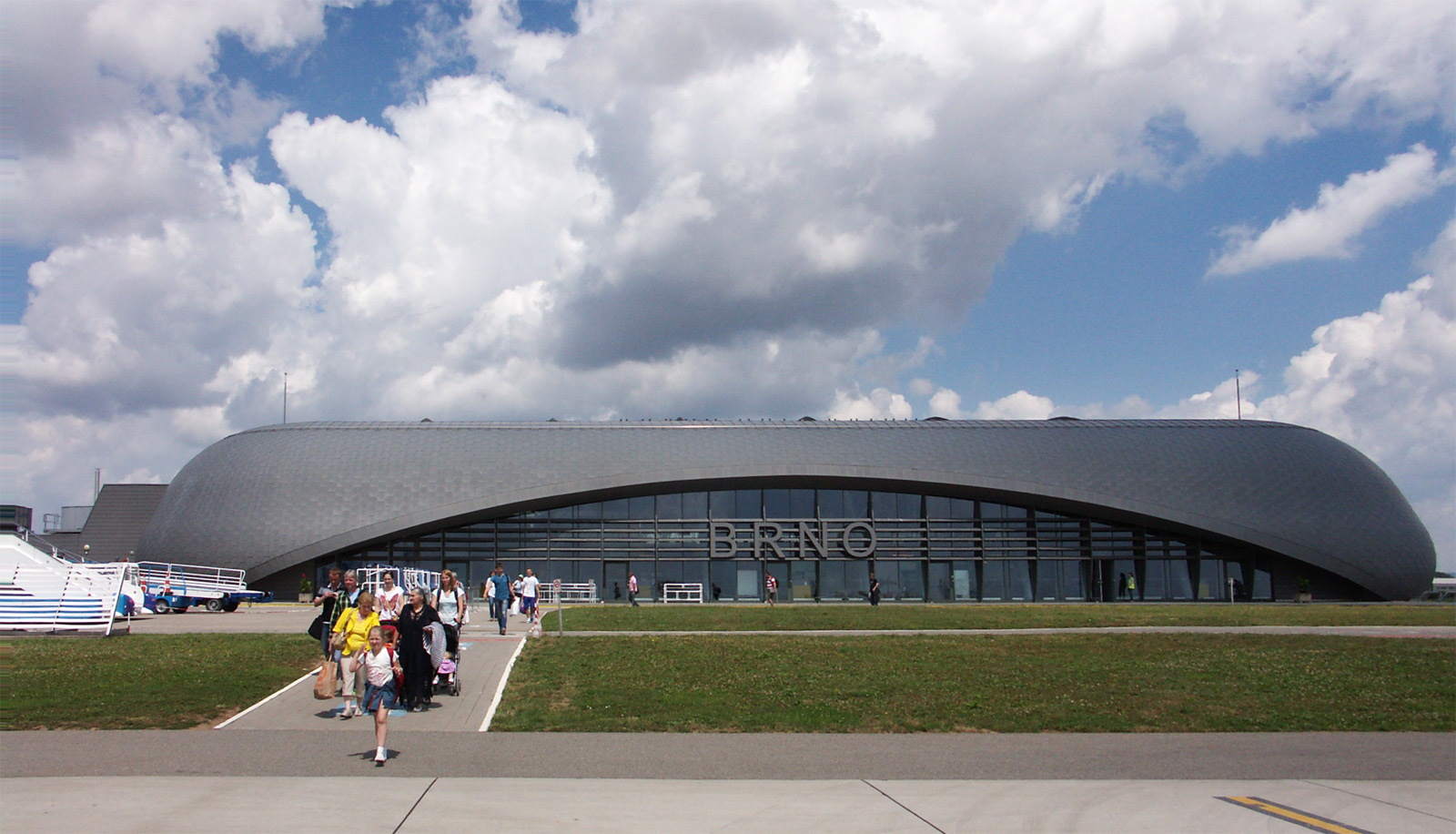
- IATA: BRQ; ICAO: LKTB

Summary
- Airport type: Public
- Owner: South Moravian Region
- Operator: Letiště Brno a.s
- Serves: Brno
- Location: Brno
- Opened: 1954; 72 years ago
- Time zone: CET (UTC+01:00)
  - Summer (DST): CEST (UTC+02:00)
- Elevation AMSL: 770 ft / 235 m
- Coordinates: 49°09′05″N 16°41′40″E
- Website: www.brno-airport.cz/en/

Map

Runways
| Direction | Length | | Surface |
| Direction | ft | m | Surface |
|---|---|---|---|
| 09/27 | 8,694 | 2,650 | Concrete |
| 08/26 | 2,624 | 800 | Grass |

Statistics (2024)
- Passengers: 749 153
- Passenger change 23–24: ▲9%
- Cargo: 11 803 t
- Cargo change 23–24: ▲1%

Brno-Tuřany Airport (Czech: Letiště Brno-Tuřany) (IATA: BRQ, ICAO: LKTB) is an airport in Brno, Czech Republic. It serves mainly the southeastern part of the Czech Republic.

In 2024, 749,153 passengers passed through the Brno-Tuřany passenger terminal, making it the second busiest airport in the Czech Republic.

== Location ==
Brno-Tuřany Airport is located about 7.5 km (5 mi) southeast of Brno's city centre. The airport is about 120 km (75 mi) from other international airports, such as Vienna Airport and Bratislava Airport and smaller international airports in Ostrava and Pardubice.

== History ==
=== Early years ===
The airport was built during the 1950s as a replacement for the old Brno airport located in Slatina (northeast of Tuřany airport). In 1967, a new departure hall construction began. During the 1980s, the airport was handed over for use by the Czechoslovak air force, and civil operations were reduced to a minimum. Civil flights were operated during exhibitions and fairs taking place at Brno Exhibition Centre. In 1986, the new departure hall and related facilities were completed. After the fall of communism in 1989, the airport returned to civil use, and was operated by the state-owned Czech Airport Authority.

=== Latest developments ===
At present, the regional government of the South Moravian Region owns the airport, and it is operated by a private company, Brno Airport Ltd. In November 2017, Brno Airport Ltd. was bought by the investment group Accolade.

The regional government of the South Moravian Region entered negotiations on new routes, namely to Rome, Barcelona, Milan, and Lviv, in late 2017. As a result, a new airline company, Blue Air Moravia, was established owned jointly by city of Brno and the regional authority (35%) and the parent company Blue Air (65%), headquartered in Bucharest, Romania. However, this was cancelled.

== Facilities ==
The terminal consists of two concourses. The new departure hall that opened in 2006 is capable of handling 1,000 passengers per hour. The building was designed by architect Petr Parolek and is considered to be one of the most significant projects of Czech contemporary architecture and a striking example of the growing trend of organic architecture.

The airport offers some bars, a duty-free shop, car rentals, ATM and exchange office. The airport is covered by a free WiFi.

Cargo airlines such as ASL Airlines Belgium, Volga-Dnepr, or Antonov Design Bureau often use Brno Airport as one of their stopover points. The airport handled 9,679 tons of freight in 2009. Plans for building a new cargo terminal and industry zone are in talks of realization, which could take place in the near future.

== Airlines and destinations ==
The following airlines operate flights to and from Brno:

| Airlines | Destinations |
|---|---|
| Air Montenegro | Seasonal: Podgorica, Tivat |
| Freebird Airlines | Seasonal charter: Antalya |
| Neos | Seasonal charter: Mauritius, Phuket |
| Ryanair | London–Stansted, Málaga; Seasonal: Bergamo |
| Sky Express | Seasonal charter: Chania |
| Smartwings | Seasonal: Burgas, Corfu, Fuerteventura, Heraklion, Hurghada, Kos, Lamezia Terme, Marsa Alam, Palma de Mallorca, Rhodes, Tenerife–South, Varna, Zakynthos; Seasonal charter: Almería, Barcelona, Bodrum, Comiso, Dalaman, Djerba, Enfidha, Funchal, İzmir, Kavala, Larnaca, Marsa Matrouh, Monastir, Murcia, Preveza/Lefkada, Taba, Tirana, Volos |
| Tailwind Airlines | Seasonal charter: Antalya |

=== Cargo ===
| Airlines | Destinations |
|---|---|
| ASL Airlines | Paris–Charles de Gaulle, Prague |

== Statistics ==
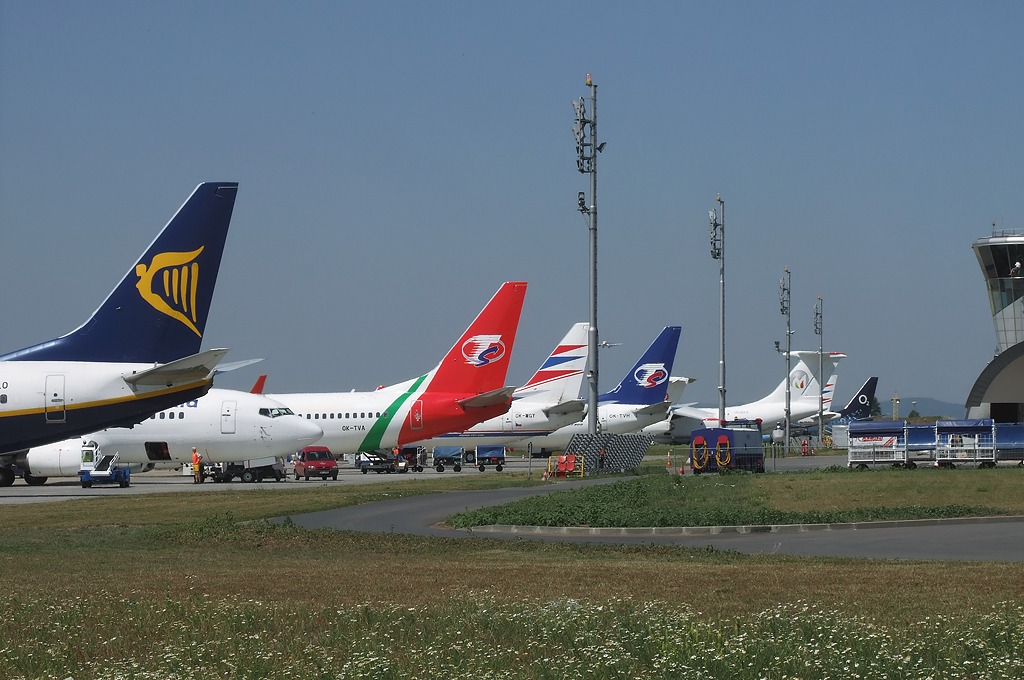
Middle apron

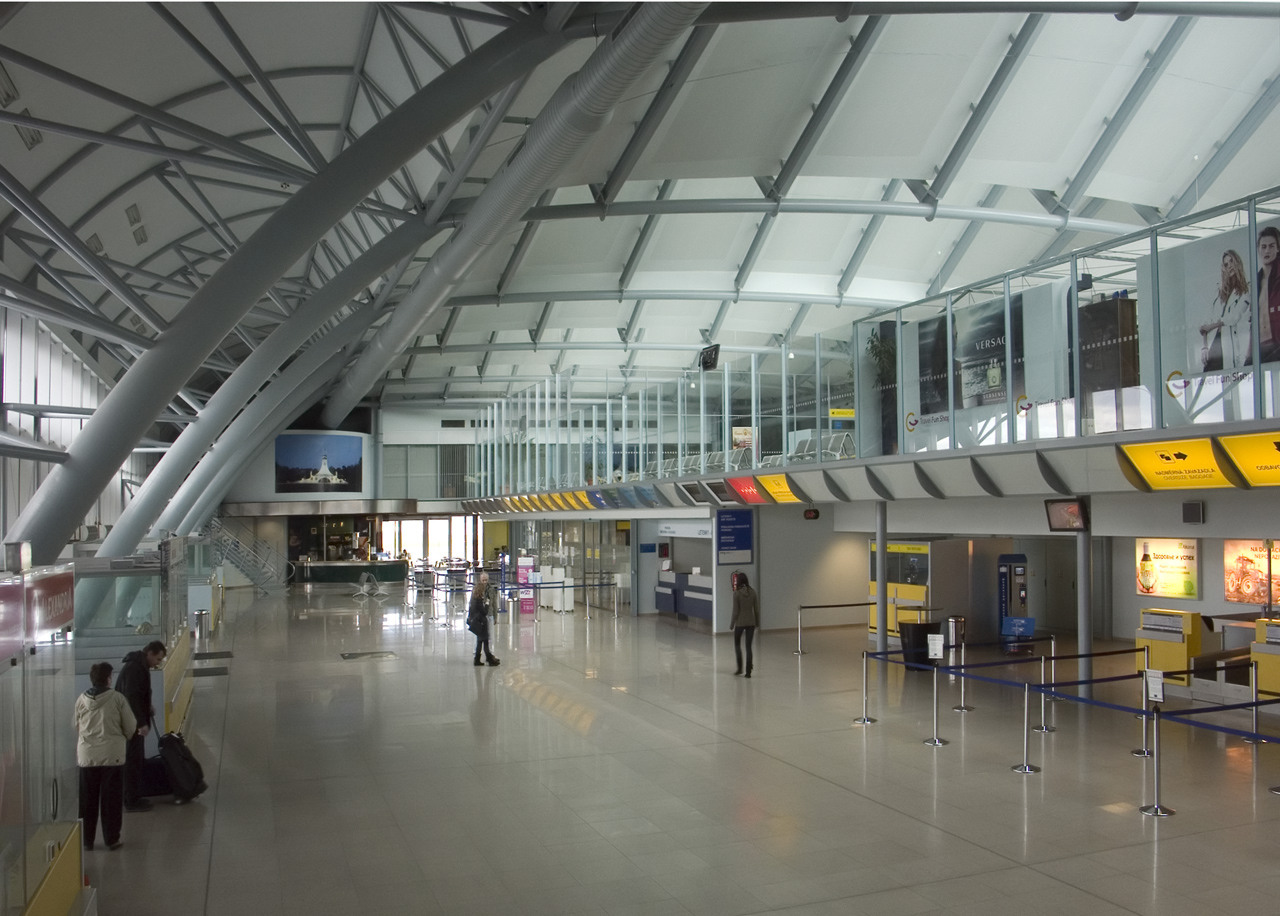
Entrance hall of Terminal 1

| Year | Passengers handled | Passenger % Change | Cargo (tonnes) | Cargo % Change | Aircraft movements | % Change |
|---|---|---|---|---|---|---|
| 2006 | 393,686 | | 3,144 | | 20,105 | |
| 2007 | 415,276 | ▲10.55 | 3,055 | ▼ -2.87 | 22,893 | ▲13.87 |
| 2008 | 506,174 | ▲21.89 | 6,273 | ▲105.34 | 29,303 | ▲28.00 |
| 2009 | 440,850 | ▼ -12.90 | 9,679 | ▲54.30 | 30,513 | ▲4.13 |
| 2010 | 396,589 | ▼ -10.04 | 5,326 | ▼ -44.97 | 25,027 | ▼ -17.98 |
| 2011 | 557,952 | ▲40.69 | 4,625 | ▼ -13.16 | 26,837 | ▲7.23 |
| 2012 | 534,968 | ▼ -4.12 | 3,828 | ▼ -17.23 | 29,885 | ▲11.36 |
| 2013 | 463,023 | ▼ -13.45 | 4,078 | ▲6.53 | 27,803 | ▼ -6.97 |
| 2014 | 486,134 | ▲4.99 | 4,530 | ▲11.08 | 32,216 | ▲15.87 |
| 2015 | 466,046 | ▼ -4.13 | 4,613 | ▲1.83 | 38,264 | ▲18.77 |
| 2016 | 417,725 | ▼ -10.37 | 4,150 | ▼ -10.04 | 40,073 | ▲4.73 |
| 2017 | 470,285 | ▲12.51 | 3,893 | ▼ -10.84 | 48,337 | ▲20.62 |
| 2018 | 500,727 | ▲6.47 | 3,750 | ▼ -3.67 | 41,172 | ▼ -17.40 |
| 2019 | 543,633 | ▲8.56 | 3,529 | ▼ -5.89 | 34,388 | ▼ -16.47 |
| 2020 | 86,089 | ▼ -84.16 | 4,147 | ▲17.51 | 26,666 | ▼ -22.45 |
| 2021 | 186,368 | ▲116.48 | 12,890 | ▲210.82 | 23,626 | ▼ -11.40 |
| 2022 | 471,811 | ▲153.16 | 11,222 | ▼ -12.94 | 24,315 | ▲2.91 |
| 2023 | 686,867 | ▲45.58 | 11,653 | ▲3.84 | 25,064 | ▲3.08 |
| 2024 | 749,153 | ▲9.07 | 11,803 | ▲1.29 | 25,899 | ▲3.33 |

== Ground transport ==
The airport is located within city limits, next to the D1 highway which runs from Prague to Bohumín through Brno.

It is connected to the public transport network by daytime bus route E76, and night route N89, which both run to Brno hlavní nádraží (main railway station). The journey takes 14–16 minutes.

== See also ==
- List of airports in the Czech Republic
