= Karlovy Vary Airport =

Karlovy Vary Airport Letiště Karlovy Vary

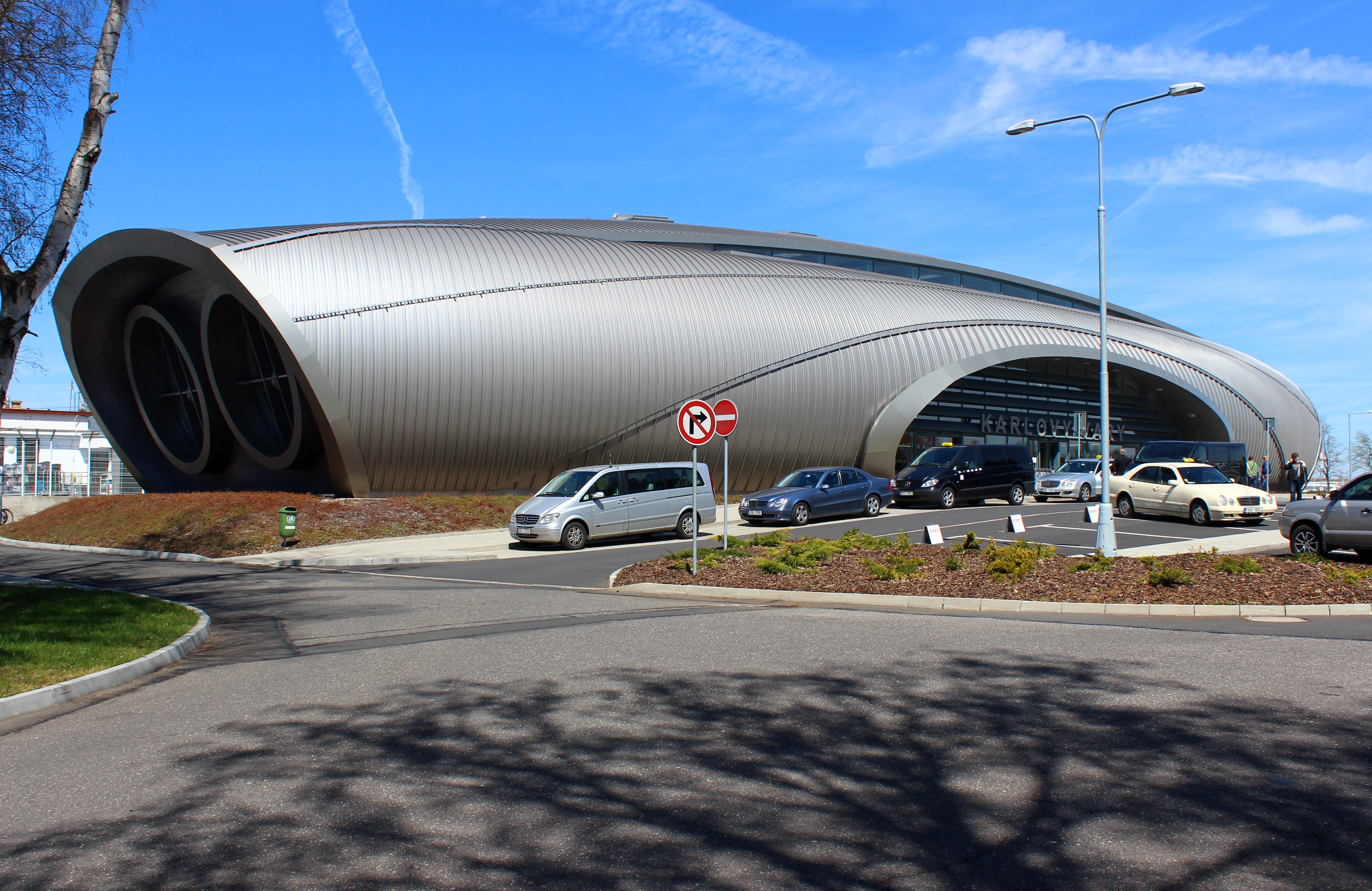
- IATA: KLV; ICAO: LKKV

Summary
- Airport type: Public
- Owner: Karlovy Vary Region
- Operator: Airport Karlovy Vary
- Location: Olšová Vrata
- Opened: 1929
- Elevation AMSL: 1,989 ft / 606 m
- Coordinates: 50°12′11″N 12°54′54″E
- Website: airport-k-vary.cz

Map
- Location of airport in Czech Republic

Runways
Direction	Length		Surface
Direction	ft	m	Surface
11/29	7,053	2,150	Asphalt concrete
12/30	3,280	1,000	Grass

Statistics (2023)
- Passengers: 12,861
- Passenger change 22–23: ▲85%

Karlovy Vary Airport (Czech: Letiště Karlovy Vary) (IATA: KLV, ICAO: LKKV) is the airport of Karlovy Vary in western Bohemia. It is located in the village of Olšová Vrata, 6 km southeast of the city centre and is the fourth-busiest airport in the Czech Republic. The airport handled 104,469 passengers in 2013, which was a record high.

== History ==
Plans were announced in 2011 to build a new departure hall at the airport, at an estimated expense of 30 million crowns. 99% of passengers using the airport in 2012 were Russian.

== Airlines and destinations ==
The following airlines operate regular scheduled and charter flights at Karlovy Vary Airport:

Airlines	Destinations
BH Air	Seasonal charter: Burgas
Smartwings	Seasonal charter: Antalya
Uzbekistan Airways	Seasonal charter: Tashkent

== Statistics ==
Year	Passengers handled	Passenger % Change	Aircraft movements	% Change
2004	38,704		6,617	
2005	37,313	▼3.59%	7,865	▲18.85%
2006	34,975	▼0.72%	5,111	▼35.74%
2007	64,641	▲85.28%	6,801	▲33.06%
2008	81,720	▲26.42%	5,575	▼18.03%
2009	68,369	▼16.34%	7,632	▲36.95%
2010	70,903	▲2.23%	6,936	▼9.11%
2011	99,014	▲39.76%	6,891	▼0.65%
2012	103,682	▲4.70%	5,826	▼15.41%
2013	104,469	▲0.76%	5,342	▼8.32%
2014	85,596	▼17.13%	5,824	▲9.01%
2015	51,780	▼39.59%	5,816	▼0.14%
2016	25,235	▼51.26%	5,008	▼13.89%
2017	21,404	▼15.18%	5,702	▲13.85%
2018	45,003	▲110.25%	5,480	▼3.89%
2019	62,234	▲38.28%	7,736	▲41.16%
2020	17,234	▼72.30%	15,414	▲99.25%
2021	586	▼96.59%	8,029	▼47.91%
2022	6,946	▲1,085.32%	10,892	▲35.65%
2023	13,855	▲85.15%	14,337	▲31.62%
2024	37,990	▲174.20%	17,894	▲24.81%

== Ground transportation ==
From Karlovy Vary or Prague: The airport is 6 km southeast of the centre of Karlovy Vary. Turn from the road I/6 (E48) near Karlovy Vary Golf Resort and continue 3,5 km to the airport. Public transport to the airport is maintained seven times per day by city bus Nr. 8. The nearest major international airport is Prague Václav Havel Airport approx. 90 km to the east.

== See also ==
- List of airports in Czech Republic
