= Accolade Holding =

Czech investment company

Accolade Holding a.s.
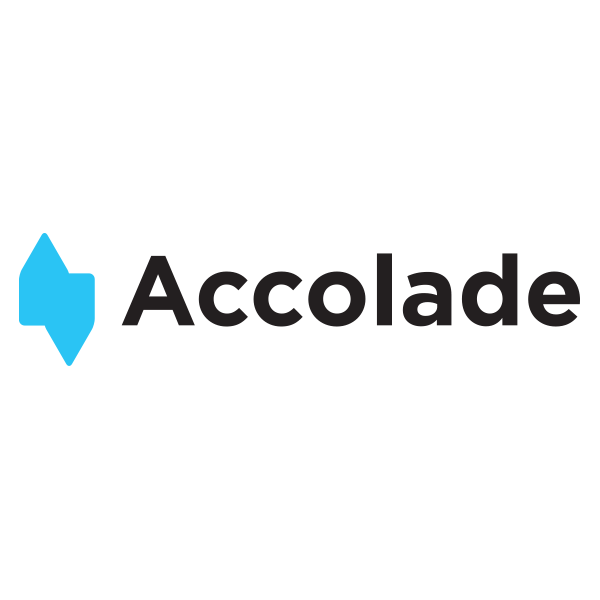
- Type: joint-stock company
- Industry: Real estate investment trusts
- Genre: Industrial properties
- Founded: 2011
- Founder: Milan Kratina
- Headquarters: Prague, Czech Republic
- Area served: Central Europe
- Key people: Milan Kratina (CEO, co-owner); Zdeněk Šoustal (co-owner)
- Products: Industrial real estate
- Net income: 1,596,196,000 Czech koruna (2021)
- Total assets: 7,350,000,000 Czech koruna (2021)
- Website: http://www.accolade.cz/

Accolade Holding, a.s. (Accolade Group) is a Czech investment company operating in six European countries, providing infrastructure for European businesses, predominantly in the e-commerce, processing industry and logistics sectors.

The company owns a network of 26 industrial parks located in the Czech Republic, Poland, Germany, and Slovakia, as well as (since 2017) Brno-Tuřany Airport. In addition, the company provides premises for the development and certification of autonomous vehicles near the West Bohemian town of Stříbro.

== History ==
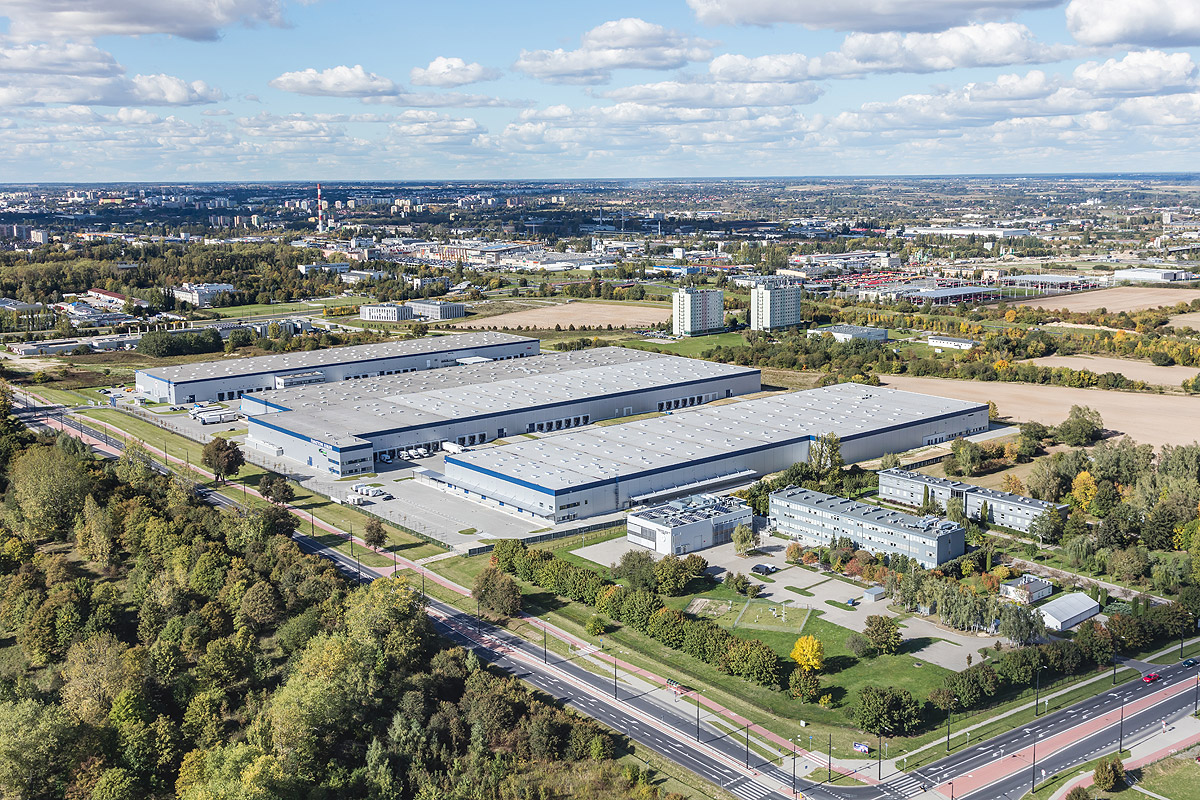
Park Lublin, Poland

Accolade Group was established in the Czech Republic in 2011 and is owned by Milan Kratina and Zdeněk Šoustal. In 2014, the company expanded to Poland, where many of their parks are built on former brownfield land. In the same year, the company established an investment fund for industrial properties, Accolade Fund Sicav. As of 2025, the company owned a portfolio of 62 industrial parks across Europe, with a total area of about 3.5 million square metres and a reported value of €3 billion. Since 2017, Accolade has been the owner of Brno-Tuřany Airport, the second busiest airport in the Czech Republic. The company also has plans to provide a proving ground for the development and certification of autonomous vehicles near the West Bohemian town of Stříbro.

In 2018, Accolade Group owned and leased 750,000 sqm of industrial land for rent. In 2019, the portfolio of their commercial properties was 1.3 million sqm, with a value of just under €1,134 billion.

The company's commercial property portfolio is mostly in the Czech Republic and Poland. Since 2018, Accolade has moved into the industrial property market in Germany, and since 2019 in Slovakia. In March 2020, the company was ranked #56 on a list of the fastest-growing companies in Europe by the Financial Times, ranking in the top five in the real-estate sector and #1 in the Czech Republic.

== Parks ==
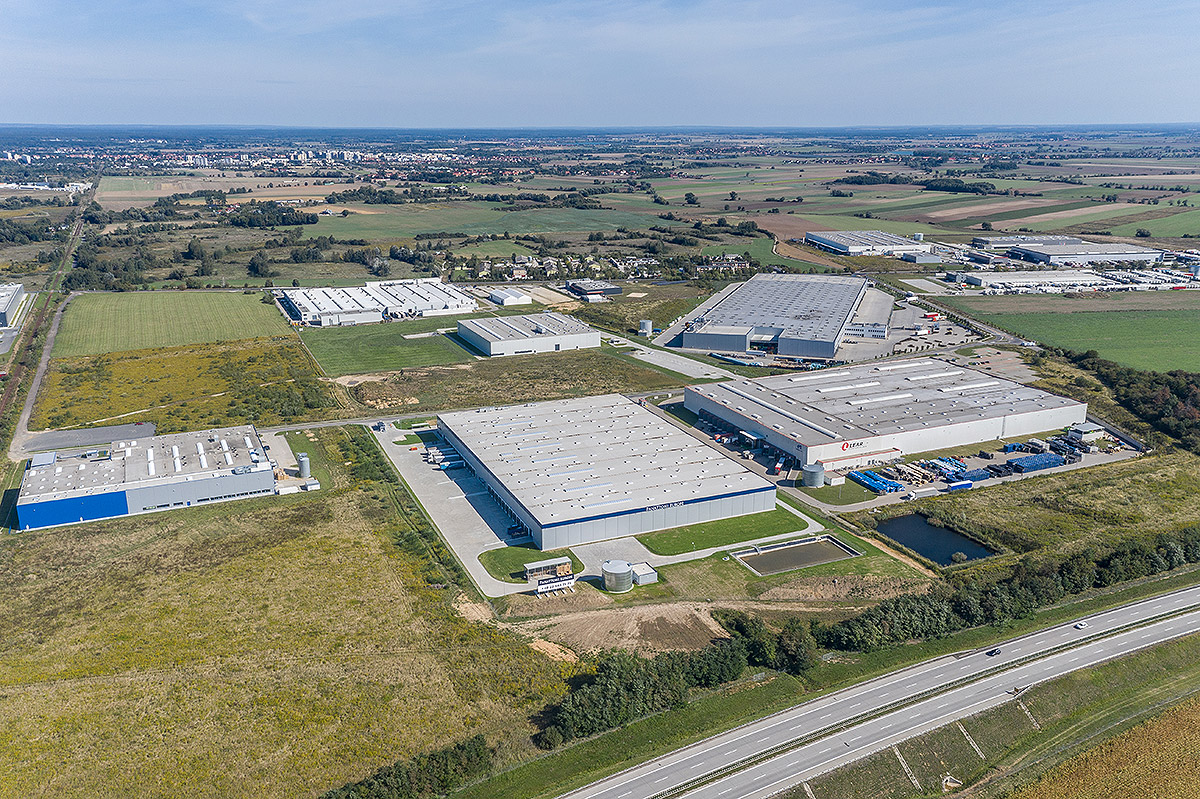
Build-to-suit warehouse Legnica, Poland

As of 2020, Accolade Group operated 29 industrial parks.

Country	Czech Republic	Poland	Germany	Slovakia	Total
Number of parks	13	10	2	1	26
Total size in sqm	878,356	823,951	27,568	37,139	1,767,014
Monetary value in mil. EUR	625.7	467.5	37.1	3.9	1,134.2
Completed projects in sqm	463,346	490,414	7,512	X	961,272
Projects under the construction in sqm	118,659	122,820	20,056	16,767	278,302
Planned projects in sqm	296,351	210,717	X	20,372	527,440

== Sustainability and CSR ==
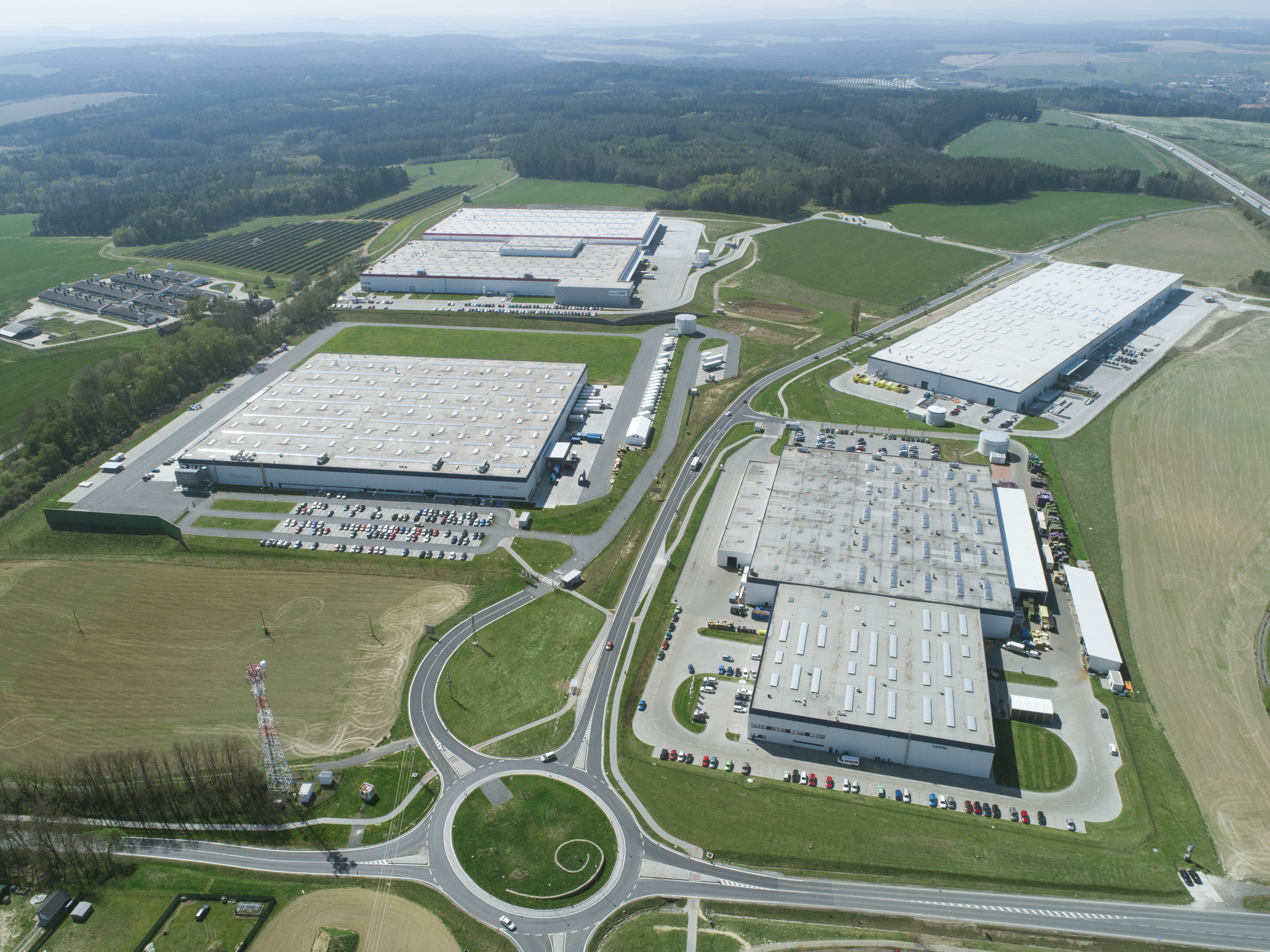
Panattoni Park Stříbro

All of Accolade's buildings in the Czech Republic are BREEAM-certified as at least "Very Good", and in Poland as "Good", relating to the level of environmental friendliness, working conditions for employees, and energy self-sufficiency of the building. The building created by Accolade for cosmetics distribution centre Estée Launder in Cheb industrial zone, operated by DHL, is certified as BREEAM Excellent, among the top-rated buildings in Central Europe. Much of Accolade's promotional material emphasises its environmental credentials.

For several years, the company has been providing support for sheltered housing and social therapeutic workshops by non-profit organisation Mela. They also sponsor scientific projects (Neuron Awards), cultural events (Karlovy Vary International Film Festival), sports, and regional economic initiatives.

Accolade often uses former brownfield land for its projects; the proportion of former brownfield land in its portfolio is 53% in Poland and 22% in the Czech Republic. A further revitalization project is planned for Bochum in Germany, where a new development is due to replace a former Opel factory.
