= Tršice =

- Municipality
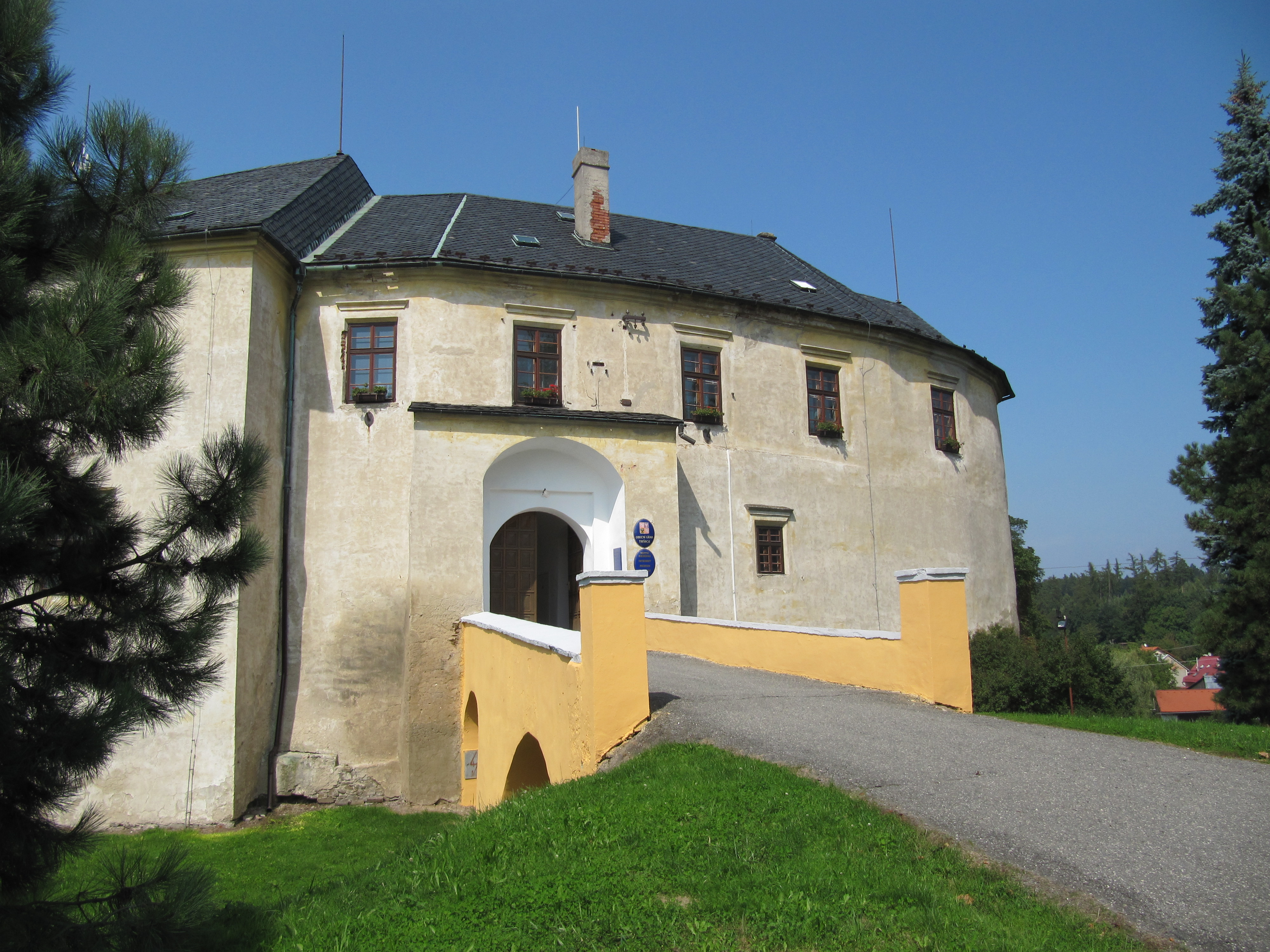
- Tršice Castle, today the municipal office

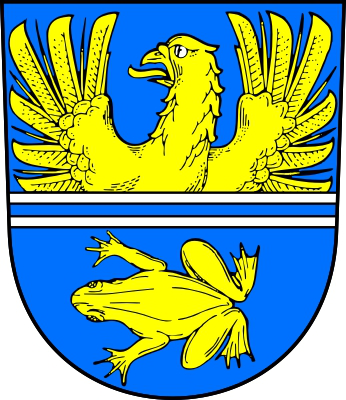
- Coat of arms

- Location in the Czech Republic
- Coordinates: 49°32′28″N 17°25′37″E
- Country: Czech Republic
- Region: Olomouc
- District: Olomouc
- First mentioned: 1282

Area
  - Total: 25.04 km^{2} (9.67 sq mi)
- Elevation: 324 m (1,063 ft)

Population (2026-01-01)
  - Total: 1,889
  - Density: 75.44/km^{2} (195.4/sq mi)
- Time zone: UTC+1 (CET)
  - Summer (DST): UTC+2 (CEST)
- Postal code: 783 57
- Website: www.trsice.cz

Tršice is a municipality and village in Olomouc District in the Olomouc Region of the Czech Republic. It has about 1,900 inhabitants.

== Administrative division ==
Tršice consists of six municipal parts (in brackets population according to the 2021 census):

- Tršice (1,061)
- Hostkovice (235)
- Lipňany (118)
- Přestavlky (112)
- Vacanovice (153)
- Zákřov (82)

== Geography ==
Tršice is located about 12 kilometres (7 mi) southeast of Olomouc. It lies in the Nízký Jeseník range. The Olešnice Stream flows through the municipality. Tršice Reservoir is built on this stream.

== History ==
The first written mention of Tršice is from 1282. The Gothic fortress in Tršice was rebuilt into a Renaissance residence in 1568.

Many people in this village helped to hide a Jewish family each during World War II. Six of them were given the honorific title of Righteous Among the Nations.

== Demographics ==
Historical population

| Year | Pop. | ±% |
|---|---|---|
| 1869 | 1,807 | — |
| 1880 | 1,889 | +4.5% |
| 1890 | 2,037 | +7.8% |
| 1900 | 2,202 | +8.1% |
| 1910 | 2,252 | +2.3% |

| Year | Pop. | ±% |
|---|---|---|
| 1921 | 2,194 | −2.6% |
| 1930 | 2,184 | −0.5% |
| 1950 | 1,827 | −16.3% |
| 1961 | 1,877 | +2.7% |
| 1970 | 1,738 | −7.4% |

| Year | Pop. | ±% |
|---|---|---|
| 1980 | 1,680 | −3.3% |
| 1991 | 1,494 | −11.1% |
| 2001 | 1,545 | +3.4% |
| 2011 | 1,576 | +2.0% |
| 2021 | 1,761 | +11.7% |

Source: Censuses

== Transport ==
There are no railways or major roads passing through the municipality.

== Sights ==
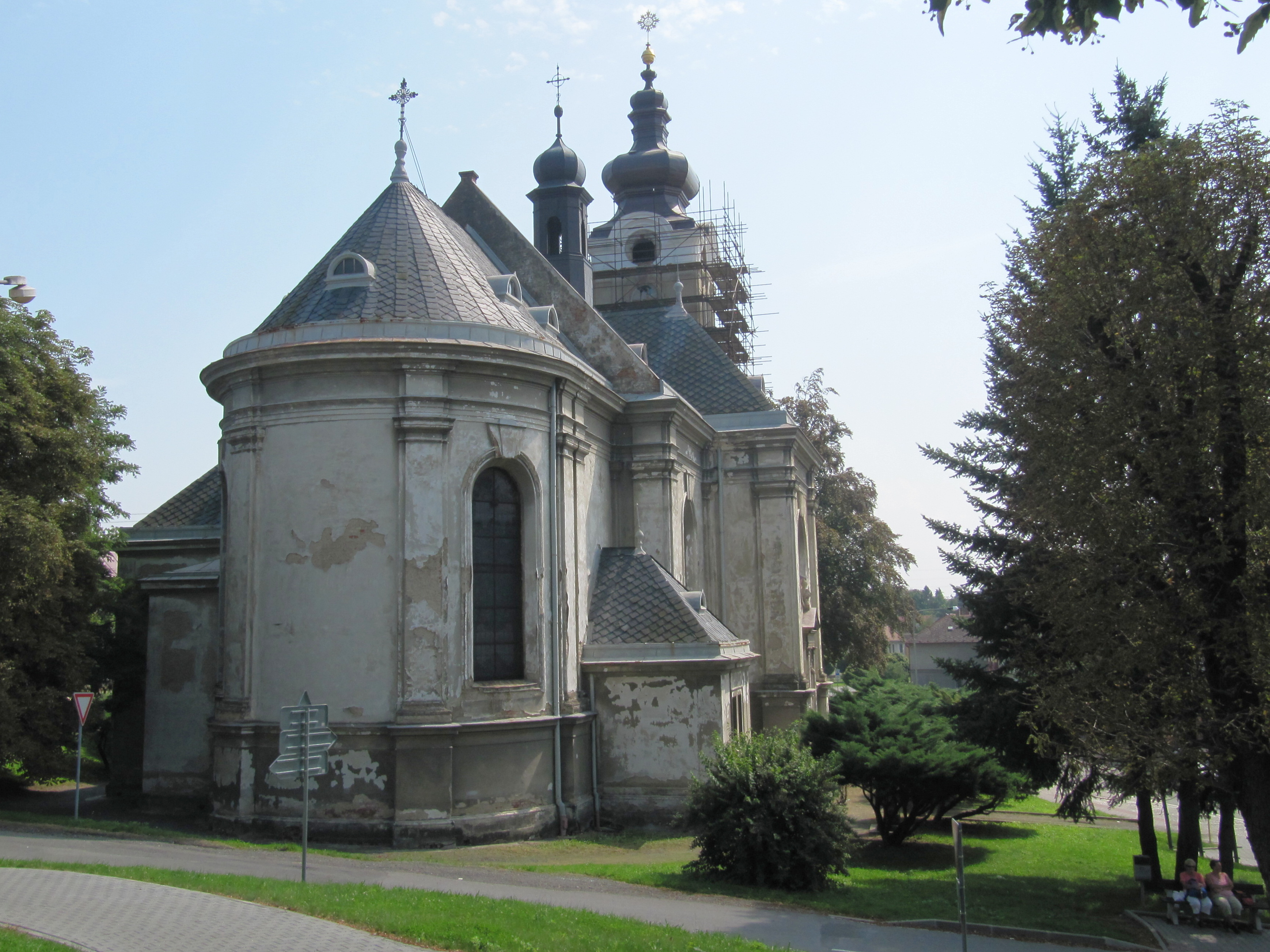
Church of the Nativity of the Virgin Mary

The main landmark of Tršice is the Church of the Nativity of the Virgin Mary. It was built in the historicist and neo-Baroque styles in 1905–1906. It replaced the old Gothic church, which was demolished in 1905.

The most valuable building is the Renaissance castle from the 16th century. The castle now serves as the municipal office.

There is the Chapel of Saint Praxedes in Vacanovice. It is a Baroque building that dates from the end of the 18th century.
