= Smartwings =

Largest airline of the Czech Republic

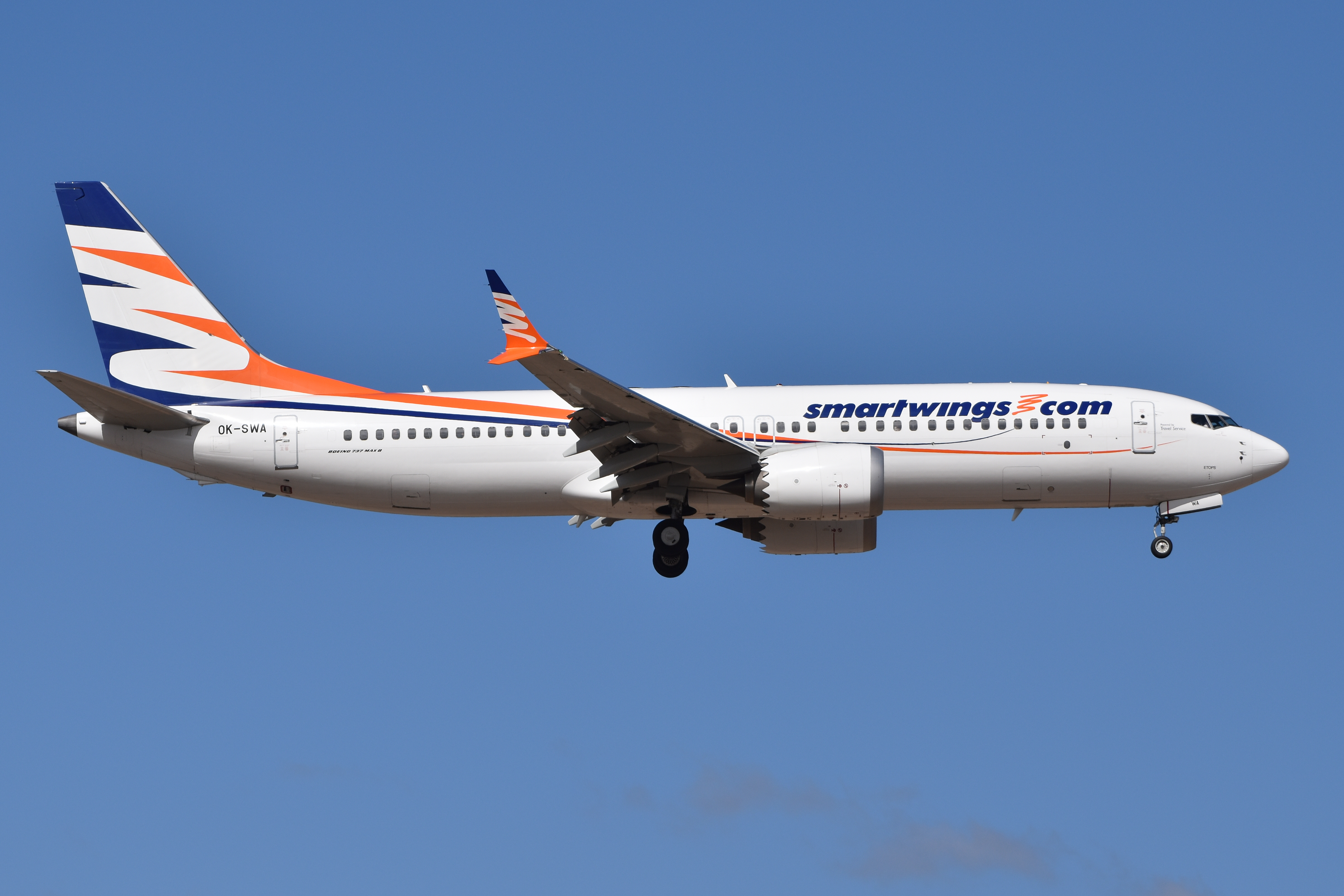
- Boeing 737 MAX 8
IATA	ICAO	Call sign
QS	TVS	SKYTRAVEL
- Founded: 1997; 29 years ago
- Operating bases: Václav Havel Airport Prague
- Subsidiaries: Smartwings Hungary; Smartwings Poland; Smartwings Slovakia
- Fleet size: 41
- Destinations: 44
- Parent company: Czech Airlines
- Headquarters: Prague, Czech Republic
- Key people: Emre Pekesen; Nur Karabacak
- Employees: 2,438
- Website: www.smartwings.com

Smartwings, a.s. (formerly Travel Service, a.s.) is a Czech airline with its head office on the property of Václav Havel Airport Prague. It is the biggest airline in the Czech Republic, and it operates scheduled and chartered flights, mainly to leisure destinations. The airline also provides aircraft on wet and dry leases to other airlines, and operates charter flights through several subsidiaries: Smartwings Poland, Smartwings Hungary and Smartwings Slovakia.

Although Smartwings previously acquired Czech Airlines in 2017, following the latter's bankruptcy and a major corporate restructuring in October 2024, Czech Airlines was transformed into a holding company, and Smartwings became its wholly owned operating subsidiary. In December 2025, it was announced that Pegasus Airlines had reached an agreement to acquire the holding company.

Pegasus Airlines completed the acquisition of Czech Airlines (ČSA) and the Smartwings Group on 1 October 2026.

== History ==
=== Foundation and early years ===
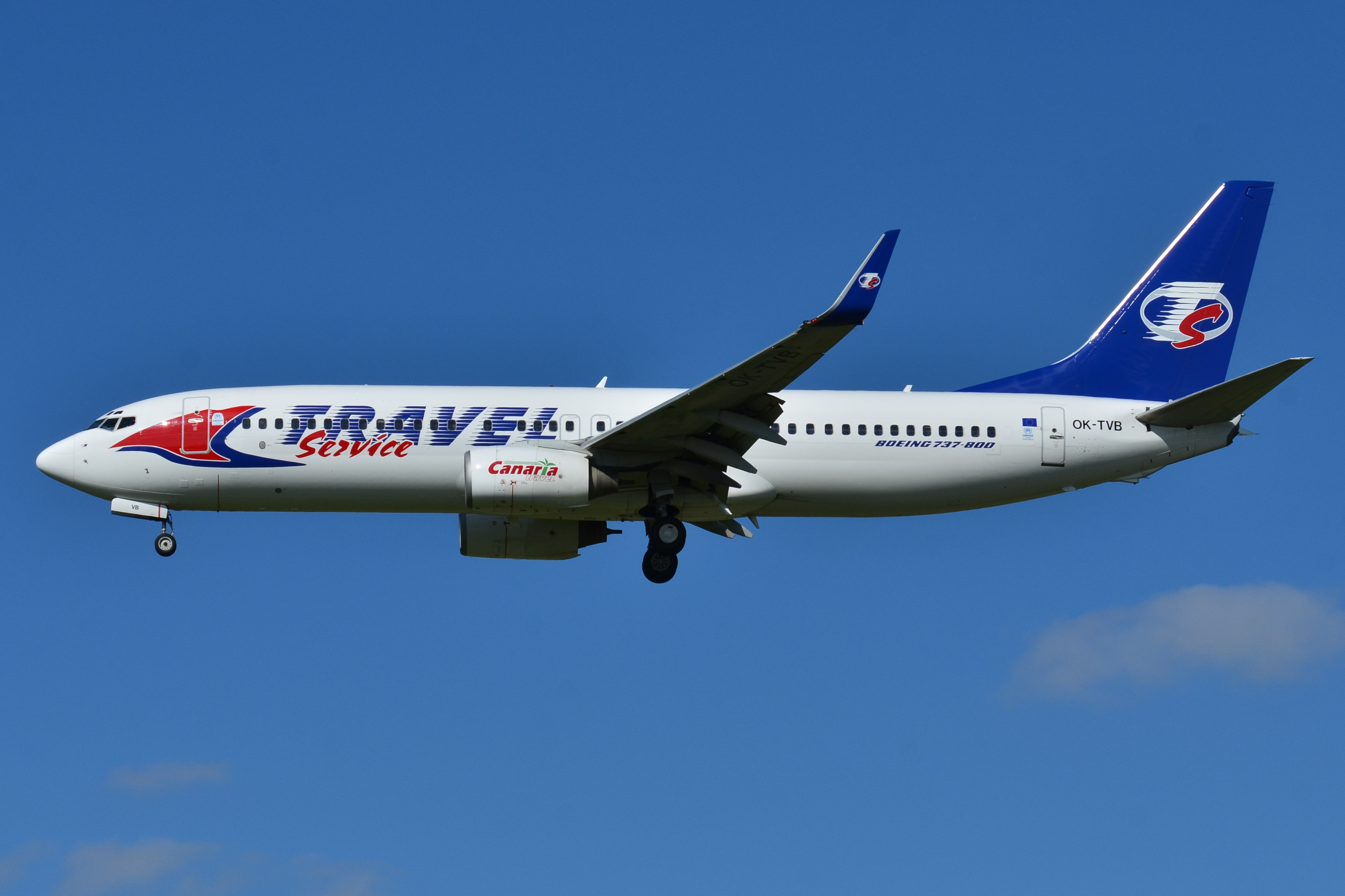
A Travel Service Boeing 737-800 in 2013

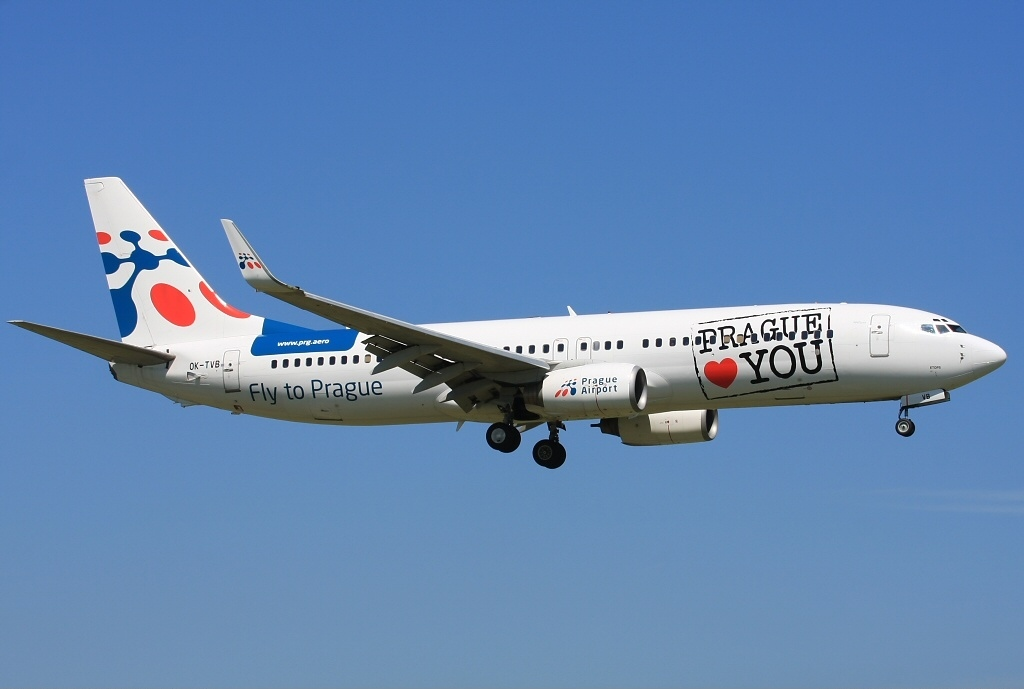
A Travel Service Boeing 737-800 promoting Prague as destination

Smartwings was founded in September 1997 under the name Travel Service Airlines a.s. and focused on charter flights mainly for Czech tour operators. The first airliner was a Tupolev Tu-154M but in 2000, the air carrier received its first Boeing 737-400 with which own operations were started.

In 2004, Travel Service launched the brand Smart Wings for low-cost flights. Travel Service leased two Boeing 737-500s from Lufthansa which were primary intended for Smartwings flights. Both aircraft were painted in the new Smartwings livery. Former Czech president Václav Klaus attended the opening ceremony, which was held on 1 May 2004. In 2007, the company carried 2.2 million passengers, and a year later about 2.3 million passengers. In 2014, it carried 4.3 million passengers, about 1.2 of them on regular flights under the brand name Smartwings.

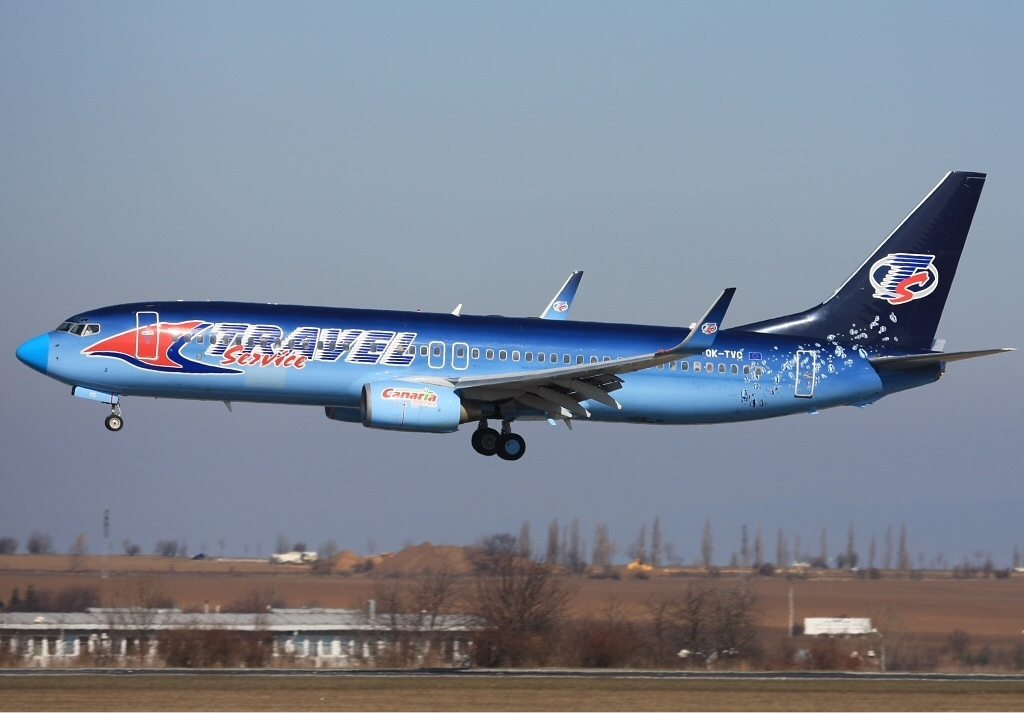
A Travel Service Boeing 737-800 in repainted O2 livery, with Travel Service titles attached

On 18 September 2007, the Icelandair Group acquired 50% stake in the carrier, and purchased further shares to bring its holding up to 80% by April 2008. In December 2008, it reduced its holding to 66% by selling shares to the other shareholders, Unimex. In 2009, their stake was further diluted to 50.1% through a new share issue; they also sold a portion of their stake to fellow owners, reducing their holding to 30%. In 2009, Icelandair spun its 30% stake in Travel Service into a new company, which was taken over by Icelandair's creditors. Chinese investment group CEFC China Energy then held a 49.9% stake in Travel Service.

In 2013, Travel Service cancelled its order for a Boeing 787 Dreamliner and purchased a Boeing 737 MAX 8 instead.

=== Development since 2017 ===
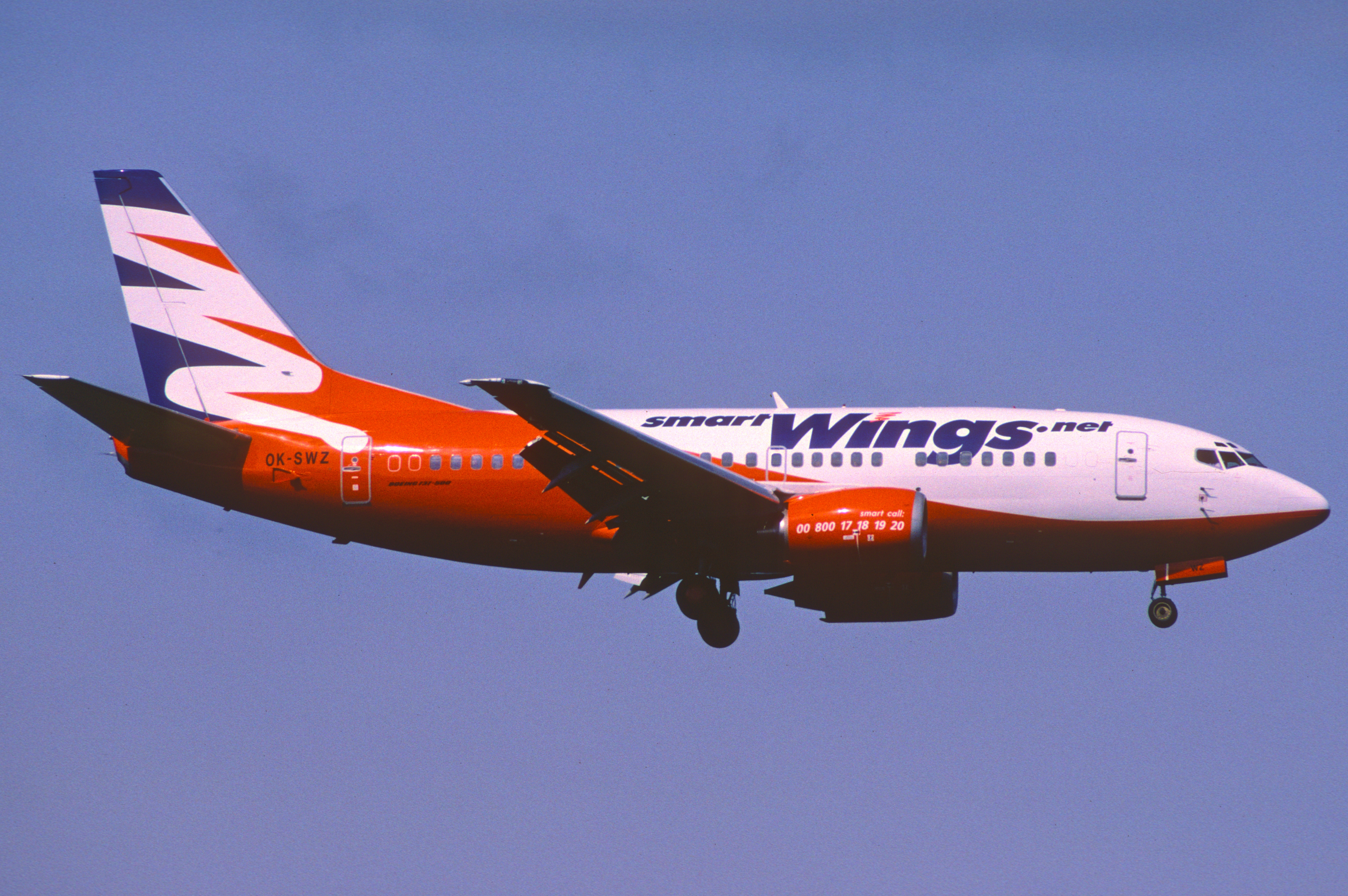
A Boeing 737-500 in special Smartwings 2004 colors

Travel Service owned 98 percent of Czech Airlines; it bought 64% from Prisko and Korean Air in 2017. Before, it owned 34%, bought in 2014. After Czech Airlines went through business restructuring, Smartwings retained 30% of the company.

In October 2017, it was announced that Travel Service planned to transfer its branding from an airline to a holding company, and would move all of its operations under the Smartwings brand. In 2018, it was announced that the Travel Service livery would be replaced by the Smartwings livery. Also in that year, deliveries of the new Boeing 737 MAX began.

Travel Service was renamed Smartwings, the name of its former low-cost subsidiary, on 10 December 2018.

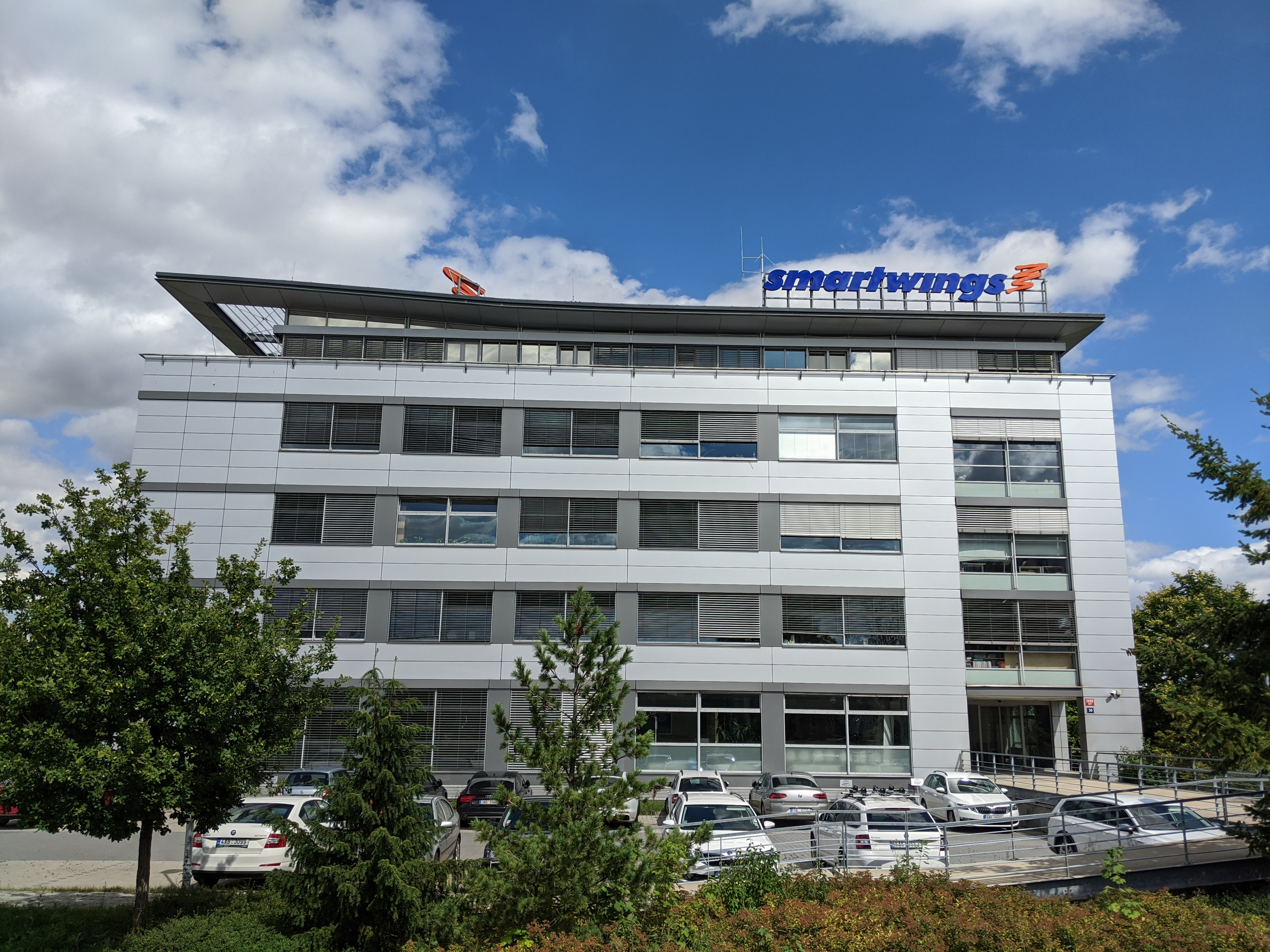
Headquarters in Prague

In March 2019, Smartwings announced plans to create a German subsidiary by late 2019, and to transition its Czech Airlines subsidiary to an all-Boeing 737 fleet. However, these plans have not materialized, and Czech Airlines maintains its Airbus fleet. In February 2021, Smartwings announced the return of their stored Boeing 737 MAX to service by the end of the month, the first European airline to resume operations following the flying ban lasting over 20 months due to the COVID-19 pandemic.

In February 2024, then owner CITIC – which bought its shares from CEFC – sold all of its shares in Smartwings to Czech-owned Prague City Air, which also owns the majority in Czech Airlines. In October 2024, Smartwings took over all flight operations of Czech Airlines, continuing to operate them under the Czech Airlines brand, while Czech Airlines was restructured as a holding company.

In December 2025, it was announced the Turkish low-cost airline, Pegasus Airlines has signed an agreement to acquire both Czech Airlines and Smartwings in a deal worth €154 million (3,8 billion CZK).

Pegasus Airlines completed the acquisition of Czech Airlines (ČSA) and the Smartwings Group on 1 October 2026.

== Destinations ==
Smartwings serve over 40 destinations in over 25 countries from their hub at Václav Havel Airport Prague. The airline primarily focuses on leisure destinations across Europe, North Africa, and the Middle East.

Country	City	Airport
Albania	Tirana	Tirana International Airport Nënë Tereza
Bahrain	Manama	Bahrain International Airport
Belgium	Brussels	Brussels Airport
Bulgaria	Burgas	Burgas Airport
Bulgaria	Varna	Varna Airport
Cape Verde	Boa Vista	Boa Vista International Airport
Cape Verde	Sal	Amílcar Cabral International Airport
Croatia	Split	Split Airport
Croatia	Dubrovnik	Dubrovnik Airport
Cyprus	Larnaca	Larnaca International Airport
Czech Republic	Brno	Brno-Tuřany Airport
Czech Republic	Ostrava	Leoš Janáček Airport Ostrava
Czech Republic	Pardubice	Pardubice Airport
Czech Republic	Prague	Václav Havel Airport Prague
Czech Republic	Karlovy Vary	Karlovy Vary Airport
Czech Republic	České Budějovice	České Budějovice Airport
Egypt	El Alamein	El Alamein International Airport
Egypt	Hurghada	Hurghada International Airport
Egypt	Marsa Alam	Marsa Alam International Airport
Egypt	Mersa Matruh	Marsa Matruh International Airport
Egypt	Sharm El–Sheikh	Sharm El–Sheikh International Airport
Estonia	Tallinn	Tallinn Airport
France	Nice	Nice Côte d'Azur Airport
France	Paris	Charles de Gaulle Airport
France	Toulouse	Toulouse-Blagnac Airport
Germany	Cologne	Cologne Bonn Airport
Germany	Düsseldorf	Düsseldorf Airport
Greece	Athens	Athens International Airport
Greece	Araxos	Patras Araxos Airport
Greece	Corfu	Corfu International Airport
Greece	Chania	Chania International Airport
Greece	Heraklion	Heraklion International Airport
Greece	Kalamata	Kalamata International Airport
Greece	Karpathos	Karpathos Island National Airport
Greece	Kavala	Kavala International Airport
Greece	Kefalonia	Kefalonia International Airport
Greece	Kos	Kos International Airport
Greece	Kythira	Kythira Island National Airport
Greece	Lemnos	Lemnos International Airport
Greece	Mytilene	Mytilene International Airport
Greece	Patras	Patras Araxos Airport
Greece	Preveza	Aktion National Airport
Greece	Rhodes	Rhodes International Airport
Greece	Samos	Samos International Airport
Greece	Santorini	Santorini International Airport
Greece	Skiathos	Skiathos International Airport
Greece	Thessaloniki	Thessaloniki Airport
Greece	Zakynthos	Zakynthos International Airport
Hungary	Budapest	Budapest Ferenc Liszt International Airport
Hungary	Debrecen	Debrecen International Airport
Israel	Tel Aviv	Ben Gurion Airport
Italy	Brindisi	Brindisi Airport
Italy	Cagliari	Cagliari Elmas Airport
Italy	Catania	Catania–Fontanarossa Airport
Italy	Comiso	Comiso Airport
Italy	Lamezia Terme	Lamezia Terme International Airport
Italy	Naples	Naples International Airport
Italy	Olbia	Olbia Costa Smeralda Airport
Italy	Rome	Rome Fiumicino Airport
Italy	Venice	Venice Marco Polo Airport
Kenya	Mombasa	Moi International Airport
Norway	Bergen	Bergen Airport, Fresland
Oman	Salalah	Salalah International Airport
Oman	Muscat	Muscat International Airport
Poland	Warsaw	Warsaw Chopin Airport
Poland	Gdańsk	Gdańsk Lech Wałęsa Airport
Poland	Rzezsów	Rzezsów-Jasionka Airport
Poland	Katowice	Katowice Airport
Poland	Poznań	Poznań-Ławica Airport
Poland	Wroclaw	Wroclaw Airport
Portugal	Funchal	Madeira Airport
Portugal	Lisbon	Lisbon Airport
Portugal	Ponta Delgada	João Paulo II Airport
Portugal	Porto	Porto Airport
Qatar	Qatar	Hamad International Airport
Romania	Bucharest	Bucharest Henri Coandă International Airport
Senegal	Dakar	Blaise Diagne International Airport
Slovakia	Bratislava	Bratislava Airport
Slovakia	Košice	Košice International Airport
Slovakia	Poprad	Poprad-Tatry Airport
Spain	Almería	Almería Airport
Spain	Alicante	Alicante-Elche Miguel Hernández Airport
Spain	Barcelona	Josep Tarradellas Barcelona–El Prat Airport
Spain	Bilbao	Bilbao Airport
Spain	Fuerteventura	Fuerteventura Airport
Spain	Ibiza	Ibiza Airport
Spain	Lanzarote	Lanzarote Airport
Spain	Las Palmas	Gran Canaria Airport
Spain	Madrid	Madrid–Barajas Airport
Spain	Málaga	Málaga Airport
Spain	Menorca	Menorca Airport
Spain	Murcia	Región de Murcia International Airport
Spain	Palma de Mallorca	Palma de Mallorca Airport
Spain	Santa Cruz de La Palma	La Palma Airport
Spain	Tenerife	Tenerife South Airport
Spain	Valencia	Valencia Airport
Sweden	Stockholm	Stockholm Arlanda Airport
Switzerland	Geneva	Geneva Airport
Tunisia	Djerba	Djerba–Zarzis International Airport
Tunisia	Enfidha	Enfidha–Hammamet International Airport
Tunisia	Monastir	Monastir Habib Bourguiba International Airport
Turkey	Antalya	Antalya Airport
Turkey	Dalaman	Dalaman Airport
Turkey	İzmir	İzmir Adnan Menderes Airport
Turkey	Milas	Milas–Bodrum Airport
Tanzania	Zanzibar	Abeid Amani Karume International Airport
United Arab Emirates	Dubai	Al Maktoum International Airport
United Arab Emirates	Dubai	Dubai International Airport
United Arab Emirates	Ras Al Khaimah	Ras Al Khaimah International Airport
United Kingdom	Birmingham	Birmingham Airport

=== Codeshare agreements ===
Smartwings has codeshare agreements with the following airlines:

- Air Europa
- Eurowings
- Israir
- Starlux Airlines

== Fleet ==
=== Current fleet ===
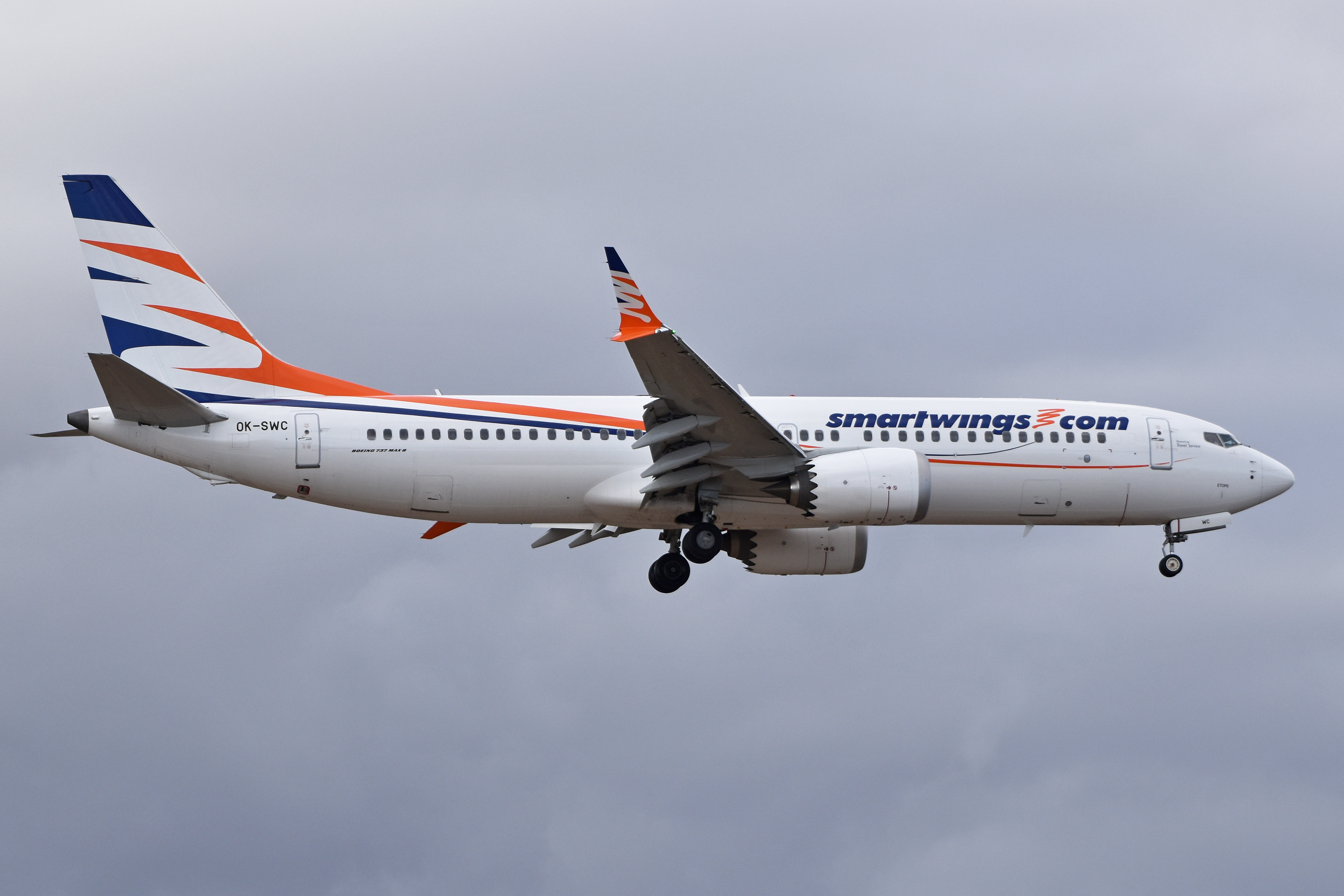
Boeing 737 MAX 8

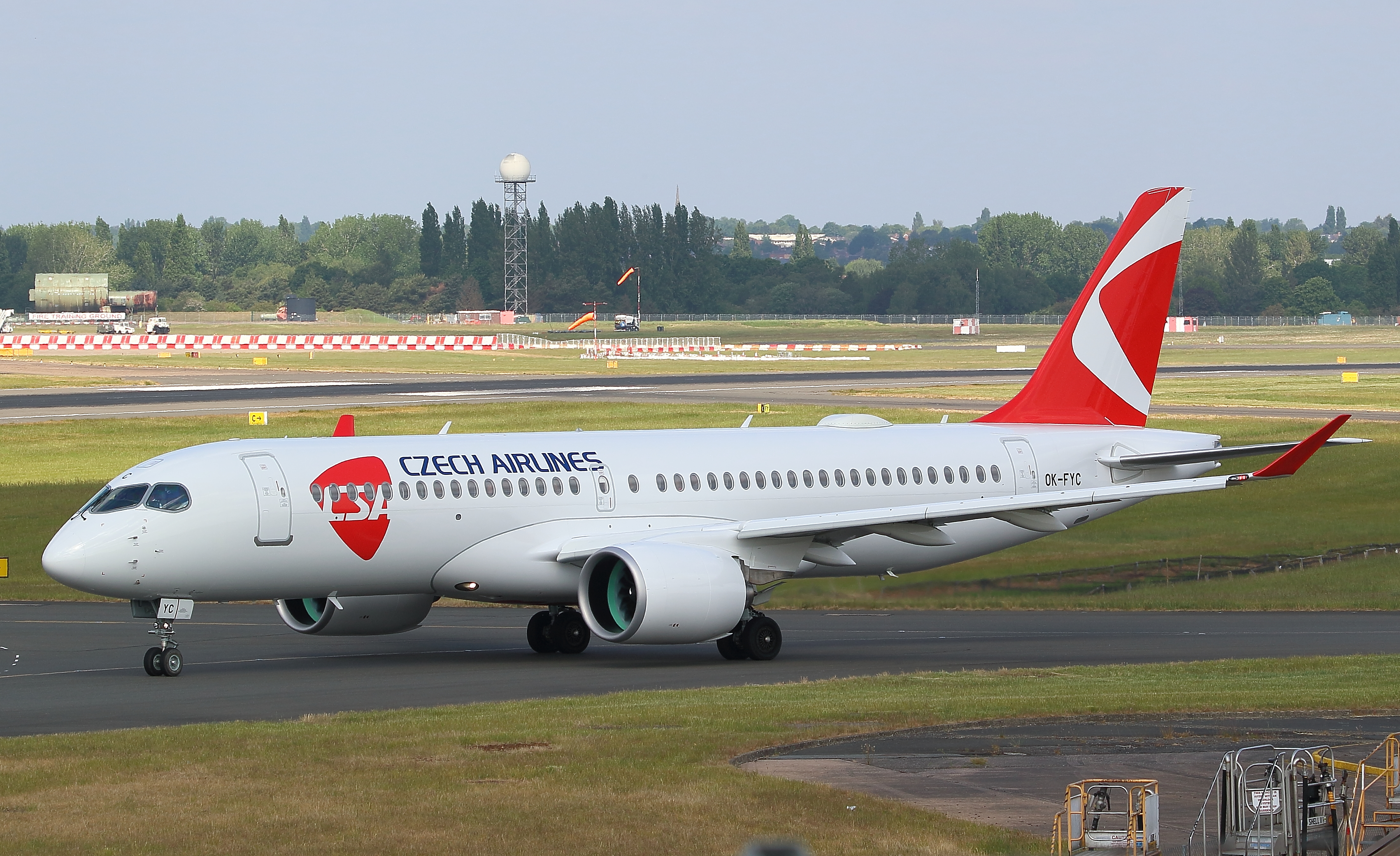
Airbus A220 operated under Czech Airlines branding

As of July 2026, Smartwings operates the following aircraft:

Smartwings fleet
Aircraft	In service	Orders	Passengers			Notes
Aircraft	In service	Orders	J	Y	Total	Notes
Airbus A220-300	4	—	—	149	149	Operated under Czech Airlines branding.
Airbus A320-200	2	—	—	180	180	Operated under Czech Airlines branding.
Boeing 737-800	19	—	—	189	189	
Boeing 737-900ER	2	—	—	212	212	
Boeing 737 MAX 8	14	—	18	150	168	
Boeing 737 MAX 8	14	—	—	189	189	
Total	41					

=== Historic fleet ===
Smartwings and formerly Travel Service also operated the following aircraft types:

- Boeing 737-400
- Boeing 737-500
- Boeing 757-200
- Boeing 767-300ER
- Tupolev Tu-154M
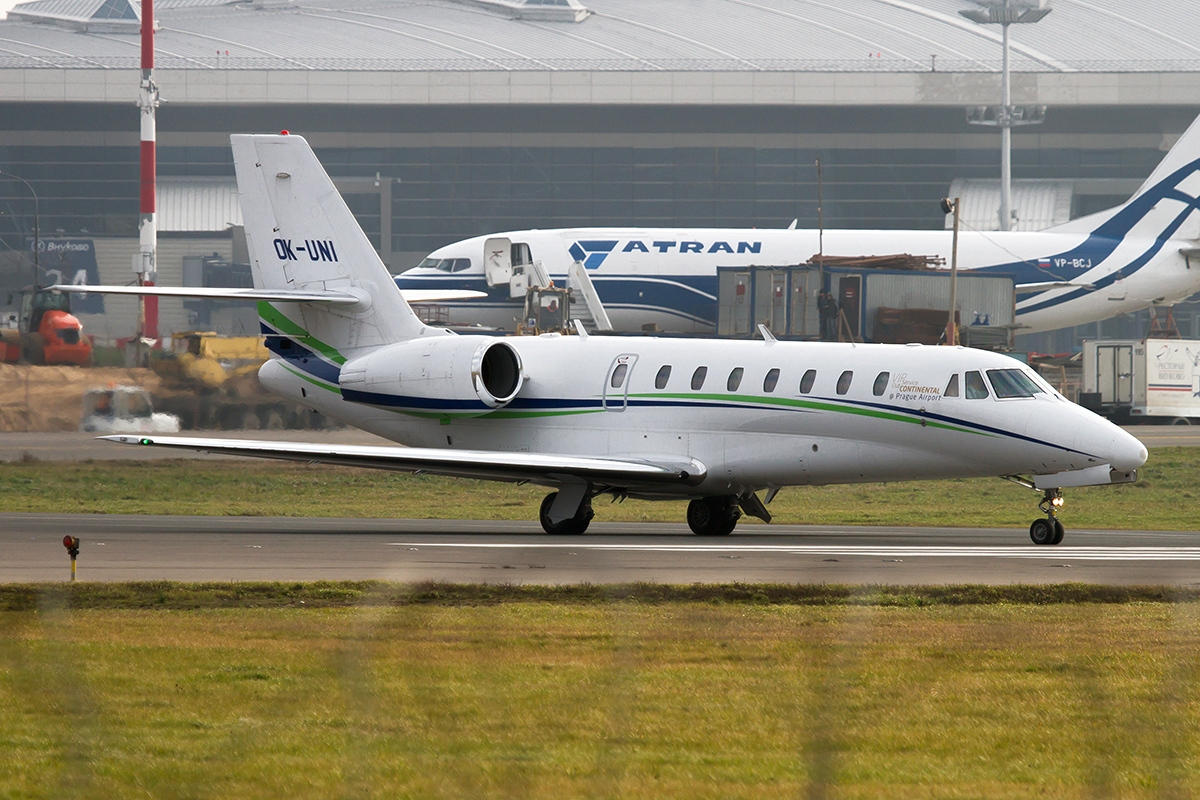
  Cessna Citation Sovereign

=== Business jet fleet ===
Smartwings operates private charter flights using a fleet of 5 Cessna Citation business jets. The fleet consists of Citation Longitude and Citation Sovereign aircraft.

== Incidents ==
- On 22 August 2019, a Smartwings Boeing 737-800 (Registration: OK-TVO) operated flight QS-1125 departed from Samos, Greece to Prague, Czech Republic with 170 passengers on board. The aircraft was flying at 36,000 feet (11,000 m) over the Aegean Sea about 100 nautical miles (120 mi; 190 km) northeast of Athens, Greece when it had an engine failure. The crew drifted the aircraft down to 24,000 feet (7,300 m) without informing ATC of the emergency, only informing them of a "technical malfunction". Instead of landing at the nearest suitable airport, as per engine failure procedure, the flight crew carried on to Prague at that level for a landing without further incident about 2 hours 20 minutes later. The Czech Civil Aviation Authority (CAA) confirmed that an investigation had been launched into the incident: "we have decided to launch an investigation as the procedure followed doesn't seem standard." Following the incident, Prague police launched an investigation into the flight on suspicion of endangering the public due to negligence, and a Smartwings internal investigation demoted the captain from his post as head of flight operations. In July 2020, the CAA released the final report by the Air Accidents Investigation Institute (AAII), which blamed the incident on the captain failing to follow mandatory procedures, including landing at the nearest possible diversion airport after an engine failure. As of July 2020, the captain who piloted the plane during the incident continued to pilot Smartwings flights.
