= České Budějovice Airport =

České Budějovice Airport Letiště České Budějovice

- IATA: JCL; ICAO: LKCS

Summary
- Airport type: Public
- Serves: České Budějovice
- Opened: 27 June 1937
- Elevation AMSL: 432 m (1,417 ft)
- Coordinates: 48°56′47″N 014°25′41″E
- Website: airport-cb.cz
- Interactive map of České Budějovice Airport

Runways
Direction	Length		Surface
Direction	ft	m	Surface
09/27	8,398	2,560	Concrete

České Budějovice Airport (Czech: Letiště České Budějovice) (ICAO: LKCS, IATA: JCL) is a domestic and international airport in the Czech Republic, operated by South Bohemian Airport České Budějovice a.s., owned by the South Bohemian Region. It is 6 km from the centre of České Budějovice, in the direction of Český Krumlov. Modernization to the public international airport was completed in August 2023, when it launched its first international connection.

The company South Bohemian Airport České Budějovice holds the license for non-public international traffic. It is authorized to receive and dispatch medium-sized aircraft up to a wingspan of 36 meters. Due to lack of equipment, the airport cannot accept flights in bad weather; aircraft can land only in daylight and in good visibility (VFR). In addition, flights requiring customs clearance and the presence of customs and immigration services must register 24 hours in advance. At present, the airport is most used for sports and limited commercial flights; regular airport clients are firms with business interests in southern Bohemia.

== History ==
In 1932, the construction of the airport for the needs of the Aeroclub České Budějovice and the Czechoslovak Air Force began; ceremonial commissioning was on 27 June 1937. During the Nazi occupation, the airport was a backup and training base of the German Luftwaffe. After the liberation, the Czechoslovak Army took over the airport. Between 1950 and 1952, the airport was completely modernized, after which the Aeroklub České Budějovice was no longer permitted to operate at the airport and moved to Hosín airport.

Between 1952 and 31 December 1994, the 1st Air Force Regiment "Zvolenský" was based at the local airport. The presence of the Czechoslovak Air Force was gradually reduced during the 1990s, culminating in the closure of the military base in 2005.

== Modernisation ==
Thorough modernization and reconstruction of the airport started in 2009, to bring it to a similar standard to other regional airports in the Czech Republic. The investor in this project is the owner of the complex, the South Bohemian Region.

The first phase was completed in June 2016, including the repair of the runway and taxiways, the reinforcement of the runway surface and the addition of new navigatation aids for conventional airplanes. In addition, an in-house communications, engineering networks and a security center were built.

Phase II comprises the construction of a new terminal, expanding aircraft stands, improving access roads and car parks for passengers, and providing public lighting. Once the terminal building is completed, there will be a certification process, lasting six to twelve months, allowing international traffic. The airport will be a fully certified airport for charter, tourist, business, freight and domestic transportation, with aircraft such as the Boeing 737 and Airbus A320 permitted to land.

Construction of the new terminal started in December 2017, full operation was planned for the end of 2020.

České Budějovice finally received its first commercial service on the second of August 2023, being a charter flight to the Turkish city of Antalya, operated by Smartwings for Cedok tour operator. In the days afterwards, flights to Greek islands Heraklion and Rhodes were inaugurated, too. As operations succeeded, summer season 2024 will see an expanded offer including two new charter destinations, tunesian city Enfidha and Burgas in Bulgaria.

== Airlines and destinations ==
The following airlines operate scheduled or charter flights at České Budějovice Airport:

Airlines	Destinations
AlMasria Universal Airlines	Seasonal charter: Hurghada
BH Air	Seasonal charter: Burgas
Corendon Airlines	Seasonal charter: Antalya, Heraklion
Smartwings	Seasonal charter: Antalya, Monastir, Palma de Mallorca, Rhodes
Sundair	Seasonal charter: Burgas
