= Pardubice Airport =

Airport in Pardubice, Czech Republic

Pardubice Airport Letiště Pardubice

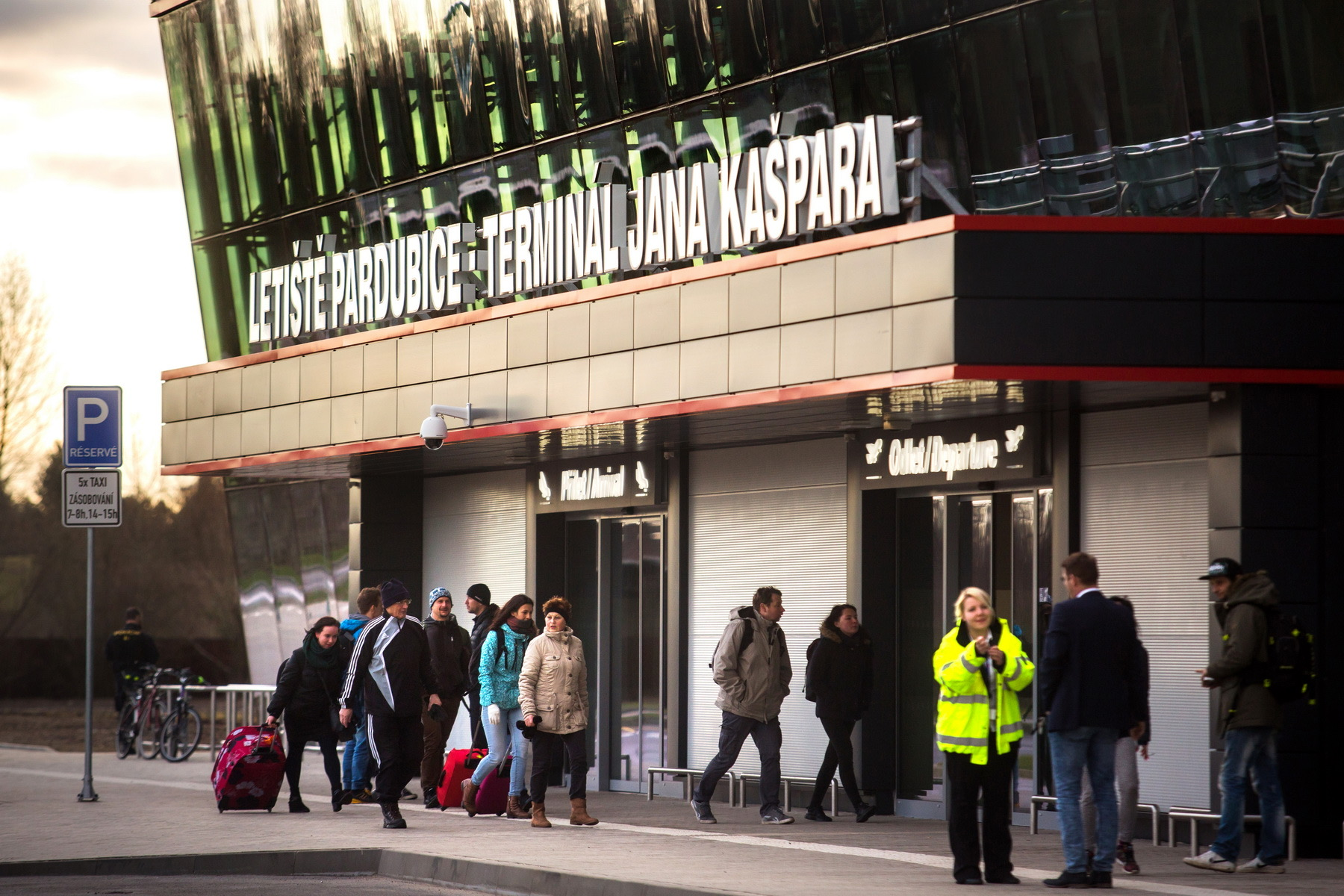
- IATA: PED; ICAO: LKPD

Summary
- Airport type: Public/Military
- Operator: EAST BOHEMIAN AIRPORT a.s.
- Serves: Pardubice
- Location: Pardubice, Popkovice
- Opened: 1930; 96 years ago
- Time zone: CET (UTC+01:00)
  - Summer (DST): CEST (UTC+02:00)
- Elevation AMSL: 741 ft (226 m)
- Coordinates: 50°00′48″N 15°44′19″E
- Website: www.airport-pardubice.cz/en/home/

Map
- Location within Czech Republic

Runways
Direction	Length		Surface
Direction	ft	m	Surface
09/27	8,202	2,500	Concrete

Statistics (2024)
- Passengers: 200,205
- Passenger change 23–24: ▲63%

Pardubice Airport (Czech: Letiště Pardubice) (IATA: PED, ICAO: LKPD) is a combined military and civilian international airport in the city of Pardubice, Czech Republic. Apart from the military purpose, it is used for scheduled services, charter flights to Southern Europe during the summer season and cargo flights.

After the construction of a new terminal building, apron and ground handling facilities in 2017, Pardubice Airport opened up to serve more passengers and handle standard commercial aircraft such as Boeing 737 or Airbus A320 providing better and faster services. The new terminal building bears the name of Czech aviation pioneer Jan Kašpar. The airport's 2017 refurbishment and construction costed 256 million CZK and was fully funded by the Pardubice City Council and Pardubice Region through their shared subsidiary company East Bohemian Airport, a.s. that runs the airport.

== History ==
=== Early years ===
In 1910 Jan Kašpar, an engineer and aviation enthusiast, and his cousin Eugen Čihák, bought a Bleriot XI aeroplane and started with flight experiments on the local military exercise ground in Pardubice. On 16 April 1910 Kašpar flew for the first time as the first person in Czech lands. In later years he arranged flight exhibitions over the country, most famously his flight from Pardubice to Prague (120 km) on 13 May 1911.

The first flying club in the Czech lands was founded in Pardubice on 26 April 1911. The club, named Pardubice Aviation society (Aviatické družstvo Pardubice), had five hangars but during World War I its activities stopped. After the war the place held occasional flight exhibitions. Since the end of 1929 the airport was used as a training place for aviation enthusiasts; expanded to 25 hectares, it was one of the largest in the country. Since 1933 the airport was also used for glider training. In 1936 and 1937, modern airport facilities were built. In 1939 the airfield took receipt of 39 airplanes from the Soviet Union, including 21 twin-engined bombers.

During World War II the airport served for training of Luftwaffe pilots, toward the end of the war for combat operations, and was destroyed by bombing.

=== Development since World War II ===
Between 1950 and 1995, the airport was used only for military purposes. A 2,500 m-long (8,200 ft) concrete runway was built and a pilot training centre established. The airport hosted the 4th and 18th Fighter Air Wings (4. stíhaci a 18. stíhací letecký pluk) equipped with S-199, MiG-15, C-2, C-5, C-11, MiG-19S, MiG-19PM, MiG-21F and Mi-1 helicopters, the 47th Reconnaissance Wing (47. průzkumný letecký pluk) with MiG-21R, Il-28L, Il-14 and later with Su-22 and since 1986 the 30th Strafer Wing (30. bitevní letecký pluk) with Su-25K. Large support military units were located next to the airport and in the city.

During the 1990s the military role of the airport gradually declined. Since 1994 the airport was used as a training base (34. základna školního letectva) but in 2003 the army reduced the role of the airport to provide maintenance and logistics.

In 1993 the company East Bohemian Airport a.s. aiming to open the airport for civilian use was formed. Officially, the airport was opened for civil operation on 18 May 1995. Since 1 November 1996 the airport has been authorised for operation under the Instrument flight rules.

== Airlines and destinations ==
The following airlines operate regular scheduled flights to and from Pardubice:

Airlines	Destinations
Bulgaria Air	Seasonal charter: Burgas
Ryanair	Alicante, Málaga; Seasonal: Girona, Palma de Mallorca
Smartwings	Seasonal charter: Antalya, Bodrum, Burgas, Corfu, Heraklion, Hurghada, Kos, Lamezia Terme, Marsa Alam, Monastir, Palma de Mallorca, Rhodes
Sky Express	Seasonal charter: Heraklion

== Statistics ==
Year	Passengers handled	Passenger % Change	Cargo (tonnes)	Cargo % Change	Aircraft movements	% Change
2018	147,572		183		1,871	
2019	102,206	▼ -30.74	187	▲2.18	1,649	▼ -11.86
2020	33,901	▼ -66.83	871	▲365.77	1,174	▼ -28.80
2021	80,796	▲138.32	203	▼ -76.69	1,539	▲31.09
2022	82,891	▲2.59	169	▼ -16.74	1,563	▲1.55
2023	123,119	▲48.53	19	▼ -94.67	1,448	▼ -7.36
2024	200,205	▲62.61				

== Accidents and incidents ==
- On 1 September 2017, a Eurofighter Typhoon of the Royal Air Force overran the runway on landing at Pardubice.
- On August 1, 2018 a Travel Service Boeing 737 overshot the runway upon landing from Heraklion on a wet runway.

== See also ==
- List of airports in the Czech Republic
