= Sofia Airport =

International airport in Bulgaria

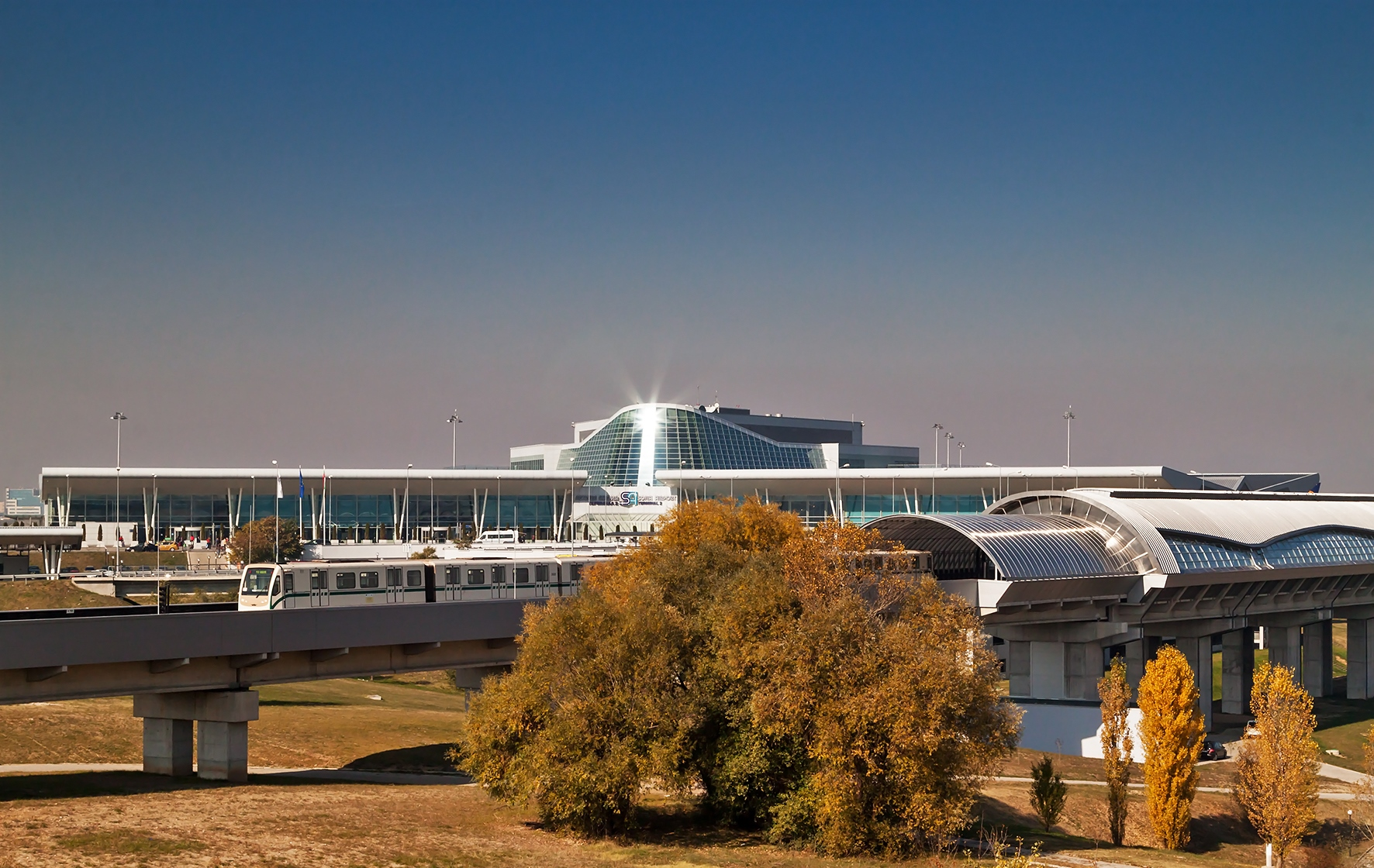
- IATA: SOF; ICAO: LBSF

Summary
- Airport type: Public / Military
- Owner: State-owned
- Operator: SOF Connect AD
- Serves: Sofia
- Location: Sofia, Bulgaria
- Opened: 16 September 1937; 89 years ago
- Hub for: Bulgaria Air
- Operating base for: BH Air; European Air Charter; Ryanair; Wizz Air
- Time zone: EET (UTC+2)
  - Summer (DST): EEST (UTC+3)
- Elevation AMSL: 531 m (1,742 ft)
- Coordinates: 42°41′42″N 023°24′30″E
- Website: www.sofia-airport.eu

Map
- Location in Bulgaria

Runways
Direction	Length		Surface
Direction	m	ft	Surface
09/27	3,600	11,811	Asphalt

Statistics (2025)
- Passengers: 8,413,762
- Passenger change 23-24: ▲9.9%
- Aircraft movements: 65,764
- Movements change 23-24: ▲8.6%
- Cargo (t): 21,887
- Cargo change 23-24: ▲11.2%
- Source: Bulgarian AIP at EUROCONTROL

Sofia Airport (IATA: SOF, ICAO: LBSF) is the main international airport of Bulgaria, located 10 km (6.2 mi) east of the centre of the capital Sofia. In 2025 the airport surpassed 8 million passengers for the first time. The airport serves as the home base for BH Air, Bulgaria Air, European Air Charter and GullivAir, and as a base for both Ryanair and Wizz Air. The airport also houses the Bulgarian Air Force's Vrazhdebna Air Base.

== History ==
=== Early years ===
On 16 September 1937, Tsar Boris III signed a decree which declared land within the Village of Vrazhdebna be allocated for the construction of an airport. Construction then began on the site, which was 11 km (6.8 mi) from the city centre. Two years later in 1939, Sofia Airport opened its first passenger waiting room, and after another two years was followed by a fully constructed airfield with a fully paved runway.

From June through September 1938, Yugoslav airline Aeroput connected Sofia with Belgrade thrice weekly using Lockheed Model 10 Electra planes.

During the Second World War, the facilities were used by the military. Mail, perishable freight and passenger operations began in 1947 from buildings on the north side of the airport. The passenger terminal (now Terminal 1) on the south side was completed during the Second World War in the manner of a then-modern European railway terminus to designs by the architect Ivan Marangozov. It opened after several years of delay in 1947. The structure comprised a government wing to the west, an international handling area in the middle, and a domestic handling area to the east. At that time, it was planned that the airport would eventually have two intersecting runways at a 30-degree angle to each other.

The terminal had substantially reached its capacity of some 600,000 passengers a year by the later 1960s and was subjected to a number of refurbishments and extensions beginning in the spring of 1968. In 1975, a new international arrivals handling extension was opened to the west of the building, the domestic area to the east was enlarged, the government handling area was removed to a dedicated terminal some distance to the west, a VIP handling area opened in the old terminal, apron area was extended to the east and new taxiways opened. A bonded warehouse opened to the east of the terminal square in 1969 and several new hangars followed to the east of the first maintenance base in the 1970s. A new checked baggage handling system opened to the north of the building in the early 1980s, cosmetic and traffic reorganising refurbishments were carried out in 1990, with a substantial landside extension following in 2000.

By the late 1970s, the terminal was handling in the region of 3 million passengers a year, a million of them on domestic routes. Passenger numbers fell off sharply after the 1979 CMEA ("Comecon") oil price shock and recovered to just over a million a year by the late 1980s. In the early and mid-1990s, domestic traffic practically ceased, while foreign traffic reduced significantly. The latter began growing apace in the late 1990s and early 2000s to reach its current levels. The terminal was last refurbished partially in 1990. In 2000, it underwent a wholesale update in which the international arrivals area was moved to the east wing where domestic handling had been, the former international arrivals area to the west was closed, and the layout of the central international departures area was changed in line with world developments. Despite the work to the old terminal, the airport was becoming overwhelmed with passenger traffic.

Options for different airport developments began to be examined in the mid-1960s. One option was to relocate the facility to a new site, with some locations up to 70 km (43 mi) from Sofia. Another option involved extending the airport's area radically to the north-east and gradually removing the focus of the airport there. A third option was to develop substantially the same site. By the later 1980s, the authorities had settled on the last option.

=== Development since the 1990s ===
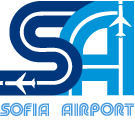
Old Sofia Airport logo used until 2022

Jes Air launched a flight to Ottawa using Airbus A310s in June 1991. The following December, Balkan Bulgarian Airlines commenced direct service to New York City aboard Boeing 767s. Project design, involving a new terminal to the east of the old facility, a new runway to the north of (and parallel to) the existing runway, and taxiways, was completed by the mid-1990s. A finance package involving very significant European and Kuwaiti investment was initially agreed in 1998 and was in place by 2000. Work began in 2001. The new runway and some taxiways were completed in mid-2006. Terminal 2 was formally inaugurated on 27 December 2006.

Design and construction of a new control tower was discussed in 2006 but this project appeared to be in abeyance by 2008. Over the years, Sofia Airport has been criticised for its lack of world class air freight facilities and for some access problems. Passengers to and from the Bulgarian interior have to access or egress the airport through crowded rail and coach facilities in central Sofia. A rail link has been discussed on several occasions since the 1960s. The next best thing, perhaps, was the extension of Sofia Metro Line 1 some 5 km from Blvd Tsarigradsko shose. This was opened on 2 April 2015 under the name Sofia Airport Metro Station. The station is adjacent to Terminal 2. Connection with terminal 1 is by free shuttle bus.

The airport is occasionally criticised as a source of environmental noise and pollution and strict noise abatement procedures have been enforced for departing traffic since the mid-1970s, while arriving traffic is generally routed to approach the field from the east, clear of Sofia.

A significant and recurring operational criticism of Sofia Airport has concerned its historical lack of all-weather operations capability. Though the new runway was designed for ICAO Category 3 operations, in 2007 it emerged that radio interference from security fencing, and most significantly from a large newly built lorry park, prevented certification (and hence use) of the associated radio navigational aids. During the winter months, the airport, located on a high alluvial plain surrounded by mountains, suffers from very significant and frequent fog precipitation. In such circumstances, flights are redirected to diversion airports in Bulgaria or neighbouring countries, lengthening journeys by many hours.

On 3 June 2016, the Bulgarian government launched a tender for the operation of Sofia Airport. Expected to bring in €600 million to the state over 35 years, the tender has reportedly attracted interest from the operators of airports in Munich, Frankfurt, Zurich, Lyon, Dublin and London-Heathrow and as well as other operators.

As of 22 July 2020, the concessionaire of Sofia Airport is the Sof Connect consortium, consisting of the French investment fund Meridiam (99% stake) and Austria's Strabag (1% stake). The concession period runs for 35 years. The airport's operator for the first 12 years of the concession period will be Munich Airport International. On 20 April 2021, SOF Connect AD officially became the concessionaire of the airport.

As of 17 February 2025 the airport was officially named after the Apostle of Freedom and Bulgarian National hero Vasil Levski with a decree of the President of the Republic of Bulgaria Rumen Radev.

=== Reconstruction ===
As a result of growing air traffic and passenger numbers, the airport facilities struggled to cope despite several expansions in the years prior. Planning began in the 1990s for a new terminal to be constructed at the airport. The new runway was offset from the old by 210 m (690 ft) with the eastern end crossing the Iskar River bed on a specially constructed bridge. New taxiways were also constructed, allowing for 22 aircraft movements per hour. The old runway was then to be used as a taxiway only. The new runway and taxiways were opened in mid-2006, and Terminal 2 formally opened in late 2006.

The total cost of the project was planned at €200 million. Finance was secured in 1997–98 from the European Investment Bank (€60 million), Kuwait Fund for Arab Economic Development (12.3 million Kuwaiti dinars, approximately €41.5 million), and the European Union PHARE Programme (€7.6 million). In August 2000, an ISPA grant of €50 million was allocated and in December the financing memorandum was signed.

The construction works were in two lots: the new terminal with its surrounding infrastructure and the new runway. The first lot was allocated to the German branch of Austrian company Strabag, while the second was won by a consortium of Kuwaiti company Mohamed Abdulmohsin al-Kharafi & Sons and UAE-based Admak General Contracting Company.

The initial completion deadline for the new terminal was 15 December 2004 to a total budget of €112.2 million. Immediately after work started, Strabag contested the geological surveys by Dutch consultants NACO B.V. and demanded additional funding for unexpected additional works. The delay was ten months, and construction resumed after the Bulgarian government agreed to augment the project's value by €4.8 million and extend the deadline to 31 August 2005.

In 2004 Strabag demanded an additional €6 million due to rising steel prices. The Ministry of Transportation rejected the claim, backed by a report from NACO. In May 2005, the contractor threatened to take the case to international arbitration. In August 2005, it became clear that Strabag would not be able to meet the changed deadline, slippage being put at six to eight weeks. In November 2005, Strabag asked for eight months' further extension.

== Infrastructure ==
=== Control tower ===
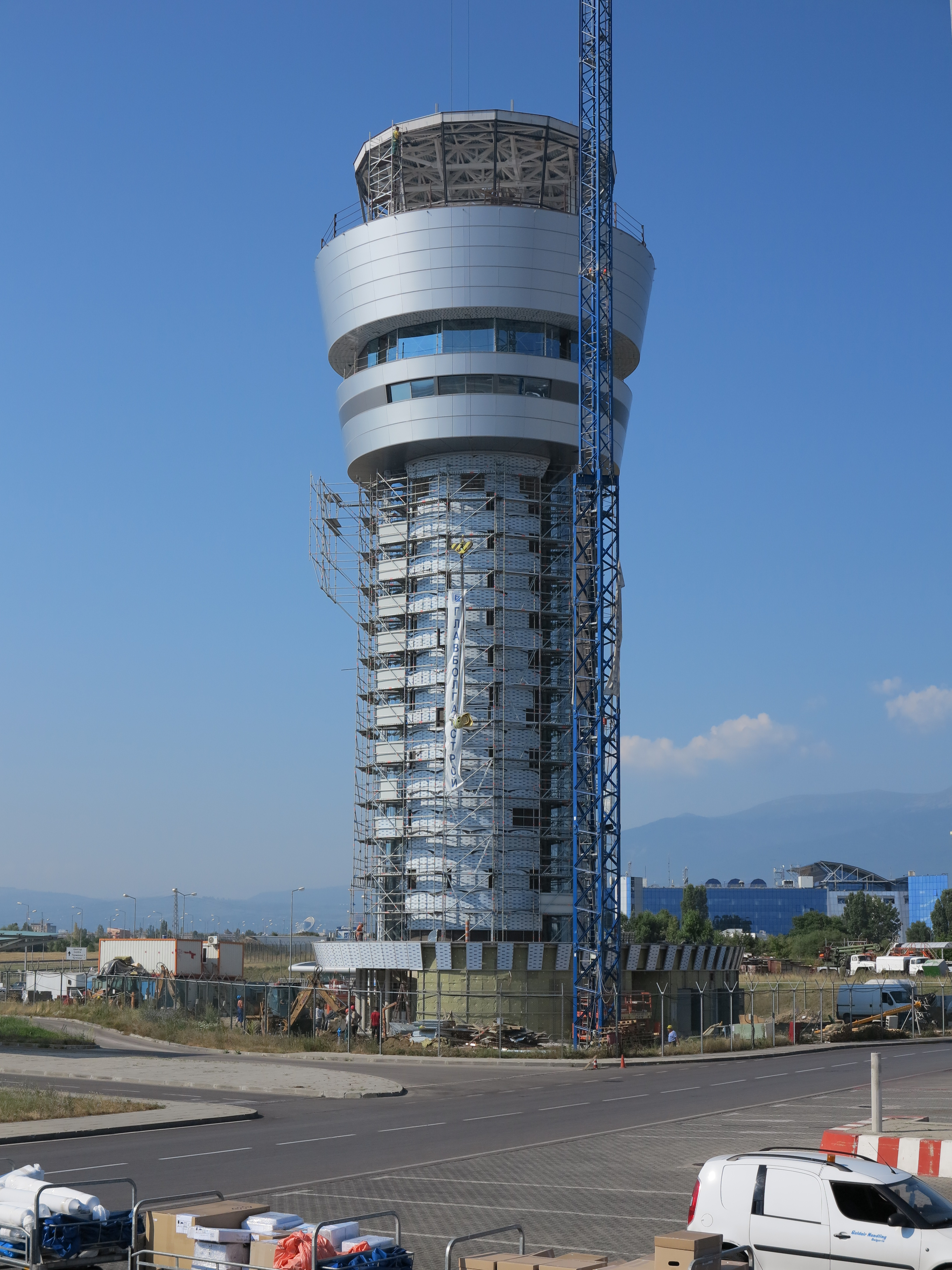
The 2012 air traffic control tower

A new 50 m (160 ft) control tower was inaugurated officially on 5 December 2012 by the PM Boyko Borisov and the minister of transport Ivaylo Moskovski.

The tower was built by Glavbolgarstroy AD. The contract for building the tower was signed on 19 August 2011 in the presence of Ivaylo Moskovski, minister of transport, information technology and communications, the BULATSA director general Diyan Dinev, Glavbolgarstroy AD chief executive director Pavel Kalistratov and Glavbolgarstroy AD executive director and management board member Nina Stoyanova signed the design execution and construction contract between BULATSA and Glavbolgarstroy AD for the new control tower at Sofia Airport (Sofia tower). Glavbolgartroy AD were selected as contractor, as they were awarded the highest technical rating during the public procurement procedure having proposed the shortest construction timeframe. This project was financed entirely by BULATSA.

=== Runway system ===
On 31 August 2006, Sofia Airport put its new runway system into operation, replacing the old and out-of-date facilities. The new runway is offset 210 m (690 ft) to the north of the old runway, with the eastern end of its 3,600 m (11,811 ft) long strip crossing over the Iskar river bed on a specially constructed bridge. New rapid and connecting taxiways were built to open way for 20 aircraft movements per hour at a high level of safety. The navigational aids installed on the new runway enable landing operations under low visibility conditions at category IIIB of the ICAO standards.

Two de-icing platforms were constructed to allow centralised de-icing procedures in winter. They are one element in the overall strategy of Sofia Airport for environmental protection and reduction of the harmful effects resulting from the airport operations. At the moment there is another de-icing platform under construction.

=== Lufthansa Technik Sofia ===
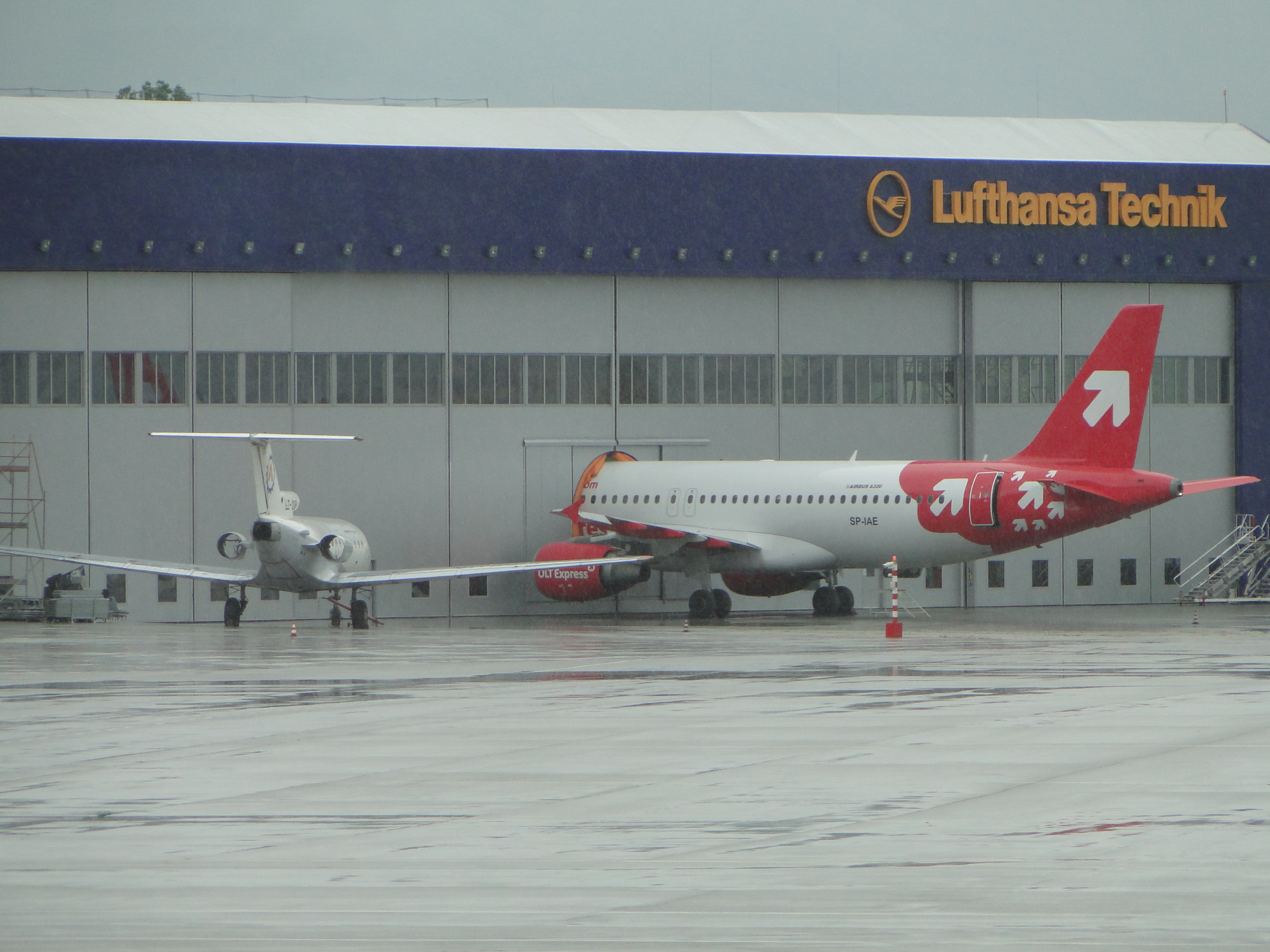
Lufthansa Technik maintenance base at Sofia Airport

Lufthansa Technik Sofia was founded in late 2007 as a joint venture between Lufthansa Technik (75.1%) and the Bulgarian Aviation Group (24.9%). With the foundation of Lufthansa Technik Sofia, the Lufthansa Technik Group has created a fifth platform for the overhaul and maintenance of narrowbody aircraft in Europe. The Bulgarian facility serves customers in Europe, the Middle East and North Africa. The facility has undergone a major reconstruction and an upgrade and now can handle the heaviest stage of aircraft maintenance checks, D-Check, that is now being carried out in Bulgaria. The company have started with more than 350 staff trained in Bulgaria and at Lufthansa Technik facilities in Shannon Base Maintenance operations in the fourth quarter of 2008 with one Airbus A321 from Lufthansa as the first customer. At the moment the facility in Sofia has more than 1100 employees and plans by the 2018 to hire another 200 employees to reach a total of 1300 employees. The company have completed the building of a new facility in October 2017 which will be used for the maintenance of wide-bodied aircraft and is able to handle Airbus A380. With the completion of the new hangar now Lufthansa Technik Sofia has 8 production lines which is turning the Bulgarian unit into the biggest unit of Lufthansa Technik.

=== Rose Air Technik ===
On 4 July 2018, Rose Air in cooperation with Wizz Air opened a new maintenance base at Sofia Airport. It is located at the northern part of the airport. The hangar lies on 5000 square meters, has three production lines with overall capacity of 300 planes per year and can handle C-Check. The base started with more than 100 staff. This will be the first maintenance base for Wizz Air in the Balkans and the fourth in Europe.

=== Vrazhdebna Air Base ===
The Vrazhdebna Air Base (also Vrajdebna Air Base) is located at the airport. Operated by the Bulgarian Air Force, it is home to the 16th Transport Squadron.

== Terminals ==
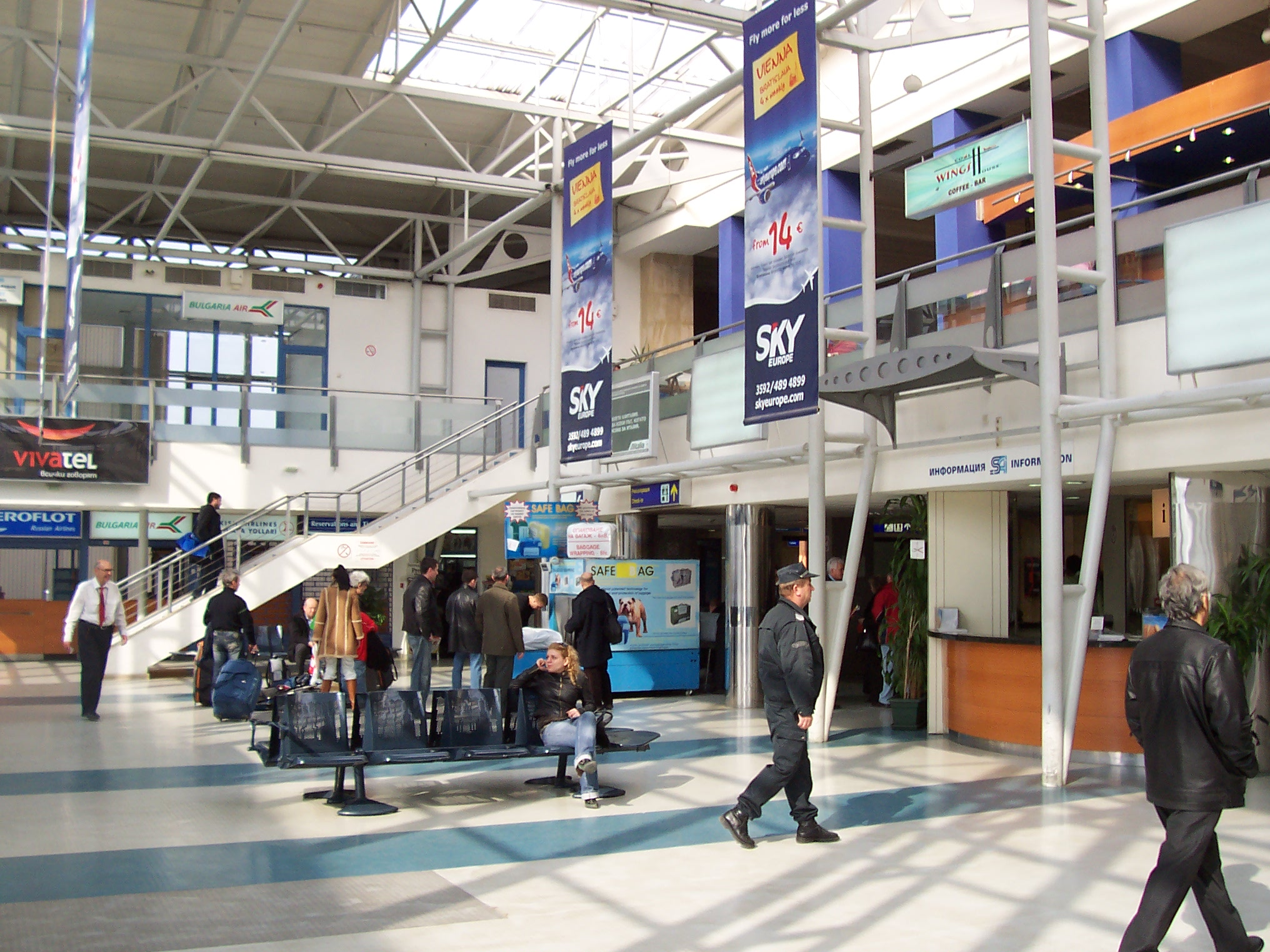
Inside Terminal 1

=== Terminal 1 ===
This terminal was built in the 1930s and opened on 16 September 1937. It has been extended many times, and had a renovation in 2000. Terminal 1 serves low-cost and charter carriers with Wizz Air, easyJet and European Air Charter being the primary tenants. This smaller of the two terminals, consisting of only one main level, features a central check-in hall with 19 counters, two security screening and customs areas and a central waiting area split into two equal sections containing overall seven departure gates for bus boarding.

=== Terminal 2 ===
Terminal 2 was officially opened on 27 December 2006 with the symbolic arrival of Bulgaria Air flight FB 408 from Brussels. It was one of the biggest projects in Bulgaria to receive funds from the EU ISPA programme. The price included the new terminal, new aircraft parking aprons, upgrading the existing aircraft parking aprons and the construction of connecting taxiways. The terminal has seven air-bridges (gates A1, B5–9 and C1), 38 check-in desks and covers an area of 50,000 m^{2} (540,000 sq ft) and has a car park for 820 vehicles. It is located to the east of Terminal 1 and is significantly bigger than the old one which continues to serve low-cost and charter airlines. From 16 January 2017 on Terminal 2 currently serves only one low-cost airline - Ryanair.

For the first time in Bulgaria, a terminal has airbridge-equipped gates instead of relying on airside buses.

At the eastern end of the Terminal, a terminus for Line 1 of the Sofia Metro has been built under the name Sofia Airport Metro Station. It was brought into service on 2 April 2015. The journey between airport and central Sofia takes about 20 minutes with service provided during 05:30-24:00 hrs.

The infrastructure surrounding the building was expected to be completed in 2007. It includes a new dual carriageway road connecting the terminal to the existing airport road, and landscaping including an artificial lake and a fountain. Terminal 2 is designed with special attention to disabled passengers. Their access to the different terminal levels and the multi-storey car park is facilitated via lifts and escalators.

=== Terminal 3 ===
Terminal 1 and Terminal 2 will be redesigned so that passengers feel "immersed in Bulgarian culture". This is the development plan of the SOF Connect consortium, which won the concession at Sofia Airport. The new Terminal 3 will be built by 2030. This will be the main focus for this period and will be implemented along with the usage of Terminal 1 for VIP and business aviation services only. Terminal 3 is planned to be 65,000 m² facility designed to enhance the airport's capacity and services. The terminal will feature four levels, including technical operations, arrivals, departures with over 10,000 m² of commercial space, and areas for connecting flights. It will offer 52 check-in counters, advanced baggage handling systems, and amenities for families, business travelers, and passengers with reduced mobility. Terminal 3 aims to achieve a 5-star Skytrax rating, positioning Sofia Airport as a leading regional hub in Eastern Europe. It will cost €250 million.

=== Other facilities ===
The VIP terminal is located in the western wing of Terminal 1 and has an entrance of its own, providing an access to four separate rooms – one main room and two separated rooms with about 20 seats each.

The Government terminal is located in the western side of Sofia Airport. The terminal is operated by the 28th Air Detachment which operates government aircraft and operations involving the President, Prime Minister and other high-ranking government officials.

== Airlines and destinations ==
=== Passenger ===
In 1937, Sofia was used on a route from Berlin to Athens, and by 1938, regular direct flights linked Sofia to Belgrade. Just before the end of the one-party socialist state at the end of the 1980s BALKAN (Bulgarian Airlines) were operating both domestic, and mainly European international routes, to numerous destinations, carrying 2.8m passengers. The airport is used for scheduled, charter and seasonal operations on many European routes and on several further afield.

The following airlines operate regular scheduled and charter flights to and from Sofia:

Airlines	Destinations
Aegean Airlines	Athens
Air Serbia	Belgrade
airBaltic	Riga
airHaifa	Seasonal: Haifa
Arkia	Tel Aviv
Austrian Airlines	Vienna
BH Air	Seasonal charter: Doha
Bluebird Airways	Seasonal: Tel Aviv
British Airways	London–Heathrow
Bulgaria Air	Amsterdam, Athens, Berlin, Brussels, Burgas, Frankfurt, London–Heathrow, Madrid, Milan–Malpensa, Paris–Charles de Gaulle, Prague, Rome–Fiumicino, Tel Aviv, Varna, Zürich; Seasonal: Barcelona, Heraklion, Lisbon, Palma de Mallorca,
easyJet	Paris–Orly; Seasonal: London–Gatwick, Manchester
El Al	Tel Aviv
Flydubai	Dubai–International
Flyyo	Seasonal charter: Tel Aviv
GullivAir	Seasonal: Bangkok–Suvarnabhumi, Malé, Phuket Yerevan
Israir Airlines	Tel Aviv
LOT Polish Airlines	Warsaw–Chopin
Lufthansa	Frankfurt, Munich
Lufthansa City Airlines	Munich
Norwegian Air Shuttle	Seasonal: Helsinki, Oslo
Pegasus Airlines	Antalya, Istanbul–Sabiha Gökçen
Ryanair	Alicante, Amman, Barcelona, Bari, Beauvais, Bergamo, Berlin, Birmingham, Bologna, Bristol, Budapest, Catania, Charleroi, Cologne/Bonn, Copenhagen, Dublin, Edinburgh, Eindhoven, Hahn, Karlsruhe/Baden-Baden, Kraków, Lamezia Terme, Liverpool, London–Stansted, Madrid, Málaga, Malta, Memmingen, Naples, Nuremberg, Palermo, Palma de Mallorca, Paphos, Pisa, Rome–Ciampino, Valencia, Vienna, Warsaw–Modlin, Wrocław; Seasonal: Chania, Corfu, Rhodes, Skiathos, Zadar
Sky Express	Athens
SunExpress	Seasonal: Antalya, İzmir
Swiss International Air Lines	Zürich
TAROM	Bucharest–Otopeni
Transavia	Paris–Orly
TUI Airways	Seasonal: Birmingham, London–Gatwick, Manchester, Newcastle upon Tyne; Seasonal charter: Dublin
Turkish Airlines	Istanbul
Wizz Air	Abu Dhabi, Barcelona, Bari, Basel/Mulhouse, Beauvais, Bergamo, Berlin, Budapest, Charleroi, Chișinău, Dortmund, Eindhoven,Hamburg, Kraków, Larnaca, London–Luton, Lyon, Madrid, Málaga, Memmingen, Naples, Nice, Palermo, Prague, Rome–Fiumicino, Sharm El Sheikh, Stuttgart, Tel Aviv, Turin, Valencia, Warsaw–Modlin; Seasonal: Alghero, Corfu, Hurghada, Lamezia Terme, Marrakesh, Palma de Mallorca, Rhodes, Rimini, Santander, Tirana

=== Cargo ===
Airlines	Destinations
Compass Cargo Airlines	Liege, Zhengzhou
DHL Aviation	Leipzig/Halle
SolitAir	Dubai–Al Maktoum
Swiftair	Cologne/Bonn

== Statistics ==
=== Traffic ===
Traffic at Sofia Airport
Year	Passengers	Change	Cargo (tonnes)	Change	Aircraft movements	Change
1998	1,250,700	Steady	10,180	Steady	24,726	Steady
1999	1,236,610	▼1.1%	12,378	▲21.6%	25,178	▲1.8%
2000	1,127,866	▼8.8%	11,036	▼10.8%	24,785	▼1.6%
2001	1,107,682	▼1.8%	10,381	▼5.9%	21,860	▼11.8%
2002	1,214,198	▲9.6%	12,482	▲20.2%	24,211	▲10.8%
2003	1,356,469	▲11.7%	13,461	▲7.8%	25,517	▲5.4%
2004	1,614,304	▲19.0%	14,472	▲7.5%	28,700	▲12.5%
2005	1,874,000	▲16.1%	14,725	▲1.7%	32,188	▲12.2%
2006	2,209,350	▲17.9%	15,241	▲3.5%	38,119	▲18.4%
2007	2,745,880	▲24.3%	17,392	▲14.1%	43,005	▲12.8%
2008	3,230,696	▲17.7%	18,294	▲5.2%	48,626	▲13.1%
2009	3,134,657	▼3.0%	15,093	▼17.5%	45,698	▼6.0%
2010	3,296,936	▲5.2%	15,322	▲1.5%	47,061	▲3.0%
2011	3,474,933	▲5.4%	15,887	▲3.7%	47,153	▲0.2%
2012	3,467,455	▼0.2%	16,249	▲2.3%	40,806	▼9.0%
2013	3,504,326	▲1.1%	17,039	▲4.9%	40,526	▼0.7%
2014	3,815,158	▲8.9%	17,741	▲4.1%	42,120	▲4.0%
2015	4,088,943	▲7.2%	18,727	▲5.6%	44,416	▲5.5%
2016	4,979,760	▲21.8%	20,886	▲11.5%	51,829	▲16.7%
2017	6,490,096	▲30.3%	20,818	▼0.3%	57,673	▲11.3%
2018	6,962,040	▲7.3%	22,251	▲6.6%	60,771	▲5.4%
2019	7,107,096	▲2.1%	23,987	▲7.8%	61,371	▲1.0%
2020	2,937,846	▼58.7%	23,042	▼3.9%	35,954	▼41.4%
2021	3,364,151	▲14.5%	21,141	▼8.3%	40,771	▲13.4%
2022	6,003,653	▲78.4%	20,528	▼2.8%	53,722	▲31.7%
2023	7,208,987	▲20.8%	19,688	▼4.1%	60,561	▲12.6%
2024	7,922,702	▲9.9%	21,887	▲11.2%	65,764	▲8.6%
2025	8,413,762	▲6.2%	21,897	▲0.1%	68,064	▲3.5%

=== Busiest destinations ===
Top 10 busiest departure destinations at Sofia Airport (2025)
Rank	Destination	Airport(s)	Airlines	Passengers
1.	London	Heathrow Airport, Gatwick Airport, Luton Airport, Stansted Airport	British Airways, Bulgaria Air, easyJet, Ryanair, Wizz Air	357,674
2.	Vienna	Vienna Airport	Austrian Airlines, Bulgaria Air, Ryanair	216,000
3.	Istanbul	Istanbul Airport, Sabiha Gökçen Airport	Pegasus Airlines, Turkish Airlines	204,349
4.	Frankfurt	Frankfurt Airport, Frankfurt-Hahn Airport	Bulgaria Air, Lufthansa, Wizz Air	173,638
5.	Milan	Malpensa Airport, Orio al Serio Airport	Bulgaria Air, Ryanair, Wizz Air	168,958
6.	Tel Aviv	David Ben Gurion Airport	Bulgaria Air, El Al, FLYYO, Israir, TUS Airways, Wizz Air	147,562
7.	Rome	Ciampino–G. B. Pastine Airport, Leonardo da Vinci–Fiumicino Airport	Bulgaria Air, ITA Airways, Ryanair, Wizz Air	141,491
8.	Munich	Memmingen Airport, Munich Airport	Lufthansa, Ryanair, Wizz Air	132,247
9.	Barcelona	El Prat Airport	Bulgaria Air, Ryanair, Wizz Air	118,623
10.	Varna	Varna Airport	Bulgaria Air	114,364

=== Top carriers ===
Rank	Carrier	Market share (2021)
1	Wizz Air	29.3%
2	Ryanair	24.8%
3	Bulgaria Air	15.9%
4	Lufthansa	8.6%
5	Turkish Airlines	3.9%
6	Austrian Airlines	3.2%
7	Aegean Airlines	1.8%
8	easyJet	1.8%
9	LOT Polish Airlines	1.4%
10	flydubai	1.3%

== Ground transportation ==
=== Metro ===
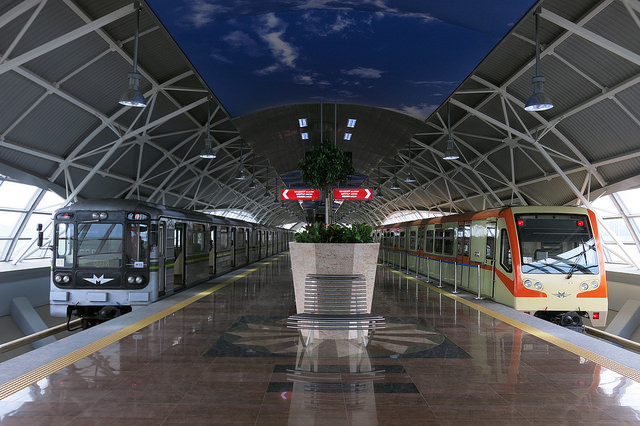
Sofia Airport Metro Station

Sofia Airport Metro Station on the M4 line is situated next to Terminal 2 and provides connections to the city centre.

A free shuttle bus service between Terminal 1 and Terminal 2 runs from 05:00 until 23:00, connecting arriving and departing passengers from Terminal 1 to metro services.

Sofia Metro also provides a fast connection between the airport and Business Park Sofia, through interchange at Mladost 1 Metro Station to the M1 line.

=== Bus ===
One bus route serve the airport. Bus line 84 connect both terminals to the city centre. It starts its route from Terminal 2 of Sofia Airport, passing through Terminal 1 of Sofia Airport on its way to the city centre.

=== Car ===
Brussels Boulevard is the main thoroughfare to Sofia Airport. There is a new, faster road connection built from Terminal 2 to Brussels Boulevard.

Via Brussels Boulevard and Tsarigradsko shose, Sofia Airport is connected to both the city centre and eastbound destinations via Trakia motorway (A1)

From the northern parts of Sofia, Sofia Airport is conveniently accessible via the East Tangent route. Its junction with Botevgradsko Shose provides access to northbound destinations via Hemus motorway (A2)

Connecting to the southern parts of Sofia and Southwestern Bulgaria is the route via Brussels Boulevard and Boulevard Aleksandar Malinov to Sofia ring road which has an interchange with southbound Struma motorway (A3)

=== Train ===
A railway station at Iskarsko shose was inaugurated in April 2015, providing faster interchange from the airport to southbound services on the Bulgarian national railway system. Situated about 2.5 km (2 mi) from Terminal 2, the train station is accessible via a short trip to Iskarsko shose Metro Station which is two stops away from Sofia Airport Metro Station on the M4 line.

=== Taxi ===
As of May 2023, Yellow! taxi company has been officially selected as the official and licensed operator for a period of five years, with a possibility of further extension with 3 more, following a tender with other larger taxi companies. Starting 1 January 2025, a minimum of 5% of the monthly taxi journeys operated from the airport should be conducted using electric vehicles and a year later the percentage should be increased to 10%.

=== Airport transfers ===
Passengers arriving at Sofia Airport could order an individual airport transfer to any point in Sofia City or the country. Private companies usually do this and the price varies according to the destination and the individual wishes of the client. There are many companies that offer reliable airport transfers.

== Incidents and accidents ==
- On 22 December 1971, a Balkan Airlines Il-18 crashed en route to Algeria. 28 people on board died.
- On 22 November 1975, a Balkan Bulgarian airlines An-24 crashed short of the runway after take-off in icy conditions. Of the 48 people on board, three were killed.
- On 10 January 1984, a Balkan Bulgarian Airlines Tupolev Tu-134 crashed on approach in bad weather. All 50 people on board died.
- On 2 August 1988, a Balkan Airlines Yak-40 crashed in the Iskar river. There were 29 fatalities among the 37 passengers on board.

== See also ==
- List of airports in Bulgaria
- List of airlines of Bulgaria
- List of the busiest airports in Europe by passenger traffic
