= European Air Charter (Bulgarian airline) =

Charter airline of Bulgaria

European Air Charter Юръпиън еър чартър
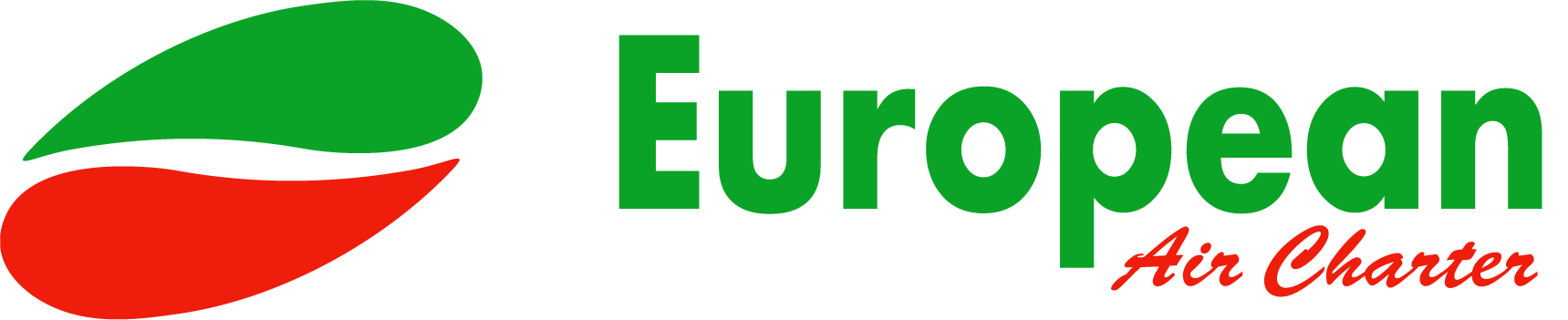

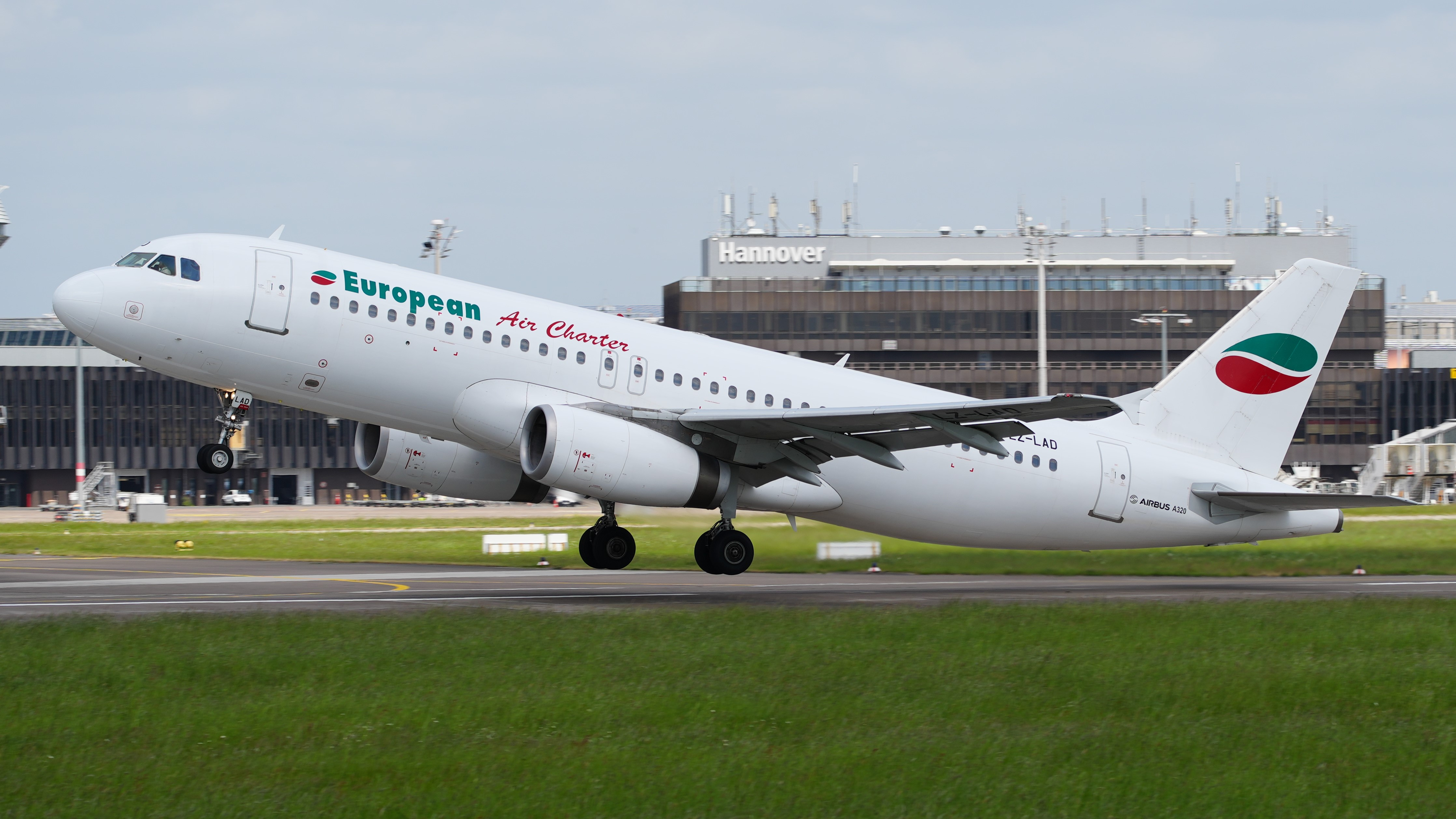
- Airbus A320-200
IATA	ICAO	Call sign
H6	BUC	BUC
- Founded: 2000; 26 years ago (as Bulgarian Air Charter)
- Operating bases: Munich; Pristina; Tel Aviv; Sofia
- Fleet size: 10
- Headquarters: Sofia, Bulgaria
- Key people: Dimitar Datzev
- Revenue: ▲€82 million (2017)
- Net income: ▲€8.4 million (2017)
- Employees: 580+
- Website: www.euaircharter.com

European Air Charter (Bulgarian: Юръпиън еър чартър) (formerly Bulgarian Air Charter) is a Bulgarian ACMI and charter airline with its own in-house maintenance organisation, headquartered in Sofia, Bulgaria. The airline operates an all-Airbus A320 fleet, providing ACMI, wet lease, charter and on-demand flight solutions for airlines and tour operators across Europe, Africa, the Middle East and other international markets.

== History ==
=== Bulgarian Air Charter ===

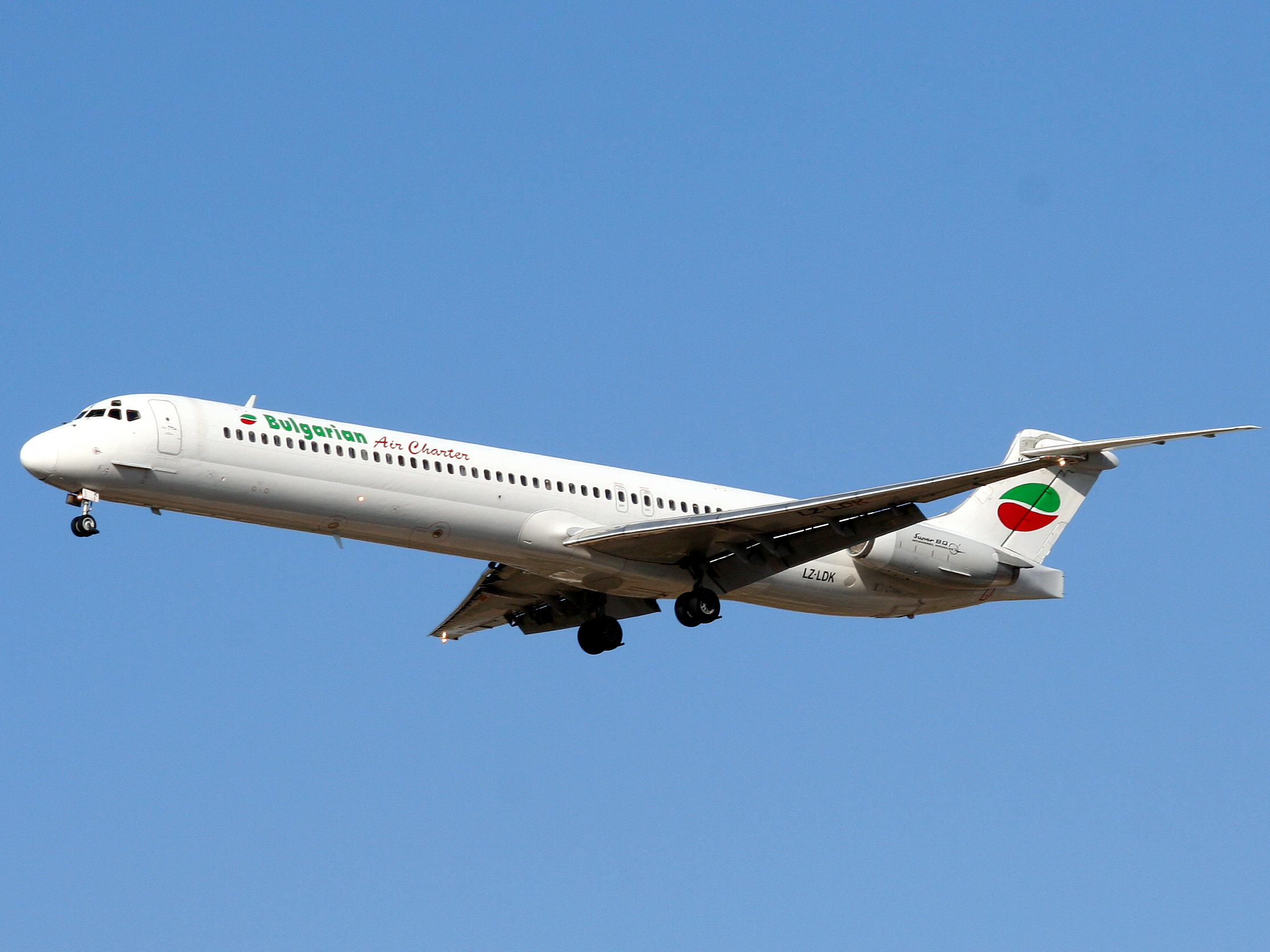
Bulgarian Air Charter McDonnell Douglas MD-82

The airline was established in 2000 under the name Bulgarian Air Charter and began operations on 14 December 2000. During its early years, the company operated charter services mainly from Bulgarian airports to leisure destinations in Europe, the Middle East and North Africa.

Bulgarian Air Charter initially operated Tupolev Tu-154 aircraft, later replacing them with McDonnell Douglas MD-80 series aircraft. The airline expanded its fleet during the 2000s and 2010s and became one of the last European operators of the McDonnell Douglas MD-82.

In 2015, the airline introduced the Airbus A320 family into its fleet, beginning a gradual transition from MD-80 series aircraft to Airbus narrowbody operations.

=== European Air Charter ===
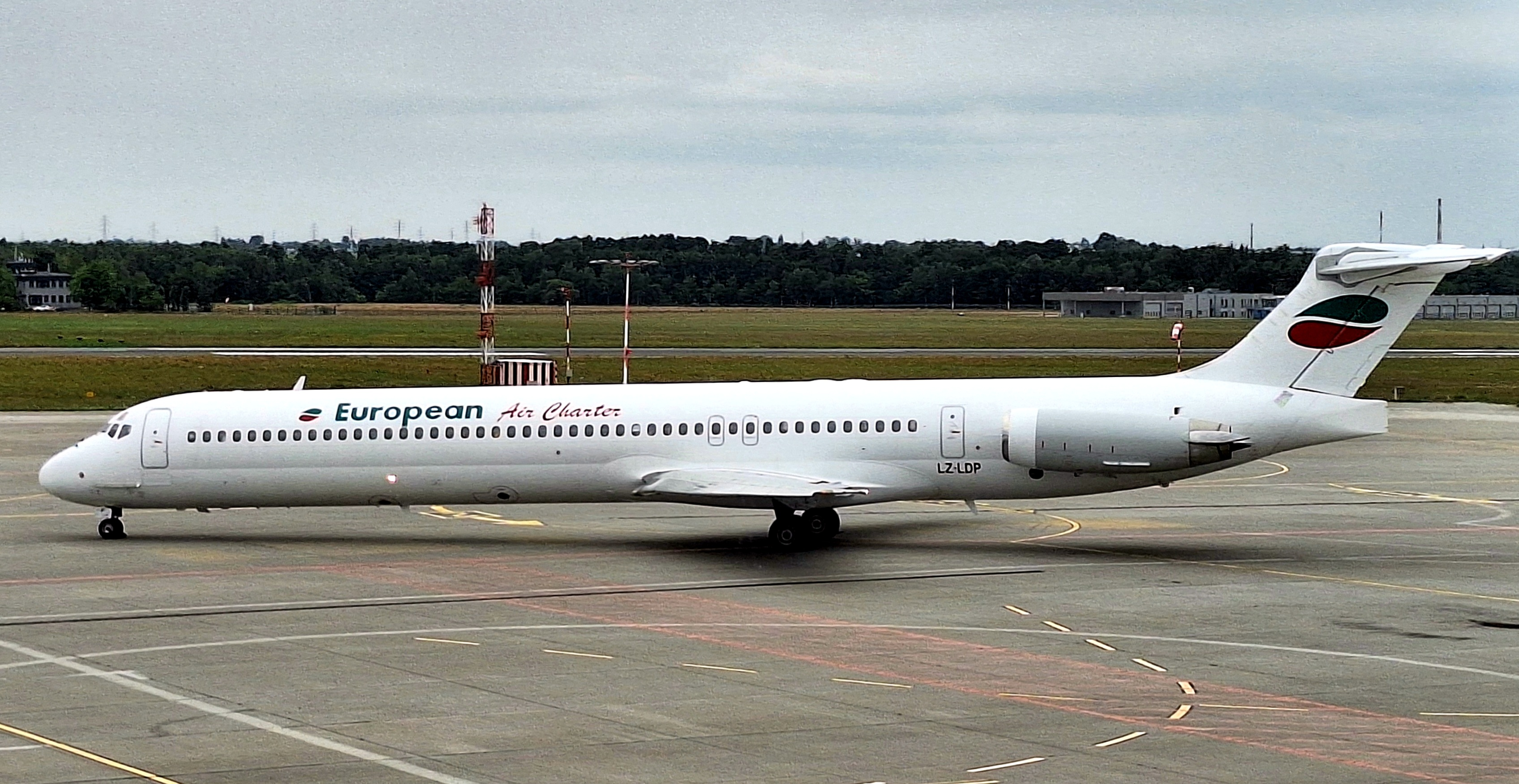
McDonnell Douglas MD-82

In May 2021, Bulgarian Air Charter changed its commercial name to European Air Charter. The rebranding reflected the company’s broader international activity and its growing focus on wet lease and ACMI services.

Following the COVID-19 pandemic, the airline increased its focus on ACMI operations. Its ACMI and wet lease activities include the provision of aircraft, crew, maintenance and insurance to partner airlines, while the contracting airline retains responsibility for scheduling and commercial operations.

In October 2023, European Air Charter retired its remaining McDonnell Douglas MD-82 aircraft, completing the transition to an all-Airbus A320 fleet. The airline has since continued to expand its Airbus A320 fleet in line with its ACMI, wet lease and charter operations.

== Operations ==
European Air Charter operates primarily as an ACMI and wet lease provider, while also offering charter and on-demand flight services for airlines and tour operators. Its operations include seasonal capacity, short- and medium-haul flying, and dedicated charter services across Europe, Africa, the Middle East and other international destinations.

The airline has operated ACMI partnerships with carriers including Condor, GP Aviation, BlueBird, TUS Airways. Its ACMI model provides aircraft, crew, maintenance and insurance, while partner airlines manage the commercial and scheduling aspects of the operation.

The airline’s crews are trained according to EASA requirements and partner airline procedures. Training includes recurrent safety training, Crew Resource Management and service-specific preparation for partner operations.

== Maintenance ==
A key part of European Air Charter’s operation is its own in-house maintenance organisation, based at Sofia Airport. The facility supports the airline’s Airbus A320 fleet and provides line maintenance, base maintenance, component services, structural repairs and non-destructive testing.

The company’s maintenance organisation holds EASA Part-145 approval. Its capabilities include maintenance services for Airbus A320 family aircraft, Boeing 737 Classic and Next Generation and MD-80 series aircraft.

Maintenance services include routine line checks, overnight checks, aircraft defect rectification, base maintenance, heavy maintenance inspections, component repair and overhaul, borescope inspections, non-destructive testing and aircraft-on-ground support.

== Training partnerships ==
European Air Charter works with Approved Training Organisations to provide Airbus A320 base training and supervised line flying. The training is conducted on the airline’s Airbus A320 fleet and is intended for ATOs and accredited training providers rather than individual pilot applicants.

The programme includes A320 aerodrome base training after the simulator phase of the type rating. The airline also offers partner ATOs the option to place pilots for supervised line flying and initial operational experience under qualified instructors.

== Fleet ==
=== Current fleet ===
As of June 2026, European Air Charter operates an all-Airbus A320 fleet:

Aircraft	In service	Orders	Passengers	Notes
Airbus A320-200	10	—	180	Used for ACMI, wet lease, charter and on-demand flight operations
Total	10	—		

=== Former fleet ===
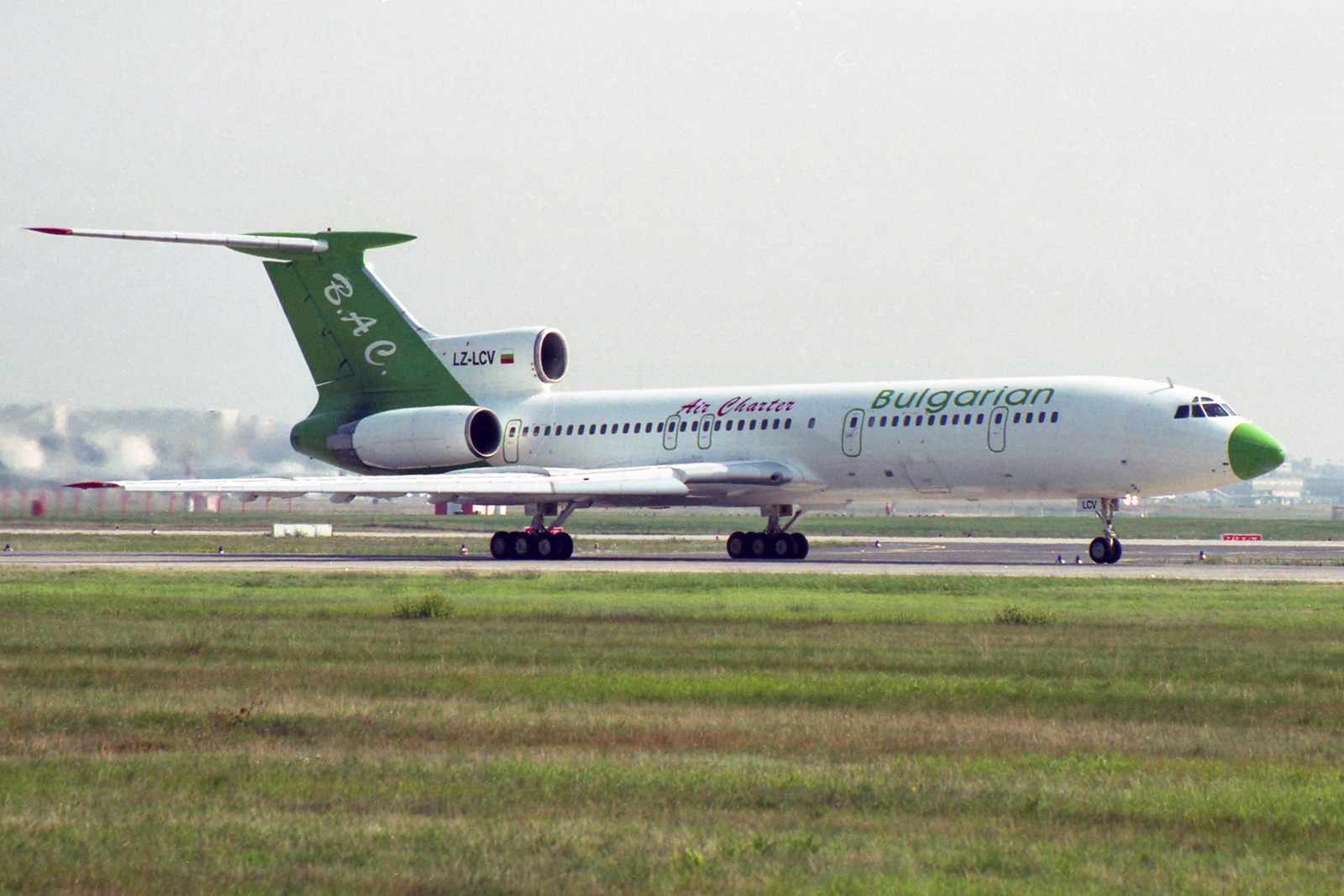
Tupolev TU-154M

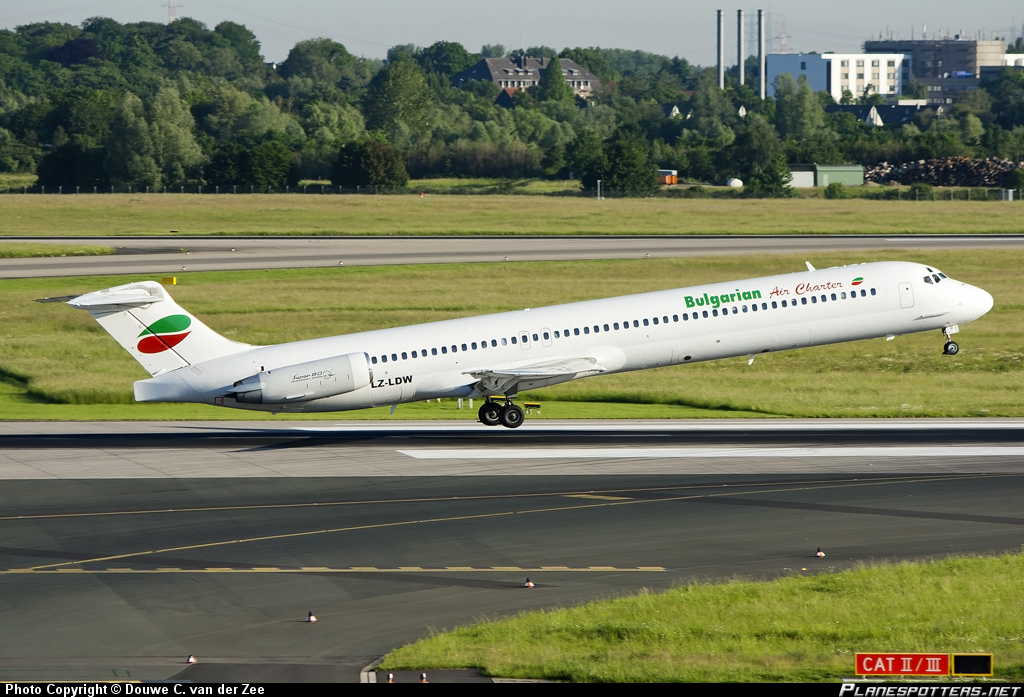
McDonnell Douglas MD-82

European Air Charter and its predecessor Bulgarian Air Charter previously operated Tupolev Tu-154 and McDonnell Douglas MD-82 aircraft. The MD-82 fleet was phased out in October 2023.

== See also ==
- List of airlines of Bulgaria
