= Brussels Boulevard =

Boulevard in Sofia, Bulgaria

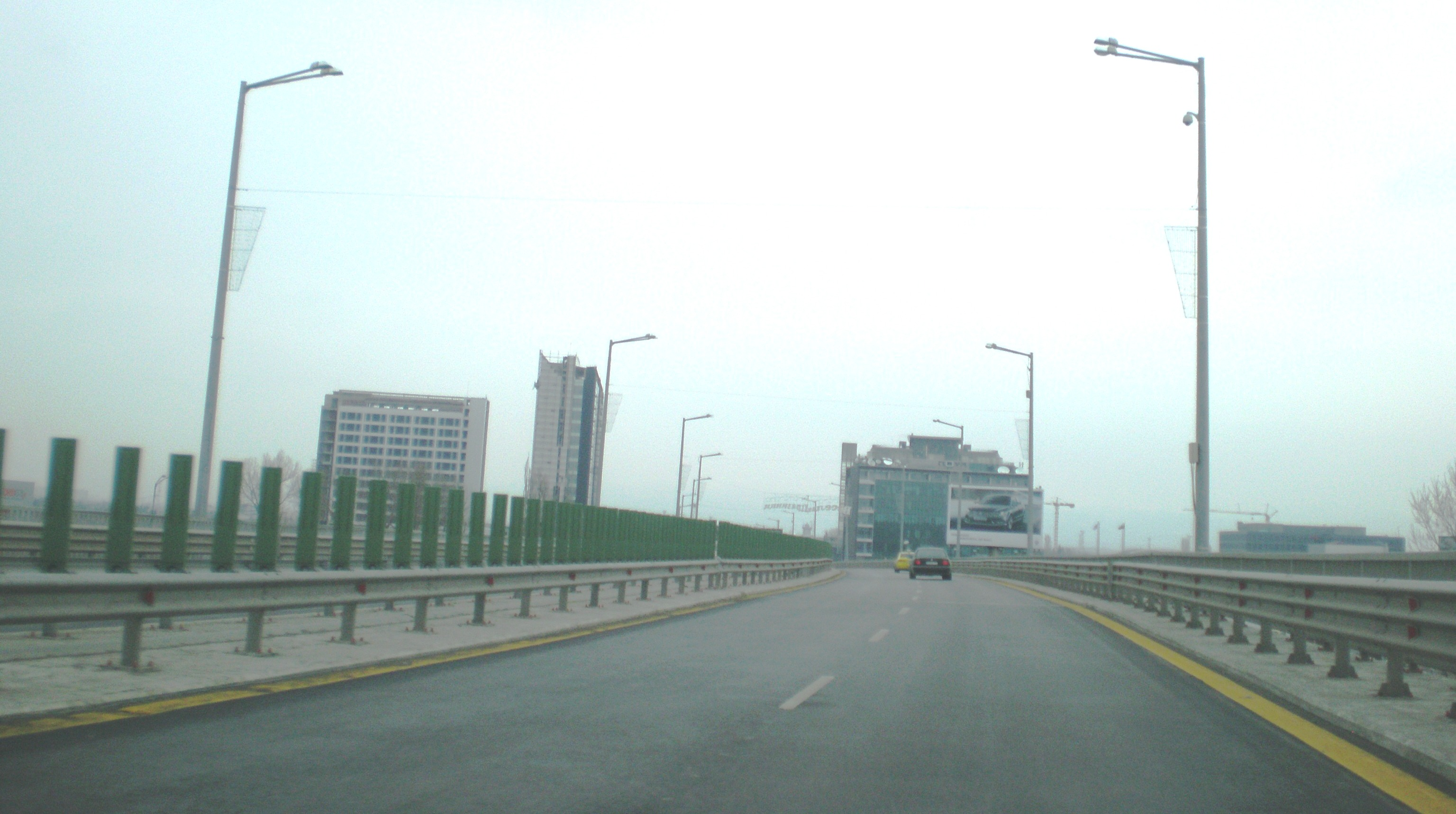
Brussels Boulevard

Brussels Boulevard (Bulgarian: Булевард „Брюксел“) is a boulevard in district of Iskar, east Sofia. The boulevard connects Sofia Airport with Tsarigradsko shose.

The boulevard was reconstructed in 2010. The reconstruction incorporated the first soundproof road barriers in Bulgaria on both sides of the overpass section of the boulevard.
