= Flyyo =

Romanian airline

Flyyo SRL

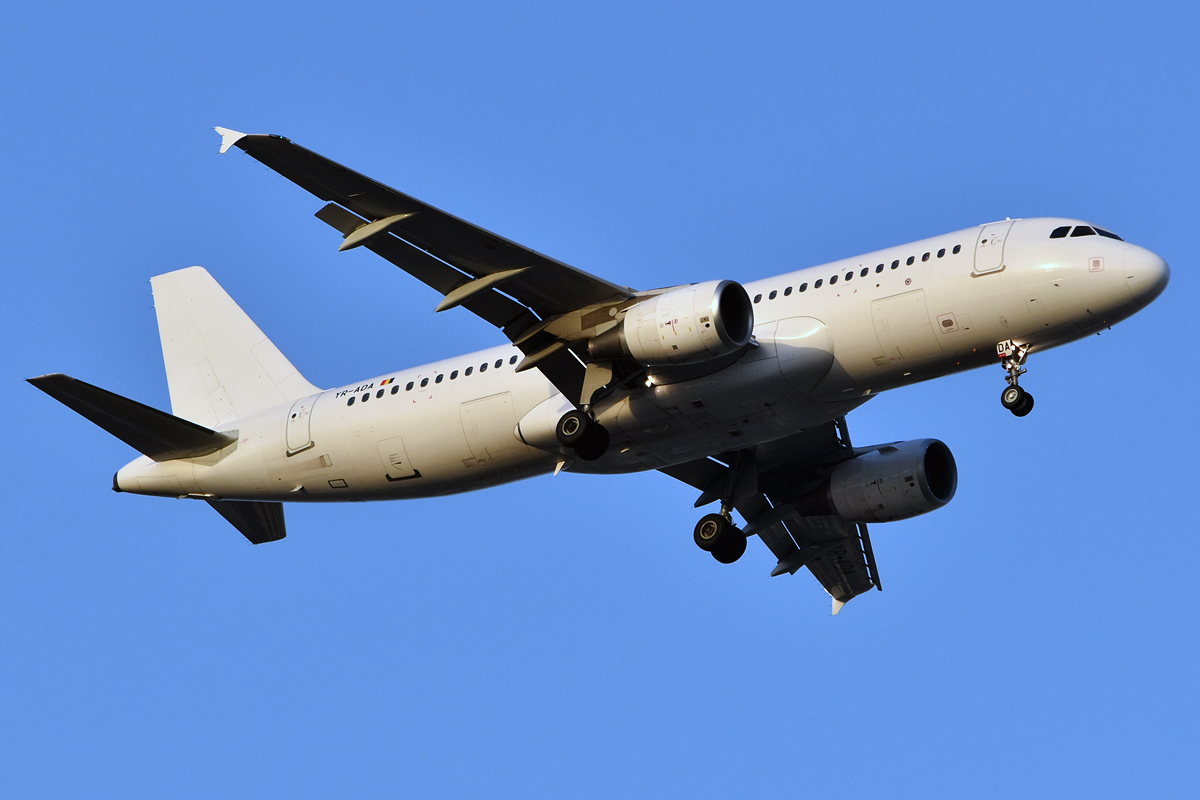
| IATA | ICAO | Call sign |
|---|---|---|
| 4D | DIR | DIREKT WINGS |
- Founded: 2021
- Operating bases: Bucharest–Henri Coandă
- Focus cities: Tel Aviv
- Fleet size: 3
- Destinations: 27
- Headquarters: Bucharest, Romania
- Key people: Ziv Mayberg (CEO)
- Website: flyyo.com

Flyyo SRL, formerly known as Aerro Direkt SRL, is a Romanian airline headquartered in Bucharest that operates commercial charter flights and provides ACMI services.

== History ==
The airline was founded in 2021 and initially operated under the name Aerro Direkt, providing ACMI and charter services.

In early March 2023, Aerro Direkt suspended flight operations after Air Moldova terminated the ACMI agreement covering the airline's only Airbus A321-200, registered YR-ADI. Following a change of ownership, the airline was rebranded as Flyyo, returned the Airbus A321 to its lessor and added an Airbus A320-200 leased from Air Lease Corporation.

On 5 April 2024, Flyyo resumed revenue operations after nearly 15 months. The Airbus A320-200 was initially deployed under a short-term ACMI agreement with Nouvelair, operating flights from Tunis to Paris–Charles de Gaulle and Lille on behalf of the Tunisian airline.

In January 2025, Flyyo received Third Country Operator approval from the UK Civil Aviation Authority. In February 2025, Flyyo signed annual charter agreements with Israeli tour operators for flights from Tel Aviv to 26 destinations across Europe.

== Destinations ==
As of February 2025, FLYYO plan to operate seasonal charter flights to the following destinations:

| Country | City | Airport | Notes | Refs |
|---|---|---|---|---|
| Bulgaria | Sofia | Vasil Levski Sofia Airport | Seasonal charter | |
| Croatia | Pula | Pula Airport | Seasonal charter | |
| Croatia | Split | Split Airport | Terminated | |
| Croatia | Zadar | Zadar Airport | Seasonal charter | |
| Cyprus | Larnaca | Larnaca International Airport | Terminated | |
| Cyprus | Paphos | Paphos International Airport | Terminated | |
| Czech Republic | Karlovy Vary | Karlovy Vary Airport | | |
| France | Paris | Charles de Gaulle Airport | Seasonal charter | |
| France | Lyon | Lyon–Saint-Exupéry Airport | Terminated | |
| France | Strasbourg | Strasbourg Airport | Terminated | |
| France; Germany; Switzerland | Mulhouse; Freiburg; Basel | EuroAirport Basel Mulhouse Freiburg | Terminated | |
| Czech Republic | Karlovy Vary | Karlovy Vary Airport | | |
| Greece | Athens | Athens International Airport | Terminated | |
| Greece | Heraklion | Heraklion International Airport "Nikos Kazantzakis" | Seasonal charter | |
| Greece | Kalamata | Kalamata International Airport | Terminated | |
| Greece | Mytilene | Mytilene International Airport | Seasonal charter | |
| Greece | Rhodes | Rhodes International Airport | Seasonal charter | |
| Hungary | Budapest | Budapest Ferenc Liszt International Airport | Seasonal charter | |
| Israel | Tel Aviv | David Ben Gurion International Airport | Focus city | |
| Italy | Catania | Catania–Fontanarossa Airport | Seasonal charter | |
| Italy | Venice | Venice Marco Polo Airport | Terminated | |
| Lithuania | Vilnius | Vilnius Čiurlionis International Airport | Seasonal charter | |
| Lithuania | Kaunas | Kaunas Airport | Seasonal charter | |
| Malta | Luqa | Malta International Airport | Seasonal charter | |
| Poland | Kraków | Kraków John Paul II International Airport | Terminated | |
| Romania | Bucharest | Bucharest Henri Coandă International Airport | Base | |
| Slovakia | Bratislava | Bratislava M. R. Štefánik Airport | Terminated | |
| Slovakia | Piešťany | Piešťany Airport | Terminated | |

== Fleet ==
As of August 2025, FLYYO operates the following aircraft:

FLYYO fleet
| Aircraft | In service | Orders | Passengers | | | Notes |
| Aircraft | In service | Orders | C | Y | Total | Notes |
|---|---|---|---|---|---|---|
| Airbus A320-200 | 3 | — | — | 180 | 180 | |
| Total | 3 | — | | | | |
