= Sofiyska Sveta gora metro station =

Sofia metro station

Sofiyska Sveta gora Софийска Света гора
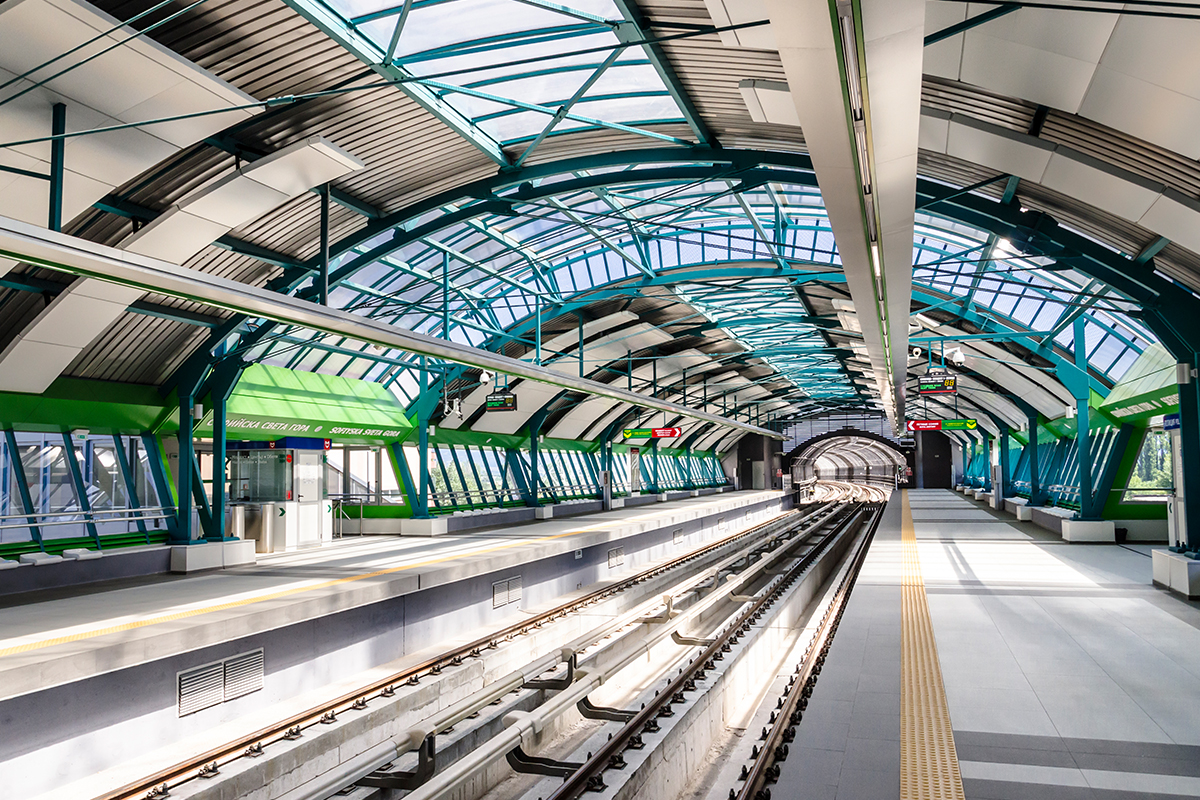
- View of the metro station in the direction to Sofia Airport metro station

General information
- Location: 1528 RPA "Iskar", Sofia
- Coordinates: 42°40′35″N 23°24′37″E
- Owner: Sofia Municipality
- Operator: Metropoliten JSC
- Platforms: side
- Tracks: 2
- Bus routes: 1
- Connections
- Bus: 10

Construction
- Structure type: overground
- Platform levels: 2
- Parking: no
- Cycle facilities: no
- Accessible: an elevator to platforms
- Architect: Atelier "Seraphimovi"

Other information
- Status: Staffed
- Station code: 3035; 3036
- Website: Official website

History
- Opened: 12 April 2015

Services
| Preceding station | Sofia Metro | Following station |
|---|---|---|
| Iskarsko shose towards Slivnitsa | M4 line | Sofia Airport Terminus |
Location

Sofiyska Sveta gora Metro Station (Bulgarian: Метростанция „Софийска Света гора“) is a station on the Sofia Metro in Bulgaria. It started operation on 2 April 2015.

== Interchange with other public transport ==
- City Bus service: 10
