= GullivAir =

Bulgarian airline

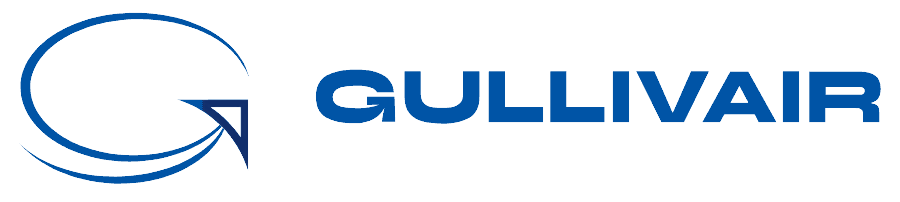

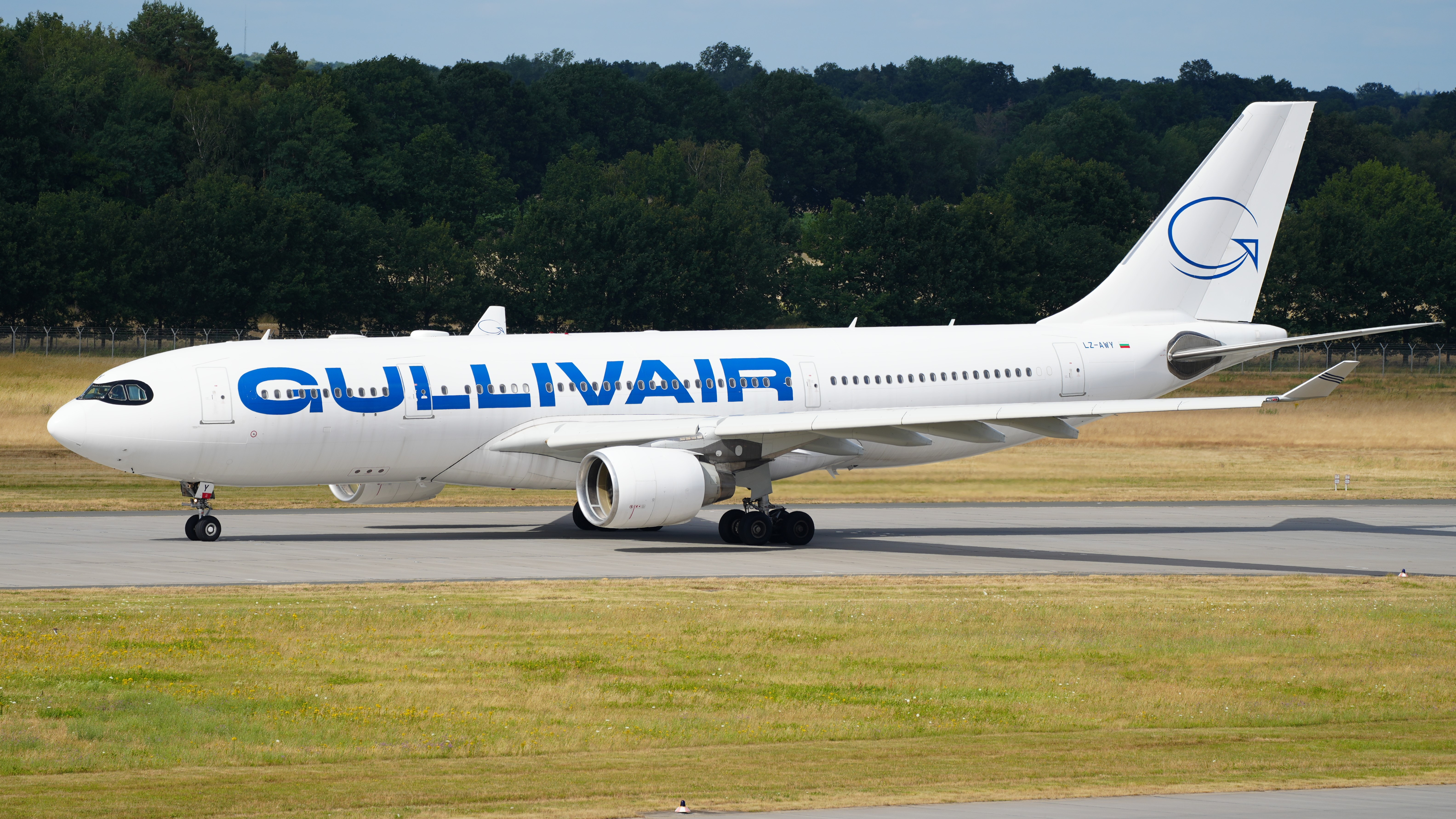
- Airbus A330-200
IATA	ICAO	Call sign
G2	GBG	VAGABOND
- Founded: 2016
- Commenced operations: December 2020
- Operating bases: Vasil Levski Sofia Airport
- Fleet size: 2
- Destinations: charter, ACMI
- Headquarters: Sofia, Bulgaria
- Key people: Yanko Ivanov, CEO
- Website: gullivair.com

GullivAir (Bulgarian: Гъливеър) is a Bulgarian airline headquartered in Sofia.

== History ==
The air carrier was established in 2016 but received its operational license (AOC) from Bulgarian authorities in September 2020 and started operations with a single Airbus A330-200 inherited from Shaheen Air with ad hoc charter services in the following month of December. They have started regular scheduled charters from Bulgaria and Romania to long-haul destinations in the Dominican Republic and the Maldives from December 2020 and also applied to start flights to New York. The airline also announced plans to phase in additional Airbus A330s and ATR 72 aircraft.

GullivAir's first scheduled destination out of Sofia became Burgas. The inauguration flight took place on 15 August 2021. GullivAir made an inaugural flight to Skopje on 26 March 2022, and to Tirana on 2 April 2022. The airline also planned adding domestic flights to Ruse. Plans for regular routes did not materialize and the airline shifted its business to the ACMI market, GullivAir operating flights for airlines such as flyadeal, Corsair International, Air Greenland, Surinam Airways, TUI fly Deutschland and others.

In October 2025 the Government of Bulgaria granted GullivAir the rights to fly to Karachi and Lahore in Pakistan. Those two routes are essential for the plans of the company to start long-haul flights to New York and Chicago from April 2026. As of April 2026, the airline has not yet started commercial flights from Sofia to Pakistan or the US.

== Destinations ==
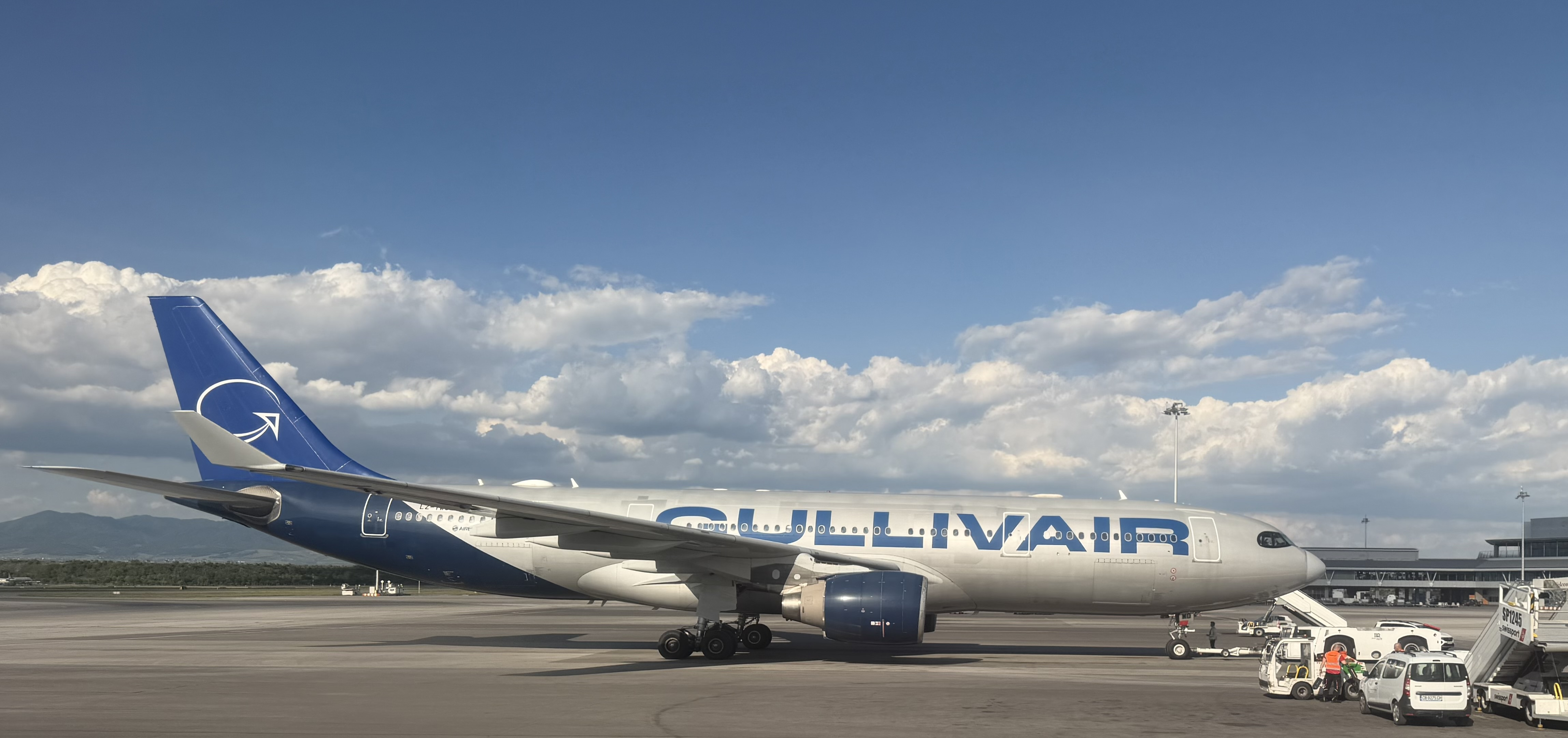
GullivAir's A330-223 at Vasil Levski Sofia Airport

GullivAir operates flights to the following scheduled and charter destinations:

Country	City	Airport	Notes	Refs
Bulgaria	Sofia	Vasil Levski Sofia Airport	Hub	
Dominican Republic	Punta Cana	Punta Cana International Airport	Seasonal Charter	
Maldives	Malé	Velana International Airport	Seasonal Charter	
Romania	Bucharest	Henri Coandă International Airport	Hub	
Sri Lanka	Hambantota	Mattala Rajapaksa International Airport	Seasonal Charter	
Thailand	Phuket	Phuket International Airport	Seasonal Charter	

== Fleet ==
=== Current fleet ===
As of August 2025, GullivAir operates the following aircraft:

GullivAir fleet
Aircraft	Total	Orders	Passengers			Notes
Aircraft	Total	Orders	C	Y	Total	Notes
Airbus A320-200	1	—	—	180	180	Leased from Bulgaria Air
Airbus A330-200	2	—	—	326	326	
Total	3	—				
