= Iskarsko shose Metro Station =

Sofia metro station

Iskarsko shose Искърско шосе
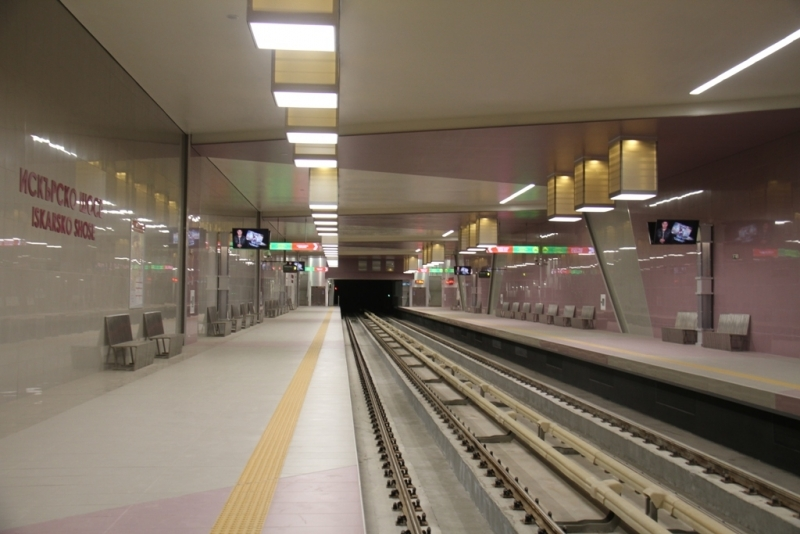

General information
- Location: 1528 RPA "Iskar", Sofia
- Coordinates: 42°40′6″N 23°24′8″E
- Owner: Sofia Municipality
- Operator: Metropoliten JSC
- Platforms: side
- Tracks: 2
- Bus routes: 4
- Connections
- Train: National railway services
- Tram: 20, 23
- Bus: 10, 14, 88, 604

Construction
- Structure type: sub-surface
- Platform levels: 2
- Parking: yes
- Cycle facilities: yes
- Accessible: an elevator to platforms
- Architect: Konstantin Kosev

Other information
- Status: Staffed
- Station code: 3033; 3034
- Website: Official website

History
- Opened: 12 April 2015

Services
Preceding station	Sofia Metro	Following station
Druzhba towards Slivnitsa	M4 line	Sofiyska Sveta gora towards Sofia Airport
Location

Iskarsko shose Metro Station (Bulgarian: Метростанция "Искърско шосе") is a station on the Sofia Metro in Bulgaria. It opened on 2 April 2015.

== Interchange with other public transport ==
- Bulgarian State Railways
- City Bus service: 10, 14, 88, 604
- Tramway service: 20, 23
- Iskarsko Shose railway station
