= Sofia Airport metro station =

Sofia metro station

Sofia Airport Летище София
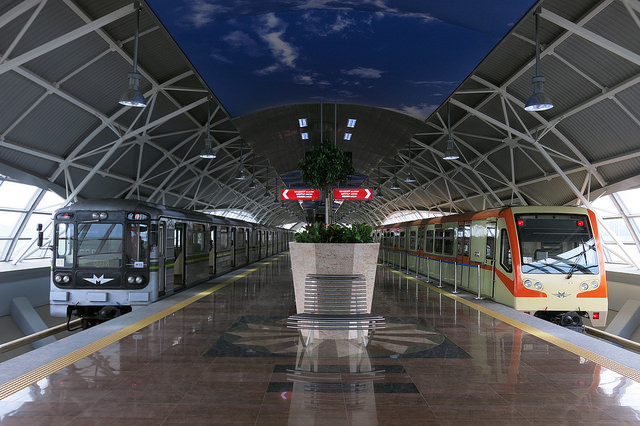
- The two platforms of the metro station

General information
- Location: 1528 Sofia Airport, Sofia
- Coordinates: 42°41′16″N 23°24′58″E
- Elevation: 531 m (1,742 ft)
- Owner: Sofia Municipality
- Operator: Metropoliten JSC
- Platforms: island
- Tracks: 2
- Bus routes: 1
- Connections
- Bus: 84
- Airport: Sofia Airport (Terminal 2)

Construction
- Structure type: overground
- Depth: 16 m (52 ft)
- Platform levels: 1
- Parking: yes
- Cycle facilities: no
- Architect: Radomir Serafimov; Irene Derlipanska

Other information
- Status: Staffed
- Station code: 3037; 3038
- IATA code: SOF
- Website: Official website

History
- Opened: 12 April 2015

Services
Preceding station	Sofia Metro	Following station
Sofiyska Sveta gora towards Slivnitsa	M4 line	Terminus
Location

Sofia Airport Metro Station (Bulgarian: Метростанция „Летище София“) is a station on the Sofia Metro in Bulgaria. It started operation on April 2, 2015.

== Public transportation ==
- Direct connection to Terminal 2 of Sofia Airport
- City Bus service: 84
- Night public buses: N4

== Location and architectural design ==
Sofia Airport Metro Station is the final station of Line M4 of the Sofia Metro and serves the airport directly, being located in close proximity to Terminal 2. The station is located on a reinforced concrete bridge structure. By positioning it at ground level next to the passenger terminal, direct pedestrian access to it is provided at the nearest possible point to the check-in hall.

The station itself rises 16 meters from the ground. The lifting was carried out with the help of massive reinforced concrete foundations by round piles with a diameter of 1200 mm and a length of 16 m, united in groups with reinforced concrete beams. A total of 96 reinforced concrete piles have been made under the 6 foundations. The upper load-bearing structure consists of longitudinal and transverse beams with a connecting plate, on which the load-bearing steel vault structure of the coating is mounted.

The station is 5-8 meters high and 143 meters long. It is formed by a vestibule in its northern part and a centrally located island platform, 123 meters long. The airport is a high-tech site where everything happens in the air, and this is embedded in the design concept of the station - air, light, space, speed and dynamics. The steel cladding of the station is open and harmoniously combined with the side windows, from which light streams all day long. Flowers in huge pots create the feeling of life and continuous rebirth of nature. Above each green corner on the ceiling there is an artificial sky.

The attraction of the station is the impressive figure of the ancient Thracian singer Orpheus, an iconic figure for the Bulgarian lands. The bronze figure of the famous Thracian, who lived in ancient times in the Bulgarian lands, rises 3.5 meters in the center of the entrance hall and weighs an impressive 1000 kilograms. It is the work of the prominent sculptor Krum Damyanov and in a short time it became a favorite place for photos of all guests of the capital.

== Gallery ==
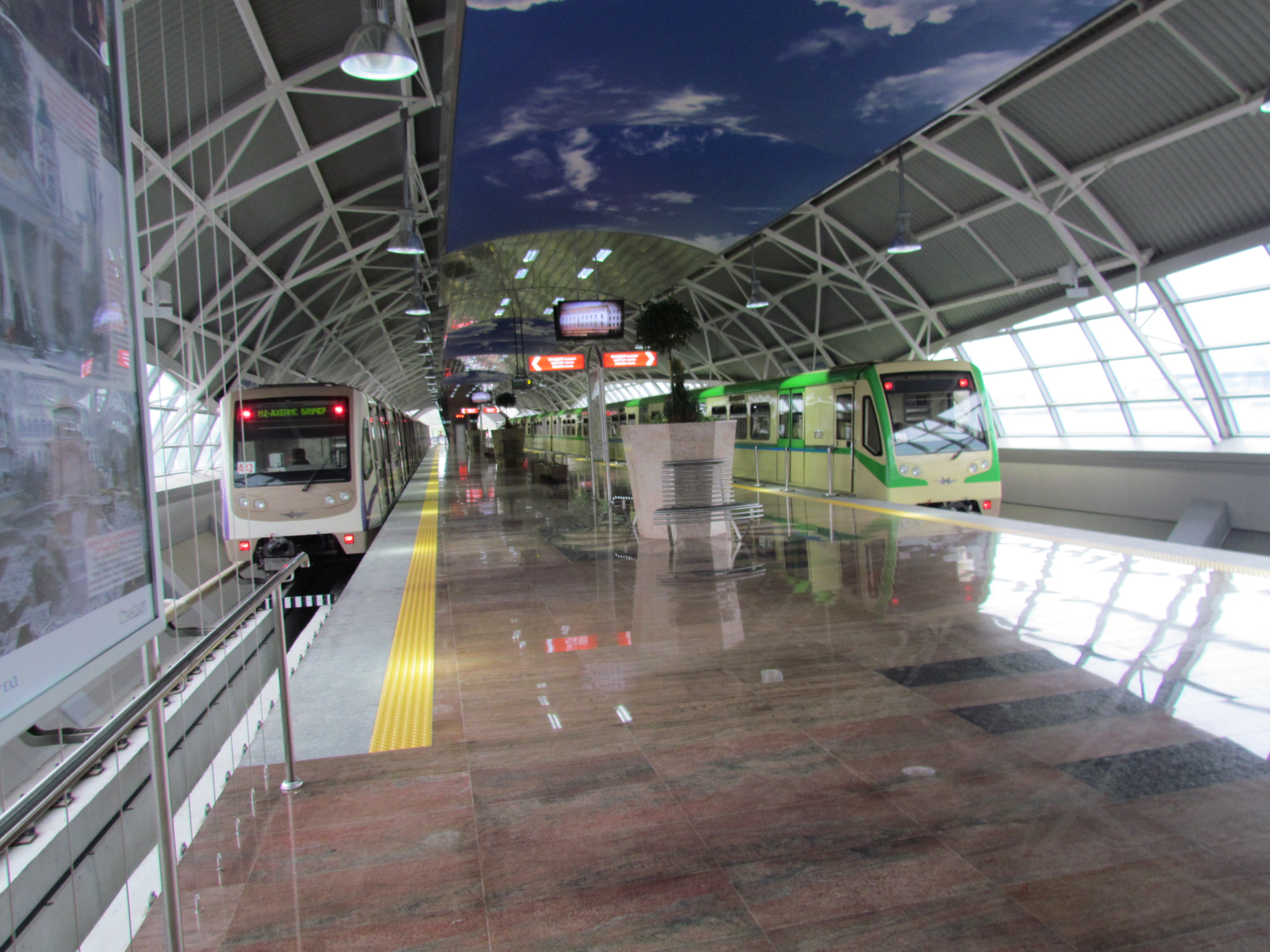

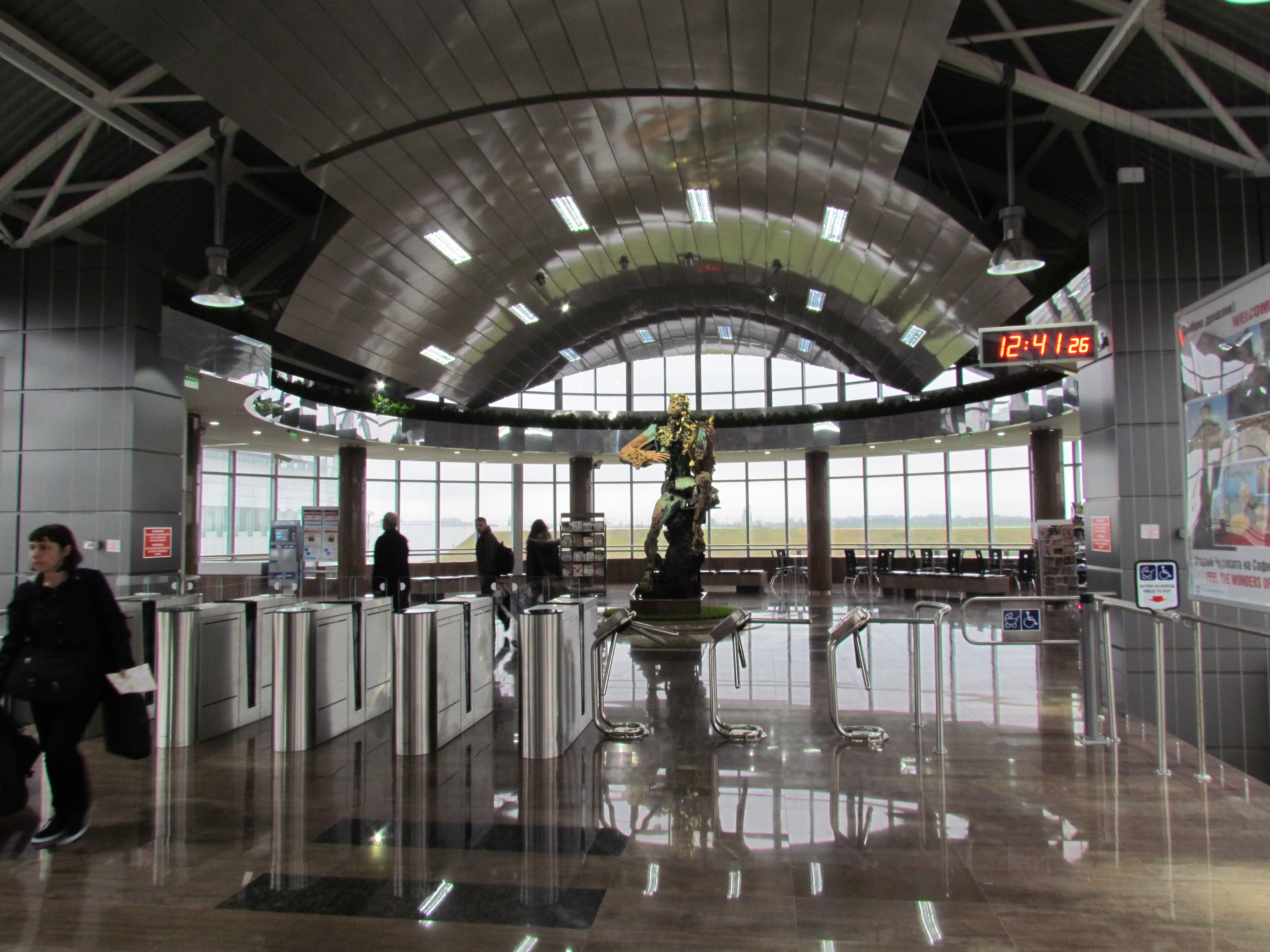

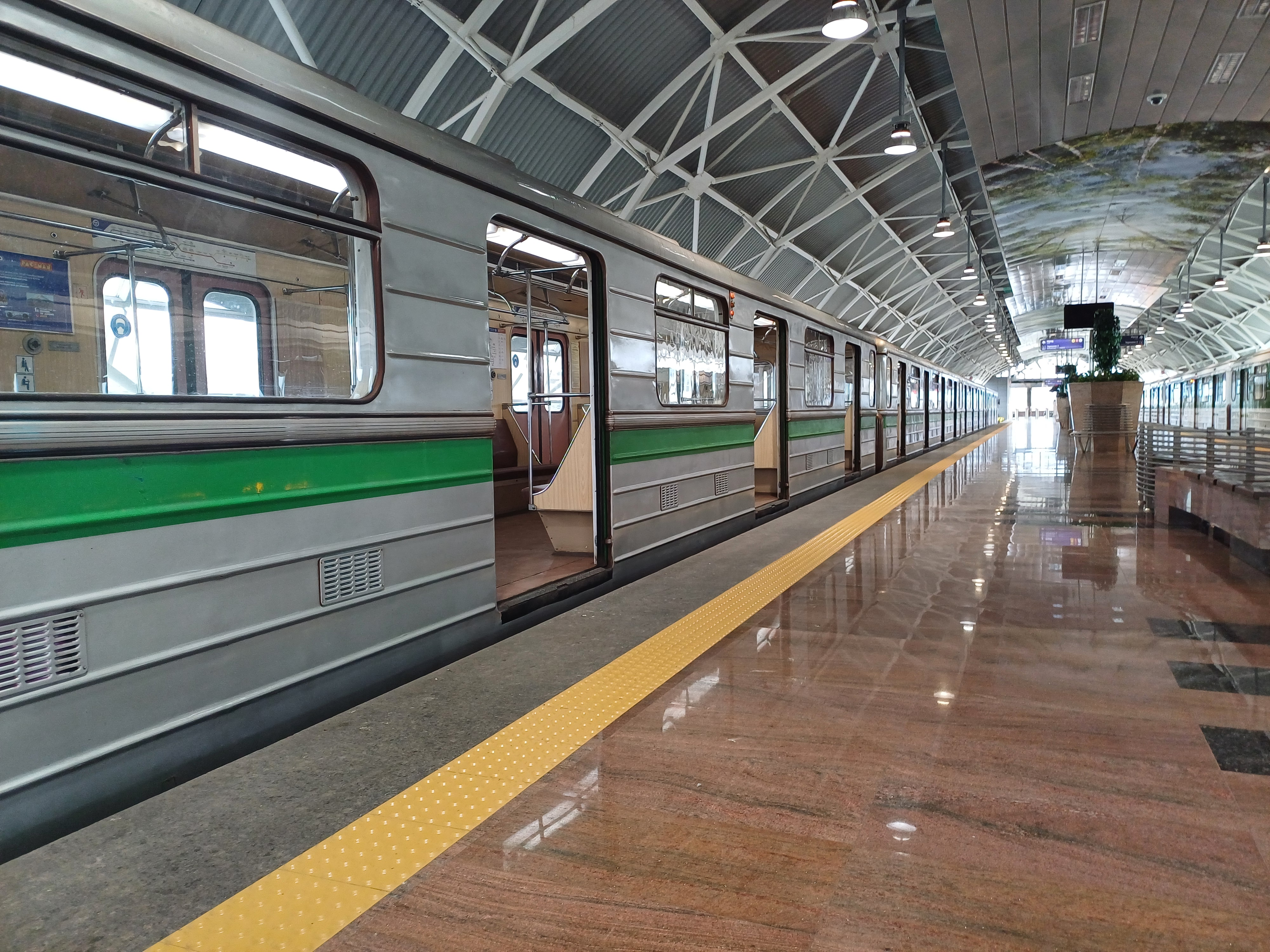

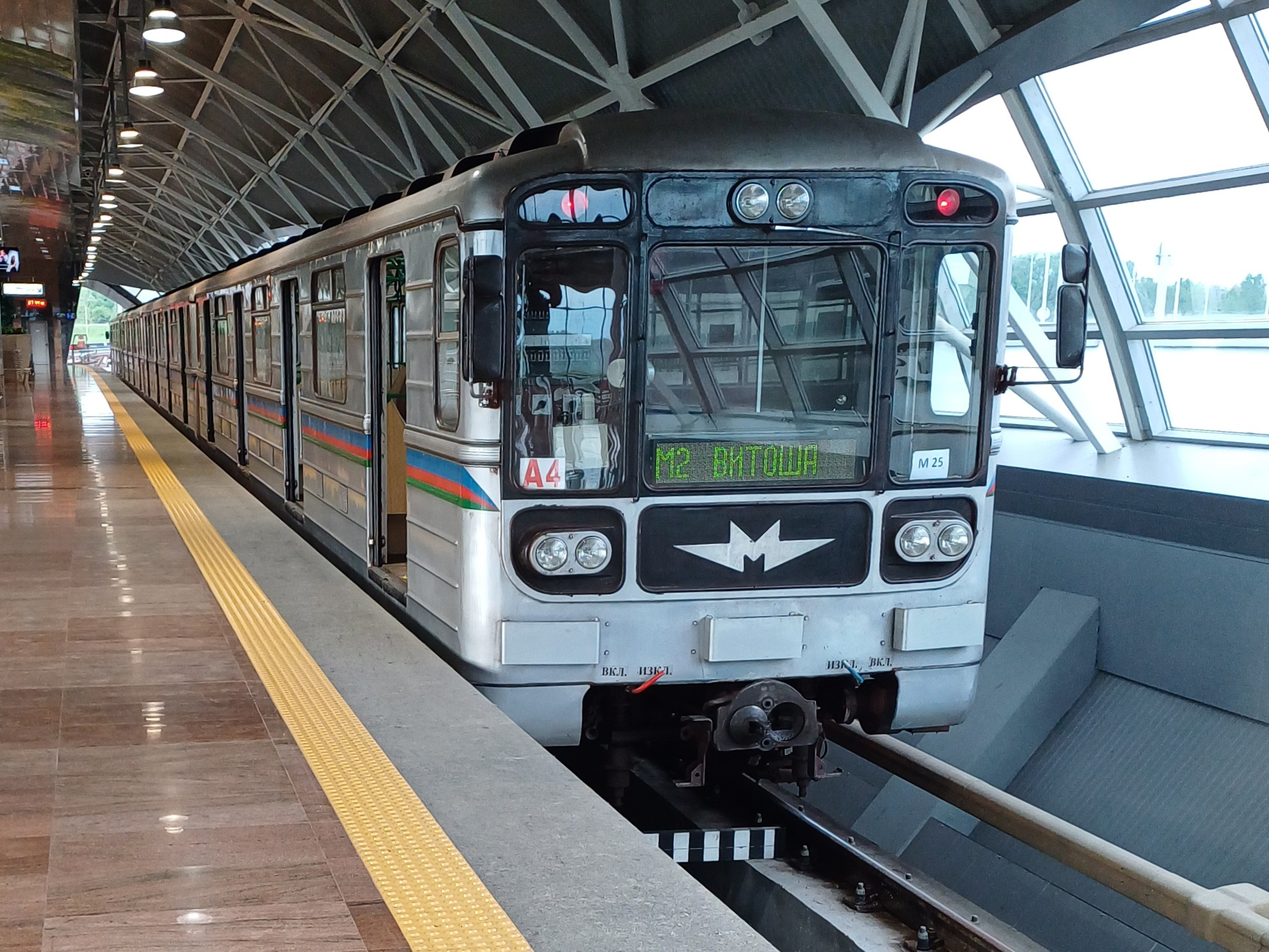
