= List of the busiest airports in Europe =

EU and non-EU airports ranked by passenger numbers served per year

London Heathrow Airport Terminal 5 serving London, United Kingdom, the busiest airport in Europe in 2025

This is a list of the 100 busiest airports in Europe, ranked by total passengers per year, including both terminal and transit passengers. Figures are usually updated in January or February as statistics for the previous year are released. This data is sourced individually for each airport, from a variety of sources, but normally from the relevant national aviation authority, or directly from the airport operator.

The tables also show the percentage change in total passengers for each airport over the last year. Lists of the rankings for every year since 2010 are also presented.

2020 and 2021 numbers were significantly reduced compared to 2019 due to the COVID-19 pandemic, which caused significant reductions in passenger numbers and aircraft movements.

As of 2024, among the top 100 airports 13 were located in Italy, 12 in the United Kingdom, ten in France, nine in Spain (excluding the Canary Islands), eight in Germany and Russia (European part), five in Greece and Poland, three in Switzerland and Portugal, while Belgium, Netherlands, Norway, and Sweden had two airports each.

== 2025 ==
Rank 2025	Rank change 2024–25	Country	Airport	City served	Passengers		Change 2024–25	
Rank 2025	Rank change 2024–25	Country	Airport	City served	2025	2024	%	Numbers
1	Steady	United Kingdom	Heathrow Airport	London	84,482,126	83,884,572	▲0.7%	597,554
2	Steady	Turkey	Istanbul Airport	Istanbul	84,437,710	80,073,252	▲5.5%	4,364,458
3	Steady	France	Charles de Gaulle Airport	Paris	72,029,407	70,290,260	▲2.5%	1,739,147
4	Steady	Netherlands	Amsterdam Airport Schiphol	Amsterdam	68,771,592	66,828,759	▲2.9%	1,942,833
5	Steady	Spain	Madrid–Barajas Airport	Madrid	68,118,754	66,148,340	▲3.0%	1,970,414
6	Steady	Germany	Frankfurt am Main Airport	Frankfurt	63,189,666	61,564,957	▲2.6%	1,624,709
7	Steady	Spain	Barcelona–El Prat Airport	Barcelona	57,483,036	55,034,955	▲4.4%	2,448,081
8	Steady	Italy	Rome Fiumicino Airport	Rome	51,306,744	49,203,734	▲4.3%	2,103,010
9	Steady	Russia	Sheremetyevo International Airport	Moscow	43,400,000	43,711,773	▼0.7%	311,773
10	▲1	Germany	Munich Airport	Munich	43,394,442	41,568,219	▲4.4%	1,826,223
11	▼1	United Kingdom	Gatwick Airport	London	42,775,241	43,249,282	▼1.1%	474,041
12	▲1	Ireland	Dublin Airport	Dublin	36,420,915	34,645,335	▲5.2%	1,786,908
13	▼1	Portugal	Lisbon Airport	Lisbon	36,126,000	35,093,000	▲3.4%	1,033,000
14	▲1	France	Orly Airport	Paris	34,927,304	33,122,144	▲5.5%	1,805,160
15	▲1	Greece	Athens International Airport	Athens	33,993,746	31,854,761	▲6.7%	2,138,985
16	▼2	Spain	Palma de Mallorca Airport	Palma de Mallorca	33,806,427	33,298,164	▲1.5%	508,263
17	▲1	Switzerland	Zurich Airport	Zürich	32,593,966	31,204,287	▲4.5%	1,389,679
18	▼1	Austria	Vienna Airport	Vienna	32,559,115	31,719,836	▲2.7%	839,279
19	▲1	Denmark	Copenhagen Airport	Copenhagen	32,433,694	29,882,553	▲8.5%	2,550,447
20	▼1	United Kingdom	Manchester Airport	Manchester	32,072,136	30,789,056	▲4.2%	1,283,080
21	▲1	Italy	Malpensa Airport	Milan	31,385,585	28,910,368	▲8,6%	2,323,861
22	▼1	United Kingdom	Stansted Airport	London	29,758,490	29,694,316	▲0.2%	64,174
23	Steady	Norway	Oslo Airport, Gardermoen	Oslo	27,072,860	26,438,238	▲2.4%	634,622
24	▲1	Spain	Málaga Airport	Málaga	26,760,549	24,923,774	▲7.4%	1,836,775
25	▼1	Germany	Berlin Brandenburg Airport	Berlin	26,050,740	25,465,872	▲2.3%	584,868
26	Steady	Belgium	Brussels Airport	Brussels	24,383,115	23,610,856	▲3.3%	772,259
27	Steady	Sweden	Stockholm Arlanda Airport	Stockholm	24,294,277	22,737,974	▲6.8%	1,556,303
28	Steady	Poland	Warsaw Chopin Airport	Warsaw	24,097,059	21,283,397	▲13.2%	2,813,662
29	▲1	Germany	Düsseldorf Airport	Düsseldorf	21,000,000	20,040,193	▲4.9%	959,807
30	▼1	Russia	Pulkovo Airport	Saint Petersburg	20,700,000	20,900,000	▼1.0%	200,000
31	Steady	Spain	Alicante–Elche Airport	Alicante/Elche	19,950,394	18,387,387	▲8.5%	1,563,007
32	▲1	Hungary	Budapest Airport	Budapest	19,584,000	17,526,000	▲11.7%	2,058,000
33	▼1	Switzerland	Geneva Airport	Geneva	17,848,371	17,796,333	▲0.3%	52,038
34	▲1	United Kingdom	Luton Airport	London	17,770,247	16,939,902	▲4.9%	830,345
35	▲1	Czech Republic	Václav Havel Airport Prague	Prague	17,750,528	16,353,522	▲8.5%	1,397,006
36	▲3	Romania	Henri Coandă International Airport	Bucharest	17,005,524	15,946,791	▲6.6%	1,058,733
37	▲4	United Kingdom	Edinburgh Airport	Edinburgh	16,970,685	15,780,353	▲7.5%	1,190,332
38	▼2	Finland	Helsinki Airport	Helsinki	16,980,287	16,308,814	▲4.1%	671,473
39	▲1	Portugal	Porto Airport	Porto	16,939,000	15,930,000	▲6.3%	1,009,000
40	▼4	Italy	Milan Bergamo Airport	Milan/Bergamo	16,937,976	17,353,573	▼2.4%	415,597
41	▼3	Russia	Vnukovo International Airport	Moscow	16,300,000	16,000,000	▲1.9%	300,000
42	▲2	France	Nice Côte d'Azur Airport	Nice	15,226,077	14,759,976	▲3.2%	466,101
43	Steady	Germany	Hamburg Airport	Hamburg	14,800,000	14,830,000	▼0.2%	30,000
44	▼3	Russia	Moscow Domodedovo Airport	Moscow	13,860,000	15,600,000	▼11.2%	1,740,000
45	Steady	United Kingdom	Birmingham Airport	Birmingham	13,663,877	12,848,201	▲6.3%	815,676
46	Steady	Italy	Naples-Capodichino International Airport	Naples	13,271,094	12,650,478	▲4.9%	620,616
47	▲3	Poland	Kraków John Paul II International Airport	Kraków	13,248,355	11,080,830	▲19.6%	2,167,525
48	▼1	Italy	Catania-Fontanarossa Airport	Catania	12,369,485	12,346,530	▲0.2%	22,955
49	▼1	Italy	Venice Marco Polo Airport	Venice	11,850,336	11,590,356	2.2%	259,980
50	▲1	Spain	Valencia Airport	Valencia	11,847,527	10,811,672	▲9.6%	1,035,855
51	▲2	Albania	Tirana Airport	Tirana	11,640,044	10,709,253	▲8.7%	▲930,791
52	▲3	Belgium	Brussels Charleroi Airport	Charleroi	11,545,067	10,504,554	9.9%	1,040,513
53	▼4	France	Marseille Provence Airport	Marseille	11,258,580	11,157,419	▲1.0%	101,161
54	▼2	Italy	Bologna Guglielmo Marconi Airport	Bologna	11,138,013	10,775,972	▲3.4%	382,041
55	▼1	Italy	Linate Airport	Milan	11,131,764	10,650,990	4.5%	480,774
56	▼1	United Kingdom	Bristol Airport	Bristol	10,833,730	10,615,864	2.1%	217,866
57	Steady	France	Lyon–Saint-Exupéry Airport	Lyon	10,666,333	10,425,012	▲2.3%	241,321
58	▲1	Portugal	Faro Airport	Faro	10,395,000	9,830,000	TBU	TBU
59	▼1	Germany	Cologne Bonn Airport	Cologne/Bonn	10,100,000	10,012,447	▲0.9%	87,553
60	▲4	Malta	Malta International Airport	Malta	10,061,969	8,957,451	▲12.3%	1,104,518
61	▼1	Greece	Heraklion International Airport	Heraklion	10,033,151	9,384,233	▲6.9%	648,918
62	▼1	Spain	Seville Airport	Seville	9,686,487	9,175,072	▲5.6%	511,415
63	▲3	France; Switzerland_{3}	EuroAirport Basel Mulhouse Freiburg	Basel / Mulhouse / Freiburg	9,621,959	8,906,896	▲8.0%	715,063
64	▼1	Germany	Stuttgart Airport	Stuttgart	9,569,617	9,152,709	▲4.6%	416,908
65	▼2	Spain	Ibiza Airport	Ibiza	9,138,224	9,069,410	▲0.8%	68,814
66	▼1	Italy	Falcone–Borsellino Airport	Palermo	9,118,922	8,921,833	▲3.4%	197,089
67	Steady	Serbia	Belgrade Airport	Belgrade	8,911,987	8,367,931	▲6.5%	544,000
68	▲3	Bulgaria	Vasil Levski Sofia Airport	Sofia	8,413,762	7,922,702	▲6.2%	491,060
69	Steady	United Kingdom	Glasgow Airport	Glasgow	8,207,395	8,067,685	▲1.7%	139,710
70	▼1	Iceland	Keflavík Airport	Reykjavík	8,159,461	8,326,972	▼2.0%	167,511
71	▲1	Greece	Thessaloniki Airport	Thessaloniki	7,982,798	7,381,064	▲8.2%	601,734
72	▲1	Italy	Bari Airport	Bari	7,977,881	7,273,141	9.7%	704,740
73	▼2	France	Toulouse–Blagnac Airport	Toulouse	7,630,871	7,853,802	▼2.8%	222,931
74	▲6	Poland	Gdańsk Lech Wałęsa Airport	Gdańsk	7,393,016	6,714,149	▲10.1%	▲678,867
75	▲9	Poland	Katowice Airport	Katowice	7,299,085	6,386,145	▲14,3%	912,940
76	▼1	France	Nantes Atlantique Airport	Nantes	7,182,046	7,000,403	▲2.6%	181,643
77	▼2	Latvia	Riga International Airport	Riga	7,111,000	7,120,000	▼0.1%	9,000
78	▼1	Greece	Rhodes Airport	Rhodes	7,093,264	6,921,748	▲2.5%	171,516
79	Steady	Spain	Bilbao Airport	Bilbao	7,062,681	6,777,267	▲4.2%	285,414
80	▼2	Netherlands	Eindhoven Airport	Eindhoven	6,956,486	6,798,982	▲2.3%	157,504
81	▼2	United Kingdom	Belfast International Airport	Belfast	6,750,440	6,677,021	▼1.1%	73,419
82	▼1	Norway	Bergen Airport, Flesland	Bergen	6,704,306	6,552,286	▲2.3%	152,020
83	Steady	France	Beauvais–Tillé Airport	Paris	6,676,328	6,555,859	▲1.8%	120,469
84	New entry	Moldova	Chișinău Eugen Doga International Airport	Chișinău	6,080,431	4,142,418	▲46.8%	1,938,013
85	▼1	Italy	Pisa International Airport	Pisa	5,964,000	5,547,008	▲7.8%	416,992
86	▼5	France	Bordeaux–Mérignac Airport	Bordeaux	5,873,275	6,592,785	▼10.9%	719,510
87	▲6	United Kingdom	Liverpool John Lennon Airport	Liverpool	5,611,423	5,074,266	▲10.6%	537,157
88	▲4	United Kingdom	Newcastle Airport	Newcastle upon Tyne	5,480,401	5,143,412	▲6.6%	336,989
89	▼1	Sweden	Göteborg Landvetter Airport	Gothenburg	5,434,878	5,336,985	▲1.8%	97,893
90	▼3	Russia	Ğabdulla Tuqay Kazan International Airport	Kazan	5,380,000	5,369,000	▲0.2%	11,000
91	▼2	Germany	Hannover Airport	Hannover	-	5,223,745	TBU	TBU
92	▼1	Luxembourg	Luxembourg Airport	Luxembourg City	5,361,456	5,209,656	▲2.9%	151,800
93	▼1	Italy	Cagliari Elmas Airport	Cagliari	5,245,912	5,161,212	▲1.6%	84,700
94	▲2	Lithuania	Vilnius Čiurlionis International Airport	Vilnius	5,113,452	4,803,725	▲6.4%	309,727
95	▲3	Italy	Turin Airport	Turin	5,006,169	4,693,977	▲6.7%	312,192
96	Steady	Russia	Khrabrovo Airport	Kaliningrad	5,000,000	4,814,395	▼4.1%	185,605
97	▲1	Russia	Mustai Karim Ufa International Airport	Ufa	4,929,715	4,700,000	▲4.9%	229,715
98	▲2	Poland	Nicolaus Copernicus Wrocław Airport	Wrocław	4,907,527	4,473,945	▲9.7%	433,582
99	New entry	Croatia	Zagreb Airport	Zagreb	4,721,563	4,316,619	▲9.3%	▲404,944
100	Steady	Greece	Corfu International Airport "Ioannis Kapodistrias"	Corfu	4,618,810	4,343,748	▲6.3%	275,062

== 2024 ==
Rank 2024	Rank change 2023–24	Country	Airport	City served	Passengers		Change 2023–24	
Rank 2024	Rank change 2023–24	Country	Airport	City served	2024	2023	%	Numbers
1	Steady	United Kingdom	Heathrow Airport	London	83,884,572	79,183,364	▲5.9	4,701,208
2	Steady	Turkey	Istanbul Airport	Istanbul	80,073,252	76,027,321	▲5.3	4,045,931
3	Steady	France	Charles de Gaulle Airport	Paris	70,290,260	67,421,316	▲4.3	2,868,944
4	Steady	Netherlands	Amsterdam Airport Schiphol	Amsterdam	66,828,759	61,889,586	▲8.0	4,939,173
5	Steady	Spain	Adolfo Suárez Madrid–Barajas Airport	Madrid	66,148,340	60,181,604	▲9.9	5,966,736
6	Steady	Germany	Frankfurt am Main Airport	Frankfurt	61,564,957	59,359,539	▲3.7	2,205,418
7	Steady	Spain	Josep Tarradellas Barcelona–El Prat Airport	Barcelona	55,037,892	49,909,544	▲10.3	5,128,348
8	▲1	Italy	Rome Fiumicino Airport	Rome	49,203,734	40,545,240	▲21.4	8,658,494
9	▲2	Russia	Sheremetyevo International Airport	Moscow	43,711,773	36,600,000	▲19.4	7,111,773
10	▼2	United Kingdom	Gatwick Airport	London	43,249,282	40,897,656	▲5.8	2,351,626
11	▼1	Germany	Munich Airport	Munich	41,578,644	37,037,070	▲12.2	4,541,574
12	Steady	Portugal	Lisbon Airport	Lisbon	35,093,000	33,649,000	▲4.3	1,444,000
13	Steady	Ireland	Dublin Airport	Dublin	34,645,335	33,522,493	▲3.3	1,077,507
14	▲1	Spain	Palma de Mallorca Airport	Palma de Mallorca	33,298,379	31,105,987	▲7.0	2,192,392
15	▼1	France	Orly Airport	Paris	33,122,144	32,294,167	▲2.6	827,977
16	▲2	Greece	Athens International Airport	Athens	31,854,761	28,174,150	▲13.1	3,680,516
17	▼1	Austria	Vienna Airport	Vienna	31,719,836	29,533,186	▲7,4	2,186,650
18	▼1	Switzerland	Zurich Airport	Zürich	31,204,287	28,885,506	▲8.0	2,314,781
19	Steady	United Kingdom	Manchester Airport	Manchester	30,789,056	28,096,783	▲9.6	2,692,273
20	▲1	Denmark	Copenhagen Airport	Copenhagen	29,882,553	26,765,393	▲11.6	3,117,160
21	▼1	United Kingdom	Stansted Airport	London	29,694,316	27,951,291	▲6.2	1,743,025
22	Steady	Italy	Malpensa Airport	Milan	28,910,368	26,076,714	▲10.9	2,833,654
23	Steady	Norway	Oslo Airport, Gardermoen	Oslo	26,438,238	25,147,914	▲5.0	1,290,324
24	Steady	Germany	Berlin Brandenburg Airport	Berlin	25,465,872	23,071,865	▲10.4	2,394,007
25	Steady	Spain	Málaga Airport	Málaga	24,924,219	22,344,373	▲11.5	2,579,846
26	Steady	Belgium	Brussels Airport	Brussels	23,610,856	22,200,755	▲6.4	1,410,101
27	Steady	Sweden	Stockholm Arlanda Airport	Stockholm	22,737,974	21,818,580	▲4.2	919,394
28	▲3	Poland	Warsaw Chopin Airport	Warsaw	21,283,397	18,499,527	▲15	2,783,870
29	▼1	Russia	Pulkovo Airport	Saint Petersburg	20,900,000	20,400,000>	▲2.5	500,000
30	Steady	Germany	Düsseldorf Airport	Düsseldorf	20,040,193	19,118,928	▲4.8	921,265
31	▲4	Spain	Alicante–Elche Miguel Hernández Airport	Alicante/Elche	18,388,543	15,747,678	▲16.8	2,640,865
32	Steady	Switzerland	Geneva Airport	Geneva	17,796,333	16,482,740	▲8.0	1,313,593
33	▲5	Hungary	Budapest Airport	Budapest	17,526,000	14,701,080	▲19.0	2,824,920
34	Steady	Italy	Milan Bergamo Airport	Milan/Bergamo	17,353,573	15,974,451	▲8.6	1,379,122
35	▼2	United Kingdom	Luton Airport	London	16,939,902	16,403,784	▲3.3	536,118
36	▲7	Czech Republic	Václav Havel Airport Prague	Prague	16,353,522	13,823,137	▲18	2,530,385
37	▼1	Finland	Helsinki Airport	Helsinki	16,308,814	15,313,355	▲6.5	995,459
38	▲2	Russia	Vnukovo International Airport	Moscow	16,000,000	14,500,000	▲10.3	1,500,000
39	Steady	Romania	Henri Coandă International Airport	Bucharest	15,946,791	14,630,715	▲9,0	1,316,076
40	▼3	Portugal	Porto Airport	Porto	15,930,000	15,205,000	▲4.8	725,000
41	Steady	United Kingdom	Edinburgh Airport	Edinburgh	15,780,353	14,396,794	▲9.6	1,383,559
42	▼13	Russia	Moscow Domodedovo Airport	Moscow	15,600,000	19,900,000	▼21.6	4,300,000
43	▲1	Germany	Hamburg Airport	Hamburg	14,830,000	13,559,912	▲9.4	1,270,088
44	▼2	France	Nice Côte d'Azur Airport	Nice	14,759,976	14,189,965	▲4.0	570,011
45	▲1	United Kingdom	Birmingham Airport	Birmingham	12,848,201	11,481,365	▲11.9	1,366,836
46	▼1	Italy	Naples Airport	Naples	12,650,478	12,394,911	▲2.1	255,567
47	▲2	Italy	Catania-Fontanarossa Airport	Catania	12,346,530	10,739,614	▲15	1,606,916
48	▼1	Italy	Venice Marco Polo Airport	Venice	11,590,356	11,326,212	▲2.3	264,144
49	▼1	France	Marseille Provence Airport	Marseille	11,157,419	10,800,254	▲3.0	357,165
50	▲7	Poland	Kraków John Paul II International Airport	Kraków	11,080,830	9,404,611	▲17.8	1,676,219
51	▲1	Spain	Valencia Airport	Valencia	10,811,963	9,948,141	▲8.7	863,822
52	▼1	Italy	Bologna Airport	Bologna	10,775,972	9,970,284	▲8.1	805,688
53	▲16	Albania	Tirana Airport	Tirana	10,709,253	7,257,634	▲47.6	3,451,619
54	▲2	Italy	Linate Airport	Milan	10,650,990	9,426,784	▲13	1,224,206
55	▼2	United Kingdom	Bristol Airport	Bristol	10,615,864	9,913,011	▲7.1	702,853
56	▲2	Belgium	Brussels South Charleroi Airport	Charleroi	10,504,554	9,399,011	▲11.75	1,105,543
57	▼7	France	Lyon–Saint-Exupéry Airport	Lyon	10,425,012	9,989,867	▲4.6	435,145
58	▼4	Germany	Cologne Bonn Airport	Cologne/Bonn	10,012,447	9,763,127	▲2.6	249,320
59	▼4	Portugal	Faro Airport	Faro	9,830,000	9,640,000	▲2.0	190,000
60	Steady	Greece	Heraklion International Airport	Heraklion	9,384,233	8,723,031	▲7.6	661,202
61	▲3	Spain	Seville Airport	Seville	9,175,759	8,071,524	▲13.7	1,104,235
62	▲	Germany	Stuttgart Airport	Stuttgart	9,152,709	8,447,406	▲8.5	705,303
63	▼3	Spain	Ibiza Airport	Ibiza	9,073,223	8,931,598	▲1.6	141,625
64	▲4	Malta	Malta International Airport	Malta	8,957,451	7,803,042	▲14.8	1,154,409
65	▼1	Italy	Falcone–Borsellino Airport	Palermo	8,921,833	8,103,204	▲10.1	818,629
66	▼	France; Switzerland_{3}	EuroAirport Basel Mulhouse Freiburg	Basel/Mulhouse/ Freiburg im Breisgau	8,906,896	8,087,099	▲10.2	819,797
67	▼3	Serbia	Belgrade Nikola Tesla Airport	Belgrade	8,367,931	7,948,202	▲5.3	421,217
68	Steady	IcelandIceland	Keflavík Airport	Reykjavík	8,326,970	7,775,429	▲7.1	551,541
69	▲2	United Kingdom	Glasgow Airport	Glasgow	8,067,685	7,358,828	▲9.6	708,857
70	Steady	Bulgaria	Sofia Airport	Sofia	7,922,702	7,208,987	▲9.9	713,715
71	▼5	France	Toulouse–Blagnac Airport	Toulouse	7,853,802	7,804,980	▲0.6	48,822
72	Steady	Greece	Thessaloniki Airport	Thessaloniki	7,381,064	7,029,957	▲5.0	351,107
73	▲4	Italy	Bari Airport	Bari	7,273,141	6,474,463	▲12.3	798,678
74	Steady	Latvia	Riga International Airport	Riga	7,120,000	6,630,891	▲7.4	489,109
75	▲	France	Nantes Atlantique Airport	Nantes	7,000,403	6,535,074	▲7.3	465,329
76	▲3	Greece	Rhodes Airport	Rhodes	6,921,748	6,142,813	▲12.7	778,750
77	▼5	Netherlands	Eindhoven Airport	Eindhoven	6,798,982	6,876,917	▼1.1	▼77,935
78	Steady	Spain	Bilbao Airport	Bilbao	6,777,645	6,336,441	▲7.0	441,204
79	▲1	United Kingdom	Belfast International Airport	Belfast	6,750,440	5,957,055	▲13.3	793,385
80	▲1	Poland	Gdańsk Lech Wałęsa Airport	Gdańsk	6,714,149	5,907,280	▲13.7	806,869
81	Steady	France	Bordeaux–Mérignac Airport	Bordeaux	6,592,785	6,584,194	▲0.1	8,591
82	▼	France	Beauvais–Tillé Airport	Paris	6,555,859	5,638,955	▲16.3	916,904
83	▼4	Norway	Bergen Airport, Flesland	Bergen	6,552,286	6,405,239	▲2.3	147,237
84	Steady	Poland	Katowice Airport	Katowice	6,386,145	5,609,022	▲13.9	777,123
85	▲2	Italy	Pisa International Airport	Pisa	5,547,008	5,109,682	▲8.6	437,326
86	Steady	Russia	Ğabdulla Tuqay Kazan International Airport	Kazan	5,369,000	5,168,000	▲3,9	201,000
87	▼2	Sweden	Göteborg Landvetter Airport	Gothenburg	5,336,985	5,184,645	▲2.9	152,340
88	▲6	Germany	Hannover Airport	Hannover	5,223,745	5,330,308	▲13.6	623,922
89	▲6	Armenia	Zvartnots International Airport	Yerevan	5,248,348	4,599,823	▼1.6	81,960
90	▼1	Luxembourg	Luxembourg Airport	Luxembourg City	5,209,656	4,856,932	▲7.3	352,724
91	▼2	Italy	Cagliari Elmas Airport	Cagliari	5,161,212	4,853,113	▲6.3	308,099
92	Steady	United Kingdom	Newcastle Airport	Newcastle upon Tyne	5,143,412	4,819,969	▲6.7	323,443
93	▲6	United Kingdom	Liverpool John Lennon Airport	Liverpool	5,074,266	4,193,623	▲21.0	880,643
94	▼1	Russia	Mineralnye Vody Airport (Note: Depending on the boundary between the continents, the airport can be considered as located in Asia)	Mineralnye Vody	4,861,647	4,789,000	▲1.5	72,411
95	▲2	Russia	Khrabrovo Airport	Kaliningrad	4,814,395	4,300,625	▲12.0	513,770
96	Steady	Lithuania	Vilnius Airport	Vilnius	4,803,725	4,406,019	▲9.0	397,702
97	▼5	Russia	Mustai Karim Ufa International Airport	Ufa	4,700,000	4,794,786	▼0.9	100,000
98	▼4	Italy	Turin Airport	Turin	4,693,977	4,531,187	▲3.6	162,790
99	New entry	Poland	Wrocław Airport	Wrocław	4,473,945	3,891,553	▲15.0	582,392
100	▼1	Greece	Corfu Airport	Corfu	4,343,748	4,068,053	▲6.8	275,695

== 2023 ==
Rank 2023	Rank change 2022–2023	Country	Airport	City served	Passengers		Change Δ 2023/2022	
Rank 2023	Rank change 2022–2023	Country	Airport	City served	2023	2022	%	People
1	▲1	United Kingdom	Heathrow Airport	London	79,151,723	61,611,838	▲28.5	17,539,885
2	▼1	Turkey	Istanbul Airport	Istanbul	76,011,907	64,518,073	▲17.8	11,493,834
3	Steady	France	Charles de Gaulle Airport	Paris	67,421,316	57,474,033	▲17.3	9,947,283
4	Steady	Netherlands	Amsterdam Airport Schiphol	Amsterdam	61,889,586	52,472,188	▲17.9	9,417,398
5	Steady	Spain	Adolfo Suárez Madrid–Barajas Airport	Madrid	60,220,984	50,633,759	▲18.9	9,587,225
6	Steady	Germany	Frankfurt am Main Airport	Frankfurt	59,359,539	48,923,474	▲21.3	10,436,065
7	Steady	Spain	Josep Tarradellas Barcelona–El Prat Airport	Barcelona	49,909,544	41,641,444	▲19.9	8,268,100
8	Steady	United Kingdom	Gatwick Airport	London	40,899,000	32,835,381	▲24.5	8,062,275
9	▲1	Italy	Rome Fiumicino Airport	Rome	40,545,240	29,360,613	▲38.1	11,184,627
10	▼1	Germany	Munich Airport	Munich	37,037,070	31,642,702	▲17.0	5,394,368
11	▲2	Russia	Sheremetyevo International Airport	Moscow	36,600,000	28,422,391	▲28.8	8,177,609
12	▲2	Portugal	Lisbon Airport	Lisbon	33,649,000	28,261,883	▲19.1	5,387,117
13	▲2	Ireland	Dublin Airport	Dublin	33,522,493	28,085,562	▲19.4	5,436,931
14	▼3	France	Orly Airport	Paris	32,294,167	29,187,269	▲10.6	3,106,898
15	▼3	Spain	Palma de Mallorca Airport	Palma de Mallorca	31,105,987	28,573,350	▲8.9	2,532,637
16	Steady	Austria	Vienna International Airport	Vienna	29,533,186	23,682,133	▲24.7	5,851,053
17	▲3	Switzerland	Zurich Airport	Zürich	28,885,506	22,561,132	▲28.0	6,324,374
18	▲1	Greece	Athens International Airport	Athens	28,174,150	22,728,668	▲24.0	5,445,482
19	▼2	United Kingdom	Manchester Airport	Manchester	28,108,238	23,369,770	▲20.3	4,738,468
20	▼2	United Kingdom	Stansted Airport	London	27,965,262	23,319,523	▲20.0	4,645,739
21	▲1	Denmark	Copenhagen Airport	Copenhagen	26,765,393	22,143,135	▲20.9	4,622,258
22	▲1	Italy	Malpensa Airport	Milan	26,076,714	21,347,652	▲22.1	4,729,062
23	▼2	Norway	Oslo Airport, Gardermoen	Oslo	25,147,914	22,467,510	▲11.9	2,680,404
24	▲1	Germany	Berlin Brandenburg Airport	Berlin	23,071,865	19,846,114	▲16.3	3,225,751
25	▲2	Spain	Málaga Airport	Málaga	22,344,373	18,458,006	▲21.1	3,886,367
26	Steady	Belgium	Brussels Airport	Brussels	22,200,755	18,930,698	▲17.3	3,270,057
27	▲1	Sweden	Stockholm Arlanda Airport	Stockholm	21,818,580	18,427,286	▲18.4	3,391,294
28	▲1	Russia	Pulkovo Airport	Saint Petersburg	20,400,000	18,140,100	▲12.5	2,259,900
29	▼5	Russia	Domodedovo International Airport	Moscow	19,900,000	21,205,549	▼6.2	1,305,549
30	▲1	Germany	Düsseldorf Airport	Düsseldorf	19,118,928	16,071,936	▲19.0	3,046,992
31	▲1	Poland	Warsaw Chopin Airport	Warsaw	18,499,527	14,413,889	▲28.3	4,085,638
32	▲1	Switzerland	Geneva Airport	Geneva	16,482,740	14,085,282	▲17.0	2,397,458
33	▲1	United Kingdom	Luton Airport	London	16,195,068	13,324,491	▲21.5	2,870,577
34	▲2	Italy	Orio al Serio International Airport	Milan/Bergamo	15,974,451	13,155,806	▲21.4	2,818,645
35	Steady	Spain	Alicante–Elche Miguel Hernández Airport	Alicante/Elche	15,747,678	13,206,430	▲19.2	2,541,248
36	▲1	Finland	Helsinki Airport	Helsinki	15,313,355	12,882,861	▲18.9	2,430,494
37	▲1	Portugal	Porto Airport	Porto	15,205,000	12,637,645	▲20.3	2,567,355
38	▲2	Hungary	Budapest Ferenc Liszt International Airport	Budapest	14,701,080	12,205,070	▲20.5	2,496,010
39	Steady	Romania	Henri Coandă International Airport	Bucharest	14,630,715	12,601,679	▲16.1	2,029,036
40	▼10	Russia	Vnukovo International Airport	Moscow	14,500,000	16,400,000	▼13.1	1,900,000
41	▲1	United Kingdom	Edinburgh Airport	Edinburgh	14,396,794	11,261,873	▲28	▲3,146,583
42	▼1	France	Nice Côte d'Azur Airport	Nice	14,189,965	12,119,043	▲17.1	2,070,922
43	▲2	Czech Republic	Václav Havel Airport Prague	Prague	13,823,137	10,734,880	▲28.8	3,088,257
44	▼1	Germany	Hamburg Airport	Hamburg	13,559,912	11,096,296	▲22.2	2,463,616
45	▼1	Italy	Naples Airport	Naples	12,394,911	10,918,234	▲13.5	1,476,677
46	▲1	United Kingdom	Birmingham Airport	Birmingham	11,481,465	9,597,485	▲19.3	1,858,817
47	▲2	Italy	Venice Marco Polo Airport	Venice	11,326,212	9,319,156	▲21.5	2,007,056
48	▲1	France	Marseille Provence Airport	Marseille	10,800,254	9,148,306	▲18.1	1,651,948
49	▼3	Italy	Catania-Fontanarossa Airport	Catania	10,739,614	10,099,441	▲6.3	640,173
50	▲1	France	Lyon–Saint-Exupéry Airport	Lyon	9,989,867	8,558,341	▲16.7	1,431,526
51	▲1	Italy	Bologna Guglielmo Marconi Airport	Bologna	9,970,284	8,496,000	▲17.4	1,474,284
52	▲4	Spain	Valencia Airport	Valencia	9,948,141	8,114,821	▲22.6	1,833,320
53	▲5	United Kingdom	Bristol Airport	Bristol	9,913,011	7,948,941	▲5.7	1,964,070
54	▼4	Germany	Cologne Bonn Airport	Cologne/Bonn	9,763,127	8,756,712	▲11.5	1,006,415
55	▼1	Portugal	Faro Airport	Faro	9,640,000	8,171,413	▲18.0	1,468,587
56	▲3	Italy	Linate Airport	Milan	9,426,784	7,719,977	▲22.1	1,706,807
57	▲3	Poland	Kraków John Paul II International Airport	Kraków	9,404,611	7,394,176	▲27.2	2,010,435
58	▼5	Belgium	Brussels South Charleroi Airport	Charleroi	9,399,011	8,271,138	▲13.6	1,127,873
59	▼4	Spain	Ibiza Airport	Ibiza	8,931,598	8,156,708	▲9.5	774,890
60	▼3	Greece	Heraklion International Airport	Heraklion	8,723,031	8,099,255	▲7.7	623,776
61	▲3	Germany	Stuttgart Airport	Stuttgart	8,447,406	6,997,032	▲20.7	1,450,374
62	▼1	Italy	Falcone–Borsellino Airport	Palermo	8,103,204	7,117,822	▲13.8	985,382
63	▼1	France; Switzerland_{3}	EuroAirport Basel Mulhouse Freiburg	Basel/Mulhouse/Freiburg im Breisgau	8,087,099	7,050,905	▲14.7	1,036,183
64	▲1	Spain	Seville Airport	Seville	8,071,524	6,779,453	▲19.1	1,292,071
65	▲12	Serbia	Belgrade Nikola Tesla Airport	Belgrade	7,948,202	5,611,729	▲41.6	2,336,473
66	▼3	France	Toulouse–Blagnac Airport	Toulouse	7,804,980	7,037,150	▲10.9	767,830
67	▲5	Malta	Malta International Airport	Malta	7,803,042	5,851,079	▲33.4	1,951,963
68	▲1	Iceland Iceland	Keflavík International Airport	Reykjavík	7,775,429	6,126,421	▲26.9	1,649,008
69	▲10	Albania	Tirana Airport	Tirana	7,257,634	5,198,550	▲39.6	2,059,084
70	Steady	Bulgaria	Sofia Airport	Sofia	7,208,987	6,003,653	▲20.8	1,205,334
71	▼5	United Kingdom	Glasgow Airport	Glasgow	7,358,828	6,517,585	▲12.9	841,243
72	Steady	Greece	Thessaloniki Airport "Macedonia"	Thessaloniki	7,029,957	5,923,175	▲18.7	1,106,782
73	▼6	Netherlands	Eindhoven Airport	Eindhoven	6,876,917	6,330,599	▲8.6	546,318
74	▲2	Latvia	Riga International Airport	Riga	6,630,891	5,380,779	▲23.2	1,250,112
75	▲1	France	Bordeaux–Mérignac Airport	Bordeaux	6,584,194	5,704,455	▲15.4	879,739
76	▼1	France	Nantes Atlantique Airport	Nantes	6,535,074	5,800,372	▲12.7	734,702
77	▼9	Italy	Bari Airport	Bari	6,474,463	6,205,461	▲4.3	269,002
78	▼7	Norway	Bergen Airport, Flesland	Bergen	6,405,239	5,995,234	▲6.8	410,005
79	▲1	Spain	Bilbao Airport	Bilbao	6,336,441	5,129,584	▲23.5	1,206,857
80	▼7	Greece	Rhodes International Airport	Rhodes	6,142,813	5,857,036	▲4.9	285,777
81	Steady	United Kingdom	Belfast International Airport	Belfast	5,957,055	4,818,214	▲23.6	1,138,841
82	▲1	Poland	Gdańsk Lech Wałęsa Airport	Gdańsk	5,907,280	4,576,705	▲29.1	1,330,575
83	▼1	France	Beauvais–Tillé Airport	Paris	5,638,955	4,614,424	▲22.2	1,024,531
84	▲2	Poland	Katowice Airport	Katowice	5,609,022	4,419,090	▲26.9	1,189,932
85	Steady	Sweden	Göteborg Landvetter Airport	Gothenburg	5,184,645	4,445,970	▲16.6	738,675
86	▲7	Russia	Kazan International Airport	Kazan	5,168,000	4,018,000	▲28.6	1,150,000
87	▼3	Italy	Pisa International Airport	Pisa	5,109,682	4,493,847	▲13.7	615,835
88	▲4	Luxembourg	Luxembourg Airport	Luxembourg City	4,856,932	4,053,726	▲19.81	▲803,206
89	▼2	Italy	Cagliari Elmas Airport	Cagliari	4,853,113	4,396,594	▲10.4	456,519
90	▼1	United Kingdom	Newcastle Airport	Newcastle upon Tyne	4,819,969	4,128,047	▲16.8	691,562
91	▼1	Russia	Ufa International Airport	Ufa	4,794,786	4,089,111	▲17.3	705,765
92	▼1	Russia	Mineralnye Vody Airport	Mineralnye Vody	4,789,000	4,086,000	▲17.2	703,000
93	▲1	Germany	Hannover Airport	Hannover	4,599,823	3,961,983	▲16.1	637,840
94	▼6	Italy	Turin Airport	Turin	4,531,187	4,193,881	▲8.0	337,306
95	Steady	Lithuania	Vilnius International Airport	Vilnius	4,406,019	3,915,960	▲12.5	490,059
96	▲3	Russia	Khrabrovo Airport	Kaliningrad	4,300,625	3,742,387	▲14.9	558,238
97	New entry	United Kingdom	Liverpool John Lennon Airport	Liverpool	4,193,623	3,490,844	▲20.1	702,779
98	Steady	Greece	Corfu International Airport	Corfu	4,068,053	3,749,106	▲8.5	318,947
99	▼2	Norway	Trondheim Airport Værnes	Trondheim	4,028,062	3,803,933	▲5.9	224,129
100	Steady	Denmark	Billund Airport	Billund	3,979,320	3,712,400	▲7.2	266,920

== 2022 ==
Rank 2022	Rank change 2021–2022	Country	Airport	City served	Passengers		Change 2021–2022	
Rank 2022	Rank change 2021–2022	Country	Airport	City served	2022	2021	%	Numbers
1	Steady	Turkey	Istanbul Airport	Istanbul	64,518,073	37,181,907	▲73.5	▲27,336,166
2	▲6	United Kingdom	Heathrow Airport	London	61,611,838	19,393,886	▲217.7	▲42,217,952
3	Steady	France	Charles de Gaulle Airport	Paris	57,474,033	26,196,575	▲119.4	▲31,277,458
4	Steady	Netherlands	Amsterdam Airport Schiphol	Amsterdam	52,472,188	25,492,633	▲105.8	▲26,979,555
5	▲2	Spain	Adolfo Suárez Madrid–Barajas Airport	Madrid	50,633,759	24,135,039	▲109.8	▲26,498,720
6	Steady	Germany	Frankfurt am Main Airport	Frankfurt	48,923,474	24,812,849	▲97.2	▲24,110,625
7	▲2	Spain	Josep Tarradellas Barcelona–El Prat Airport	Barcelona	41,641,444	18,875,461	▲120.6	▲22,765,983
8	▲28	United Kingdom	Gatwick Airport	London	32,839,000	6,260,072	▲424.6	▲26,578,928
9	▲5	Germany	Munich Airport	Munich	31,642,738	12,496,432	▲153.2	▲19,146,306
10	▲7	Italy	Leonardo da Vinci–Fiumicino Airport	Rome	29,360,613	11,662,842	▲151.7	▲17,697,771
11	▲1	France	Orly Airport	Paris	29,187,269	15,724,580	▲85.6	▲13,462,689
12	▲1	Spain	Palma de Mallorca Airport	Palma de Mallorca	28,573,350	14,497,159	▲97.1	▲14,076,191
13	▼11	Russia	Sheremetyevo International Airport	Moscow	28,422,391	30,623,796	▼7.2	▼2,201,405
14	▲2	Portugal	Lisbon Airport	Lisbon	28,261,883	12,149,201	▲132.6	▲16,112,682
15	▲12	Ireland	Dublin Airport	Dublin	28,085,562	8,455,325	▲232.2	▲19,630,237
16	▲2	Austria	Vienna International Airport	Vienna	23,682,133	10,405,523	▲127.6	▲13,276,610
17	▲21	United Kingdom	Manchester Airport	Manchester	23,369,770	6,098,891	▲283.2	▲17,270,879
18	▲13	United Kingdom	London Stansted Airport	London	23,319,523	7,137,113	▲226.7	▲16,182,410
19	▼4	Greece	Athens International Airport	Athens	22,728,668	12,345,786	▲84.1	▲10,382,882
20	▼1	Switzerland	Zurich Airport	Zürich	22,561,132	10,234,428	▲120.4	▲12,326,704
21	▲2	Norway	Oslo Airport, Gardermoen	Oslo	22,467,510	9,398,133	▲139.1	▲13,069,377
22	▲3	Denmark	Copenhagen Airport	Copenhagen	22,143,135	9,179,654	▲141.2	▲12,963,481
23	▼2	Italy	Malpensa Airport	Milan	21,347,652	9,622,464	▲121.9	▲11,725,188
24	▼19	Russia	Domodedovo International Airport	Moscow	21,205,549	25,065,087	▼15.4	▼3,859,538
25	▼5	Germany	Berlin Brandenburg Airport	Berlin	19,846,114	9,947,006	▲99.5	▲9,899,108
26	▼2	Belgium	Brussels Airport	Brussels	18,930,698	9,357,221	▲102.3	▲9,573,477
27	▼1	Spain	Málaga Airport	Málaga	18,458,006	8,874,635	▲108.0	▲9,583,371
28	▲1	Sweden	Stockholm Arlanda Airport	Stockholm	18,427,286	7,494,765	▲145.9	▲10,932,521
29	▼19	Russia	Pulkovo Airport	Saint Petersburg	18,140,100	18,043,464	▲0.5	▲96,636
30	▼19	Russia	Vnukovo International Airport	Moscow	16,400,000	17,999,084	▼8.9	▼1,599,084
31	▼3	Germany	Düsseldorf Airport	Düsseldorf	16,071,936	7,944,870	▲102.3	▲8,127,066
32	▼2	Poland	Warsaw Chopin Airport	Warsaw	14,413,889	7,473,734	▲92.9	▲6,940,155
33	▲6	Switzerland	Geneva Airport	Geneva	14,085,282	5,923,036	▲137.8	▲8,162,246
34	▲12	United Kingdom	Luton Airport	London	13,324,491	4,673,656	▲185.0	▲8,649,691
35	▲6	Spain	Alicante–Elche Miguel Hernández Airport	Alicante/Elche	13,206,430	5,841,144	▲126.1	▲7,365,286
36	▼1	Italy	Orio al Serio International Airport	Milan/Bergamo	13,155,806	6,467,296	▲103.4	▲6,688,510
37	▲17	Finland	Helsinki Airport	Helsinki	12,882,861	4,261,530	▲202.3	▲8,621,331
38	▲2	Portugal	Porto Airport	Porto	12,637,645	5,841,856	▲116.3	▲6,795,789
39	▼7	Romania	Henri Coandă International Airport	Bucharest	12,601,679	6,914,610	▲82.2	▲5,687,069
40	▲9	Hungary	Budapest Ferenc Liszt International Airport	Budapest	12,205,070	4,622,886	▲164.0	▲7,582,184
41	▼7	France	Nice Côte d'Azur Airport	Nice	12,119,043	6,540,424	▲85.3	▲5,578,619
42	▲35	United Kingdom	Edinburgh Airport	Edinburgh	11,261,873	3,024,960	▲272.3	▲8,236,913
43	▼1	Germany	Hamburg Airport	Hamburg	11,096,296	5,318,698	▲108.6	▲5,777,598
44	▲4	Italy	Naples Airport	Naples	10,918,234	4,636,501	▲135.5	▲6,281,733
45	▲7	Czech Republic	Václav Havel Airport Prague	Prague	10,734,880	4,388,826	▲144.6	▲6,346,054
46	▼9	Italy	Catania-Fontanarossa Airport	Catania	10,099,441	6,123,791	▲64.9	▲3,975,650
47	▲40	United Kingdom	Birmingham Airport	Birmingham	9,597,485	2,482,430	▲237.7	▲6,755,055
48	▲19	Italy	Venice Marco Polo Airport	Venice	9,319,156	3,437,204	▲171.1	▲5,881,952
49	▼2	France	Marseille Provence Airport	Marseille	9,148,306	4,661,045	▲96.3	▲4,487,261
50	▲5	Germany	Cologne Bonn Airport	Cologne/Bonn	8,756,712	4,253,568	▲105.9	▲4,503,144
51	Steady	France	Lyon–Saint-Exupéry Airport	Lyon	8,558,341	4,525,552	▲89.1	▲4,032,789
52	▲4	Italy	Bologna Guglielmo Marconi Airport	Bologna	8,496,000	4,103,816	▲107.0	▲4,392,184
53	▲9	Belgium	Brussels South Charleroi Airport	Charleroi	8,271,138	3,758,833	▲120.0	▲4,512,305
54	▲19	Portugal	Faro Airport	Faro	8,171,413	3,265,182	▲150.3	▲4,906,231
55	▼10	Spain	Ibiza Airport	Ibiza	8,156,708	4,851,941	▲68.1	▲3,304,767
56	▲1	Spain	Valencia Airport	Valencia	8,114,821	4,078,485	▲99.0	▲4,036,336
57	▼14	Greece	Heraklion International Airport	Heraklion	8,099,255	5,046,236	▲60.5	▲3,053,019
58	▲39	United Kingdom	Bristol Airport	Bristol	7,948,941	2,087,772	▲280.7	▲5,861,169
59	▼6	Italy	Linate Airport	Milan	7,719,977	4,346,518	▲77.6	▲3,373,459
60	▲15	Poland	Kraków John Paul II International Airport	Kraków	7,394,176	3,072,074	▲140.7	▲4,322,102
61	▼11	Italy	Falcone–Borsellino Airport	Palermo	7,117,822	4,576,246	▲55.5	▲2,541,576
62	▲1	France; Switzerland	EuroAirport Basel Mulhouse Freiburg	Basel/Mulhouse/Freiburg im Breisgau	7,050,905	3,621,742	▲94.7	▲3,429,163
63	▼2	France	Toulouse–Blagnac Airport	Toulouse	7,037,150	3,821,653	▲84.1	▲3,215,497
64	Steady	Germany	Stuttgart Airport	Stuttgart	6,997,032	3,573,728	▲95.8	▲3,423,304
65	▲1	Spain	Seville Airport	Seville	6,779,453	3,444,465	▲96.8	▲3,334,988
66	▲34	United Kingdom	Glasgow Airport	Glasgow	6,517,585	2,072,546	▲214.5	▲4,445,039
67	▲16	Netherlands	Eindhoven Airport	Eindhoven	6,330,599	2,698,424	▲134.9	▲3,632,175
68	New entry	Italy	Bari Airport	Bari	6,205,461	3,289,239	▲88.7	▲2,916,222
69	▲26	Iceland Iceland	Keflavík International Airport	Reykjavík	6,126,421	2,172,152	▲182.0	▲3,954,269
70	▼1	Bulgaria	Sofia Airport	Sofia	6,003,653	3,364,151	▲78.5	▲2,639,502
71	▲1	Norway	Bergen Airport, Flesland	Bergen	5,995,234	3,273,709	▲83.1	▲2,721,525
72	▼7	Greece	Thessaloniki Airport "Macedonia"	Thessaloniki	5,923,175	3,449,658	▲71.7	▲2,473,517
73	▼5	Greece	Rhodes International Airport	Rhodes	5,857,036	3,366,614	▲74.0	▲2,490,422
74	▲11	Malta	Malta International Airport	Malta	5,851,079	2,540,335	▲130.3	▲3,310,744
75	▼5	France	Nantes Atlantique Airport	Nantes	5,800,372	3,294,142	▲76.1	▲2,506,230
76	Steady	France	Bordeaux–Mérignac Airport	Bordeaux	5,704,455	3,050,881	▲87.0	▲2,653,574
77	▼6	Serbia	Belgrade Nikola Tesla Airport	Belgrade	5,611,729	3,286,285	▲70.8	▲2,325,444
78	▲10	Latvia	Riga International Airport	Riga	5,380,779	2,353,064	▲128.7	▲3,027,715
79	▲1	Albania	Tirana Airport	Tirana	5,198,550	2,923,533	▲77.8	▲2,275,017
80	▲4	Spain	Bilbao Airport	Bilbao	5,129,584	2,581,064	▲98.7	▲2,548,520
81	▲9	United Kingdom	Belfast International Airport	Belfast	4,818,214	2,328,276	▲106.9	▲2,489,938
82	▲17	France	Beauvais–Tillé Airport	Paris	4,614,424	2,073,643	▲122.5	▲2,540,781
83	▲13	Poland	Gdańsk Lech Wałęsa Airport	Gdańsk	4,576,705	2,154,563	▲112.4	▲2,422,142
84	New entry	Italy	Pisa International Airport	Pisa	4,493,847	1,999,137	▲124.8	▲2,494,710
85	New entry	Sweden	Göteborg Landvetter Airport	Gothenburg	4,445,970	1,908,000	▲133.0	▲2,537,970
86	▲3	Poland	Katowice Airport	Katowice	4,419,090	2,328,973	▲89.7	▲2,090,117
87	▼5	Italy	Cagliari Elmas Airport	Cagliari	4,396,594	2,753,899	▲59.6	▲1,642,695
88	New entry	Italy	Turin Airport	Turin	4,193,881	2,066,106	▲103.0	▲2,127,775
89	New entry	United Kingdom	Newcastle Airport	Newcastle upon Tyne	4,128,047	1,024,930	▲302.8	▲3,103,117
90	▼32	Russia	Ufa International Airport	Ufa	4,089,111	4,000,146	▲2.2	▲88,965
91	▼17	Russia	Mineralnye Vody Airport	Mineralnye Vody	4,086,000	3,204,709	▲27.5	▲881,291
92	New entry	Luxembourg	Luxembourg Airport	Luxembourg City	4,053,726	2,008,872	▲101.8	▲2,044,854
93	▼33	Russia	Kazan International Airport	Kazan	4,018,000	3,876,000	▲4	▲142,000
94	New entry	Germany	Hannover Airport	Hannover	3,961,983	2,057,452	▲92.6	▲1,904,531
95	New entry	Lithuania	Vilnius International Airport	Vilnius	3,915,960	1,898,817	▲106.2	▲2,017,143
96	▼4	Spain	Menorca Airport	Mahón	3,900,935	2,325,323	▲67.8	▲1,575,612
97	New entry	Norway	Trondheim Airport Værnes	Trondheim	3,803,933	2,062,299	▲84.5	▲1,741,634
98	▼5	Greece	Corfu International Airport	Corfu	3,749,106	2,317,336	▲61.8	▲1,431,770
99	▼39	Russia	Khrabrovo Airport	Kaliningrad	3,742,387	3,910,846	▼4.3	▼168,459
100	New entry	Denmark	Billund Airport	Billund	3,712,400	1,362,245	▲172.5	▲2,350,155

== 2021 ==
Rank 2021	Rank change 2020–2021	Country	Airport	City served	Passengers		Change 2020–2021	
Rank 2021	Rank change 2020–2021	Country	Airport	City served	2021	2020	%	Numbers
1	Steady	Turkey	Istanbul Airport	Istanbul	37,181,907	23,410,380	▲58.8	▲13,771,527
2	▲3	Russia	Sheremetyevo International Airport	Moscow	30,623,796	19,566,402	▲58.1	▲11,376,598
3	▼1	France	Charles de Gaulle Airport	Paris	26,196,575	22,257,469	▲17.7	▲3,939,106
4	Steady	Netherlands	Amsterdam Airport Schiphol	Amsterdam	25,492,633	20,884,044	▲22.1	▲4,608,019
5	▲3	Russia	Domodedovo International Airport	Moscow	25,065,087	16,389,427	▲52.9	▲8,675,573
6	Steady	Germany	Frankfurt am Main Airport	Frankfurt	24,812,849	18,768,601	▲32.2	▲6,044,248
7	Steady	Spain	Adolfo Suárez Madrid–Barajas Airport	Madrid	24,135,039	17,112,389	▲41.0	▲7,022,650
8	▼5	United Kingdom	Heathrow Airport	London	19,393,886	22,111,326	▼12.3	▼2,715,840
9	Steady	Spain	Josep Tarradellas Barcelona–El Prat Airport	Barcelona	18,875,461	12,739,259	▲48.2	▲6,136,202
10	▲2	Russia	Pulkovo Airport	Saint Petersburg	18,043,464	10,944,421	▲64.8	▲7,089,994
11	▼1	Russia	Vnukovo International Airport	Moscow	17,999,084	12,565,241	▲43.2	▲5,433,843
12	▲1	France	Orly Airport	Paris	15,724,580	10,797,105	▲45.6	▲4,927,475
13	▲16	Spain	Palma de Mallorca Airport	Palma de Mallorca	14,497,159	6,108,486	▲137.3	▲8,388,673
14	▼3	Germany	Munich Airport	Munich	12,496,432	11,120,224	▲12.4	▲1,376,208
15	▲4	Greece	Athens International Airport	Athens	12,345,786	8,078,394	▲52.8	▲4,267,392
16	Steady	Portugal	Lisbon Airport	Lisbon	12,149,201	9,260,567	▲31.2	▲2,888,634
17	▼2	Italy	Leonardo da Vinci–Fiumicino Airport	Rome	11,662,842	9,830,957	▲18.6	▲1,831,885
18	▲2	Austria	Vienna International Airport	Vienna	10,405,523	7,812,938	▲33.2	▲2.592.585
19	▼1	Switzerland	Zurich Airport	Zürich	10,234,428	8,341,047	▲22.7	▲1,893,381
20	New entry	Germany	Berlin Brandenburg Airport	Berlin	9,947,006	444,893	▲2135.8	▲9,502,113
21	▲3	Italy	Malpensa Airport	Milan	9,622,464	7,241,766	▲32.9	▲2,380,698
22	▲13	Ukraine	Boryspil International Airport	Kyiv	9,433,000	5,157,848	▲82.9	▲4,275,152
23	▼6	Norway	Oslo Airport, Gardermoen	Oslo	9,398,133	9,021,729	▲4.2	▲376,404
24	▲2	Belgium	Brussels Airport	Brussels	9,357,221	6,743,395	▲38.8	▲2,613,826
25	▼3	Denmark	Copenhagen Airport	Copenhagen	9,179,654	7,525,441	▲22.0	▲1,654,213
26	▲8	Spain	Málaga Airport	Málaga	8,874,635	5,161,636	▲71.9	▲3,712,999
27	▼4	Ireland	Dublin Airport	Dublin	8,455,325	7,400,000	▲14.3	▲1,055,325
28	▼1	Germany	Düsseldorf Airport	Düsseldorf	7,944,870	6,569,728	▲20.9	▲1,375,142
29	▼1	Sweden	Stockholm Arlanda Airport	Stockholm	7,494,765	6,535,776	▲14.7	▲958,989
30	▲2	Poland	Warsaw Chopin Airport	Warsaw	7,473,734	5,482,000	▲36.3	▲1,991,734
31	▼10	United Kingdom	London Stansted Airport	London	7,148,200	7,543,779	▼5.4	▼406,666
32	▲8	Romania	Henri Coandă International Airport	Bucharest	6,914,610	4,456,000	▲55.2	▲2,458,610
33	▲4	Ukraine (Note: Crimea is controlled by Russia since March 2014.)	Simferopol International Airport	Simferopol	6,830,000	4,630,000	▲47.5	▲2,200,000
34	▲4	France	Nice Côte d'Azur Airport	Nice	6,540,424	4,580,459	▲42.8	▲1,959,965
35	▲8	Italy	Orio al Serio International Airport	Milan/Bergamo	6,467,296	3,833,063	▲68.7	▲2,634,233
36	▼22	United Kingdom	Gatwick Airport	London	6,260,072	10,171,867	▼38.5	▼3,916,867
37	▲9	Italy	Catania-Fontanarossa Airport	Catania	6,123,791	3,654,457	▲67.6	▲2,469,334
38	▼13	United Kingdom	Manchester Airport	Manchester	6,098,891	7,037,036	▼13.3	▼938,145
39	▼8	Switzerland	Geneva Airport	Geneva	5,923,036	5,600,914	▲5.6	▲322,122
40	▲1	Portugal	Porto Airport	Porto	5,841,856	4,432,963	▲31.8	▲1,408,893
41	▲3	Spain	Alicante–Elche Miguel Hernández Airport	Alicante/Elche	5,841,144	3,739,499	▲56.2	▲2,101,645
42	▼3	Germany	Hamburg Airport	Hamburg	5,318,698	4,557,372	▲16.6	▲761,326
43	▲23	Greece	Heraklion International Airport	Heraklion	5,046,236	2,378,145	▲110,4	▲2,647,972
44	▲10	Russia	Krasnodar International Airport	Krasnodar	5,022,243	3,076,447	▲63.3	▲1,948,484
45	▲33	Spain	Ibiza Airport	Ibiza	4,851,941	2,110,348	▲129.9	▲2,741,593
46	▼13	United Kingdom	Luton Airport	London	4,673,656	5,472,826	▼15.8	▼799,170
47	▲2	France	Marseille Provence Airport	Marseille	4,661,045	3,359,149	▲38.8	▲1,301,896
48	▲10	Italy	Naples Airport	Naples	4,636,501	2,779,946	▲66.8	▲1,856,555
49	▼7	Hungary	Budapest Ferenc Liszt International Airport	Budapest	4,622,886	3,859,379	▲19.8	▲763,507
50	▲10	Italy	Falcone–Borsellino Airport	Palermo	4,576,246	2,701,519	▲69.4	▲1,874,727
51	▼4	France	Lyon–Saint-Exupéry Airport	Lyon	4,525,552	3,553,918	▲27.3	▲976,082
52	▼7	Czech Republic	Václav Havel Airport Prague	Prague	4,388,826	3,665,871	▲19.7	▲722,955
53	▲18	Italy	Linate Airport	Milan	4,346,518	2,274,202	▲91.1	▲2,072,316
54	▼18	Finland	Helsinki Airport	Helsinki	4,261,530	5,053,134	▼15.7	▼791,604
55	▼2	Germany	Cologne Bonn Airport	Cologne/Bonn	4,253,568	3,076,587	▲38.1	▲1,176,981
56	▲8	Italy	Bologna Guglielmo Marconi Airport	Bologna	4,103,816	2,506,258	▲63.7	▲1,590,029
57	▲8	Spain	Valencia Airport	Valencia	4,078,485	2,487,496	▲64	▲1,590,989
58	▲9	Russia	Ufa International Airport	Ufa	4,000,146	2,368,689	▲68.9	▲1,631,457
59	▲17	Russia	Khrabrovo Airport	Kaliningrad	3,910,846	2,117,931	▲84.7	▲1,792,915
60	▲15	Russia	Kazan International Airport	Kazan	3,876,000	2,171,603	▲78.5	▲1,704,397
61	▼9	France	Toulouse–Blagnac Airport	Toulouse	3,821,653	3,130,847	▲22.1	▲690,806
62	▲1	Belgium	Brussels South Charleroi Airport	Charleroi	3,758,833	2,559,372	▲46.9	▲1,199,461
63	▼2	France; Switzerland	EuroAirport Basel Mulhouse Freiburg	Basel/Mulhouse/Freiburg im Breisgau	3,621,742	2,598,980	▲39.4	▲1,022,762
64	▼13	Germany	Stuttgart Airport	Stuttgart	3,573,728	3,213,695	▲11.4	▲360,033
65	▲4	Greece	Thessaloniki Airport "Macedonia"	Thessaloniki	3,449,658	2,317,336	▲48.9	▲1,132,322
66	▲4	Spain	Seville Airport	Seville	3,444,465	2,315,610	▲48.7	▲1,128,855
67	▼10	Italy	Venice Marco Polo Airport	Venice	3,437,204	2,799,688	▲22.8	▲637,516
68	▲29	Greece	Rhodes International Airport	Rhodes	3,366,614	1,551,123	▲117.0	▲1,815,491
69	▼14	Bulgaria	Sofia Airport	Sofia	3,364,151	2,937,846	▲14.5	▲426,305
70	▼2	France	Nantes Atlantique Airport	Nantes	3,294,142	2,327,718	▲41.5	▲966,282
71	▲8	Serbia	Belgrade Nikola Tesla Airport	Belgrade	3,286,285	1,904,025	▲72.6	▲1,381,975
72	▼13	Norway	Bergen Airport, Flesland	Bergen	3,273,709	2,711,276	▲20.7	▲562,433
73	Steady	Portugal	Faro Airport	Faro	3,265,182	2206635	▲48.0	▲1,058,547
74	▲12	Russia	Mineralnye Vody Airport	Mineralnye Vody	3,204,709	1,797,989	▲79.4	▲1,427,072
75	▼13	Poland	Kraków John Paul II International Airport	Kraków	3,072,074	2,592,972	▲18.5	▲479,028
76	▼4	France	Bordeaux–Mérignac Airport	Bordeaux	3,050,881	2,253,000	▲34.7	▲797,881
77	▼29	United Kingdom	Edinburgh Airport	Edinburgh	3,023,614	3,473,652	▼13.0	▼450,038
78	▲15	Russia	Kurumoch International Airport	Samara	2,993,142	1,675,034	▲79	▲1,324,108
79	▲5	Russia	Anapa Airport	Anapa	2,931,057	1,813,347	▲61.7	▲1,119,009
80	New entry	Albania	Tirana Airport	Tirana	2,923,533	1,310,614	▲123.1	▲1,612,919
81	▼2	Russia	Platov International Airport	Rostov-on-Don	2,897,938	2,086,000	▲39.5	▲824,000
82	▲5	Italy	Cagliari Elmas Airport	Cagliari	2,753,899	1,767,890	▲55.8	▲986,009
83	▼6	Netherlands	Eindhoven Airport	Eindhoven	2,698,424	2,112,785	▲27.7	▲585,639
84	▼8	Spain	Bilbao Airport	Bilbao	2,581,064	1,690,011	▲52.7	▲891,053
85	▲3	Malta	Malta International Airport	Malta	2,540,335	1,748,050	▲45.3	▲792,285
86	▼4	Belarus	Minsk National Airport	Minsk	~2,500,000	1,939,192	▲30	▲ ~560,000
87	▼31	United Kingdom	Birmingham Airport	Birmingham	2,482,430	2,865,845	▼13.4	▼383,415
88	▼8	Latvia	Riga International Airport	Riga	2,353,064	2,010,000	▲16.9	▲340,000
89	▲11	Poland	Katowice Airport	Katowice	2,328,973	1,445,781	▲61.1	▲883,192
90	▼1	United Kingdom	Belfast International Airport	Belfast	2,327,139	1,746,951	▲33.2	▲583,049
91	▲4	Italy	Ciampino Airport	Rome	2,326,113	1,621,159	▲43.5	▲704,954
92	New entry	Spain	Menorca Airport	Mahón	2,325,323	1,076,952	▲115.9	▲1,248,371
93	New entry	Greece	Corfu International Airport	Corfu	2,317,336	961,037	▲112.7	▲1,356,299
94	New entry	Kosovo Kosovo	Pristina International Airport	Pristina	2,180,809	1,104,435	▲97.5	▲1,076,374
95	New entry	Iceland Iceland	Keflavík International Airport	Reykjavík	2,172,152	1,373,971	▲58.1	▲798,181
96	▼6	Poland	Gdańsk Lech Wałęsa Airport	Gdańsk	2,154,563	1,711,281	▲25.9	▲443,282
97	▼22	United Kingdom	Bristol Airport	Bristol	2,085,745	2,192,725	▼4.9	▼106,980
98	New entry	Italy	Olbia Costa Smeralda Airport	Olbia	2,081,057	1,023,552	▲103.2	▲1,057,505
99	New entry	France	Beauvais–Tillé Airport	Paris	2,073,643	1,258,180	▲64.8	▲815,463
100	▼18	United Kingdom	Glasgow Airport	Glasgow	2,071,124	1,944,981	▲6.5	▲126,143

== 2020 ==
Rank 2020	Rank change 2019–2020	Country	Airport	City served	Passengers		Change 2019–2020	
Rank 2020	Rank change 2019–2020	Country	Airport	City served	2020	2019	%	Numbers
1	▲6	Turkey	Istanbul Airport	Istanbul	23,410,380	52,009,220	55%	28,598,840
2	Steady	France	Charles de Gaulle Airport	Paris	22,257,469	76,150,007	70.8%	53,892,538
3	▼2	United Kingdom	Heathrow Airport	London	22,111,326	80,890,031	72.7%	58,778,705
4	▼1	Netherlands	Amsterdam Airport Schiphol	Amsterdam	20,884,044	71,706,999	70.9%	50,822,955
5	▲3	Russia	Sheremetyevo International Airport	Moscow	19,566,402	49,438,469	60.4%	29,872,067
6	▼2	Germany	Frankfurt am Main Airport	Frankfurt	18,768,601	70,560,987	73.4%	51,792,386
7	▼2	Spain	Adolfo Suárez Madrid–Barajas Airport	Madrid	17,112,389	61,734,944	72.3%	44,622,555
8	▲14	Russia	Domodedovo International Airport	Moscow	16,389,427	28,252,337	42.0%	11,862,910
9	▼3	Spain	Josep Tarradellas Barcelona–El Prat Airport	Barcelona	12,739,259	52,688,455	75.8%	39,949,196
10	▲19	Russia	Vnukovo International Airport	Moscow	12,565,241	24,001,521	47.6%	11,436,280
11	▼2	Germany	Munich Airport	Munich	11,120,224	47,959,885	76.81%	36,839,661
12	▲20	Russia	Pulkovo Airport	Saint Petersburg	10,944,421	19,581,262	44.1%	8,636,841
13	Steady	France	Orly Airport	Paris	10,797,105	31,853,049	66.1%	21,055,944
14	▼4	United Kingdom	Gatwick Airport	London	10,171,867	46,081,327	78.2%	35,909,460
15	▼4	Italy	Leonardo da Vinci–Fiumicino Airport	Rome	9,830,957	43,532,573	77.4%	33,701,616
16	Steady	Portugal	Lisbon Airport	Lisbon	9,260,567	31,172,774	70.3%	21,912,207
17	▲4	Norway	Oslo Airport, Gardermoen	Oslo	9,021,729	28,592,619	68.45%	19,570,890
18	▼3	Switzerland	Zurich Airport	Zürich	8,341,047	31,507,692	73.5%	23,166,645
19	▲7	Greece	Athens International Airport	Athens	8,078,383	25,573,993	68.4%	17,495,610
20	▼6	Austria	Vienna International Airport	Vienna	7,812,938	31,662,189	75.3%	23,849,251
21	▲2	United Kingdom	London Stansted Airport	London	7,543,779	28,124,292	73.2%	20,580,513
22	▼5	Denmark	Copenhagen Airport	Copenhagen	7,525,441	30,256,703	75.12%	22,731,262
23	▼11	Ireland	Dublin Airport	Dublin	7,400,000	32,676,251	77.4%	25,276,251
24	▼4	Italy	Malpensa Airport	Milan	7,241,766	28,846,299	74.9%	21,604,533
25	▼6	United Kingdom	Manchester Airport	Manchester	7,037,036	29,367,477	76.0%	21,217,934
26	▼2	Belgium	Brussels Airport	Brussels	6,743,395	26,360,003	74.42%	19,616,608
27	Steady	Germany	Düsseldorf Airport	Düsseldorf	6,569,728	24,283,967	74.2%	17,714,239
28	▼3	Sweden	Stockholm Arlanda Airport	Stockholm	6,535,776	25,642,623	74.5%	19,106,847
29	▼11	Spain	Palma de Mallorca Airport	Palma de Mallorca	6,108,486	29,721,142	79.4%	23,612,656
30	▼2	Germany	Berlin Tegel Airport	Berlin	5,867,601	24,227,570	75.8%	18,359,969
31	▲4	Switzerland	Geneva Airport	Geneva	5,600,914	17,926,629	68.8%	12,325,715
32	▲1	Poland	Warsaw Chopin Airport	Warsaw	5,482,000	18,869,302	70.95%	13,387,302
33	▲1	United Kingdom	Luton Airport	London	5,472,826	17,999,969	69.6%	12,527,143
34	▼3	Spain	Málaga Airport	Málaga	5,161,636	19,858,656	74.0%	14,697,020
35	▲5	Ukraine	Boryspil International Airport	Kyiv	5,157,848	15,260,281	66%	10,102,433
36	▼6	Finland	Helsinki Airport	Helsinki	5,053,134	21,861,082	76.9%	16,807,948
37	▲53	Ukraine	Simferopol International Airport	Simferopol	4,630,000	5,146,095	9.9%	516,095
38	▲6	France	Nice Côte d'Azur Airport	Nice	4,580,459	14,485,423	68.4%	9,904,964
39	▼2	Germany	Hamburg Airport	Hamburg	4,557,372	17,234,229	73.6%	12,676,857
40	▲3	Romania	Henri Coandă International Airport	Bucharest	4,456,000	14,707,376	69.7%	10,251,376
41	▲3	Portugal	Porto Airport	Porto	4,432,963	13,105,339	66.2%	8,672,376
42	▼4	Hungary	Budapest Ferenc Liszt International Airport	Budapest	3,859,379	16,173,399	76.14%	12,314,020
43	▲2	Italy	Orio al Serio International Airport	Milan/Bergamo	3,833,063	13,857,257	72.3%	10,024,194
44	▼3	Spain	Alicante–Elche Airport	Alicante/Elche	3,739,499	15,048,240	75.1%	11,308,741
45	▼9	Czech Republic	Václav Havel Airport Prague	Prague	3,665,871	17,804,900	79%	14,139,029
46	▲8	Italy	Catania-Fontanarossa Airport	Catania	3,654,457	10,223,113	64.3%	6,568,656
47	▲3	France	Lyon–Saint-Exupéry Airport	Lyon	3,553,918	11,739,600	69,7%	8,185,682
48	▼6	United Kingdom	Edinburgh Airport	Edinburgh	3,473,652	14,733,966	76.4%	11,300,314
49	▲6	France	Marseille Provence Airport	Marseille	3,359,149	10,151,743	66.9%	6,792,594
50	▲2	Germany	Berlin Schönefeld Airport	Berlin	3,223,603	11,417,435	71.7%	8,193,832
51	▼4	Germany	Stuttgart Airport	Stuttgart	3,213,695	12,732,670	74.8%	9,518,975
52	▲4	France	Toulouse–Blagnac Airport	Toulouse	3,130,847	9,620,224	67.5%	6,489,377
53	▼4	Germany	Cologne Bonn Airport	Cologne/Bonn	3,076,587	12,369,000	75.1%	9,292,413
54	▲44	Russia	Krasnodar International Airport	Krasnodar	3,076,447	4,631,000	33.5%	1,554,553
55	▲18	Bulgaria	Sofia Airport	Sofia	2,937,846	7,107,096	58.70%	4,169,250
56	▼8	United Kingdom	Birmingham Airport	Birmingham	2,865,845	12,454,642	77.3%	9,588,797
57	▼6	Italy	Venice Marco Polo Airport	Venice	2,799,688	11,561,594	75.8%	8,761,906
58	▼5	Italy	Naples Airport	Naples	2,779,946	10,860,068	74.4%	8,080,122
59	▲18	Norway	Bergen Airport, Flesland	Bergen	2,711,276	6,505,827	58.3%	3,794,551
60	▲14	Italy	Falcone–Borsellino Airport	Palermo	2,701,519	7,018,087	61.5%	6,491,145
61	▼3	France; Switzerland	EuroAirport Basel Mulhouse Freiburg	Basel/Mulhouse/Freiburg im Breisgau	2,598,980	9,094,821	71.4%	6,495,841
62	▲1	Poland	Kraków John Paul II International Airport	Kraków	2,592,972	8,410,817	69.2%	5,817,904
63	▲1	Belgium	Brussels South Charleroi Airport	Charleroi	2,559,372	8,226,572	68.9%	5,667,200
64	▼7	Italy	Bologna Guglielmo Marconi Airport	Bologna	2,506,258	9,405,920	73.4%	6,899,662
65	▼3	Spain	Valencia Airport	Valencia	2,487,496	8,539,579	70.9%	6,052,083
66	Steady	Greece	Heraklion International Airport	Heraklion	2,378,145	7,839,255	69.7%	5,461,110
67	New entry	Russia	Ufa International Airport	Ufa	2,368,689	3,556,533	33%	1,878,844
68	▲4	France	Nantes Atlantique Airport	Nantes	2,327,718	7,227,411	67,8%	4,899,693
69	▲6	Greece	Thessaloniki Airport "Macedonia"	Thessaloniki	2,317,336	6,895,331	66.4%	4,577,995
70	▼1	Spain	Seville Airport	Seville	2,315,610	7,544,357	69.3%	5,228,747
71	▲7	Italy	Linate Airport	Milan	2,274,202	6,570,984	65.4%	4,296,782
72	▼4	France	Bordeaux–Mérignac Airport	Bordeaux	2,264,368	7,703,135	70.6%	5,438,767
73	▼14	Portugal	Faro Airport	Faro	2,206,635	9,008,991	75.5%	6,802,356
74	▼14	United Kingdom	Bristol Airport	Bristol	2,192,725	8,696,653	75.5%	16,807,948
75	New entry	Russia	Kazan International Airport	Kazan	2,171,603	3,470,742	38%	6,503,928
76	New entry	Russia	Khrabrovo Airport	Kaliningrad	2,117,931	2,370,157	10.9%	252,226
77	▼1	Netherlands	Eindhoven Airport	Eindhoven	2,112,785	6,780,775	68.8%	4,667,990
78	▼13	Spain	Ibiza Airport	Ibiza	2,110,348	8,155,626	74.1%	6,045,278
79	New entry	Russia	Platov International Airport	Rostov-on-Don	2,086,000	3,060,000	31.8%	974,000
80	▼13	Latvia	Riga International Airport	Riga	2,010,000	7,798,382	74.2%	5,788,382
81	▼20	United Kingdom	Glasgow Airport	Glasgow	1,944,981	9,652,216	78.0%	7,707,235
82	▲10	Belarus	Minsk National Airport	Minsk	1,939,192	5,101,766	62%	3,162,574
83	▼1	Serbia	Belgrade Nikola Tesla Airport	Belgrade	1,904,025	6,159,000	69.1%	4,254,975
84	New entry	Russia	Anapa Airport	Anapa	1,813,347	1,641,000	10.5%	172,347
85	▲15	Norway	Trondheim Airport Værnes	Trondheim	1,802,826	4,381,921	58.9%	2,579,095
86	New entry	Russia	Mineralnye Vody Airport	Mineralnye Vody	1,797,989	2,526,419	28.8%	728,430
87	▲9	Italy	Cagliari Elmas Airport	Cagliari	1,767,890	4,747,806	62.8%	2,979,916
88	▼18	Malta	Malta International Airport	Malta	1,748,050	7,310,289	76.1%	5,562,239
89	▼8	United Kingdom	Belfast International Airport	Belfast	1,746,951	6,268,953	72.2%	4,522,002
90	▼2	Poland	Gdańsk Lech Wałęsa Airport	Gdańsk	1,711,281	5,376,120	68.2%	3,664,839
91	▼6	Italy	Bari Airport	Bari	1,703,130	5,545,588	69.3%	3,842,458
92	▼9	Spain	Bilbao Airport	Bilbao	1,690,011	5,905,820	71.4%	4,215,809
93	New entry	Russia	Kurumoch International Airport	Samara	1,675,034	2,999,000	43.8%	1,315,000
94	New entry	Norway	Stavanger Airport Sola	Stavanger	1,674,900	4,309,723	61.1%	2,634,823
95	▼11	Italy	Ciampino Airport	Rome	1,621,159	5,879,496	72.4%	4,258,337
96	▼19	Sweden	Göteborg Landvetter Airport	Gothenburg	1,576,787	6,807,976	76.8%	5,231,189
97	▼11	Greece	Rhodes International Airport	Rhodes	1,551,123	5,542,223	72.0%	3,991,100
98	▼18	Germany	Langenhagen Airport	Hanover	1,452,361	6,324,634	77.0%	4,872,273
99	▼3	Poland	Katowice Airport	Katowice	1,445,781	4,843,889	70.1%	3,398,108
100	▼1	Luxembourg	Luxembourg Airport	Luxembourg City	1,425,880	4,416,038	67.7%	2,990,158

== 2019 ==
Rank 2019	Rank change 2018–2019	Country	Airport	City served	Passengers		Change 2018–2019	
Rank 2019	Rank change 2018–2019	Country	Airport	City served	2019	2018	%	Numbers
1	0	United Kingdom	Heathrow Airport	London	80,890,031	80,124,537	1.0%	765,494
2	0	France	Charles de Gaulle Airport	Paris	76,150,007	72,229,723	5.4%	3,920,284
3	0	Netherlands	Amsterdam Airport Schiphol	Amsterdam	71,706,999	71,053,147	0.9%	653,852
4	0	Germany	Frankfurt am Main Airport	Frankfurt	70,556,072	69,510,269	1.5%	1,045,803
5	1	Spain	Adolfo Suárez Madrid–Barajas Airport	Madrid	61,734,037	57,891,340	6.6%	3,842,697
6	1	Spain	Josep Tarradellas Barcelona–El Prat Airport	Barcelona	52,686,314	50,172,457	5.0%	2,513,857
7	New entry	Turkey	Istanbul Airport	Istanbul	52,009,220	95,205	54528.7%	51,914,015
8	2	Russia	Sheremetyevo International Airport	Moscow	49,438,545	45,348,150	9.0%	4,090,395
9	1	Germany	Munich Airport	Munich	47,941,348	46,253,620	3.6%	1,687,728
10	1	United Kingdom	Gatwick Airport	London	46,574,786	46,081,327	1.1%	493,459
11	0	Italy	Leonardo da Vinci–Fiumicino Airport	Rome	43,532,573	42,995,119	1.3%	537,454
12	1	Ireland	Dublin Airport	Dublin	32,907,673	31,497,526	4.5%	1,410,147
13	1	France	Orly Airport	Paris	31,853,049	33,120,685	3.8%	1,267,636
14	8	Austria	Vienna International Airport	Vienna	31,662,189	27,037,292	17.1%	4,624,897
15	1	Switzerland	Zurich Airport	Zürich	31,507,692	31,113,488	1.3%	394,204
16	2	Portugal	Lisbon Airport	Lisbon	31,172,774	29,031,268	7.4%	2,141,506
17	2	Denmark	Copenhagen Airport	Copenhagen	30,256,703	30,298,531	0.1%	41,828
18	1	Spain	Palma de Mallorca Airport	Palma de Mallorca	29,721,123	29,081,787	2.2%	639,336
19	1	United Kingdom	Manchester Airport	Manchester	29,367,477	28,254,970	3.9%	1,112,507
20	5	Italy	Malpensa Airport	Milan	28,846,299	24,725,490	16.7%	4,120,809
21	2	Norway	Oslo Airport, Gardermoen	Oslo	28,592,619	28,518,584	0.3%	74,035
22	6	Russia	Domodedovo International Airport	Moscow	28,252,337	29,403,704	3.9%	1,151,367
23	2	United Kingdom	London Stansted Airport	London	28,124,292	27,995,121	0.5%	129,171
24	0	Belgium	Brussels Airport	Brussels	26,360,003	25,675,939	2.7%	684,064
25	2	Sweden	Stockholm Arlanda Airport	Stockholm	25,642,703	26,845,419	4.5%	1,202,716
26	1	Greece	Athens International Airport	Athens	25,574,030	24,135,736	6.0%	1,438,294
27	1	Germany	Düsseldorf Airport	Düsseldorf	25,507,566	24,283,967	5.0%	1,223,599
28	0	Germany	Berlin Tegel Airport	Berlin	24,227,570	22,000,430	10.1%	2,227,140
29	0	Russia	Vnukovo International Airport	Moscow	24,001,521	21,478,486	11.7%	2,523,035
30	0	Finland	Helsinki Airport	Helsinki	21,861,082	20,848,838	4.9%	1,012,244
31	0	Spain	Málaga Airport	Málaga	19,856,299	19,021,704	4.4%	834,595
32	0	Russia	Pulkovo Airport	Saint Petersburg	19,581,262	18,123,064	8.0%	1,458,198
33	0	Poland	Warsaw Chopin Airport	Warsaw	18,869,302	17,755,543	6.3%	1,113,760
34	3	United Kingdom	Luton Airport	London	18,213,901	16,766,552	8.6%	1,447,349
35	1	Switzerland	Geneva Airport	Geneva	17,926,629	17,677,035	1.4%	249,594
36	0	Czech Republic	Václav Havel Airport Prague	Prague	17,804,900	16,797,006	6.0%	1,007,894
37	2	Germany	Hamburg Airport	Hamburg	17,308,773	17,234,229	0.4%	74,544
38	0	Hungary	Budapest Ferenc Liszt International Airport	Budapest	16,173,399	14,867,491	8.8%	1,305,908
39	34	Turkey	Istanbul Atatürk Airport	Istanbul	16,112,804	68,346,784	76.4%	52,233,980
40	6	Ukraine	Boryspil International Airport	Kyiv	15,260,281	12,602,933	21.1%	2,657,348
41	1	Spain	Alicante–Elche Airport	Alicante/Elche	15,047,840	13,981,320	7.6%	1,066,520
42	3	United Kingdom	Edinburgh Airport	Edinburgh	14,733,966	14,291,811	3.1%	442,155
43	1	Romania	Henri Coandă International Airport	Bucharest	14,707,376	13,820,428	6.4%	886,948
44	3	France	Nice Côte d'Azur Airport	Nice	14,485,423	13,850,561	4.6%	634,862
45	1	Italy	Orio al Serio International Airport	Milan/Bergamo	13,857,257	12,938,572	7.1%	918,685
46	2	Portugal	Porto Airport	Porto	13,105,339	11,939,562	9.8%	1,165,777
47	2	Germany	Stuttgart Airport	Stuttgart	12,721,441	11,798,090	9.8%	923,351
48	1	United Kingdom	Birmingham Airport	Birmingham	12,646,456	12,454,642	1.5%	191,814
49	6	Germany	Cologne Bonn Airport	Cologne/Bonn	12,368,519	12,957,828	4.5%	589,309
50	1	France	Lyon–Saint-Exupéry Airport	Lyon	11,739,600	11,037,413	6.4%	702,187
51	1	Italy	Venice Marco Polo Airport	Venice	11,561,594	11,184,608	3.4%	376,986
52	7	Germany	Berlin Schönefeld Airport	Berlin	11,417,435	12,725,937	10.3%	1,308,502
53	0	Italy	Naples Airport	Naples	10,860,068	9,932,029	9.3%	928,039
54	2	Italy	Catania-Fontanarossa Airport	Catania	10,223,113	9,933,318	2.9%	289,795
55	2	France	Marseille Provence Airport	Marseille	10,151,743	9,390,371	8.1%	761,372
56	0	France	Toulouse–Blagnac Airport	Toulouse	9,620,224	9,630,308	0.1%	10,084
57	5	Italy	Bologna Guglielmo Marconi Airport	Bologna	9,405,920	8,506,658	10.6%	899,262
58	3	France; Switzerland	EuroAirport Basel Mulhouse Freiburg	Basel/Mulhouse/Freiburg im Breisgau	9,094,821	8,578,064	6.0%	516,757
59	1	Portugal	Faro Airport	Faro	9,008,991	8,685,571	3.7%	323,420
60	1	United Kingdom	Bristol Airport	Bristol	8,959,679	8,696,653	3.0%	263,026
61	6	United Kingdom	Glasgow Airport	Glasgow	8,843,214	9,652,216	8.4%	809,002
62	4	Spain	Valencia Airport	Valencia	8,539,403	7,769,867	9.9%	769,536
63	9	Poland	Kraków John Paul II International Airport	Kraków	8,410,817	6,769,369	24.2%	1,641,448
64	0	Belgium	Brussels South Charleroi Airport	Charleroi	8,226,572	8,033,071	2.4%	193,501
65	2	Spain	Ibiza Airport	Ibiza	8,155,635	8,104,316	0.6%	51,319
66	1	Greece	Heraklion International Airport	Heraklion	7,839,255	8,149,936	3.8%	310,681
67	0	Latvia	Riga International Airport	Riga	7,798,382	7,056,099	10.5%	742,283
68	3	France	Bordeaux–Mérignac Airport	Bordeaux	7,703,135	6,799,572	13.3%	903,563
69	6	Spain	Seville Airport	Seville	7,544,473	6,380,465	18.2%	1,164,008
70	1	Malta	Malta International Airport	Malta	7,310,289	6,808,177	7.4%	502,112
71	17	Iceland	Keflavík International Airport	Reykjavík	7,247,820	9,804,388	26.1%	2,556,568
72	7	France	Nantes Atlantique Airport	Nantes	7,227,411	6,199,181	16.6%	1,028,230
73	5	Bulgaria	Sofia Airport	Sofia	7,107,096	6,962,040	2.1%	145,056
74	1	Italy	Falcone–Borsellino Airport	Palermo	7,018,087	6,628,558	5.9%	389,529
75	1	Greece	Thessaloniki Airport "Macedonia"	Thessaloniki	6,897,057	6,689,193	3.1%	207,864
76	3	Netherlands	Eindhoven Airport	Eindhoven	6,780,775	6,237,755	8.7%	543,000
77	6	Sweden	Göteborg Landvetter Airport	Gothenburg	6,671,361	6,807,976	2.0%	136,615
78	19	Italy	Linate Airport	Milan	6,570,984	9,233,475	28.8%	2,662,491
79	1	Norway	Bergen Airport, Flesland	Bergen	6,505,827	6,306,623	3.2%	199,204
80	3	Germany	Langenhagen Airport	Hanover	6,301,366	6,324,634	0.4%	23,268
81	2	United Kingdom	Belfast International Airport	Belfast	6,278,374	6,268,953	0.2%	9,421
82	0	Serbia	Belgrade Nikola Tesla Airport	Belgrade	6,159,000	5,641,105	9.2%	517,895
83	0	Spain	Bilbao Airport	Bilbao	5,905,804	5,469,453	8.0%	436,351
84	3	Italy	Ciampino Airport	Rome	5,879,496	5,839,737	0.7%	39,759
85	4	Italy	Bari Airport	Bari	5,545,588	5,030,760	10.2%	514,828
86	0	Greece	Rhodes International Airport	Rhodes	5,542,567	5,567,748	0.5%	25,181
87	3	Italy	Galileo Galilei Airport	Pisa	5,387,558	5,463,090	1.4%	75,532
88	2	Poland	Gdańsk Lech Wałęsa Airport	Gdańsk	5,376,120	4,980,647	7.9%	395,473
89	4	United Kingdom	Newcastle Airport	Newcastle upon Tyne	5,198,952	5,332,238	2.5%	133,286
90	3	Ukraine	Simferopol International Airport	Simferopol	5,140,000	5,146,095	0.1%	6,095
91	2	United Kingdom	London City Airport	London	5,122,039	4,820,292	6.3%	301,747
92	4	Belarus	Minsk National Airport	Minsk	5,101,766	4,536,618	12.5%	565,148
93	2	Lithuania	Vilnius Airport	Vilnius	5,004,921	4,922,949	1.7%	81,972
94	6	United Kingdom	Liverpool John Lennon Airport	Liverpool	5,000,176	5,042,312	0.8%	42,136
95	2	Poland	Katowice Airport	Katowice	4,843,889	4,838,149	0.1%	5,740
96	2	Italy	Cagliari Elmas Airport	Cagliari	4,747,806	4,370,014	8.6%	377,792
97	5	United Kingdom	East Midlands Airport	Derby/Leicester/Nottingham	4,674,338	4,873,757	4.1%	199,237
98	2	Russia	Krasnodar International Airport	Krasnodar	4,630,770	4,160,053	11.3%	483,699
99	New entry	Luxembourg	Luxembourg Airport	Luxembourg City	4,416,038	4,036,878	9.4%	379,160
100	3	Norway	Trondheim Airport Værnes	Trondheim	4,381,921	4,441,791	1.3%	59,870

== 2018 ==
Rank 2018	Rank change 2017–2018	Country	Airport	City served	Passengers 2018	Passengers 2017	Change % 2017–2018	Passengers change 2017–2018
1.	0	United Kingdom	Heathrow Airport	London	80,124,537	78,012,825	2.7%	2,111,712
2.	0	France	Charles de Gaulle Airport	Paris	72,229,723	69,471,442	4.0%	2,758,281
3.	0	Netherlands	Amsterdam Airport Schiphol	Amsterdam	71,053,147	68,515,425	3.7%	2,537,722
4.	0	Germany	Frankfurt am Main Airport	Frankfurt	69,510,269	64,500,386	7.8%	5,009,883
5.	0	Turkey	Istanbul Atatürk Airport	Istanbul	68,346,784	64,106,014	6.6%	4,240,770
6.	0	Spain	Adolfo Suárez Madrid–Barajas Airport	Madrid	57,891,340	53,402,506	8.4%	4,488,834
7.	0	Spain	Barcelona–El Prat Josep Tarradellas Airport	Barcelona	50,172,457	47,284,500	6.1%	2,887,957
8.	1	Germany	Munich Airport	Munich	46,253,623	44,577,241	3.8%	1,676,382
9.	1	United Kingdom	Gatwick Airport	London	46,086,089	45,556,899	1.2%	529,190
10.	1	Russia	Sheremetyevo International Airport	Moscow	45,348,150	39,641,443	14.4%	5,706,707
11.	1	Italy	Leonardo da Vinci–Fiumicino Airport	Rome	42,995,119	40,971,881	4.9%	2,023,238
12.	0	France	Orly Airport	Paris	33,120,685	32,042,475	3.4%	1,078,210
13.	1	Ireland	Dublin Airport	Dublin	31,497,526	29,582,321	6.5%	1,915,205
14.	1	Switzerland	Zurich Airport	Zürich	31,113,488	29,396,094	5.8%	1,717,394
15.	1	Denmark	Copenhagen Airport	Copenhagen	30,298,531	29,177,833	3.8%	1,120,698
16.	3	Russia	Domodedovo International Airport	Moscow	29,403,704	30,657,854	4.1%	1,254,150
17.	0	Spain	Palma de Mallorca Airport	Palma de Mallorca	29,081,787	27,970,655	4.0%	1,111,132
18.	2	Portugal	Lisbon Airport	Lisbon	29,031,268	26,663,096	8.9%	2,368,172
19.	0	Norway	Oslo Airport	Oslo	28,518,584	27,482,486	3.8%	1,036,098
20.	2	United Kingdom	Manchester Airport	Manchester	28,292,797	27,826,054	1.7%	466,743
21.	1	United Kingdom	London Stansted Airport	London	27,996,116	25,904,450	8.1%	2,091,666
22.	3	Austria	Vienna International Airport	Vienna	27,037,292	24,392,805	10.8%	2,644,487
23.	2	Sweden	Stockholm Arlanda Airport	Stockholm	26,845,419	26,623,606	0.8%	221,813
24.	1	Belgium	Brussels Airport	Brussels	25,675,939	24,783,911	3.6%	892,028
25.	1	Italy	Malpensa Airport	Milan	24,725,490	22,169,167	11.5%	2,556,323
26.	2	Germany	Düsseldorf Airport	Düsseldorf	24,283,967	24,640,564	1.4%	356,597
27.	0	Greece	Athens International Airport	Athens	24,135,736	21,737,787	11.0%	2,397,949
28.	0	Germany	Berlin Tegel Airport	Berlin	22,000,430	20,460,688	7.5%	1,539,742
29.	2	Russia	Vnukovo International Airport	Moscow	21,478,486	18,138,865	18.4%	3,339,621
30.	1	Finland	Helsinki Airport	Helsinki	20,848,838	18,892,386	10.4%	1,956,452
31.	1	Spain	Málaga Airport	Málaga	19,021,704	18,628,876	2.1%	392,828
32.	2	Russia	Pulkovo Airport	Saint Petersburg	18,123,064	16,125,520	12.4%	1,997,544
33.	3	Poland	Warsaw Chopin Airport	Warsaw	17,755,542	15,730,330	12.9%	2,025,212
34.	1	Switzerland	Geneva Airport	Geneva	17,677,035	17,351,816	1.9%	325,219
35.	3	Germany	Hamburg Airport	Hamburg	17,234,229	17,622,997	2.2%	388,768
36.	1	Czech Republic	Václav Havel Airport Prague	Prague	16,797,006	15,415,001	9.0%	1,382,005
37.	2	United Kingdom	Luton Airport	London	16,769,634	15,990,276	4.9%	779,358
38.	3	Hungary	Budapest Ferenc Liszt International Airport	Budapest	14,867,491	13,097,239	13.5%	1,770,252
39.	0	United Kingdom	Edinburgh Airport	Edinburgh	14,294,305	13,410,343	6.6%	883,962
40.	2	Spain	Alicante–Elche Airport	Alicante/Elche	13,981,320	13,713,061	2.0%	268,259
41.	1	France	Nice Côte d'Azur Airport	Nice	13,850,561	13,304,782	4.1%	545,779
42.	2	Romania	Henri Coandă International Airport	Bucharest	13,820,428	12,804,191	7.9%	1,016,237
43.	2	Germany	Cologne Bonn Airport	Cologne/Bonn	12,957,828	12,384,223	4.6%	573,605
44.	2	Italy	Orio al Serio International Airport	Milan/Bergamo	12,938,572	12,336,137	4.9%	602,435
45.	2	Germany	Berlin Schönefeld Airport	Berlin	12,725,937	12,865,312	1.1%	139,375
46.	3	Ukraine	Boryspil International Airport	Kyiv	12,602,933	10,554,757	19.4%	2,048,176
47.	5	United Kingdom	Birmingham Airport	Birmingham	12,457,051	12,990,303	4.1%	533,252
48.	0	Portugal	Porto Airport	Porto	11,939,562	10,787,630	10.7%	1,151,932
49.	2	Germany	Stuttgart Airport	Stuttgart	11,798,090	10,962,247	7.6%	835,843
50.	0	Italy	Venice Marco Polo Airport	Venice	11,184,608	10,371,380	7.8%	813,228
51.	0	France	Lyon–Saint-Exupéry Airport	Lyon	11,037,413	10,280,192	7.4%	757,221
52.	3	Italy	Catania-Fontanarossa Airport	Catania	9,933,318	9,120,913	8.9%	812,405
53.	6	Italy	Naples Airport	Naples	9,932,029	8,577,507	15.8%	1,354,522
54.	3	Iceland	Keflavík International Airport	Reykjavík	9,804,388	8,755,352	12.0%	1,049,036
55.	3	United Kingdom	Glasgow Airport	Glasgow	9,656,227	9,897,959	2.4%	241,732
56.	2	France	Toulouse–Blagnac Airport	Toulouse	9,630,308	9,264,611	3.9%	365,697
57.	1	France	Marseille Provence Airport	Marseille	9,390,371	9,002,086	4.3%	388,285
58.	5	Italy	Linate Airport	Milan	9,233,475	9,548,363	3.3%	314,888
59.	1	United Kingdom	Bristol Airport	Bristol	8,699,529	8,239,250	5.6%	460,279
60.	2	Portugal	Faro Airport	Faro	8,685,571	8,727,132	0.5%	41,561
61.	2	France; Switzerland	EuroAirport Basel Mulhouse Freiburg	Basel/Mulhouse/Freiburg im Breisgau	8,578,064	7,888,840	8.7%	689,224
62.	1	Italy	Bologna Guglielmo Marconi Airport	Bologna	8,506,658	8,198,156	3.8%	308,502
63.	1	Spain	Ibiza Airport	Ibiza	8,104,316	7,903,892	2.5%	200,424
64.	0	Belgium	Brussels South Charleroi Airport	Charleroi	8,033,071	7,702,099	4.3%	330,972
65.	0	Greece	Heraklion International Airport	Heraklion	8,149,936	7,336,783	11.1%	813,153
66.	1	Spain	Valencia Airport	Valencia	7,769,867	6,745,394	15.2%	1,024,473
67.	5	Latvia	Riga International Airport	Riga	7,056,099	6,097,765	15.7%	958,334
68.	0	Bulgaria	Sofia Airport	Sofia	6,962,040	6,490,096	7.3%	471,944
69.	4	Malta	Malta International Airport	Malta	6,808,177	6,014,548	13.2%	793,629
70.	4	Sweden	Göteborg Landvetter Airport	Gothenburg	6,807,976	6,751,571	0.8%	56,405
71.	1	France	Bordeaux–Mérignac Airport	Bordeaux	6,799,572	6,223,414	9.3%	576,158
72.	5	Poland	Kraków John Paul II International Airport	Kraków	6,769,369	5,835,189	16.0%	934,180
73.	5	Italy	Falcone–Borsellino Airport	Palermo	6,628,558	5,775,274	14.8%	853,284
74.	5	Greece	Thessaloniki Airport "Macedonia"	Thessaloniki	6,403,396	6,327,174	1.2%	76,222
75.	11	Spain	Seville Airport	Seville	6,380,465	5,108,807	24.9%	1,271,658
76.	1	Germany	Langenhagen Airport	Hanover	6,324,634	5,870,104	7.7%	454,530
77.	6	Norway	Bergen Airport, Flesland	Bergen	6,306,623	6,113,452	3.2%	193,171
78.	2	United Kingdom	Belfast International Airport	Belfast	6,268,960	5,836,735	7.4%	432,225
79.	0	Netherlands	Eindhoven Airport	Eindhoven	6,237,755	5,701,220	9.4%	536,535
80.	0	France	Nantes Atlantique Airport	Nantes	6,199,181	5,489,087	12.9%	710,094
81.	7	Italy	Ciampino Airport	Rome	5,839,737	5,885,812	0.8%	46,075
82.	1	Serbia	Belgrade Nikola Tesla Airport	Belgrade	5,641,105	5,343,420	5.6%	297,685
83.	4	Spain	Bilbao Airport	Bilbao	5,469,453	4,973,712	10.0%	495,741
84.	1	Italy	Galileo Galilei Airport	Pisa	5,463,090	5,233,118	4.4%	229,972
85.	3	United Kingdom	Newcastle Airport	Newcastle upon Tyne	5,334,095	5,300,274	0.6%	33,821
86.	2	Greece	Rhodes International Airport	Rhodes	5,245,810	5,231,159	0.3%	14,651
87.	2	Ukraine	Simferopol International Airport	Simferopol	5,146,095	5,128,743	0.3%	17,352
88.	0	United Kingdom	Liverpool John Lennon Airport	Liverpool	5,046,995	4,901,157	3.0%	145,709
89.	1	Italy	Bari Airport	Bari	5,030,760	4,686,016	7.4%	344,744
90.	1	Poland	Gdańsk Lech Wałęsa Airport	Gdańsk	4,980,647	4,611,714	8.0%	368,933
91.	New entry	Lithuania	Vilnius Airport	Vilnius	4,922,949	3,761,837	30.9%	1,161,112
92.	3	United Kingdom	East Midlands Airport	Derby/Leicester/Nottingham	4,873,831	4,878,781	0.1%	4,950
93.	7	Poland	Katowice Airport	Katowice	4,838,149	3,892,941	24.3%	945,208
94.	2	United Kingdom	London City Airport	London	4,820,292	4,530,439	6.4%	289,853
95.	3	Belarus	Minsk National Airport	Minsk	4,536,618	4,114,512	10.3%	422,106
96.	2	Germany	Nuremberg Airport	Nuremberg	4,466,864	4,186,961	6.7%	279,903
97.	4	Norway	Trondheim Airport Værnes	Trondheim	4,441,791	4,428,897	0.3%	12,894
98.	1	Italy	Cagliari Elmas Airport	Cagliari	4,370,014	4,157,612	5.1%	212,402
99.	4	Norway	Stavanger Airport Sola	Stavanger	4,262,476	4,178,241	2.0%	84,235
100.	New entry	Russia	Krasnodar International Airport	Krasnodar	4,160,053	3,494,987	19.0%	665,066

== 2017 ==
Rank 2017	Rank change 2016–2017	Country	Airport	City served	Passengers 2017	Passengers 2016	Change % 2016–2017	Passengers change 2016–2017
1.	0	United Kingdom	Heathrow Airport	London	78,012,825	75,711,130	3.0%	2,301,695
2.	0	France	Charles de Gaulle Airport	Paris	69,471,442	65,933,145	5.4%	3,538,297
3.	0	Netherlands	Amsterdam Airport Schiphol	Amsterdam	68,515,425	63,625,534	7.7%	4,889,891
4.	0	Germany	Frankfurt am Main Airport	Frankfurt	64,500,386	60,786,937	6.1%	3,713,449
5.	0	Turkey	Istanbul Atatürk Airport	Istanbul	64,106,014	60,415,470	6.1%	3,690,544
6.	0	Spain	Adolfo Suárez Madrid–Barajas Airport	Madrid	53,402,506	50,420,583	5.9%	2,981,923
7.	0	Spain	Barcelona–El Prat Josep Tarradellas Airport	Barcelona	47,284,500	44,154,693	7.1%	3,129,807
8.	0	United Kingdom	Gatwick Airport	London	45,556,899	43,119,628	5.7%	2,437,271
9.	0	Germany	Munich Airport	Munich	44,577,241	42,261,309	5.5%	2,315,932
10.	0	Italy	Leonardo da Vinci–Fiumicino Airport	Rome	40,971,881	41,744,769	1.9%	772,888
11.	0	Russia	Sheremetyevo International Airport	Moscow	39,641,443	33,655,605	17.8%	5,985,838
12.	0	France	Orly Airport	Paris	32,042,475	31,237,865	2.6%	804,610
13.	1	Russia	Domodedovo International Airport	Moscow	30,657,854	28,500,259	7.6%	2,157,595
14.	1	Ireland	Dublin Airport	Dublin	29,582,321	27,907,384	6.0%	1,674,937
15.	1	Switzerland	Zurich Airport	Zürich	29,396,094	27,666,428	6.3%	1,729,666
16.	3	Denmark	Copenhagen Airport	Copenhagen	29,177,833	29,043,287	0.5%	134,546
17.	0	Spain	Palma de Mallorca Airport	Palma de Mallorca	27,970,655	26,253,882	6.5%	1,716,773
18.	1	United Kingdom	Manchester Airport	Manchester	27,773,303	25,637,054	8.3%	2,136,249
19.	1	Norway	Oslo Airport	Oslo	27,482,486	25,787,691	6.6%	1,694,795
20.	4	Portugal	Lisbon Airport	Lisbon	26,663,096	22,449,289	18.8%	4,213,807
21.	1	Sweden	Stockholm Arlanda Airport	Stockholm	26,623,606	24,682,466	7.9%	1,941,140
22.	1	United Kingdom	London Stansted Airport	London	25,904,450	24,320,071	6.5%	1,584,379
23.	2	Belgium	Brussels Airport	Brussels	24,783,911	21,818,418	13.6%	2,965,493
24.	2	Germany	Düsseldorf Airport	Düsseldorf	24,640,564	23,521,919	4.8%	1,118,645
25.	2	Austria	Vienna International Airport	Vienna	24,392,805	23,352,016	4.5%	1,040,789
26.	2	Italy	Malpensa Airport	Milan	22,169,167	19,420,690	14.2%	2,748,477
27.	0	Greece	Athens International Airport	Athens	21,737,787	20,017,530	8.6%	1,720,257
28.	2	Germany	Berlin Tegel Airport	Berlin	20,460,688	21,253,959	3.7%	793,271
29.	0	Finland	Helsinki Airport	Helsinki	18,892,386	17,184,681	9.9%	1,707,705
30.	0	Spain	Málaga Airport	Málaga	18,628,876	16,672,776	11.7%	1,956,100
31.	3	Russia	Vnukovo International Airport	Moscow	18,138,865	13,946,688	30.1%	4,192,177
32.	0	Germany	Hamburg Airport	Hamburg	17,622,997	16,224,154	8.6%	1,398,843
33.	2	Switzerland	Geneva Airport	Geneva	17,351,816	16,532,690	5.0%	819,126
34.	1	Russia	Pulkovo Airport	Saint Petersburg	16,125,520	13,265,037	21.6%	2,860,463
35.	2	United Kingdom	Luton Airport	London	15,799,219	14,551,774	8.6%	1,247,445
36.	1	Poland	Warsaw Chopin Airport	Warsaw	15,730,330	12,795,356	22.9%	2,934,974
37.	1	Czech Republic	Václav Havel Airport Prague	Prague	15,415,001	13,074,517	17.9%	2,340,484
38.	2	Spain	Alicante–Elche Airport	Alicante/Elche	13,713,061	12,344,945	11.1%	1,368,116
39.	0	United Kingdom	Edinburgh Airport	Edinburgh	13,410,658	12,348,425	8.6%	1,062,233
40.	2	France	Nice Côte d'Azur Airport	Nice	13,304,782	12,427,427	7.1%	877,355
41.	4	Hungary	Budapest Ferenc Liszt International Airport	Budapest	13,097,239	11,441,999	14.5%	1,655,240
42.	1	United Kingdom	Birmingham Airport	Birmingham	12,990,303	11,645,334	11.5%	1,344,969
43.	1	Germany	Berlin Schönefeld Airport	Berlin	12,865,312	11,652,922	10.4%	1,212,390
44.	2	Romania	Henri Coandă International Airport	Bucharest	12,804,191	10,982,967	16.6%	1,821,224
45.	4	Germany	Cologne Bonn Airport	Cologne/Bonn	12,384,223	11,910,138	4.0%	474,085
46.	1	Italy	Orio al Serio International Airport	Milan/Bergamo	12,336,137	11,159,631	10.5%	1,176,506
47.	1	Germany	Stuttgart Airport	Stuttgart	10,962,247	10,626,430	3.2%	335,817
48.	3	Portugal	Porto Airport	Porto	10,787,630	9,378,082	15.0%	1,409,548
49.	4	Ukraine	Boryspil International Airport	Kyiv	10,554,757	8,650,000	22.0%	1,904,757
50.	1	Italy	Venice Marco Polo Airport	Venice	10,371,380	9,624,748	7.8%	746,632
51.	1	France	Lyon–Saint-Exupéry Airport	Lyon	10,280,192	9,553,250	7.6%	726,942
52.	0	United Kingdom	Glasgow Airport	Glasgow	9,897,959	9,346,245	5.9%	551,714
53.	5	Italy	Linate Airport	Milan	9,548,363	9,682,264	1.4%	133,901
54.	1	France	Toulouse–Blagnac Airport	Toulouse	9,264,611	8,081,179	14.6%	1,183,432
55.	1	Italy	Catania-Fontanarossa Airport	Catania	9,120,913	7,914,117	15.2%	1,206,796
56.	2	France	Marseille Provence Airport	Marseille	9,002,086	8,475,809	6.2%	526,277
57.	6	Iceland	Keflavík International Airport	Reykjavík	8,755,352	6,821,358	28.4%	1,933,994
58.	0	Portugal	Faro Airport	Faro	8,727,132	7,630,909	14.4%	1,096,223
59.	5	Italy	Naples Airport	Naples	8,577,507	6,775,988	26.6%	1,801,519
60.	1	United Kingdom	Bristol Airport	Bristol	8,239,949	7,610,780	8.3%	629,169
61.	4	Italy	Bologna Guglielmo Marconi Airport	Bologna	8,198,156	7,680,992	6.7%	517,164
62.	2	Spain	Ibiza Airport	Ibiza	7,903,892	7,416,368	6.6%	487,524
63.	2	France; Switzerland	EuroAirport Basel Mulhouse Freiburg	Basel/Mulhouse/Freiburg im Breisgau	7,888,840	7,314,269	7.9%	574,571
64.	2	Belgium	Brussels South Charleroi Airport	Charleroi	7,702,099	7,304,800	5.4%	397,299
65.	0	Greece	Heraklion International Airport	Heraklion	7,336,783	6,742,746	8.8%	594,037
66.	0	Sweden	Göteborg Landvetter Airport	Gothenburg	6,751,571	6,369,396	6.0%	382,175
67.	1	Spain	Valencia Airport	Valencia	6,745,394	5,799,104	16.3%	946,290
68.	13	Bulgaria	Sofia Airport	Sofia	6,490,096	4,980,387	30.3%	1,509,709
69.	1	Greece	Thessaloniki Airport "Macedonia"	Thessaloniki	6,327,174	5,687,325	11.3%	639,849
70.	1	France	Bordeaux–Mérignac Airport	Bordeaux	6,223,414	5,779,569	7.7%	453,845
71.	4	Norway	Bergen Airport, Flesland	Bergen	6,113,452	5,949,060	2.8%	164,392
72.	0	Latvia	Riga International Airport	Riga	6,097,765	5,400,243	12.9%	697,522
73.	5	Malta	Malta International Airport	Malta	6,014,548	5,080,071	18.4%	934,477
74.	1	Italy	Ciampino Airport	Rome	5,885,812	5,395,699	9.1%	490,113
75.	4	Germany	Langenhagen Airport	Hanover	5,870,104	5,408,814	8.5%	461,290
76.	1	United Kingdom	Belfast International Airport	Belfast	5,836,735	5,147,546	13.4%	689,189
77.	3	Poland	Kraków John Paul II International Airport	Kraków	5,835,189	4,983,645	17.1%	851,544
78.	4	Italy	Falcone–Borsellino Airport	Palermo	5,775,274	5,325,559	8.4%	449,715
79.	5	Netherlands	Eindhoven Airport	Eindhoven	5,701,220	4,780,197	19.3%	921,023
80.	5	France	Nantes Atlantique Airport	Nantes	5,489,087	4,778,967	14.9%	710,120
81.	0	Serbia	Belgrade Nikola Tesla Airport	Belgrade	5,343,420	4,924,992	8.5%	418,428
82.	1	United Kingdom	Newcastle Airport	Newcastle upon Tyne	5,300,274	4,807,906	10.2%	492,368
83.	5	Italy	Galileo Galilei Airport	Pisa	5,233,118	4,989,496	4.9%	243,622
84.	2	Greece	Rhodes International Airport	Rhodes	5,231,159	4,942,386	5.8%	288,773
85.	10	Ukraine	Simferopol International Airport	Simferopol	5,201,690	5,128,743	1.4%	72,947
86.	2	Spain	San Pablo Airport	Seville	5,108,807	4,624,038	9.5%	484,769
87.	2	Spain	Bilbao Airport	Bilbao	4,973,712	4,588,265	8.4%	385,447
88.	2	United Kingdom	Liverpool John Lennon Airport	Liverpool	4,896,603	4,778,939	2.5%	117,664
89.	2	United Kingdom	East Midlands Airport	Derby/Leicester/Nottingham	4,878,781	4,653,818	4.8%	224,963
90.	2	Italy	Bari Airport	Bari	4,686,016	4,322,797	8.4%	363,219
91.	3	Poland	Gdańsk Lech Wałęsa Airport	Gdańsk	4,611,714	4,004,081	15.2%	607,633
92.	2	United Kingdom	London City Airport	London	4,530,439	4,538,813	0.2%	8,374
93.	2	Norway	Trondheim Airport Værnes	Trondheim	4,428,897	4,417,490	0.3%	11,407
94.	6	Germany	Nuremberg Airport	Nuremberg	4,186,961	3,485,372	20.1%	701,589
95.	2	Norway	Stavanger Airport Sola	Stavanger	4,178,241	4,193,665	0.4%	15,576
96.	0	Italy	Turin Airport	Turin	4,176,556	3,950,908	5.7%	225,648
97.	1	Italy	Cagliari Elmas Airport	Cagliari	4,157,612	3,695,045	12.5%	462,567
98.	New entry	Belarus	Minsk National Airport	Minsk	4,114,512	3,429,112	20.0%	685,400
99.	0	United Kingdom	Leeds Bradford Airport	Leeds	4,076,616	3,612,117	12.9%	464,499
100.	New entry	Poland	Katowice Airport	Katowice	3,892,941	3,221,261	21.8%	671,680

== 2016 ==
Rank 2016	Rank change 2015–2016	Country	Airport	City served	Passengers 2015	Passengers 2016	Change 2015–2016
1	Steady	United Kingdom	Heathrow Airport	London	74,985,475	75,711,130	▲1.0%
2	Steady	France	Charles de Gaulle Airport	Paris	65,766,986	65,933,145	▲0.3%
3	▲2	Netherlands	Amsterdam Airport Schiphol	Amsterdam	58,284,864	63,625,534	▲9.2%
4	Steady	Germany	Frankfurt Airport	Frankfurt	61,032,022	60,786,937	▼0.4%
5	▼2	Turkey	Istanbul Atatürk Airport	Istanbul	61,332,124	60,415,470	▼1.5%
6	Steady	Spain	Adolfo Suárez Madrid–Barajas Airport	Madrid	46,824,838	50,420,583	▲7.7%
7	▲3	Spain	Barcelona–El Prat Josep Tarradellas Airport	Barcelona	39,711,237	44,154,693	▲11.2%
8	▲1	United Kingdom	Gatwick Airport	London	40,269,087	43,119,628	▲7.1%
9	▼2	Germany	Munich Airport	Munich	40,981,522	42,261,309	▲3.1%
10	▼2	Italy	Leonardo da Vinci–Fiumicino Airport	Rome	40,463,208	41,744,769	▲3.2%
11	Steady	Russia	Sheremetyevo International Airport	Moscow	31,302,068	33,679,052	▲7.6%
12	▲1	France	Orly Airport	Paris	29,664,993	31,237,865	▲5.3%
13	▲1	Denmark	Copenhagen Airport	Copenhagen	26,610,332	29,043,287	▲9.1%
14	▼2	Russia	Domodedovo International Airport	Moscow	30,504,515	28,500,259	▼6.6%
15	▲1	Ireland	Dublin Airport	Dublin	25,049,319	27,907,384	▲11.4%
16	▼1	Switzerland	Zurich Airport	Zürich	26,281,228	27,666,428	▲5.3%
17	▲1	Spain	Palma de Mallorca Airport	Palma de Mallorca	23,745,023	26,253,882	▲10.6%
18	▼1	Norway	Oslo Airport	Oslo	24,678,195	25,787,691	▲4.5%
19	▲2	United Kingdom	Manchester Airport	Manchester	23,136,047	25,637,054	▲10.8%
20	Steady	Sweden	Stockholm Arlanda Airport	Stockholm	23,142,536	24,682,466	▲6.7%
21	▲2	United Kingdom	London Stansted Airport	London	22,519,178	24,320,071	▲8.0%
22	▲2	Germany	Düsseldorf Airport	Düsseldorf	22,476,685	23,521,919	▲4.7%
23	▼1	Austria	Vienna International Airport	Vienna	22,775,054<ref="Vienna"/>	23,352,016	▲2.5%
24	▲2	Portugal	Lisbon Airport	Lisbon	20,090,418	22,449,289	▲11.7%
25	▼6	Belgium	Brussels Airport	Brussels	23,460,018	21,818,418	▼7%
26	▼1	Germany	Berlin Tegel Airport	Berlin	21,005,196	21,253,959	▲1.2%
27	▲1	Greece	Athens International Airport	Athens	18,087,377	20,017,530	▲10.7%
28	▼1	Italy	Malpensa Airport	Milan	18,582,043	19,420,690	▲4.5%
29	Steady	Finland	Helsinki Airport	Helsinki	16,422,266	17,184,681	▲4.6%
30	▲3	Spain	Málaga Airport	Málaga	14,404,206	16,672,776	▲15.7%
31	Steady	Switzerland	Geneva Airport	Geneva	15,772,081	16,532,690	▲4.8%
32	Steady	Germany	Hamburg Airport	Hamburg	15,610,072	16,224,154	▲3.9%
33	▲2	United Kingdom	Luton Airport	London	12,263,505	14,551,774	▲18.5%
34	▼4	Russia	Vnukovo International Airport	Moscow	15,815,129	13,946,688	▼11.8%
35	▼1	Russia	Pulkovo Airport	Saint Petersburg	13,501,454	13,265,037	▼1.8%
36	Steady	Czech Republic	Václav Havel Airport Prague	Prague	12,030,928	13,074,517	▲8.7%
37	▲1	Poland	Warsaw Chopin Airport	Warsaw	11,186,688	12,795,356	▲14.4%
38	▼1	France	Nice Côte d'Azur Airport	Nice	12,016,730	12,427,427	▲3.4%
39	Steady	United Kingdom	Edinburgh Airport	Edinburgh	11,114,587	12,348,425	▲11.1%
40	▲1	Spain	Alicante–Elche Airport	Alicante/Elche	10,575,288	12,344,945	▲16.7%
41	▲2	Germany	Cologne Bonn Airport	Cologne / Bonn	10,338,375	11,910,138	▲15.2%
42	▲10	Germany	Berlin Schönefeld Airport	Berlin	8,526,268	11,652,922	▲36.7%
43	▲2	United Kingdom	Birmingham Airport	Birmingham	10,187,122	11,645,334	▲14.3%
44	Steady	Hungary	Budapest Ferenc Liszt International Airport	Budapest	10,298,963	11,441,999	▲11.1%
45	▼3	Italy	Orio al Serio International Airport	Milan/Bergamo	10,404,625	11,159,631	▲7.3%
46	▲1	Romania	Henri Coandă International Airport	Bucharest	9,274,629	10,982,967	▲18.3%
47	▼6	Germany	Stuttgart Airport	Stuttgart	10,512,225	10,626,430	▲1.1%
48	▼3	Italy	Linate Airport	Milan	9,689,635	9,682,264	▼0.1%
49	▼1	Italy	Venice Marco Polo Airport	Venice	8,751,028	9,624,748	▲10.0%
50	Steady	France	Lyon–Saint-Exupéry Airport	Lyon	8,703,354	9,553,250	▲9.8%
51	▲2	Portugal	Porto Airport	Porto	8,087,740	9,378,082	▲16.0%
52	▼3	United Kingdom	Glasgow Airport	Glasgow	8,714,154	9,346,245	▲7.3%
53	▲2	Ukraine	Boryspil International Airport	Kyiv	7,277,135	8,650,000	▲18.9%
54	▼2	France	Marseille Provence Airport	Marseille	8,261,804	8,475,809	▲2.6%
55	▼1	France	Toulouse–Blagnac Airport	Toulouse	7,669,054	8,081,179	▲5.4%
56	Steady	Italy	Catania-Fontanarossa Airport	Catania	7,105,487	7,914,117	▲11.4%
57	▲2	Italy	Bologna Guglielmo Marconi Airport	Bologna	6,889,742	7,680,992	▲11.5%
58	▲4	Portugal	Faro Airport	Faro	6,436,881	7,630,909	▲18.5%
59	▲1	United Kingdom	Bristol Airport	Bristol	6,786,790	7,610,780	▲12.1%
60	▲1	Spain	Ibiza Airport	Ibiza	6,477,283	7,416,368	▲14.5%
61	▼4	France; Switzerland; Germany	EuroAirport Basel Mulhouse Freiburg	Basel / Mulhouse / Freiburg im Breisgau	7,061,059	7,314,269	▲3.6%
62	▼4	Belgium	Brussels South Charleroi Airport	Charleroi	6,957,596	7,304,800	▲5.0%
63	▲15	Iceland	Keflavík International Airport	Reykjavík	4,855,505	6,821,358	▲40.5%
64	▼1	Italy	Naples Airport	Naples	6,163,188	6,775,988	▲9.9%
65	▲1	Greece	Heraklion International Airport	Heraklion	6,057,355	6,742,746	▲11.3%
66	▼4	Sweden	Göteborg Landvetter Airport	Gothenburg	6,158,334	6,369,396	▲3.4%
67	▼2	Norway	Bergen Airport, Flesland	Bergen	6,020,866	5,949,060	▼1.2%
68	▲4	Spain	Valencia Airport	Valencia	5,055,127	5,799,104	▲14.7%
69	▲1	France	Bordeaux–Mérignac Airport	Bordeaux	5,323,294	5,779,569	▲8.6%
70	▼2	Greece	Thessaloniki International Airport, "Macedonia"	Thessaloniki	5,341,293	5,687,325	▲6.5%
71	▼5	Germany	Langenhagen Airport	Hanover	5,452,669	5,408,814	▼0.8%
72	▼2	Latvia	Riga International Airport	Riga	5,162,149	5,400,243	▲4.6%
73	▼8	Italy	Rome Ciampino Airport	Rome	5,834,201	5,395,699	▼7.5%
74	Steady	Italy	Falcone–Borsellino Airport	Palermo	4,910,791	5,325,559	▲8.4%
75	▼4	Ukraine	Simferopol International Airport	Simferopol	5,017,758	5,201,690	▲3.7%
76	▲7	United Kingdom	Belfast International Airport	Belfast	4,391,292	5,147,546	▲17.2%
77	Steady	Malta	Malta International Airport	Malta	4,618,642	5,080,071	▲10.0%
78	▼3	Italy	Galileo Galilei Airport	Pisa	4,804,774	4,989,496	▲3.8%
79	▲12	Poland	John Paul II International Airport Kraków–Balice	Kraków	4,221,171	4,983,645	▲18.1%
80	▲13	Bulgaria	Sofia Airport	Sofia	4,088,943	4,980,387	▲21,8%
81	▼3	Greece	Rhodes International Airport	Rhodes	4,579,023	4,942,386	▲7.9%
82	▼6	Serbia	Belgrade Nikola Tesla Airport	Belgrade	4,776,110	4,924,992	▲3.1%
83	▼4	United Kingdom	Newcastle Airport	Newcastle upon Tyne	4,562,846	4,807,906	▲5.4%
84	▲1	Netherlands	Eindhoven Airport	Eindhoven	4,373,882	4,780,197	▲9.3%
85	▼3	France	Nantes Atlantique Airport	Nantes	4,394,996	4,778,967	▲8.7%
86	▲4	United Kingdom	Liverpool John Lennon Airport	Liverpool	4,301,495	4,778,939	▲11.1%
87	▼6	United Kingdom	East Midlands Airport	Derby / Leicester / Nottingham	4,450,862	4,653,818	▲4.6%
88	Steady	Spain	San Pablo Airport	Seville	4,308,845	4,624,038	▲7.3%
89	▲1	Spain	Bilbao Airport	Bilbao	4,277,725	4,588,265	▲7.3%
90	▼3	United Kingdom	London City Airport	London	4,319,301	4,538,913	▲5.1%
91	▼7	Norway	Trondheim Airport	Trondheim	4,352,721	4,417,490	▲1.5%
92	▲3	Italy	Bari Airport	Bari	3,972,105	4,322,797	▲8.8%
93	▼13	Norway	Stavanger Airport	Stavanger	4,499,482	4,193,665	▼6.8%
94		Poland	Gdańsk Lech Wałęsa Airport	Gdańsk	3,706,180	4,004,081	▲8.0%
95	▼9	France	Beauvais Airport	Beauvais	4,330,013	3,997,856	▼7.7%
96		Italy	Turin Airport	Turin	3,659,312	3,943,298	▲7.8%
97		Lithuania	Vilnius Airport	Vilnius	3,814,001	3,934,891	▲3.2%
98		Italy	Cagliari Airport	Cagliari	3,714,174	3,689,747	▼0.7%
99		United Kingdom	Leeds Bradford Airport	Leeds	3,446,831	3,612,061	▲4.8%
100		Germany	Nuremberg Airport	Nuremberg	3,381,681	3,485,372	▲3.1%

== See also ==
- Busiest airports by continent
- List of busiest airports by aircraft movements
- List of busiest airports by cargo traffic
- List of busiest airports by international passenger traffic
- List of busiest airports by passenger traffic
- List of busiest city airport systems by passenger traffic
- List of the busiest airports in the Baltic states
- List of the busiest airports in the European Union
- List of the busiest airports in the former Soviet Union
- List of the busiest airports in the Nordic countries
- List of the busiest airports in the Middle East
- List of busiest passenger flight routes

=== Busiest airports by country ===
- List of the busiest airports in Argentina
- List of the busiest airports in Australia
- List of the busiest airports in Brazil
- List of the busiest airports in Canada
- List of the busiest airports in China
- List of the busiest airports in Croatia
- List of the busiest airports in France
- List of the busiest airports in Germany
- List of the busiest airports in Greece
- List of busiest airports in India
- List of the busiest airports in Indonesia
- List of the busiest airports in Iran
- List of the busiest airports in the Republic of Ireland
- List of the busiest airports in Italy
- List of the busiest airports in Japan
- List of the busiest airports in New Zealand
- List of the busiest airports in Poland
- List of the busiest airports in Portugal
- List of the busiest airports in Romania
- List of the busiest airports in Russia
- List of the busiest airports in South Korea
- List of the busiest airports in Spain

List of the busiest airports in Switzerland

- List of the busiest airports in Turkey
- List of the busiest airports in Ukraine
- List of busiest airports in the United Kingdom
- List of the busiest airports in the United States
