= Movement Coordination Centre Europe =

Multi-national European coordinating body for military air lift and surface movement

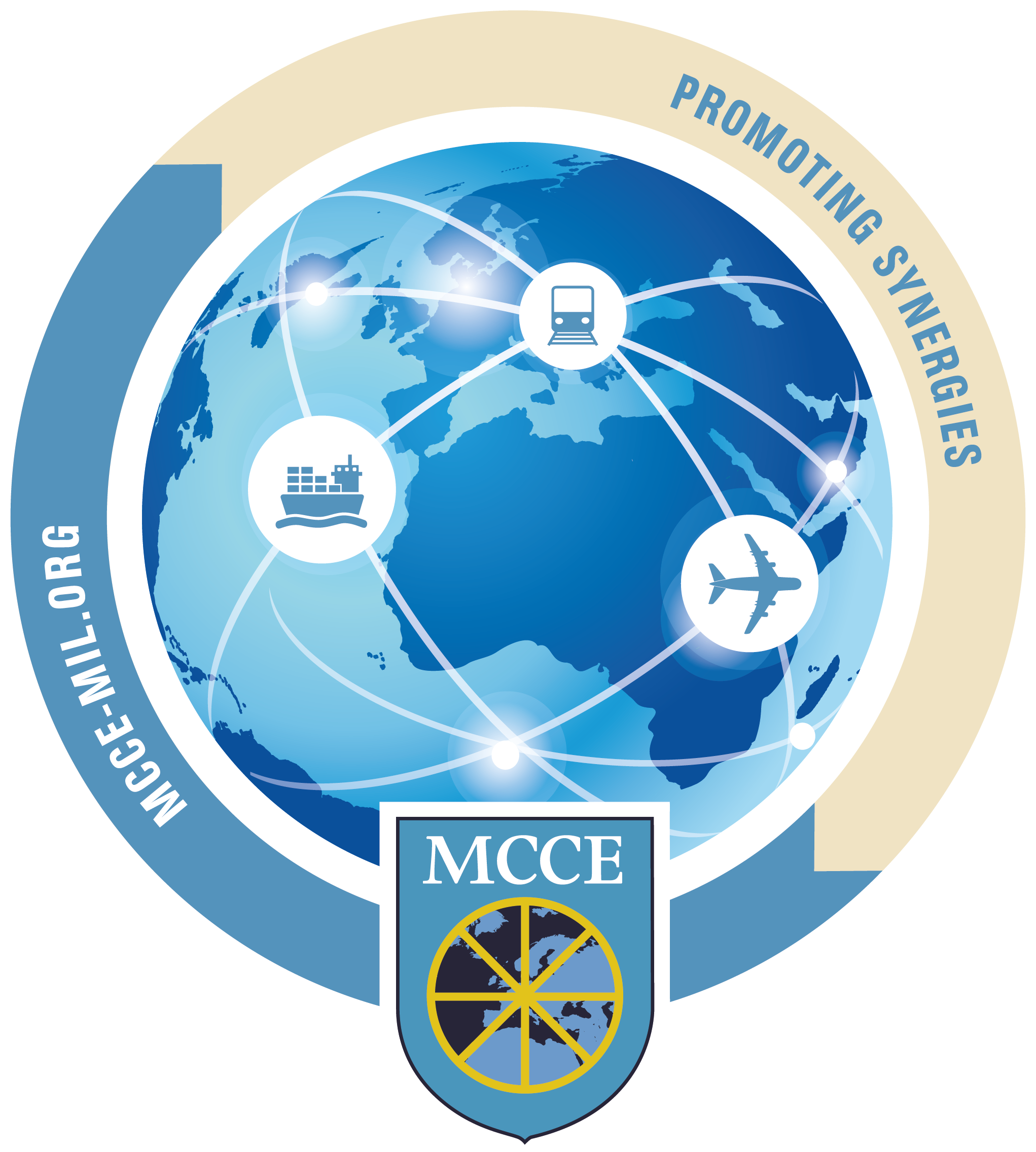
MCCE Logo

The Movement Coordination Centre Europe (MCCE) is a multinational military movement brokerage centre located on the Eindhoven Airbase at Eindhoven Airport in the Netherlands. Its 30 Participating Nations are predominantly drawn from NATO and the European Union (EU) but also has nations outside of Europe and outside of NATO. The centre is staffed by military and civilian personnel from the participating countries. The main purpose of the MCCE is coordinating and optimising the usage of military and charter airlift, sealift and land movement assets of the armed forces of the member countries.

== History ==
The genesis of the MCCE began in 1999 when the EU and NATO identified shortfalls in military capability as the world emerged from a cold war environment into a more dynamic expeditionary operational era. The two main findings that led to the founding of the MCCE were a shortage of both strategic airlift and sealift capabilities and the absence of a coordinating body to optimise strategic lift efficiency. At the same time, projects were created to generate additional capacity: Strategic Airlift Capability (SAC) and Strategic Air Lift International Solution (SALIS) (its centre is co-located in the MCCE) for airlift, and Multinational Sealift Steering Committee (MSCC) for sealift.

The MCCE was officially established on 1 July 2007 as the merger of the earlier European Airlift Coordination Cell (EACC) and the Sealift Coordination Centre (SCC). On this date, the initial 15 signatory countries became official members. The MCCE has since been through several cycles of expansion.

== Participating Nations ==
MCCE is an independent non-NATO / non-EU military organization. MCCE is open to all governments whose membership is unanimously accepted by all the other Participant Nations, regulated by a Technical Arrangement. Decisions are taken unanimously with each member having one vote.

MCCE is structured in member nations (Participating Nations), associated nations (Third Party Nations) and affiliated Organisations.

Membership by joining date
Date	Country	Note
June 2007	Belgium; Canada; Denmark; France; Germany; Hungary; Italy; Latvia; Netherlands; Norway; Slovenia; Spain; Sweden; Turkey; United Kingdom	Founding Members
Autumn 2007	Estonia; Finland; Luxembourg	First Expansion
2008	Poland; Romania; United States	Second Expansion
2010	Austria; Czech Republic; Portugal	Third Expansion
2011	Croatia	Fourth Expansion
2015	Lithuania; Slovakia	Fifth Expansion
2017	Bulgaria	Sixth Expansion
2023	Australia	Seventh Expansion
2024	New Zealand	Eighth Expansion
2026	Japan	Third Party Nation

== Mission ==
2026 MCCE Network diagram

MCCE aims to provide for its participating nations the most effective coordination of multinational and multimodal strategic lift requirements and air-to-air refuelling against opportunities, in order to maximize the most efficient use of resources, thereby increasing the confidence and visibility of strategic movement plans.

MCCE has to be prepared to provide coordination support to EU and/or NATO operations, and to identify and highlight any potential to optimise participants’ use of air transport, air-to-air refuelling, sea transport, and inland surface transport. This will include the provision of advice for the common usage of commercial charter capabilities, to avoid unnecessary competition for the same resources resulting in increased charter costs.

The MCCE, staffed 24/7, acts as a catalyser for strategic lift coordination. Its focus is mainly on strategic movements, but does not exclude operational and tactical movements. For its members, it aims to avoid wasted capacity on missions, to improve joint capabilities and precise, multi-modal plans.

MCCE also must be prepared to provide coordination support to operations of organisations such as the UN to improve efficiency and to provide cost saving alternatives for member nations through identifying available assets, advertising these assets, and then coordinating their use to the maximum extent possible. This coordination support will include requests for support to Peace Support Operations, Disaster Relief and Civil emergency crises. All collaborated movements operate in a reciprocal arrangement which includes cashless compensation for services through the ATARES “Air Transport & Air-to-Air Refuelling and other Exchanges of Services” and SEOS “Surface Exchange of Services” tools that enhance cooperation by easing the reimbursement process and providing the ability to plan quicker and faster.

=== Operating concept ===
The MCCE’s operating concept works as follows: Nation A has a requirement to transport 90 widgets from point X to point Z by a desired delivery date. The requirement is submitted to the MCCE, and the operational cells will issue the request to all of the member nations. In return, the member nations will submit offers based on their strategic availability and assets to support the request. Nation A selects Nation B, based on nation B being able to fulfil nation A’s requirement in the most beneficial way. Both nations reach an agreement on the specified compensation to be exchanged for the service provided. This can be either in funds paid or an exchange of debits and credits for services rendered. These debits and credits are accrued or reduced based on the mission, distance, cargo, and mode of the movement. Nation B then completes the mission, gaining the agreed upon credit while nation A incurs the debit upon acceptance and completion of mission.

== Organisation ==
=== Governance ===
The MCCE Steering Board (SB) is the highest decision-making body of the MCCE. This Board decides on MCCE participating issues, sets policy guidance, discuses issues recommended by the WB and appoints the Director. This Board is supported by the MCCE Working Board (WB). The WB discusses and controls the routine business related to the MCCE. Every signing Nation has a representative in each of the Boards.

The Director of the MCCE is appointed by the MCCE SB. He manages and directs the MCCE staff in accordance with the Terms of References (TOR’s) and policy set by the MCCE SB.

=== MCCE Steering Board ===
The MCCE Steering Board (SB) is the highest decision making body of the MCCE. It consists of a representative from each of the participating nations, normally at the rank of OF 6 or higher. The Chairman of the SB (CM SB) is a representative of a Participant and is appointed by a decision of the SB and is appointed in general for a period of 2 years.

The SB meets annually and is responsible for:

- Deciding on MCCE participation/membership issues;

- Setting Policy guidance;

- Discussing issues recommended by the MCCE Working Board (WB);

- Deciding on proposals for modifications of the TA as compiled by the Working Board; and

- Appointing the MCCE Director.

=== MCCE Working Board ===
The MCCE Working Board (WB) decides and controls Routine Business related issues. It consists of a representative from each of the participating nations. The WB meets at least every 6 months to enable it to carry out its responsibilities effectively. The Chairman of the WB (CM WB) is a representative of a Participant and is appointed by a decision of the WB. Decisions, including Ex-Committee Decisions, by the WB are taken unanimously. The CM of the MCCE WB will be appointed in general for a period of 2 years.

The WB is responsible for:

- General policy decisions;

- Providing direction for the operations of the MCCE;

- Taking decisions related to the staff structure, establishment and Job Descriptions of the MCCE, as well as the Rotation and Flagging of positions;

- Approving the budget and other financial decisions;

- Issuing Key Performance Indicators (KPIs) to MCCE and evaluating and reviewing the performance of the MCCE against these criteria.

MCCE Standing Advisory Working Group

The MCCE Standing Advisory Working Group (SAWG) was formed to investigate and provide advice on matters of relevance to the MCCE Working Board (WB) and the MCCE Steering Board (SB). The MCCE Directorate may also request support from the SAWG, but it must first obtain WB or SB approval to task the SAWG as appropriate.

=== Directors ===
Name	Country	Period
Col Erik van de Ven	Netherlands	2025-Present
Col Gioacchino Cassarà	Italy	2022-2025
GpCpt Stuart Gregory	United Kingdom	2019-2022
Col Eric Herbaut	France	2018-2019
Col Franck Verdierre	France	2016-2018
Col Reinhard Krell	Germany	2013-2016
Col Christian Schmidt	Denmark	2010-2013
Col Freek van der Vaart	Netherlands	2008-2010
Capt (N) Gunnar Borch	Norway	2007-2008
Col Wolfgang Lange (EACC Director)	Germany	2005-2007
Col Philip Rutz (EACC Director)	France	2003-2005

=== Organisational Chart ===
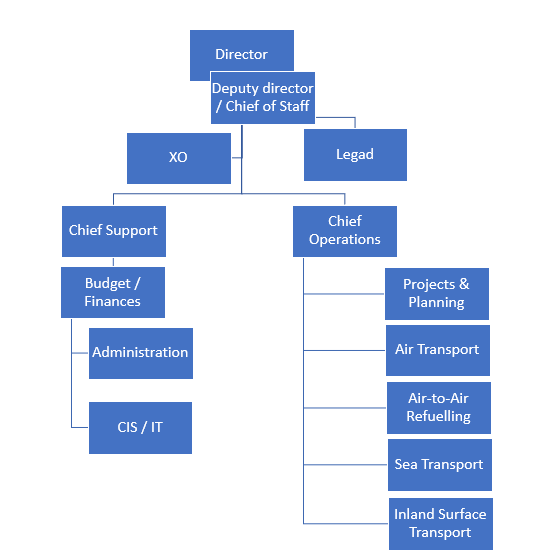

== See also ==
- Eindhoven Airport
- Heavy Airlift Wing
- European Defence Agency
- European Air Group
- European Air Transport Command
