= Eindhoven Airport =

Airport in Eindhoven, Netherlands

Eindhoven Airport Eindhoven Air Base Luchthaven Eindhoven Vliegbasis Eindhoven

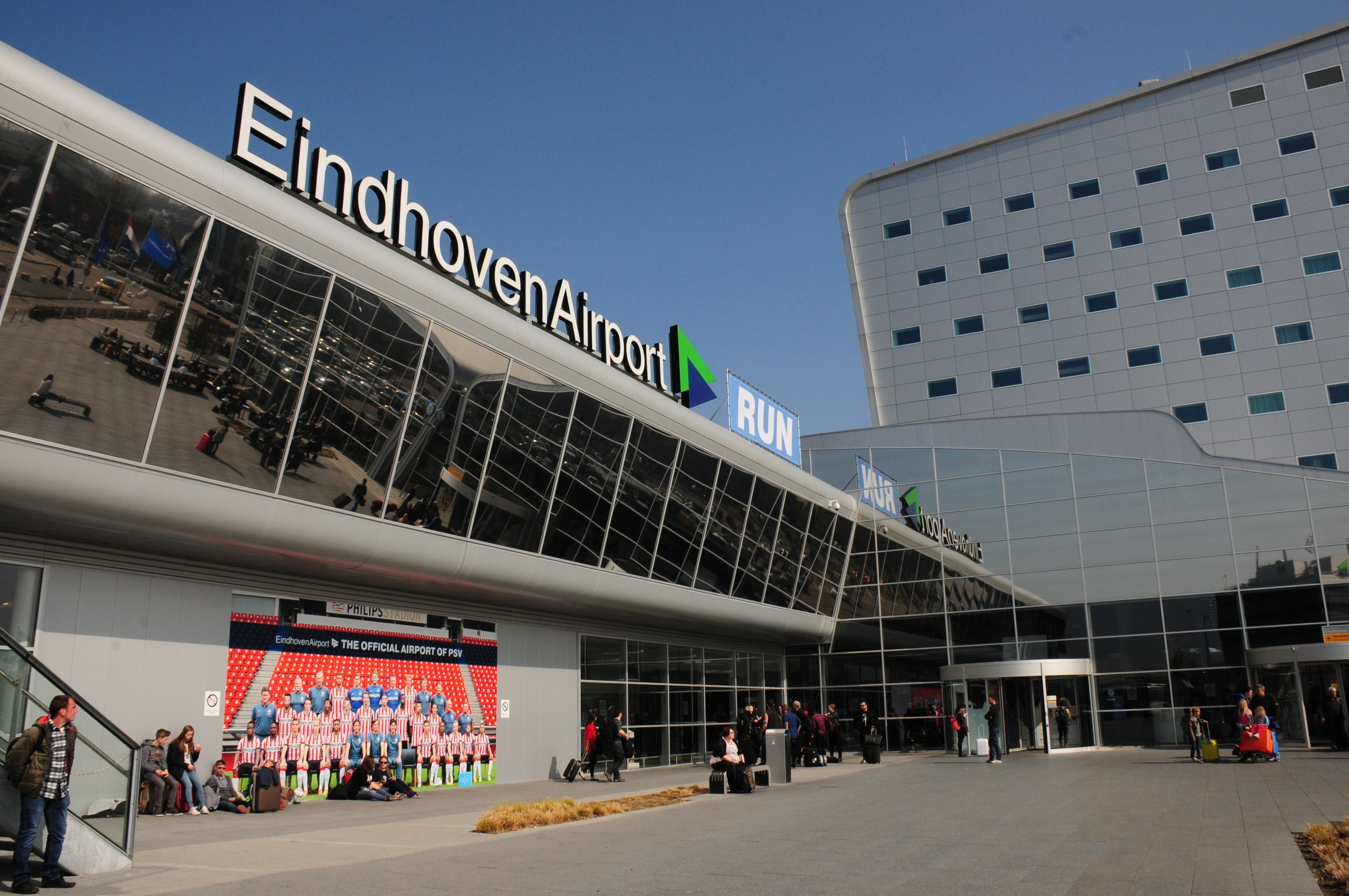
- IATA: EIN; ICAO: EHEH

Summary
- Airport type: Public / Military
- Owner: Schiphol Group (51%); North Brabant (24.5%); Eindhoven (24.5%)
- Operator: Eindhoven Airport N.V.; RNLASF Vliegbasis Eindhoven
- Serves: Eindhoven, Netherlands
- Focus city for: Transavia; TUI fly Netherlands
- Elevation AMSL: 74 ft (23 m)
- Coordinates: 51°27′00″N 005°22′28″E
- Website: eindhovenairport.nl/en

Map
- Location of Eindhoven Airport

Runways
Direction	Length		Surface
Direction	m	ft	Surface
03/21	3,000	9,842	Tarmac

Statistics (2023)
- Passengers: 6,800,000 ▲7,9%
- Aircraft movements: 41.496 ▲3.1%
- Source: AIP from AIS the Netherlands, Eindhoven Airport News

Eindhoven Airport (IATA: EIN, ICAO: EHEH) is an international airport located 7.6 km (4.7 mi) west of Eindhoven, Netherlands. By number of passengers, it is the second largest airport in the Netherlands, with 6.96 million passengers in 2025. The airport is used by both civilian and military traffic.

== History ==
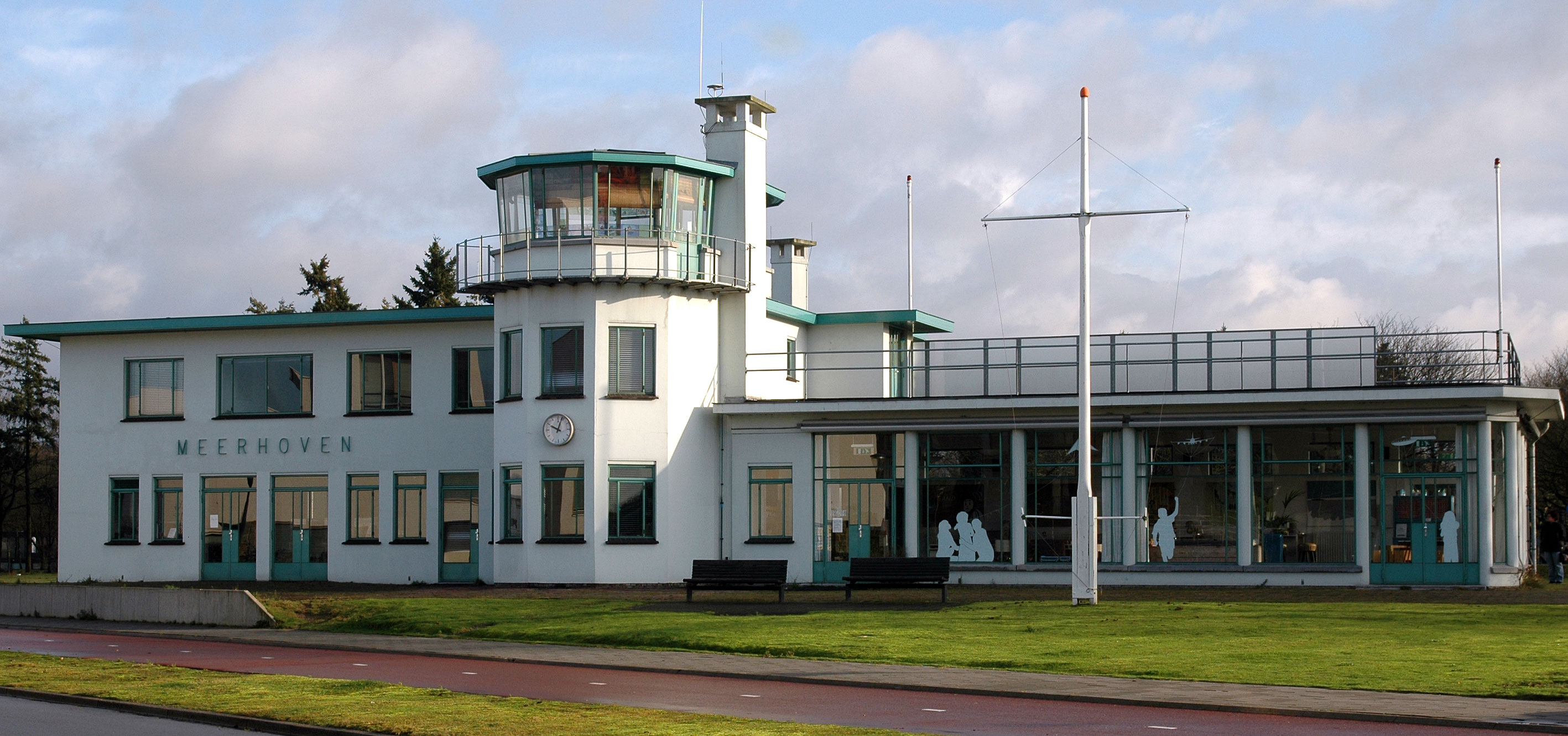
The former airport building

=== Early years ===
The airport was established in 1932 as a grass strip under the name Vliegveld Welschap (Welschap Airfield). In 1939, the airfield was acquired for use by the Air Force, as concerns over a military conflict with Germany increased. The airfield was quickly captured by German forces during the Battle of the Netherlands and re-used by them under the name Fliegerhorst Eindhoven.

The airfield was returned to the Royal Netherlands Air Force in 1952. It was home to crews flying the Republic F-84 Thunderjet, Republic F-84F Thunderstreak, Northrop NF-5A/B, and finally the General Dynamics F-16A/B Fighting Falcon. 316 Squadron flew the F-16 and was inactivated in April 1994.

=== Development since the 1980s ===
In 1984, a terminal building for civilian air traffic was constructed, based on a Leo de Bever design.

On 15 July 1996, a Belgian Air Force C-130H Hercules crashed at the airport – known as the "Hercules disaster" (Herculesramp). The plane caught fire and 34 people died in the intense heat. Communication problems within the emergency services meant that fire services were not aware the C-130 carried many passengers, which likely caused more deaths.

On the civilian side, the airport has continued to grow and is now the second-largest airport in the Netherlands. To accommodate this, in early 2012 work to expand Eindhoven airport was started including the addition of a 120-room Tulip Inn hotel.

In October 2018, Ryanair announced it would be closing its base at the airport in November. A 180-room Holiday Inn hotel opened in 2019.

In 2021, the airport announced a terminal extension will be built from 2025, expanding the terminal from 27,300 to 35,000 m^{2} (294,000 to 377,000 sq ft).

== Facilities ==
Passenger facilities include: exchange office, lost property office, luggage lockers, baby changing area, health centre, and various shops such as Rituals, AH to GO, Victoria's Secret, and tax free shops: Travel Plaza and Travel luxury; and also a new Business Lounge: Aspire by Swissport Eindhoven Airport also has a variety of restaurants, bars and cafes, such as: Upstairs (the Tulip Inn Hotel bar), La Place, The Bar (a flagship of Bavaria beer), McDonalds and Starbucks (both before and after the security check).

The airport also has a business centre. There are 1,500 parking spaces for long and short term parking.

== Military ==
- 334 Squadron with Airbus A330 MRTT & Gulfstream G650ER
- 336 Squadron with Lockheed C-130H Hercules
- 940 Maintenance Support Squadron
- 941 Miscellaneous Support Squadron
- Movement Coordination Centre Europe
- European Air Transport Command

From 1 July 2007, Eindhoven has been the location of the Movement Coordination Centre Europe (MCCE), a merger of the former European Airlift Centre (EAC), established by the European Air Group, and the Sea-lift Coordination Centre (SCC). MCCE is a non-NATO/non-European military organization. MCCE is an organization open to all governments whose membership is accepted by all the other participant nations, regulated by a specific legal technical agreement. The mission of the MCCE is to coordinate the use of air transport, surface transport (sea and land) and air-to-air refuelling (AAR) capabilities between participating nations, and thereby improve the overall efficiency of the use of owned or leased assets of the national military organizations. The centre's main focus will be on strategic movements, but not exclude operational and tactical movements.

Since September 2010, Eindhoven Airport has hosted the European Air Transport Command, made up of seven European nations which share aerial military assets in a single operative command. EATC will play a leading role in the A400M standardization process.

== Airlines and destinations ==
The following airlines operate regular scheduled and charter flights to and from Eindhoven:

Airlines	Destinations
Pegasus Airlines	Istanbul–Sabiha Gökçen
Ryanair	Alicante, Barcelona, Bergamo, Bologna, Bratislava, Brindisi, Catania, Faro, Fez, Kraków, Lisbon, Madrid, Málaga, Manchester, Marrakesh, Marseille, Palma de Mallorca, Pisa, Porto, Rome–Fiumicino, Seville, Sofia, Tirana, Treviso, Valencia, Vienna, Vilnius, Warsaw–Modlin, Zagreb
SunExpress	Seasonal: Izmir
Transavia	Alicante, Barcelona, Ibiza, Málaga, Prague, Tenerife–South Valencia, Seasonal: Bordeaux, Innsbruck, Kos, Rhodes, Salzburg
TUI fly Belgium	Nador, Oujda
TUI fly Netherlands	Gran Canaria, Hurghada, Sharm El Sheikh; Seasonal: Antalya, Heraklion, Kos, Rhodes, Tenerife–South
Wizz Air	Belgrade, Bucharest–Otopeni, Budapest, Cluj-Napoca, Debrecen, Gdańsk, Iași, Katowice, Kraków, Skopje, Sofia, Tirana, Varna, Vilnius, Warsaw–Chopin, Wrocław

== Statistics ==
Busiest coutes from Eindhoven Airport (2024)
Rank	Airport	Passengers 2024
1	Málaga, Spain	359,530
2	London-Stansted, United Kingdom	344,075
3	Alicante, Spain	340,774
4	Faro, Portugal	257,567
5	Budapest, Hungary	256,937
6	Valencia, Spain	253,044
7	Rome-Fiumicino, Italy	213,430
8	Kraków, Poland	211,902
9	Sofia, Bulgaria	209,699
10	Bergamo, Italy	172,731
11	Barcelona, Spain	170,540
12	Lisbon, Portugal	165,149
13	Palma de Mallorca, Spain	161,013
14	Ibiza, Spain	155,242
15	Bucharest-Henri Coandă, Romania	149,786
16	Warsaw-Chopin, Poland	147,202
17	Gdańsk, Poland	133,080
18	Tirana, Albania	132,545
19	Katowice, Poland	120,445
20	Porto, Portugal	120,002

== Ground transport ==
Eindhoven Airport is located just off the A2 motorway. The airport is also served by multiple bus services:

- Bravo Line operate local and regional bus services.
- KLM Bus connects Eindhoven Airport to Amsterdam Airport Schiphol
- Flixbus connects the airport to Paris, Brussels, Antwerp and Amsterdam.

== See also ==
- Transport in the Netherlands
- List of airports in the Netherlands
