= Spata-Artemida =

Spata-Artemida Σπάτα-Αρτέμιδα
- Municipality
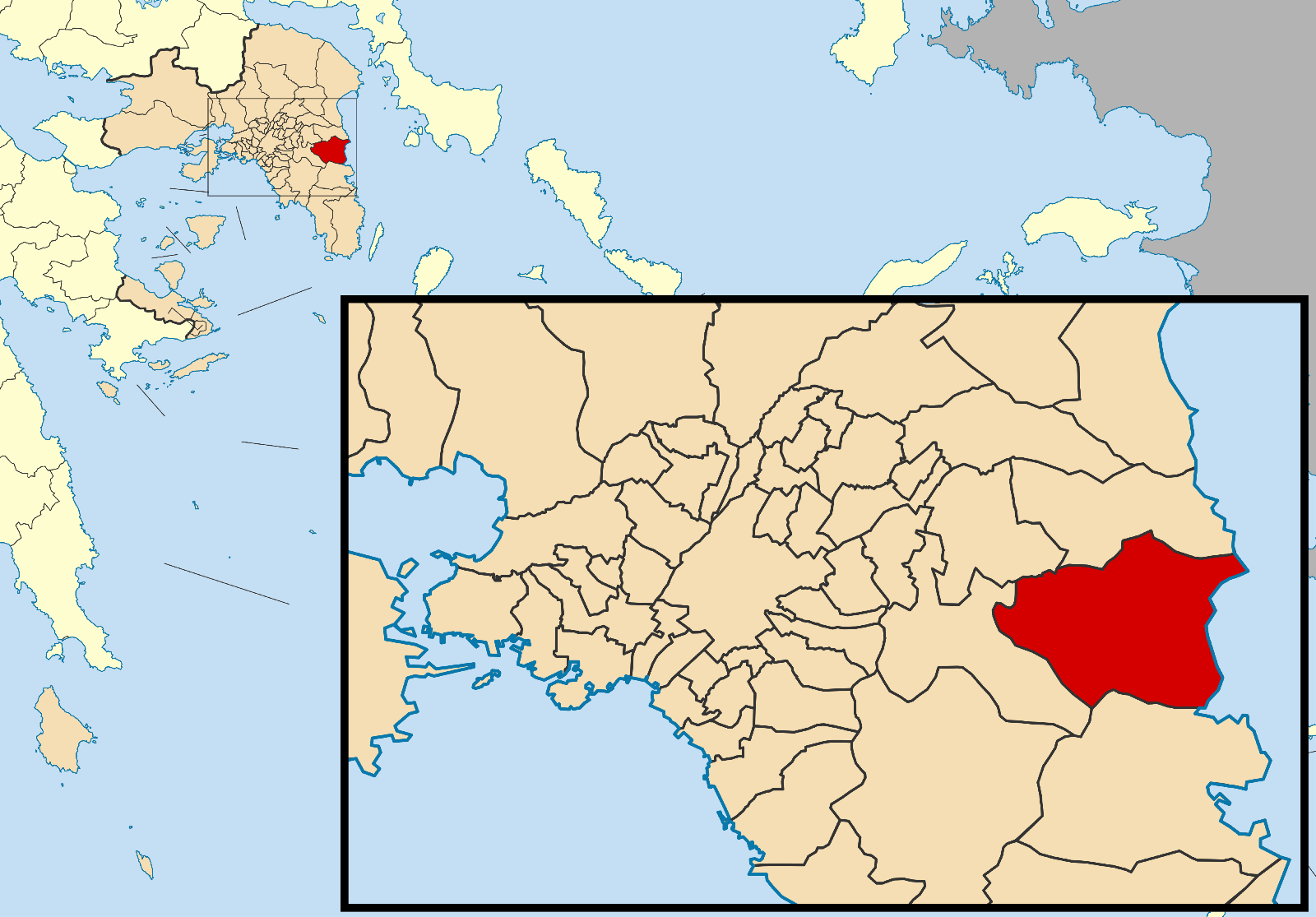

- Location within Greece
- Coordinates: 37°58′N 23°55′E
- Country: Greece
- Administrative region: Attica
- Regional unit: East Attica
- Seat: Spata

Government
  - Mayor: Dimitrios Markou (since 2014)

Area
  - Municipality: 73.695 km^{2} (28.454 sq mi)

Population (2021)
  - Municipality: 34,915
  - Density: 473.78/km^{2} (1,227.1/sq mi)
- Time zone: UTC+2 (EET)
  - Summer (DST): UTC+3 (EEST)
- Website: spata-artemis.gr

Spata-Artemida (Greek: Σπάτα-Αρτέμιδα) is a municipality in the East Attica regional unit, Attica, Greece. The seat of the municipality is the town Spata. The municipality has an area of 73.695 km^{2}.

== Municipality ==
The municipality Spata–Artemida was formed at the 2011 local government reform by the merger of the following 2 former municipalities, that became municipal units:

- Artemida
- Spata-Loutsa

== Economy ==
Olympic Air has its headquarters at Athens International Airport in Spata. Goody's S.A., a Greek fast food company, is also headquartered at the airport.

== Government and infrastructure ==
The Air Accident Investigation and Aviation Safety Board has an office at the airport.
