= Vivartia =

Greek food production conglomerate brand

Vivartia Holding S.A.
- Type: S.A
- Industry: Food and beverage
- Founded: 1968; 58 years ago
- Headquarters: Spata, Greece
- Area served: Europe, Central and North America
- Key people: Panagiotis Throuvalas (Chairman); Athanasios Papanicolaou (CEO)
- Revenue: 591.919 million € (2021)
- Operating income: (926) thousand € (2021)
- Net income: 331 thousand € (2021)
- Owner: CVC Capital Partners (92.1%)
- Number of employees: 5,127 (2021)
- Subsidiaries: DELTA
- Website: www.vivartia.com

Vivartia Holding S.A. (Greek: Vivartia Συμμετοχών Α.Ε.) is a food production conglomerate brand in Greece. Its head office is in Spata, Attica.

Vivartia was formed by the merger of Delta Holding S.A. and Mechelany International S.A. This merger was the result of a process led by Justin Jenk, the then CEO of Delta Holding, Spyridon Theodoropoulos, majority shareholder of Chipita and Dimitris Daskalopoulos, majority shareholder of Delta. The merged entity became the largest food group in Greece. The merger was the culmination of a highly successful turnaround and improvement strategy put in place by Jenk in 2003. The major shareholder of Vivartia was the Daskalopoulos family until a 76.89% share was sold to the Marfin Investment Group.

Today, Vivartia has 27 facilities, 13,500 employees, a commercial presence in 30 states and an estimated turnover of 1.3 billion euros for 2006.

Chipita was sold to Spyros Theodoropoulos and Saudi Olayan Group in 2010.

== History ==
Vivartia is the result of the merger of Delta Holding S.A., which included Delta Dairy Products, Goody's, Flocafé and Mechelany foods as well as a dozen other major Greek food and beverages related corporations of the nutritions field, with the snack and bakery business lines of Chipita. Its transition deal name was “Brand Co” and was officially changed to Vivartia in May 2006 when the merger was completed. It created the largest food group in Greece, one of the top ten companies in Greece and the 35th largest food group in Europe. The merger was voted "Deal of the Year 2006". After the merger was complete, the company changed its name to Vivartia S.A.

During the next 18 months the transformation strategy was completed with further acquisitions, disposals and restructurings. Jenk left Vivartia in 2006 and Daskalopoulos in 2007, when the majority of Vivartia's share were acquired by Marfin Investment Group.

It now consists of various divisions aimed at different aspects of the field. These are:

- Dairy & Beverages Division (formerly Delta)
- Frozen Foods Division (Barba-Stathis)
- Catering Services & Entertainment Division (Goody's, Flocafé)

== Domestic activities ==
In 2005 it won PDO designation for feta cheese.

Vivartia has been subject to accusations of collusion. In December 2007 Vivartia was initially found guilty of colluding with other milk producers (Nestlé, Fage, Mevgal and Olympos) to fix milk prices in Greece to the disadvantage of the consumer. A contested decision as milk prices are regulated by the European Union (and Greek authorities) as well as the unlawful actions of certain Greek civil servants. Management have never been charged with wrongdoing. Yet the State's Prosecuting agent investigating this case against Vivartia and Mevgal, Panayotis Adamopoulos, was jailed for bribery and extortion attempts against the companies.

== International expansion ==
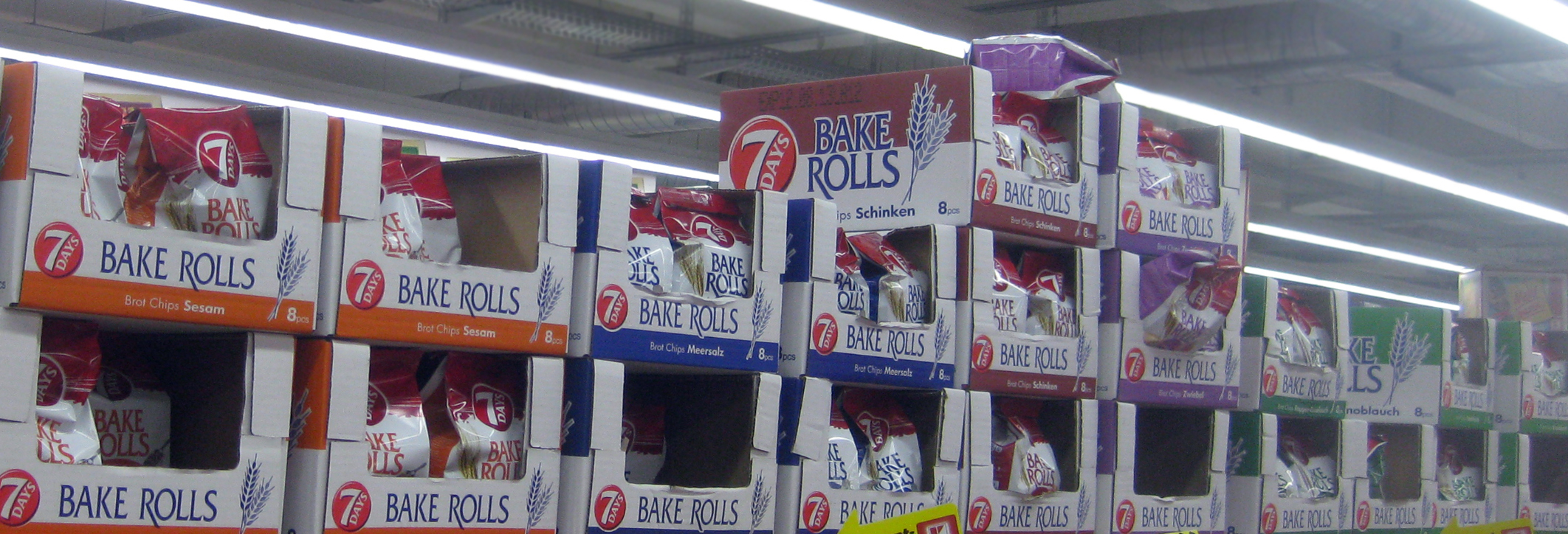
7days Bake Rolls in a German supermarket

In the Balkans, Vivartia is active in Serbia and Bulgaria and is interested in tapping the rising consumer demand elsewhere in the region and in Russia.

Outside of Europe Vivartia is also active in Egypt and Mexico.

In 2007, Vivartia plans to expand into organic farming in Romania and into fast-food chain franchising in Serbia.

In 2008, Vivartia bought US biscuit and snack-producer Nonni's for $320 million as part of its expansion plans, along with its brands Nonni's and New York Style and Old London. The acquisition also ensured an entry of Vivartia's 7 Days croissant products to the US market, to be followed by other products at a later stage. In that same year, Vivartia also announced plans to open a new plant in Yadkinville to complement its six existing US plants. As of March 2010, Vivartia now produces and sells 7-Days Croissants in the United States.

In 2014, Vivartia announced a cooperation with Granarolo for market access to France and Italy. This arrangement reflects a continuation of the original strategy put in place in 2003.
