= Justin Jenk =

British-Danish business executive and investor

- Born: February 1960 (age 66); Mumbai, India
- Education: Harvard Business School; University of Oxford; Davidson College
- Occupations: Business executive, practical strategist, entrepreneur

Justin Michael Spencer Jenk (born February 1960) is a British-Danish business executive and investor. He is a co-founder of the advisory firm, Raktas, and an investor in multiple companies such as: Venturethree, Danfoss-Turbocor, Arcam, Põhjala Brewery and Gate Capital.

As a partner at both McKinsey & Company and Accenture, Jenk helped build both firms' global presence as well as advised a number of international clients engaged in the: consumer goods, industrial products; property; technology and financial sectors. Independently, he led teams that implemented bad bank approaches in Europe, notably Securum and Swedbank.

== Early life and education ==
Jenk was born in 1960 in Bombay; now Mumbai, India to Jørgen Jenk and Faith Sisman. His father was an international businessman and decorated war veteran; his mother was a senior royal flights stewardess for BOAC. Jenk was brought up in India, Switzerland, the United States and the United Kingdom. Jenk attended both Westminster School and St Paul's School in London. In 1978, he won a Dean Rusk scholarship to Davidson College in North Carolina. He then attended the University of Oxford, where he read Geography and was a varsity sportsman, graduating with a Bachelor of Arts in 1982. Jenk attended Harvard Business School, graduating in 1988 with an MBA.

== Career ==
=== 1982–1986 ===
In 1982, Jenk joined the Swire Group, the Hong Kong-based conglomerate. He worked with its transport-related interests in the Australian, Pacific, Asian and Persian-Gulf regions. With each posting Jenk was responsible for: day-to-day operations; capital budgeting (vessels and aircraft) as well as processes improvements. These postings included: road transport; fishing/cold-storage; logistics; airline management; satellite navigation; as well as bulk/container shipping businesses. Given the nature of the businesses and locations, Jenk was actively engaged in supporting relief efforts for: the 1983 Ash Wednesday fires in Adelaide; the 1984 evacuation for the Rabaul eruption and; the 1985 safe shipping transit in the Persian Gulf during the First Gulf War.

=== 1988–2002 ===
In 1988, Jenk joined McKinsey & Company in its Stockholm office. During his time at McKinsey, Jenk opened and managed eight new offices, including Rio de Janeiro, Athens and Moscow as well as the restructuring of Milan. He also co-founded McKinsey's Strategy and Corporate Finance Practice in London. In 1992, at the height of the financial crisis in Sweden, Jenk's team advised the Swedish Government with regard to ‘saving’ Nordbanken, the state-owned bank, from insolvency. The solution was to create Securum, a so-called "bad bank", that would assume and unwind Nordbanken's non-performing loans and bad debt. Securum took over a quarter of Nordbanken's credit portfolio, protecting Nordbanken's capital, liquidity and operations. This work facilitated the creation of Nordea, one of Europe's leading banks as well as providing a positive impact to Taxpayers’ funds. In 1993, Jenk was asked to open and lead McKinsey's Moscow office as part the firm's expansion into Eastern Europe. He advised Russian companies and businessmen on how to capitalise on the emerging consumer and financial markets. He assisted in the development of VimpelCom Ltd., LOMO, Alfa Capital, and other enterprises as the privatization process unfolded as well as the Hermitage Museum, and World Bank Apex bank programme. Jenk also helped create Russian Standard and Brewpole, with its merger Zywiec-Heineken in Poland. Jenk was instrumental in advising various brewery owners with regard to the development and consolidation of the Greater European beer industry. The current AB InBev has its roots in this process, through Jenk's support to Interbrew and its owners.

During this period, Jenk was an investor in certain enterprises – such as Venturethree, amongst others. In 2001, the newly formed Accenture recruited Jenk to develop the growing company. He was appointed to its transformation team as well as made a co-head of its Restructuring/Mergers and Acquisitions practice, with a focus on Europe and Asia.

=== 2003–2007 ===
In 2003, Dimitris Daskalopoulos, the owner of Delta Holdings, the leading Greek consumer goods company, appointed Jenk as its CEO. Jenk transformed Delta with positive effect on its performance and finances. Based on a full scale restructuring, refinancing, as well as transactions (such as with Nestle and Danone as well as the 2006 absorption of Chipita and four other consumer product companies) resulted in a vibrant company. Delta was a “Grand National sponsor” for the 2004 Athens Olympics. This revitalized company was renamed Vivartia. In 2007, Vivartia was sold to private equity interests for €1.4 billion; Jenk resigned as CEO with this change of ownership. In 2008, Jenk faced legal allegations in Greece regarding his trading of Delta stock shares. In 2015 the Greek Supreme Court found Jenk innocent and vacated all charges against him.

=== 2008–2013 ===
In 2008, Jenk founded Raktas, a company that provides growth, business-building and restructuring services. As part of its services, he co-founded European Resolution Capital (ERC), a specialist bank restructuring firm. ERC worked with governments and financial institutions during the 2008 financial crisis. In 2008, Jenk advised the Irish Government on its creation of the National Asset Management Agency (NAMA) and latterly assisted the Spanish Government in the creation of SAREB. From 2009 to 2011, Jenk was involved in the rescue of Sweden's Swedbank from near insolvency. With the support of the Swedish central bank ("Riksbanken"), Swedbank CEO Michael Wolf retained Jenk and ERC to organize, lead and manage its bad bank operations. Jenk's and his specialist team's activities in the Baltic and Swedish markets in conjunction with parent bank restructurings and central banks’ support was essential to the successful rescue of Swedbank as well as stabilising the Baltic and Swedish economies during the crisis. The Baltic ‘bad bank’ had €10 billion assets and 1,100 affected firms under management at the peak of the crisis. The Estonian state awarded Swedbank the Cross of Terra Mariana, for its work to resolve the crisis. Jenk was then asked by Wolf to manage the parent bank's NPL portfolio of €24 billion assets in Sweden and establishment of Ektornet. These initiatives paved the way for important reforms to regional banking.

Jenk has also worked in the education sector, helping universities improve their performance. As a member of the International Advisory Board for the Open University Business School, Jenk helped oversee its global growth strategy.

In 2012, Jenk was appointed CEO of IFL, the Executive Education unit at Stockholm School of Economics (SSE). During Justins short time at SSE EXED the Russian campus was shut down and Justin later had to resign due to an insider trading sentence in Greece.

Jenk has been a guest-lecturer at both Oxford's Saïd Business School and Geography Department. He was chairman of the Board of Governors of St. Catherine's British School in Athens and is part of the Working Group at Keble College, Oxford.

=== 2014–present ===
Through Raktas, Jenk has continued his interests in: business, technology, finance as well as behavioural/cognitive sciences with their interactions. He works as a board member (NED), advisor and business angel in a range of enterprises. These include: PlutusGroup (investment management & FinTech), LHV Pank (banking), Arcam (3-D printing, sold to GE), Turbocorp (magnetic bearings, sold to Danfoss), Venturethree and Põhjala Brewery (beer) as well as start-ups in sleep therapy/AI; gaming/VR; mobile apps/AR; SAAS; and blockchain technology for FinTech. Jenk is also a public speaker on topical business issues.
