= Greek Public Tobacco Factory =

Former tobacco factory in Athens

Coordinates: 37.9981°N 23.7105°E

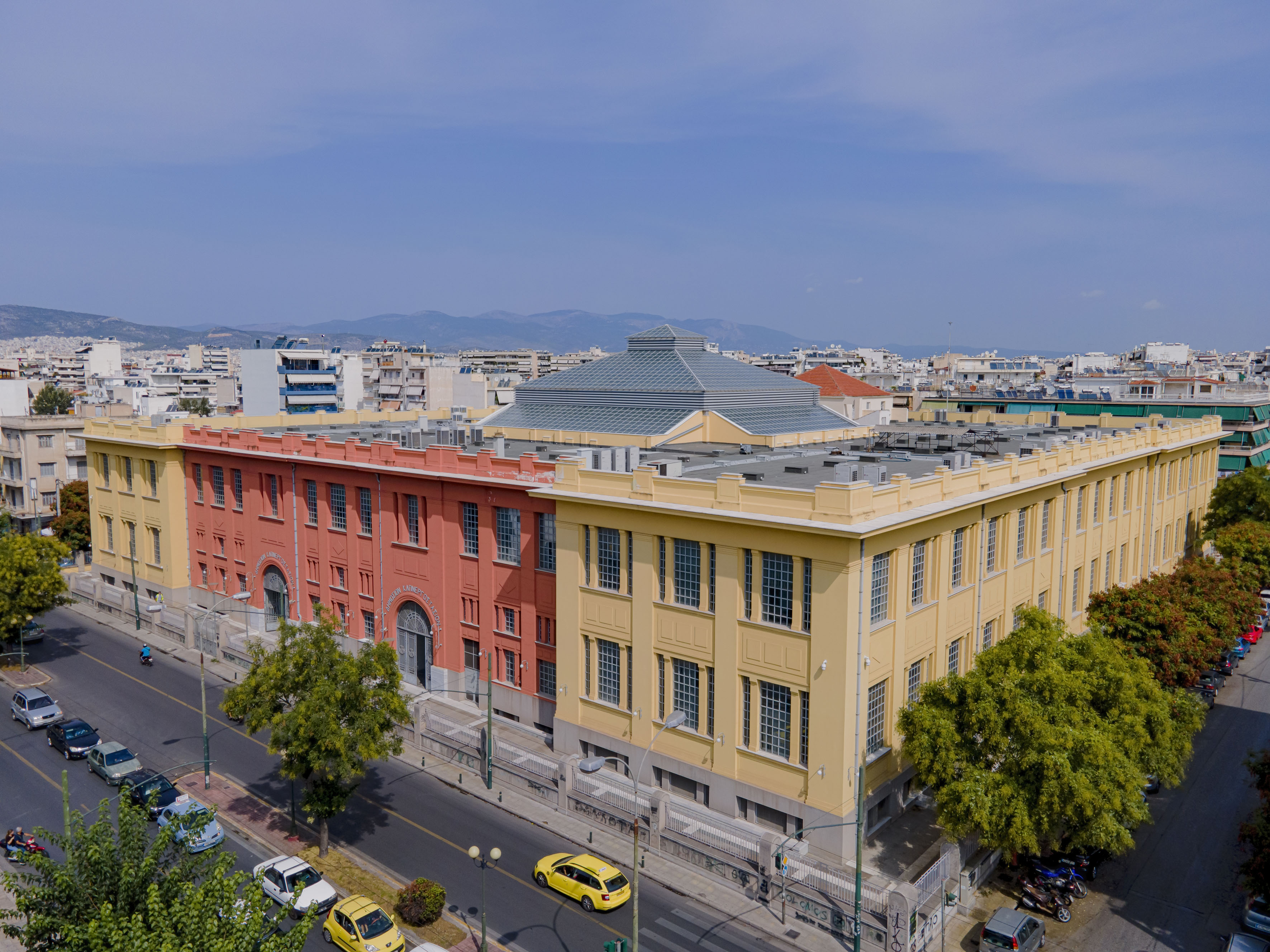
The Greek Public Tobacco Factory

The Greek Public Tobacco Factory at 218 Lenormann Street, in the area of Kolonos, was the second public tobacco factory in Athens, Greece, built by the Greek state at the time when the cigarette manufacturing industry was booming, to house the tobacco processing and packaging companies as well as the tobacco traders' warehouses, with the main purpose of fully controlling tobacco taxation. In its heyday it employed around 3000 workers.

== History ==
The great importance of tobacco is due to the fact that the country's soil and climate conditions are extremely favourable for the production of quality tobacco. The eastern type of tobacco, which is the predominantly Greek tobacco, exploited the poor sloping soils, which are therefore unsuitable for other crops.

The first steps of the tobacco industry were taken in the late 19th century with the annexation of Thessaly and Macedonia to Greece, areas known for tobacco cultivation. Tobacco production began to play a major role in the country's economy, becoming a valuable source of income for the inhabitants of the province as well as for the Greek state, which in 1883 introduced a tax on tobacco during the ministry of Ch.Trikoupis (Government Gazette A421/1883). The state tax amounted to 40% of the price of cigarettes. At the same time, smoking is spreading rapidly in Greece, which has now doubled in size, and abroad. Tobacco became the country's most important export product, taking the place of raisins.

In 1883, the country's first public tobacco factory was established, located on Stournari and Aristotelous Streets. The State wanted private entrepreneurs to carry out the cutting and cigars in a public place to be able to control and tax the tobacco products from their production. But as early as 1902, the facilities were unable to meet the growing needs of the country. The pressure of these needs was relieved for some years by expansions carried out on the premises.

== Building ==
In 1925 the Greek state with the passing of a Legislative Decree (Government Gazette 233/A/2-9-1925) purchased a plot of land of 9,118 sq.m. from the widow Ekaterini Vryzakis in the district of Kolokynthous and in 1927 the civil engineers Pavlos Athanasakis and Antonis Ligdopoulos were assigned to draw up the plans for the construction of a tobacco factory. This area was located on the then Kifissou Street, formerly Kolokynthous, and today's Lenormann today occupies the entire block between Lenormann, Amfiaraou, Leandrou and Creontos Streets.

The fire that broke out in 1928 at the first public tobacco factory and completely destroyed the building on Aristotelous Street made the need for a new tobacco factory imperative, with construction beginning that same year and being completed 2 years later (1930). The construction of the new building was entrusted to civil engineer Nikolaos Gavalas and the project budget was 2,988,000 drachmas.

The building consists of 4 wings, each of which was constructed separately with intermediate joints, it is two-storey with a semi-basement and a roof. It is developed in a square plan, with dimensions of 84,20×87,15 m around an atrium with an area of 1100 m² covered by a glass canopy with a metal frame made by the Greek Company B.I.O. Morphologically, it was shaped under the spirit of modernism expressed through a "purist" physiognomy and simple decoration, having of course some elements of the classicism that preceded it. In terms of construction, it followed the spirit of the time with the use of a reinforced concrete frame which allowed the predominance of openings at the expense of masonry.

Special care was taken for the ventilation and lighting of the space, which is why very large windows were constructed on all sides. Ventilation in particular was very important for this building, because the presence of possible dampness would create a problem of smoke.

The high taxation on tobacco led to smuggling and the introduction of customs in the tobacco factory. To further control the smuggling of the product, all the windows of the smokehouse were covered on the outside with metal screens.

== Use ==
The Athens Tobacco Factory housed several tobacco industries, tobacco cutting and packaging industries, cigarette and cigar production industries, while there were warehouses, a customs office, restaurants for the employees, as well as a house for the guardian of the building.

In particular, the ground floor housed the tobacco cutting and packaging industries, the factory management, the customs office, and the tobacco tax office. The floor was used for the production of cigarettes and cigars, while there were also 2 restaurant rooms for the workers, laundry rooms and toilets. In the semi-basement under direct State control were the tobacco warehouses. Each tobacco merchant could rent up to two warehouses. The blends of the cigarettes were prepared there, reducing the risk of smuggling. The atrium, a bold technical achievement for its time, was where the tobacco was unloaded.

In the 65 years of its operation, 25 cigarette factories were housed in the tobacco factory. The first to move in was the Lerta tobacco company and the last to leave in 1997 was the SANTE tobacco company

In detail, the cigarette manufacturers that were established in the factory were:

- Nikitas Lertas-VEKA
- Bros. Constantinou – SANTE
- Konstantinos Tzamalis Ltd.
- OYFA-VELLOS
- Ang.Koutarelis
- Nik.Margaritis
- Nik.Karaklis
- Joseph Papazoglou – Cigar Industry
- Leonidas Papaioannou
- Β. Karavasilis
- Kapernaros
- I. Helmis
- E.Paleokrassas
- Ι. Korakitis
- Kolovos
- Liapis
- Tobacco Manufacturers' Market Cooperative (SKAK)
- EBES. An. Greek Industrial Company of Cigars

With the prevalence of private tobacco factories and mechanized cigarette production, the tobacco factory gradually begins to underperform. In 1938 and for about 30 years, a quarter of the space was given to the military service of Athens.

During the occupation, the building was initially used as a shelter and was later converted into a concentration camp and detention centre for the Germans. After their departure, the building was looted by angry civilians. During the Decembrance (1944), it was bombed. It serves as a care centre for refugees from the Kolokynthos region and gives shelter to needy families as well as refugees from Romania, Russia. Afterwards it met various needs of the State:

- 1945: Prison for prisoners of the Military Service.
- 1963: Court of Audit of Greece
- 1964: General Directorate of the Press.
- 1968: Statistical Service.
- 1972: General Directorate of Taxation
- 1988: Warehouses of the Ministry of Public Works

On 20 December 1977 a large group of residents of Kolon gathered outside the Tobacco Factory, began to protest and demanded that it be removed from their area. These protests continued, resulting in the definitive closure of the Tobacco Factory on 1 March 1978.

== Historic preservation ==
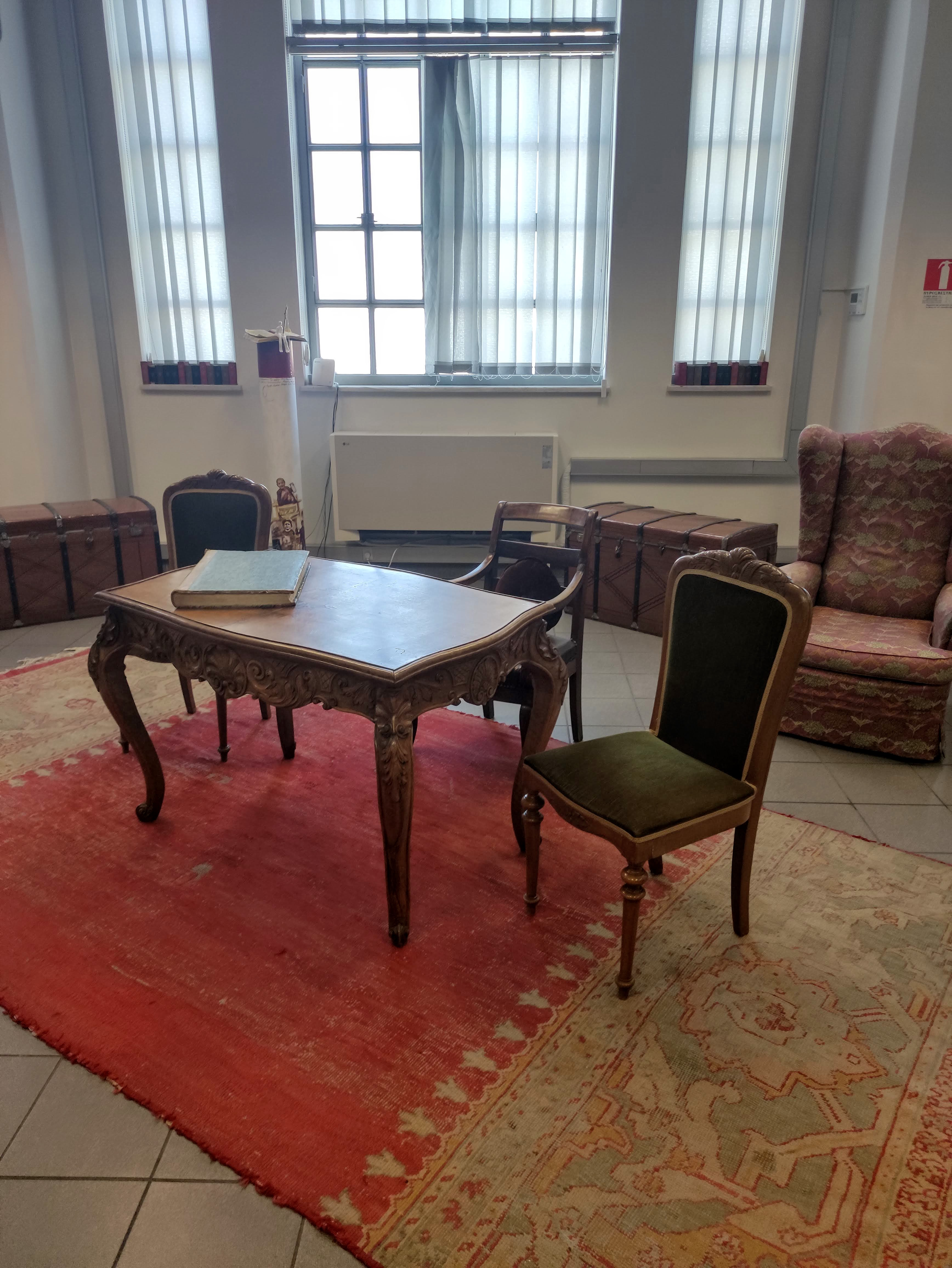
Photo from the Parliament Library at the Greek public Tobacco Factory in Athens

In 1989, the Ministry of Culture designated the Public Tobacco Factory of Lenormann Street as a historical monument along with its mechanical equipment, because it was considered to be an excellent example of industrial architecture and an important example of the tobacco industry in Greece, in terms of the way and conditions of production, as well as the operational organization. Since the early 1990s, the building's premises have been granted to the Greek Parliament to house parts of its publications and library.

In 2000, by an act of the State Land Company, the building was fully transferred to the Hellenic Parliament. In 2005, work began on the restoration of the facades and the surrounding area. In 2008 the restoration of the external facades was completed and in 2016 the restoration of the metal roof of the atrium was completed.

In 2021 part of the Public Tobacco Factory was renovated and transformed into a cultural space spanning 6.500sq.m. The renovation was the result of the collaboration between the Hellenic Parliament and NEON Organization and was funded solely by NEON founder, Dimitris Daskalopoulos and was gifted back to the state as a fully functional cultural center.

== Today ==
The building currently houses the Publications and Printing Division of the Parliament and the City Library and Library Systems Management Department, the Department for the Preservation and Conservation of Printed Materials and Works of Art and, temporarily, the Benaki Library and Political Personnel Collections Department of the Library of the Parliament.

== Collections of the Parliament Library ==
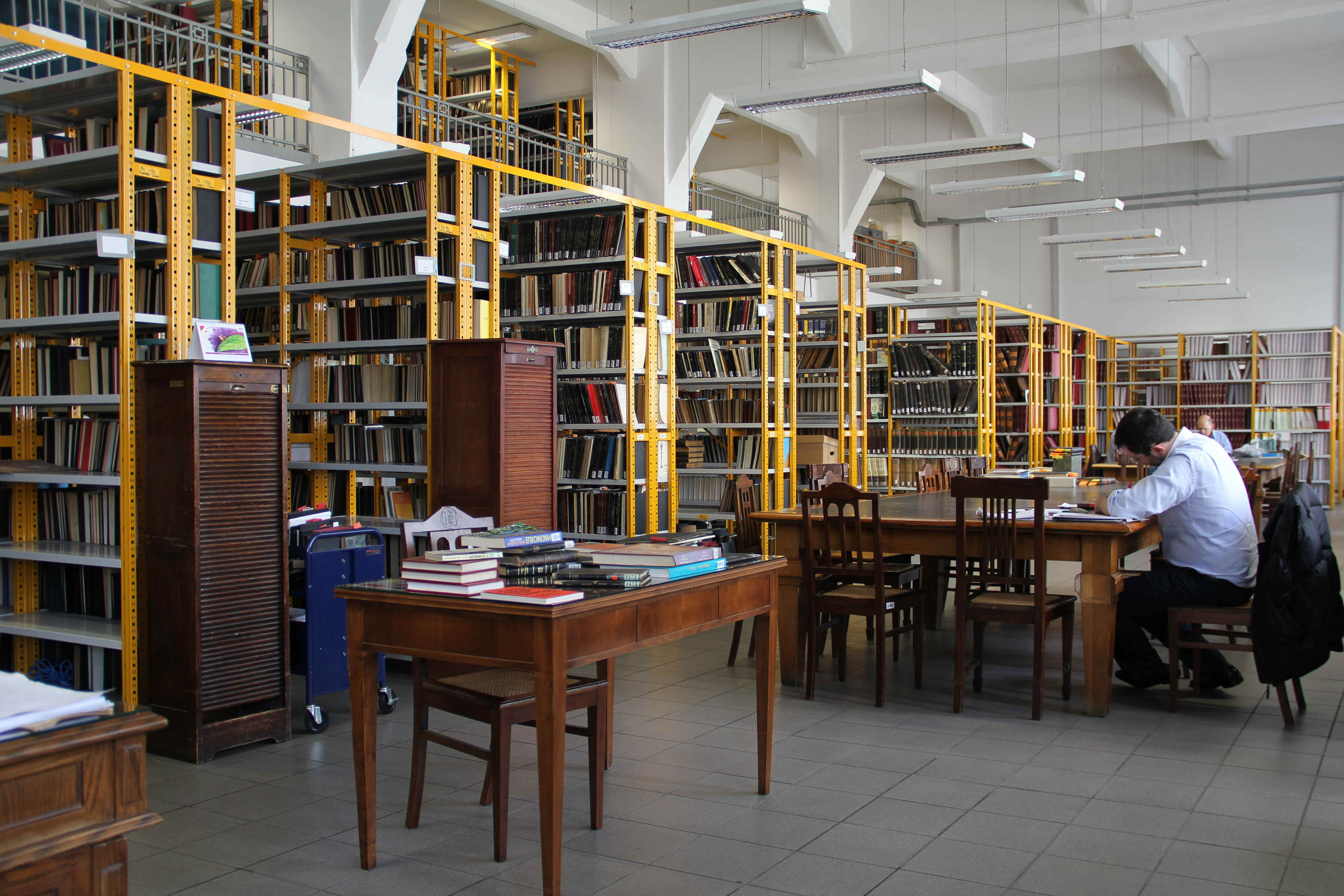
Greek Parliament Library at the Greek Public tobacco Factory in Athens

The Library of the Hellenic Parliament includes in its collections approximately 650,000 volumes of books of all sciences, newspapers from 1789 and periodicals with an emphasis on the 17th–18th centuries. The development of its collections is based on the provisions of Law 4452/2017 (Government Gazette 17/A/15-2-2017), where the publisher or the author, when there is no publisher, is obliged to submit four copies of documents to the National Library of Greece any kind and form of material media, such as print, audio-visual, electronic, of which one 1 is intended for the Library of the Hellenic Parliament.

- The Central Library includes a developed collection of books on political, economic and social sciences, law and history, to support parliamentary work, and a general information department (encyclopedias, dictionaries, manuals, infrastructure projects, etc.). In addition, it also includes the Special Collections: manuscripts and codices, archetypes, ancient and rare editions, works of art, maps, historical relics, photographs and political pamphlets of the 19th and 20th centuries.
- The Benakeios Library, part of which is a donation by Emmanuel Benakis to the Hellenic Parliament, to house the Psychari library (35,000 volumes), includes books related to the sciences of mathematics, physics, anthropology, philosophy, theology, of medicine, Greek and foreign literature and fine arts. The Benakio Library also houses the personal libraries of politicians, such as Ant. Zygomala, I. Metaxa, Al. Kafantari, I. Sideri, P. Tsaldari et al.
- The former Public Tobacco Factory houses the largest volume of book collections of all thematic categories, as well as recent editions of Greek and foreign literature, the sciences, etc.
