= New Paros Airport =

Airport serving the island of Paros, Greece

Paros National Airport "Panteleou Paros Airport"
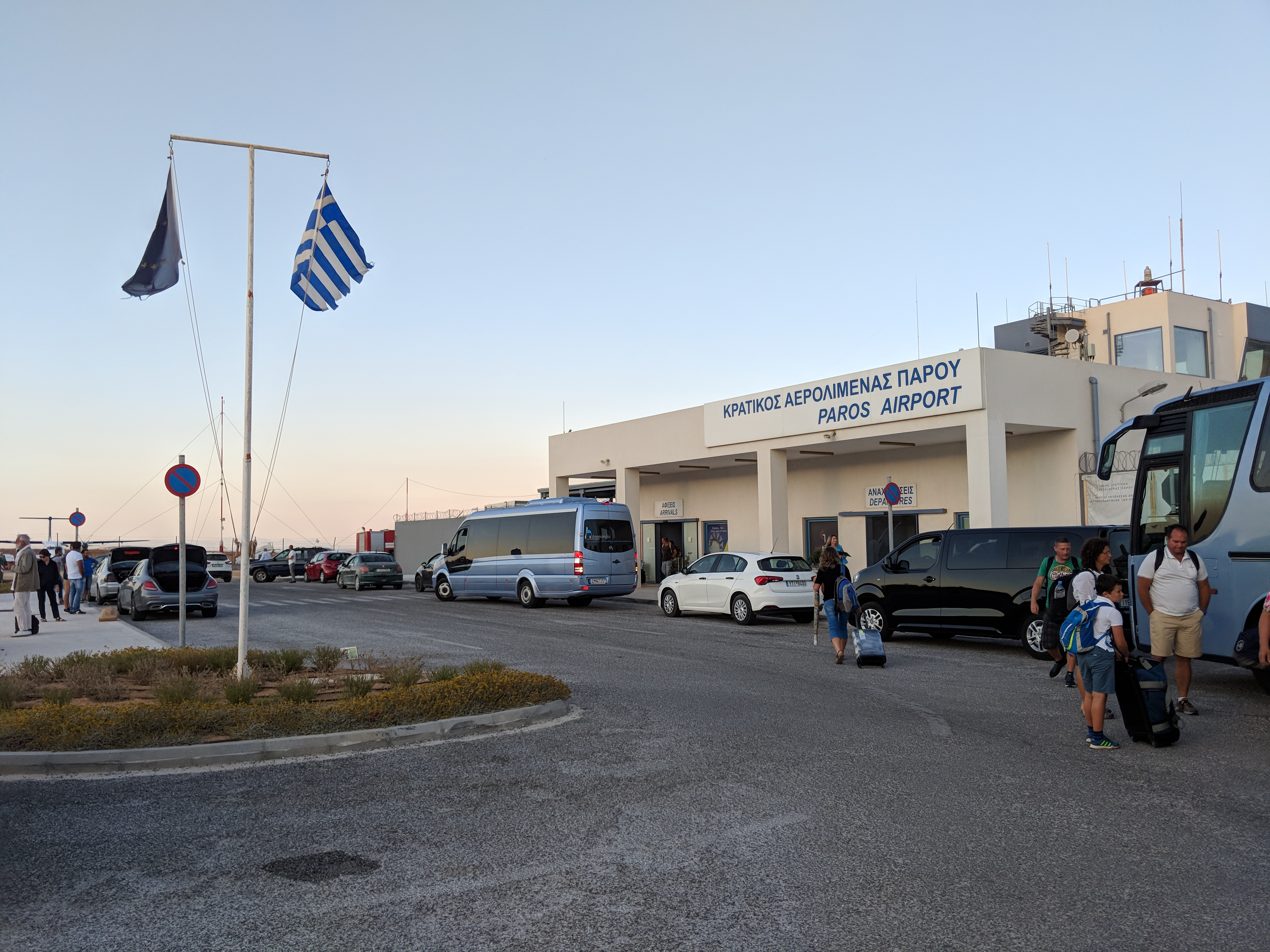
- IATA: PAS; ICAO: LGPA

Summary
- Airport type: Public
- Owner: Greek State
- Operator: HCAA
- Serves: Paros
- Location: Kampos
- Elevation AMSL: 125 ft (38 m)
- Coordinates: 37°01′15″N 25°06′47″E

Map
- Location of airport in Greece

Runways
Direction	Length		Surface
Direction	ft	m	Surface
17/35	4,593	1,400	Asphalt

Statistics (2018)
- Passengers: 204,924
- Passenger traffic change: ▲25.7%
- Aircraft movements: 3,712
- Aircraft movements change: ▲15.1%
- Source: HCAA

Paros National Airport (IATA: PAS, ICAO: LGPA) is the airport serving the island of Paros, Greece, in the Cyclades islands region. The airport is located in the southwestern part of the island, about 10 kilometres (6.2 mi) from the port of Parikia. It replaced the Old Paros National Airport on 25 July 2016.

== History ==
The old airport of Paros, which was situated a few kilometers to the south, was operational since 1982. Its 710-meter runway became insufficient as larger numbers of passengers required larger aircraft, so a new airport was built, opening in 2016, and taking over all operations of the old airport. Its wide, 1,400 meter runway supports larger aircraft.

Since 8 June 2018, Smartwings, a Czech charter airline, is the first operator to regularly fly with a medium-sized jet to Paros. The flight is operated with a fuel stop at Santorini Airport on the return leg, due to no fuel being available at Paros.

Olympic Air, a subsidiary of Aegean Airlines, financed both the construction of the first phase of the terminal and the infrastructure works for the new airport.

On 11 November 2020, it was announced that funding of over €43m was guaranteed to complete the airport and serve international destinations. Works will include a new terminal of 12.500m2, an extended runway of 1800m, a new control tower and other facilities. Works were scheduled to start in June 2021 and were scheduled to be completed by the end of 2023.

== Airlines and destinations ==
The following airlines operate regular scheduled and charter flights at Paros Airport:

Airlines	Destinations
Aegean Airlines	Seasonal: Heraklion, Thessaloniki
Avanti Air	Seasonal charter: Klagenfurt, Graz
Olympic Air	Athens
Sky Express	Athens; Seasonal: Thessaloniki

== Ground transportation ==
Other than car, the airport is linked to the city of Parikia by bus from the nearby bus station. There are also taxis available to any destination on the island.

== See also ==
- Transport in Greece
