= Michael Rakowitz =

American artist

Michael Rakowitz مايكل راكويتز
- Born: 22 October 1973 (age 52); Long Island, New York
- Education: Massachusetts Institute of Technology; State University of New York at Purchase
- Website: www.michaelrakowitz.com

Michael Rakowitz (Arabic: مايكل راكويتز; born 22 October 1973 in Long Island, New York) is an Iraqi-American artist living and working in Chicago. He is best known for his conceptual art shown in non-gallery contexts.

Rakowitz is Professor of Art Theory and Practice at Northwestern University, and is represented by Rhona Hoffman Gallery, Chicago; Jane Lombard Gallery, New York; Barbara Wien Galerie, Berlin; and Green Art Gallery, Dubai. He lives and works in Chicago.

== Work ==
Rakowitz’s works have appeared in venues worldwide. This includes dOCUMENTA (13), P.S.1, MoMA, MassMOCA, Castello di Rivoli, Palais de Tokyo, the 16th Biennale of Sydney, the 10th and 14th Istanbul Biennials, Sharjah Biennial 8, Tirana Biennale, National Design Triennial at the Cooper-Hewitt, Transmediale 05, FRONT Triennial in Cleveland, and CURRENT:LA Public Art Triennial. He has had solo projects and exhibitions with Creative Time, Tate Modern in London, The Wellin Museum of Art, MCA Chicago, Lombard Freid Gallery and Jane Lombard Gallery in New York, SITE Santa Fe, Galerie Barbara Wien in Berlin, Rhona Hoffman Gallery in Chicago, Malmö Konsthall, Tensta Konsthall, and Kunstraum Innsbruck.

Rakowitz's work addresses the history of colonialism and extraction in museums. He has reconstructed artifacts looted from the Iraq Museum and excavation sites from diasporic ephemera such as newspapers and grocery stores.

In 2019, he put together an exhibition at the Green Art Gallery in Los Angeles titled Dispute Between the Tamarisk and the Date Palm, in inspiration by an Akkadian disputation poem known as Tamarisk and Palm. The duration of the exhibition was from March 9 – September 1, 2019.

In 2025 he opened the exhibition Allspice - Michael Rakowitz & Ancient Cultures at the Acropolis Museum, making him the first living artist to have an exhibition at the Museum. Allspice is the first in a trilogy of exhibitions organised by the Hellenic Ministry of Culture, the Acropolis Museum, the Ephorate of Antiquities of Athens and the Athens based non-profit organisation NEON that is unfolding between 2025 and 2026.

== Prizes and awards ==
He is the recipient of the 2020 Nasher Prize; the 2018 Herb Alpert Award in the Arts; a 2012 Tiffany Foundation Award; a 2008 Creative Capital Grant; a Sharjah Biennial Jury Award; a 2006 New York Foundation for the Arts Fellowship Grant in Architecture and Environmental Structures; the 2003 Dena Foundation Award, and the 2002 Design 21 Grand Prix from UNESCO. He was awarded the Fourth Plinth commission (2018-2020) in London's Trafalgar Square. From 2019 - 2020, a survey of Rakowitz's work traveled from Whitechapel Gallery in London, to Castello di Rivoli Museo d’Arte Contemporanea in Torino, to the Jameel Arts Centre in Dubai.
