= Flocafé =

Greek coffeehouse chain

Flocafé Espresso Room
- Type: Franchise
- Industry: Food and Beverage
- Founded: 1994
- Headquarters: AIA El. Venizelos. Building 14B | 190 19 Spata Attikis, Athens, Greece
- Area served: Greece, Cyprus, UK, Bulgaria, Qatar, Hungary, Kuwait, The Netherlands, Egypt
- Products: Coffee, Pastry
- Parent: Vivartia S.A.
- Website: https://www.flocafe.gr https://goodyseverest.com/

Flocafé Espresso Room is a Greek franchise coffee house chain and belongs to Vivartia, a nutrition conglomerate brand that owns several similar franchises. Flocafé Espresso Room is one of the largest coffee chains in Greece and among the top branded chains in Europe (according to ©FoodService Europe & Middle East).

With the cooperation of the Flokas family from Metsovo, well known for their pastry shops in Thessaloniki since the late 19th century, and the founders of Goody's opened its first outlet in Athens in 1994. It now operates over 100 coffee houses in the Balkan Peninsula, Cyprus and on several cruise ships. In 2006 it held a 10.2% of the Greek market share. Free internet is provided by Vodafone.

== Stores ==
These were the stores of Flocafé as of February 2025:

Country	Stores
Greece	100
Qatar	6
Netherlands	6
United Kingdom	2
Bulgaria	1
Cyprus	1
Egypt	1
Hungary	1
Kuwait	1

== See also ==
- List of coffeehouse chains
