= Neon (organization) =

Non-profit art organization in Athens

NEON
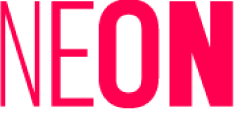
- Established: 2013
- Location: GR
- Type: Non Profit Organization of contemporary art
- Founder: Dimitris Daskalopoulos
- Director: Elina Kountouri
- Website: neon.org.gr

NEON (pronounced /né.on/) which means new in Greek, is a Greece-based non-profit organization founded in 2013 by collector and entrepreneur Dimitris Daskalopoulos and directed by Elina Kountouri.

The organization facilitates public access to contemporary art through exhibitions, commissions, educational initiatives, and cultural collaborations. NEON does not have a permanent exhibition space but collaborates with institutions to present contemporary art in various locations across Greece, including archaeological sites and museums. In 2021, NEON funded the renovation of the former Public Tobacco Factory in Athens, which was subsequently donated to the Greek state for use as a cultural center. In 2025 the organization announced a trilogy with artist Michael Rakowitz at the Acropolis Museum and the old Acropolis Museum on the Acropolis Hill in Athens.

In May 2026, NEON's founder Dimitris Daskalopoulos announced the Organization is set to conclude its activities with its last exhibition being by Michael Rakowitz on Acropolis Hill.

== Exhibitions and projects ==
NEON has organized temporary exhibitions featuring Greek and international artists in public and private venues such as AS ONE a collaboration with the Marina Abramović Institute (MAI) at the Benaki Museum (2016) where Greek artists trained with Marina Abramović for long durational performance, The Theater of Disappearance by Adrián Villar Rojas at the National Observatory of Athens (2017) where the artist repopulated the Ancient Hill of Nymphs with 26 plant species and 11 large vitrines. As part of its collaboration with Ephorate of Antiquities of Cyclades, they presented Antony Gormley | SIGHT on the archaeological site and museum of island of Delos in 2019 installing 29 iron sculptures on the archaeological site.

In 2021 and 2022, NEON put together Portals and Dream On in collaboration with the Hellenic Parliament at the newly renovated former Public Tobacco Factory the later featuring works from the D.Daskalopoulos Collection Gift. At the same time, they presented the short film Bleat directed by Yorgos Lanthimos starring Emma Stone and Damien Bonnard filmed in 35mm film and accompanied by a live orchestra, as part of the project The Artist on the Composer in collaboration with the Greek National Opera. Its US Premiere took place a year later in 2023 at the New York Film Festival.

In 2024 they organized space of togetherness at the National Theatre of Greece Drama School featuring works by 20 artists and collectives.

In 2025 NEON announced an exhibition trilogy at the Acropolis Museum and the old Acropolis Museum on Acropolis Hill with artist Michael Rakowitz during 2025-2026.

Infrastructure Support

NEON has contributed to the renovation and development of cultural spaces in Greece:

- The Athens Conservatoire basement was renovated in 2016 and later returned to the institution.
- The Public Tobacco Factory was renovated with NEON funding and transferred to the Greek state in 2023.
