= Athens International Airport =

International airport serving Athens, Greece

Athens International Airport "Eleftherios Venizelos" Διεθνής Αερολιμένας Αθηνών «Ελευθέριος Βενιζέλος»

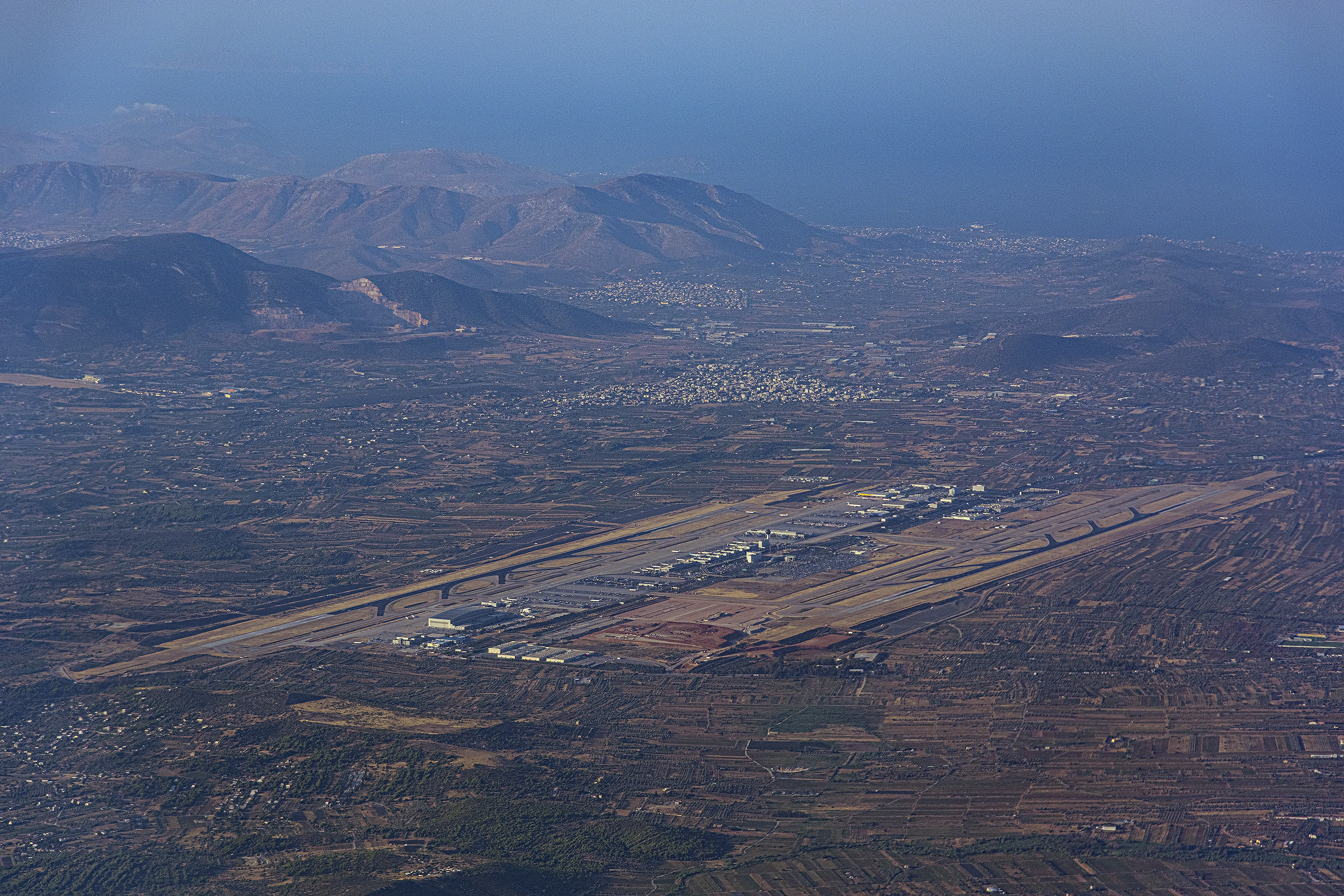
- Aerial view of the airport in 2026
- IATA: ATH; ICAO: LGAV; WMO: 16716

Summary
- Airport type: Public
- Owner/Operator: Athens International Airport S.A.
- Serves: Athens Metropolitan Area
- Location: Spata, Attica, Greece
- Opened: 28 March 2001; 25 years ago
- Hub for: Aegean Airlines; Olympic Air
- Operating base for: Ryanair; Sky Express
- Built: Hochtief, GEK Terna
- Elevation AMSL: 308 ft (94 m)
- Coordinates: 37°56′11″N 23°56′50″E
- Website: www.aia.gr

Maps
- Airport diagram

- Location in Greece
- Interactive map of Athens International Airport "Eleftherios Venizelos"

Runways
Direction	Length		Surface
Direction	ft	m	Surface
03R/21L	13,123	4,000	Asphalt
03L/21R	12,467	3,800	Asphalt

Statistics (2025)
- Passengers: 33,993,746
- Passenger traffic change: ▲6.7%
- Aircraft movements: 283,589
- Aircraft movements change: ▲5.7%
- Sources: AIA Statistics

Athens International Airport Eleftherios Venizelos (IATA: ATH, ICAO: LGAV), commonly initialised as AIA, is the largest international airport in Greece, serving the city of Athens and the region of Attica as well as connecting traffic. It began operation on 28 March 2001 (in time for the 2004 Summer Olympics) and is the main base of Aegean Airlines, as well as other smaller Greek airlines. It replaced the old Ellinikon International Airport.

Athens International Airport is a member of Group 1 of Airports Council International (over 25 million passengers). As of 2025, it is the 15th-busiest airport in Europe and the second busiest and second largest in the Balkans, after Istanbul Airport.

== History ==
=== Development and ownership ===
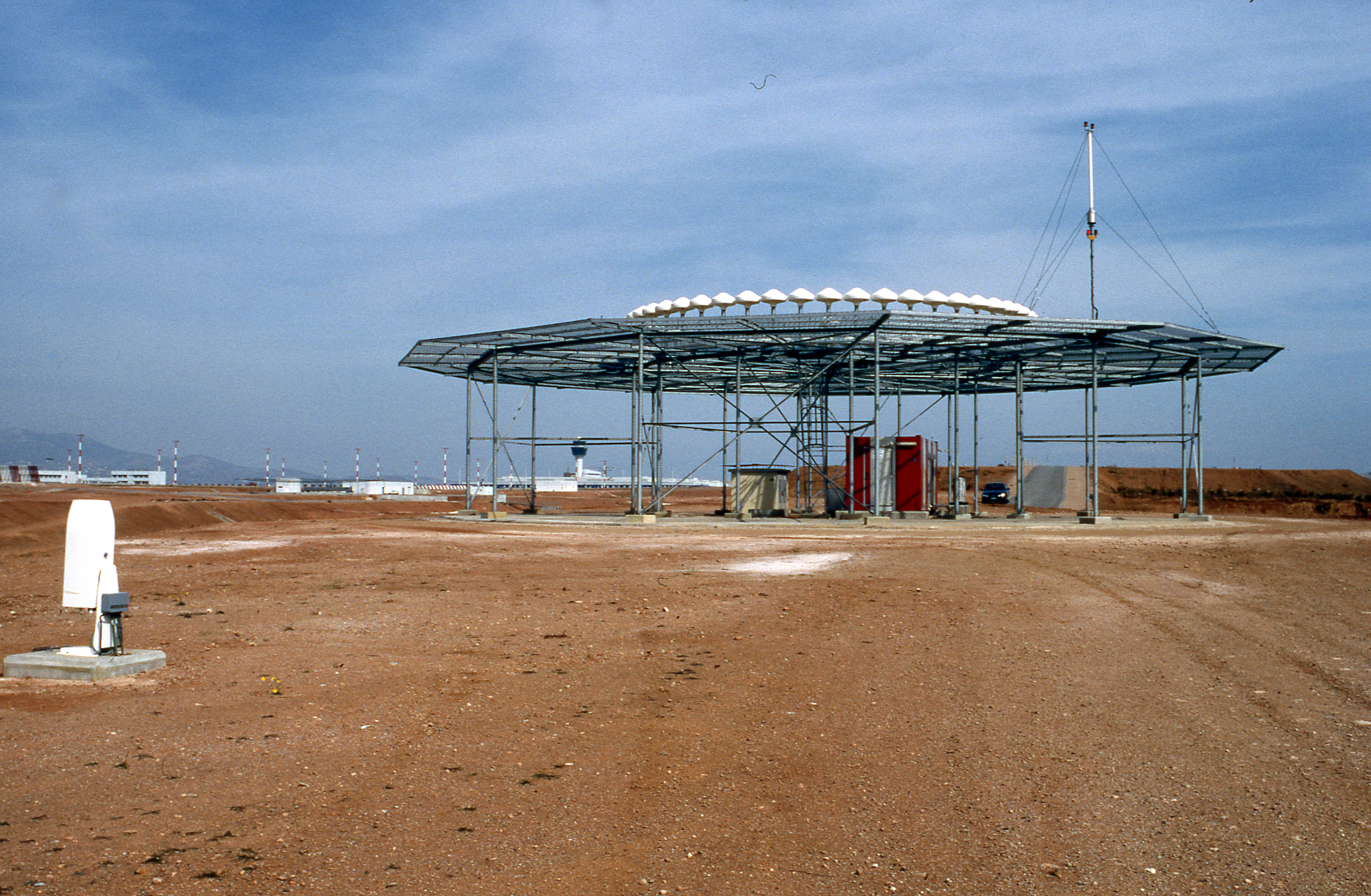
Terminal VOR/DME at Athens International Airport

AIA is located between the towns of Markopoulo, Koropi, Spata and Loutsa, about 20 km (12 mi) to the east of central Athens (30 km (19 mi) by road, due to intervening hills). The airport is named after Elefthérios Venizélos. As to-date, the airport is operated by AIA S.A. and ownership is divided between the Hellenic Republic (Greek State) and Private Sector in a 55%-45% stake following a PPP scheme for the airport company. Currently, private investors include the Copelouzos Group (5%) and PSP Investments of Canada (40%), following purchase of Hochtief's shares.

The airport was constructed to replace Athens (Ellinikon) International Airport, which was at capacity with no space for growth. Studies for a new airport had been carried out from as early as the 1970s, with as many as 19 different locations being looked at before an area close to the town of Spata was chosen. Athens Airport SA, a state-owned company, was established in 1978 to proceed with the plans. After delays and slow development, the project was revived in 1991, about a year after the city lost the right to host the 1996 Summer Olympics to Atlanta, Georgia. A bid for the 2000 Summer Games was discussed, but in the end, Athens hosted the 2004 Summer Olympics, and the government launched an international tender for a build-own-operate-transfer partner for the airport, with Hochtief of Germany being selected.

In 1996, Athens International Airport S.A. (AIA) was established as a public–private partnership with a 30-year concession agreement. That same year, the €2.1 billion development began with an estimated completion date of February 2001. The airport itself was completed in October 2000, but opening was delayed a month because surface connections to Attiki Odos were not complete. The airport officially opened on 28 March 2001 with parallel runways, 4 km (2.5 mi) and 3.8 km (2.4 mi) long. The airport was approved by the European Aviation Safety Agency and the Federal Aviation Administration for take-offs and landings of the largest passenger jet, the A380. The first A380 to visit 'Eleftherios Venizelos' Athens International Airport made a medical emergency medical landing on 13 April 2011; the first scheduled A380 flight was on 26 October 2012 by Emirates.

=== Greek government debt-crisis impact (2009–2013) ===
The Greek government-debt crisis reduced the overall passenger traffic of the airport for six consecutive years. Many long-haul airlines stopped service to the airport, while others suspended service service in the winter. These problems were exacerbated by the closure of Olympic Airlines, which operated many long-haul flights to and from the airport. In 2013, the airport handled about 12.5 million passengers, 3.2% fewer than in 2012 and 25% lower than in 2007, the all-time-high at that time.

=== Recovery and new levels of passenger traffic (2014–2015) ===
2014 signaled a strong recovery for the airport's passenger traffic. More than ten new airlines started new flights to and from Athens. Aegean Airlines strengthened its network by 30% (with many more destinations scheduled for 2015) while Ryanair established a new base in the Athens Airport and added eight destinations. During 2014 the airport operators reported a passenger traffic volume of 15.1 million passengers, an increase of over 21%. This was the result of new destinations, and capacity increases on existing routes, such as the resumption of flights by Singapore Airlines and Gulf Air, and the decision by Emirates, Etihad Airways and Qatar Airways to fly more frequently to and from Athens. Delta Air Lines resumed their weekly flights and American Airlines retained their seasonal schedules to and from the US with even more frequent connectivity.

According to AIA published statistics, total traffic for 2015 achieved an impressive performance reaching almost 18.1 million passengers, an all-time-record for the airport at that time, increased by 19% on year-over-year basis and by 1.55 million (+9.4%) the previous best, which was the pre-crisis year 2007. In addition, over the same period, aircraft traffic exhibited a solid growth of 14% year-over-year.

=== Exceeding twenty million passengers (2016–2023) and beyond ===
2016 was a landmark year for the Athens International Airport, both for domestic and international destinations. Annual results reflected a solid performance for a third year in a row fueled by double-digit growth, this time passing the twenty million mark, increased by 10.7% on year-over-year basis. Healthy growth continued in 2017 with the airport showing a traffic increase of 8.6% to a total of 21.7 million passengers, yet another all-time record for the Athens airport. During 2018, the airport achieved yet another record high, reporting increased passenger traffic by 11% to more than 24.1 million passengers. Equally, aircraft traffic achieved a new record with a reported annual growth of 10.8% to 217,094 movements.

For the first ten months of 2023, the airport traffic shows signs of further increase with passenger numbers up by 19.5% to 24.4 million passengers and aircraft movements up by 15.2%. By the end of 2023, Athens saw about 28.17 million international and domestic passengers. This is a 10.2% increase from 2019.

In the second half of June 2018, Emirates added an extra daily flight from its base in Dubai Airport using the Airbus A380 superjumbo, marking the first time the "superjumbo" operated at the airport with a scheduled flight. The A380 service was discontinued at the end of August 2018.

== Terminals ==
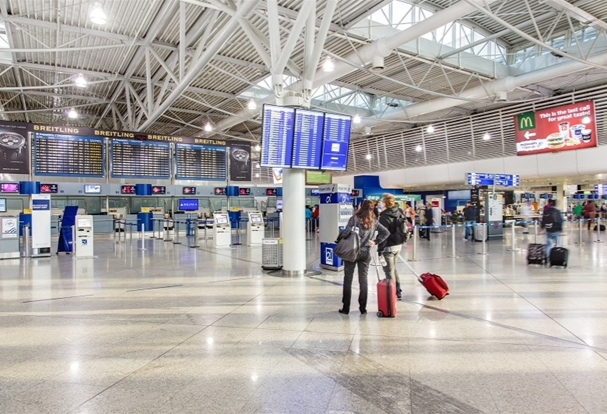
Check-in area

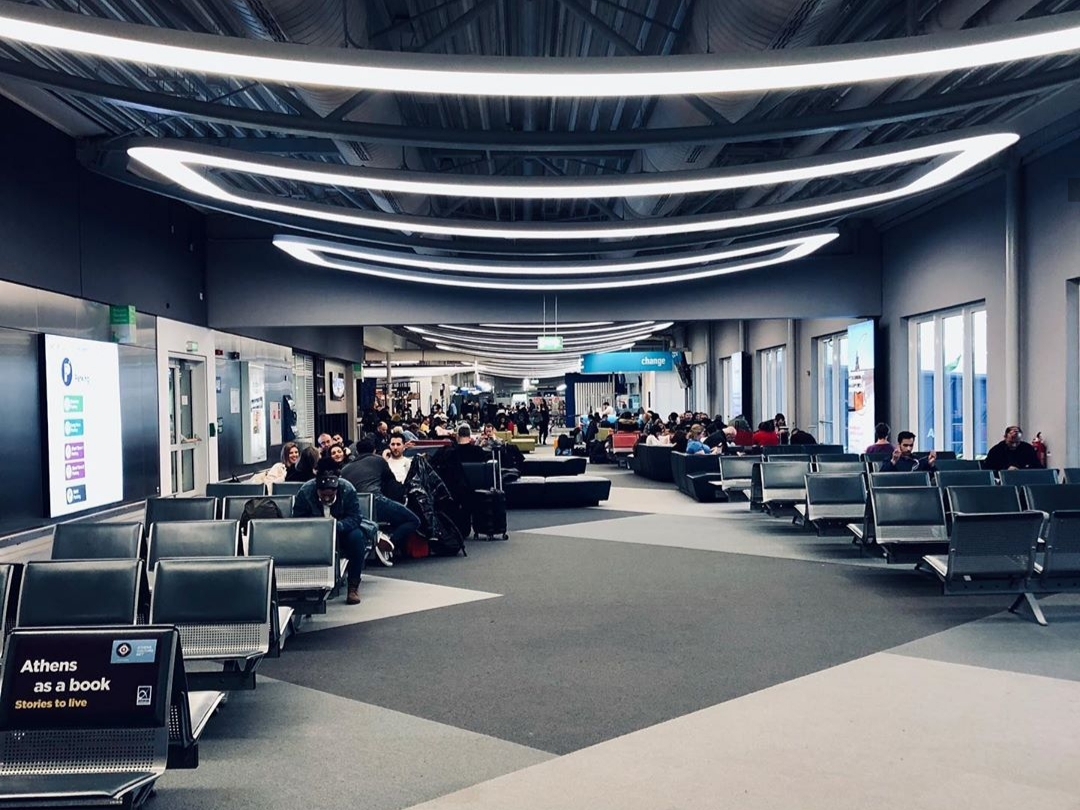
Waiting area

=== Overview ===
The airport currently has two terminals, the main terminal and the satellite terminal accessible by an underground link from the main terminal. It is designed to be extended in a modular approach over the ensuing years in order to accommodate increases in air travel. These extensions are planned in a six-phase framework. The first (and current) phase allowed the airport to accommodate 26 million passengers per year. When the airport originally opened, the current phase called for a capacity of only 16 million passengers per year; however, the capacity was able to increase without progressing to the next phase thanks to advanced IT logistics. The sixth and final expansion phase will allow the airport to accommodate an annual traffic of 50 million passengers, with the current layout leaving enough space for five more terminals to be added. As such, the parallel runway system currently in place has been designed to accommodate flight traffic with this high annual passenger load upon completion of the final expansion phase.

=== Main Terminal ===
The main terminal building handles all intra-Schengen flights, as well as several non-Schengen flights. All of the airport's 153 check-in desks are located in the Main Terminal and it has three separate levels, one for arrivals, one for departures and a food court level complete with a view of the eastern runway. Finally, the terminal is equipped with fourteen jet bridges and eleven belt conveyors for luggage.

- Hall A is used for flights to Non-schengen countries and Non-European countries.
- Hall B handles flights to Intra-schengen countries as well as domestic services.

In March 2018, the Athens International Airport issued a tender for its first physical expansion, concerning the south wings of the main terminal. The tender called for a building expansion with a total area of approximately 14,950 square meters over five levels (levels 0 to 4). The construction company to build the expansion was awarded in summer 2018, and the project was scheduled to be completed by mid-2019. It was to add 18 more counter check-in decks as well as additional space for arrivals, departures, security and an automated control gate. It also planned to add an expanded shopping area and new lounges by mid-2020.

=== Satellite Terminal ===
The satellite terminal has two levels, one for arrivals and the other for departures. It is easily accessible through an underground link complete with moving walkways. The terminal is equipped with ten jet bridges and is capable of handling annual traffic of six million passengers.

In recent years its parking stands were utilized for long-term storage of airliners, specifically two ex-Olympic Airways Airbus A340-300s (both aircraft were transferred to their new owner in February 2017) and a Boeing 767-300ER of defunct Greek start-up carrier SkyGreece Airlines. However, as of June 2017, the parking space of the satellite terminal is in full use for both Schengen and non-Schengen area flights and to accommodate increased traffic. From June 2017 some low-cost carriers were using it. On 24 May 2018, the Satellite Terminal officially restarted full operations.

== Airlines and destinations ==
The following airlines operate regular scheduled and charter flights at Athens Airport:

Airlines	Destinations
Aegean Airlines	Alexandria, Alexandroupoli, Amman–Queen Alia, Amsterdam, Baghdad, Barcelona, Beirut, Belgrade, Berlin, Bologna, Brussels, Bucharest–Otopeni, Budapest, Cairo, Casablanca Chania, Chios, Chișinău, Copenhagen, Corfu, Damascus (begins 2 December 2026), Dubai–International, Dublin, Düsseldorf, Edinburgh, Erbil, Frankfurt, Florence, Geneva, Hamburg, Helsinki, Heraklion, Ioannina, Istanbul, İzmir, Jeddah, Kavala, Kefalonia, Kos, Kraków, Larnaca, Lemnos, Lisbon, Ljubljana, London–Heathrow, Luxembourg, Madrid, Málaga, Malta, Manchester, Milan–Malpensa, Munich, Mykonos, Mytilene, Naples, Nice, Oslo, Paphos, Paris–Charles de Gaulle, Porto, Prague, Rhodes, Riyadh, Rome–Fiumicino, Rotterdam, Samos, Santorini, Skopje, Sofia, Stockholm–Arlanda, Strasbourg, Stuttgart, Tbilisi, Tel Aviv, Thessaloniki, Tirana, Tunis, Venice, Vienna, Warsaw–Chopin, Yerevan, Zagreb, Zurich; Seasonal: Abu Dhabi, Baku, Bari, Bilbao, Bordeaux, Catania, Dubrovnik, Hannover, Ibiza, Innsbruck, Kalamata, Lille, London–Gatwick, Luxor, Lyon, Marrakesh, Marseille, Nantes, Olbia, Palermo, Palma de Mallorca, Pisa, Podgorica, Riga, Seville, Sharm El Sheikh, Split, Tallinn, Toulouse, Valencia, Vilnius; Seasonal charter: Banja Luka, Sarajevo
Aer Lingus	Dublin
Air Algérie	Algiers (begins 24 December 2026)
Air Arabia	Sharjah
Air Cairo	Alexandria, Cairo
Air Canada	Seasonal: Montréal–Trudeau, Toronto–Pearson
Air China	Beijing–Capital
Air Europa	Seasonal: Madrid
Air France	Paris–Charles de Gaulle
Air Haifa	Haifa
Air Mediterranean	Damascus
Air Serbia	Belgrade; Seasonal: Niš
Air Transat	Seasonal: Toronto–Pearson
airBaltic	Riga, Tallinn
Alaska Airlines	Seasonal: Seattle/Tacoma (begins 12 May 2027)
American Airlines	Seasonal: Charlotte, Chicago–O'Hare, Dallas/Fort Worth, New York–JFK, Philadelphia
Animawings	Cluj-Napoca, Timișoara
Arkia	Tel Aviv
Austrian Airlines	Vienna
Bluebird Airways	Tel Aviv
British Airways	London–Heathrow
Brussels Airlines	Brussels
Bulgaria Air	Sofia
Condor	Seasonal: Frankfurt (begins 28 April 2027)
Croatia Airlines	Seasonal: Dubrovnik, Split, Zagreb
Cyprus Airways	Larnaca
Delta Air Lines	Seasonal: Atlanta, Boston, Detroit (begins 8 June 2027), New York–JFK
easyJet	Basel/Mulhouse, Bordeaux, Bristol, Edinburgh, Geneva, Lisbon, London–Gatwick, Lyon, Manchester, Milan–Malpensa, Naples, Nice, Paris–Orly; Seasonal: Alicante, Málaga, Palma de Mallorca
Egyptair	Cairo
El Al	Tel Aviv
Emirates	Dubai–International, Newark
Ethiopian Airlines	Addis Ababa
Etihad Airways	Abu Dhabi
Eurowings	Cologne/Bonn, Düsseldorf, Prague, Stuttgart
FlyErbil	Erbil
Gulf Air	Bahrain
Iberia	Madrid
IndiGo	Delhi, Mumbai
Israir	Tel Aviv
ITA Airways	Rome–Fiumicino
Jet2.com	Birmingham, London–Stansted, Manchester
Juneyao Air	Shanghai–Pudong
KLM	Amsterdam
Korean Air	Seasonal charter: Seoul–Incheon
LOT Polish Airlines	Warsaw–Chopin
Lufthansa	Frankfurt, Munich
MedSky Airways	Benghazi, Tripoli–Mitiga
Middle East Airlines	Beirut
Norse Atlantic Airways	Seasonal: New York–JFK
Norwegian Air Shuttle	Seasonal: Copenhagen, Helsinki, Oslo, Stockholm–Arlanda
Olympic Air	Ikaria, Karpathos, Kithira, Leros, Milos, Naxos, Paros, Sitia, Skiathos, Skyros, Zakynthos
Pegasus Airlines	Istanbul–Sabiha Gökçen
Qatar Airways	Doha
Royal Jordanian	Amman–Queen Alia
Ryanair	Bari, Bergamo, Bologna, Bratislava, Budapest, Charleroi, Dublin, Katowice, London–Stansted, Malta, Paphos, Rome–Fiumicino, Turin (begins 28 March 2027), Venice, Vienna, Warsaw–Modlin, Wrocław; Seasonal: Berlin, Catania, Chania, Cologne/Bonn, Corfu, Kraków, Lemnos, London–Luton, Santorini, Vilnius
Saudia	Riyadh; Seasonal: Jeddah
Scandinavian Airlines	Copenhagen, Stockholm–Arlanda; Seasonal: Gothenburg, Oslo
Scoot	Singapore
Sichuan Airlines	Chengdu–Tianfu, Istanbul
Sky Express	Alexandroupoli, Amsterdam, Astypalaia, Barcelona, Berlin, Brussels, Cairo (begins 2 December 2026), Chania, Chios, Corfu, Düsseldorf, Frankfurt, Hamburg, Heraklion, Ikaria, Istanbul, Kalymnos, Karpathos, Kastoria, Kefalonia, Kithira, Kos, Kozani, Larnaca, Lemnos, Lisbon, London–Gatwick, Lyon, Madrid, Milan–Malpensa, Milos, Munich, Mykonos, Mytilene, Naxos, Paris–Charles de Gaulle, Paros, Prague, Rhodes, Rome–Fiumicino, Samos, Santorini, Skiathos, Sofia, Syros, Tbilisi, Tel Aviv, Thessaloniki, Tirana, Vienna, Warsaw–Chopin, Yerevan, Zakynthos
SkyUp Airlines	Chișinău
Swiss International Air Lines	Geneva, Zurich
TAP Air Portugal	Lisbon
TAROM	Bucharest–Otopeni
Transavia	Amsterdam, Eindhoven, Marseille, Paris–Orly; Seasonal: Lyon, Montpellier, Nantes
TUI Airways	London–Gatwick (begins 28 March 2027)
Turkish Airlines	Istanbul
United Airlines	Seasonal: Chicago–O'Hare, Newark, Washington–Dulles
Volotea	Bordeaux, Lyon, Marseille, Nantes, Naples, Venice; Seasonal: Bari, Bilbao, Brest, Dubrovnik, Lille, Palermo, Split, Strasbourg, Toulouse, Verona
Vueling	Barcelona
Wizz Air	Bratislava, Bucharest–Băneasa, Budapest, Chișinău, Craiova, Gdańsk, Katowice, Kutaisi, Larnaca London–Luton, Tel Aviv, Tirana, Varna, Venice, Warsaw–Modlin
World2Fly	Seasonal charter: Madrid

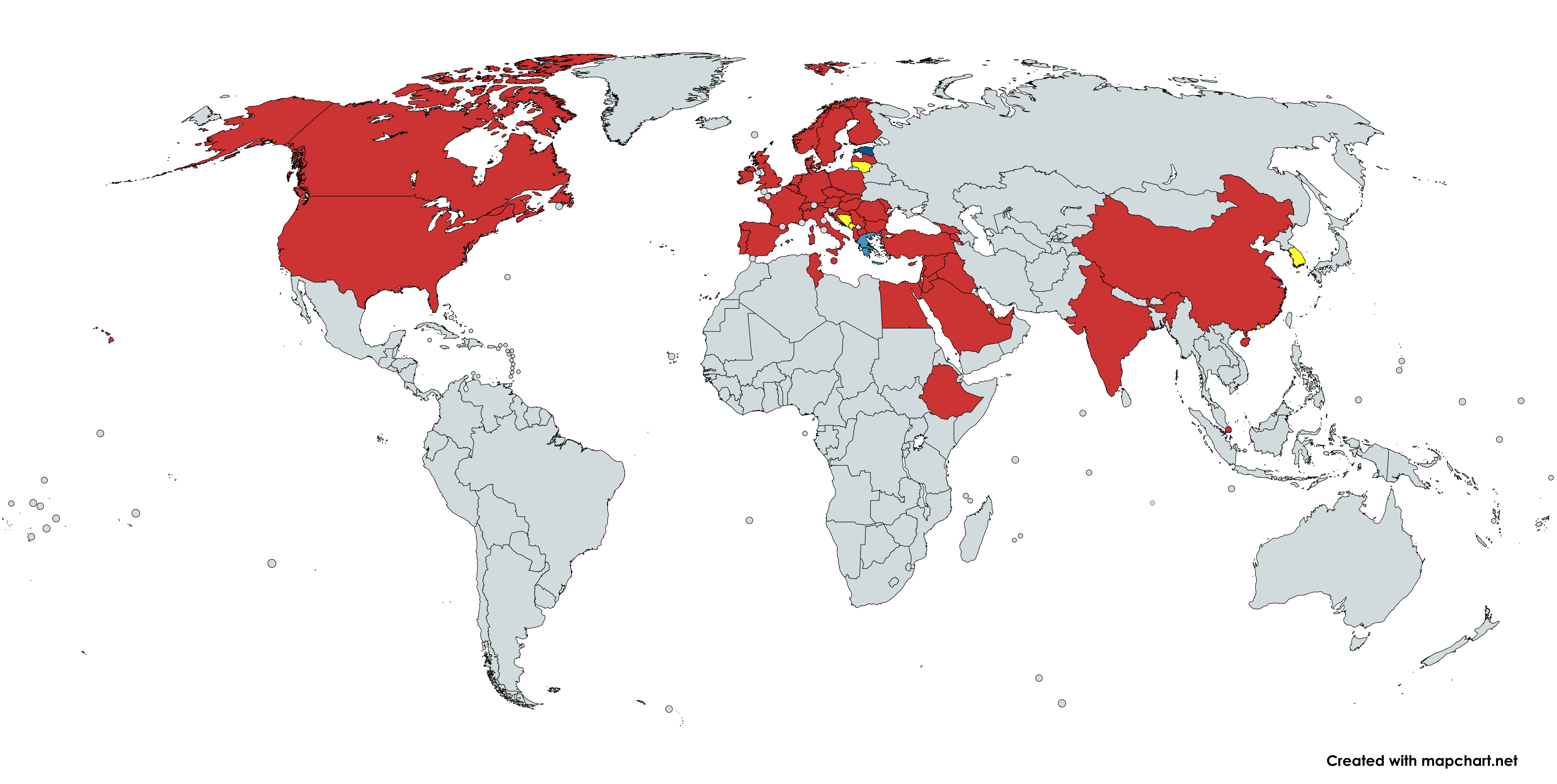
Athens International Airport - Destination Map (February 2026). Red shows regularly connected countries with both passenger and cargo operations. Light blue shows Greece, where the airport is located. Orange shows Hong Kong, the lone cargo-only country. Yellow shows seasonally linked countries. Blue shows Estonia, the country confirmed to be connected in the future.

== Statistics ==
Athens International Airport is the largest and busiest airport in Greece. By the end of 2025, it was the 15th-busiest airport in Europe.

=== Annual statistics ===
Passenger, aircraft movement and cargo statistics at El. Venizelos" airport: 2002–2025
Year	Passenger traffic	Passenger % change	Cargo handled (kg.)	Cargo % change	Aircraft movements	Aircraft % change
2002	11,827,448	n/a	106,813,249	n/a	159,467	n/a
2003	12,252,394	3.6 ▲	109,741,122	2.7 ▲	170,129	6.7 ▲
2004	13,662,332	11.5 ▲	118,999,247	8.4 ▲	191,048	12.3 ▲
2005	14,281,020	4.5 ▲	115,942,974	2.6 ▼	180,936	5.3 ▼
2006	15,079,708	5.6 ▲	120,174,745	3.6 ▲	190,872	5.6 ▲
2007	16,538,403	9.7 ▲	118,972,376	1.0 ▼	205,295	7.6 ▲
2008	16,466,491	0.4 ▼	122,195,965	2.7 ▲	199,418	2.9 ▼
2009	16,225,589	1.5 ▼	104,520,932	10.5 ▼	210,147	5.4 ▲
2010	15,411,099	5.0 ▼	96,676,103	7.5 ▼	191,766	8.7 ▼
2011	14,446,971	6.3 ▼	85,831,845	11.2 ▼	173,296	9.6 ▼
2012	12,944,041	10.4 ▼	76,424,557	11.0 ▼	153,295	11.5 ▼
2013	12,536,057	3.2 ▼	74,874,633	2.0 ▼	140,448	8.4 ▼
2014	15,196,369	21.2 ▲	77,337,956	3.3 ▲	154,530	10.0 ▲
2015	18,087,377	19.0 ▲	80,475,761	4.0 ▲	176,156	14.0 ▲
2016	20,016,998	10.7 ▲	88,477,196	9.9 ▲	189,137	7.4 ▲
2017	21,737,787	8.6 ▲	90,176,471	1.9 ▲	195,951	3.6 ▲
2018	24,135,736	11.0 ▲	92,573,026	3.1 ▲	217,094	10.8 ▲
2019	25,573,993	6.0 ▲	94,621,875	1.5 ▲	225,628	3.9 ▲
2020	8,078,394	68.4 ▼	75,783,363	19.4 ▼	112,415	50.2 ▼
2021	12,345,786	52.8 ▲	96,907,000	27.9 ▲	158,950	41.4 ▲
2022	22,728,750	84.1 ▲	106,103,811	6.8 ▲	213,352	34.2 ▲
2023	28,174,150	24.0 ▲	94,000,348	7.4 ▼	241,604	13.2 ▲
2024	31,854,761	13.1 ▲	124,960,801	32.9 ▲	268,301	11,0 ▲
2025	33,993,746	6.7 ▲	137,654,442	10.2 ▲	283,589	5.7 ▲
2026 (October)	30,520,513	4.1 ▲	—	n/a	252,452	3.3 ▲

=== Busiest passenger routes by country ===
The table below shows passenger totals at Athens International Airport by country destination during 2025, and changes compared to 2024.

Passenger traffic per country destination (2025)
Rank	Country destination	Passengers	Change %
0	Greece	9,631,244	▲2.2%
1	Italy	2,340,978	▲3.8%
2	Germany	2,181,236	▲1.2%
3	United Kingdom	2,048,728	▲4.7%
4	France	1,549,512	▲1.4%
5	Cyprus	1,520,226	▲8.5%
6	United States	1,432,506	▲19.5%
7	Turkey	1,309,572	▲10.5%
8	Israel	1,184,331	▲24.8%
9	Spain	1,164,366	▲14.8%
10	Switzerland	894,047	▲7.6%

=== Airline market share 2025 ===
Top airlines at Athens
Rank	Airline	Market share
1	Aegean Airlines	43.3%
1	Olympic Air	43.3%
2	Sky Express	12.9%
3	Ryanair	5.8%
4	Lufthansa	2.4%
5	Turkish Airlines	1.7%
6	EasyJet	1.6%
7	Delta Air Lines	1.5%
8	British Airways	1.4%
9	Swiss Air Lines	1.4%
10	Emirates	1.3%

=== Airline alliance market share 2025 ===
Top airlines alliances at Athens
Rank	Airline alliance	Market Share
1	Star Alliance	50.7%
2	SkyTeam	5.1%
3	Oneworld	4.1%
4	Non-allied carriers	40.1%

=== Passengers 2025 ===
Busiest European destinations from Athens Airport
Rank	Destination	Airport(s)	Passengers	Top carriers
1	London	LHR, LGW, STN	1,735,026	Aegean Airlines, British Airways, easyJet, Jet2.com, Ryanair, Sky Express, Wizz Air
2	Larnaca	LCA	1,379,786	Aegean Airlines, Cyprus Airways, Gulf Air, Sky Express, Wizz Air
3	Istanbul	IST, SAW	1,249,908	Aegean Airlines, Pegasus Airlines, Sky Express, Turkish Airlines
4	Paris	CDG, ORY	1,067,421	Aegean Airlines, Air France, easyJet, Sky Express, Transavia France
5	Rome	FCO, CIA	870,361	Aegean Airlines, ITA Airways, Ryanair, Sky Express
6	Milan	MXP, BGY	720,046	Aegean Airlines, easyJet, Ryanair, Sky Express, Wizz Air
7	Munich	MUC	705,908	Aegean Airlines, Lufthansa, Sky Express
8	Frankfurt	FRA	697,385	Aegean Airlines, Lufthansa, Sky Express
9	Amsterdam	AMS	671,713	Aegean Airlines, KLM, Sky Express, Transavia
10	Zurich	ZRH	527,396	Aegean Airlines, Swiss Air Lines

Busiest intercontinental destinations from Athens Airport
Rank	Destination	Airport(s)	Passengers	Carriers
1	Tel Aviv	TLV	1,148,747	Aegean Airlines, Arkia, Bluebird Airways, El Al, Israir, Ryanair, Sky Express, Wizz Air
2	New York	JFK, EWR	721,378	American Airlines, Delta Air Lines, Emirates, Norse Atlantic Airways, United Airlines
3	Cairo	CAI	372,496	Aegean Airlines, EgyptAir
4	Doha	DOH	312,561	Qatar Airways
5	Dubai	DXB	300,166	Aegean Airlines, Emirates
6	Montreal	YUL	225,141	Air Canada, Air Transat
7	Toronto	YYZ	219,386	Air Canada, Air Transat
8	Abu Dhabi	AUH	196,336	Aegean Airlines, Etihad Airways, Wizz Air
9	Chicago	ORD	167,424	American Airlines, United Airlines
10	Atlanta	ATL	164,763	Delta Air Lines

Busiest domestic destinations from Athens Airport
Rank	Destination	Region	Airport	Passengers	Carriers
1	Thessaloniki	Macedonia	SKG	1,627,599	Aegean Airlines, Sky Express
2	Heraklion	Crete	HER	1,491,084	Aegean Airlines, Sky Express, Volotea
3	Santorini	South Aegean	JTR	1,059,151	Aegean Airlines, Ryanair, Sky Express, Volotea
4	Chania	Crete	CHQ	817,443	Aegean Airlines, Ryanair, Sky Express
5	Rhodes	South Aegean	RHO	742,336	Aegean Airlines, Sky Express
6	Mykonos	South Aegean	JMK	462,519	Aegean Airlines, Sky Express, Volotea
7	Corfu	Ionian Islands	CFU	409,275	Aegean Airlines, Ryanair, Sky Express
8	Paros	South Aegean	PAS	351,706	Olympic Air, Sky Express
9	Mytilene	North Aegean	MJT	335,146	Aegean Airlines, Sky Express
10	Alexandroupolis	Thrace	AXD	315,743	Aegean Airlines, Sky Express

== Ground transport ==
=== Railway and Metro ===
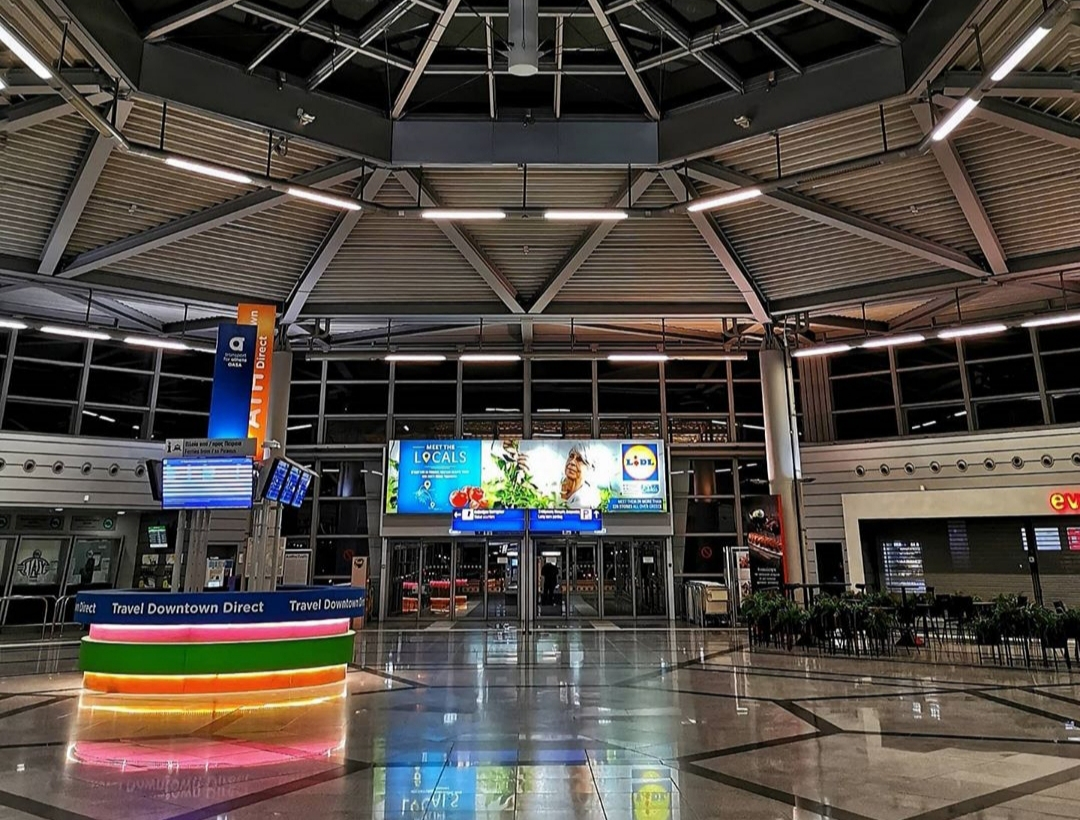
Metro station

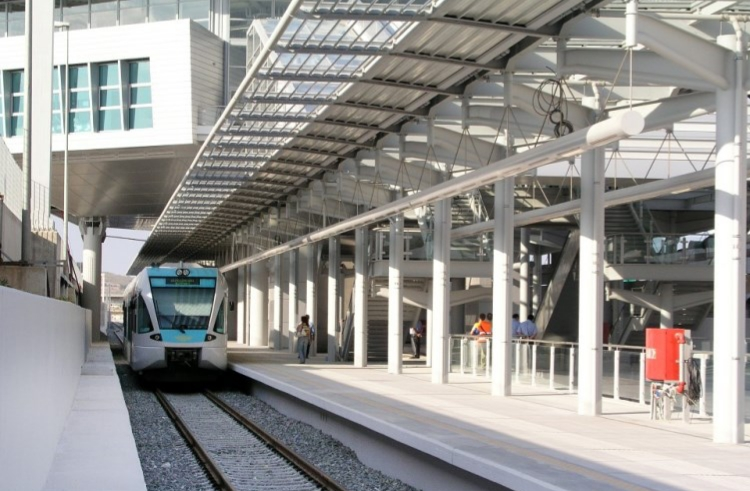
Station's platforms

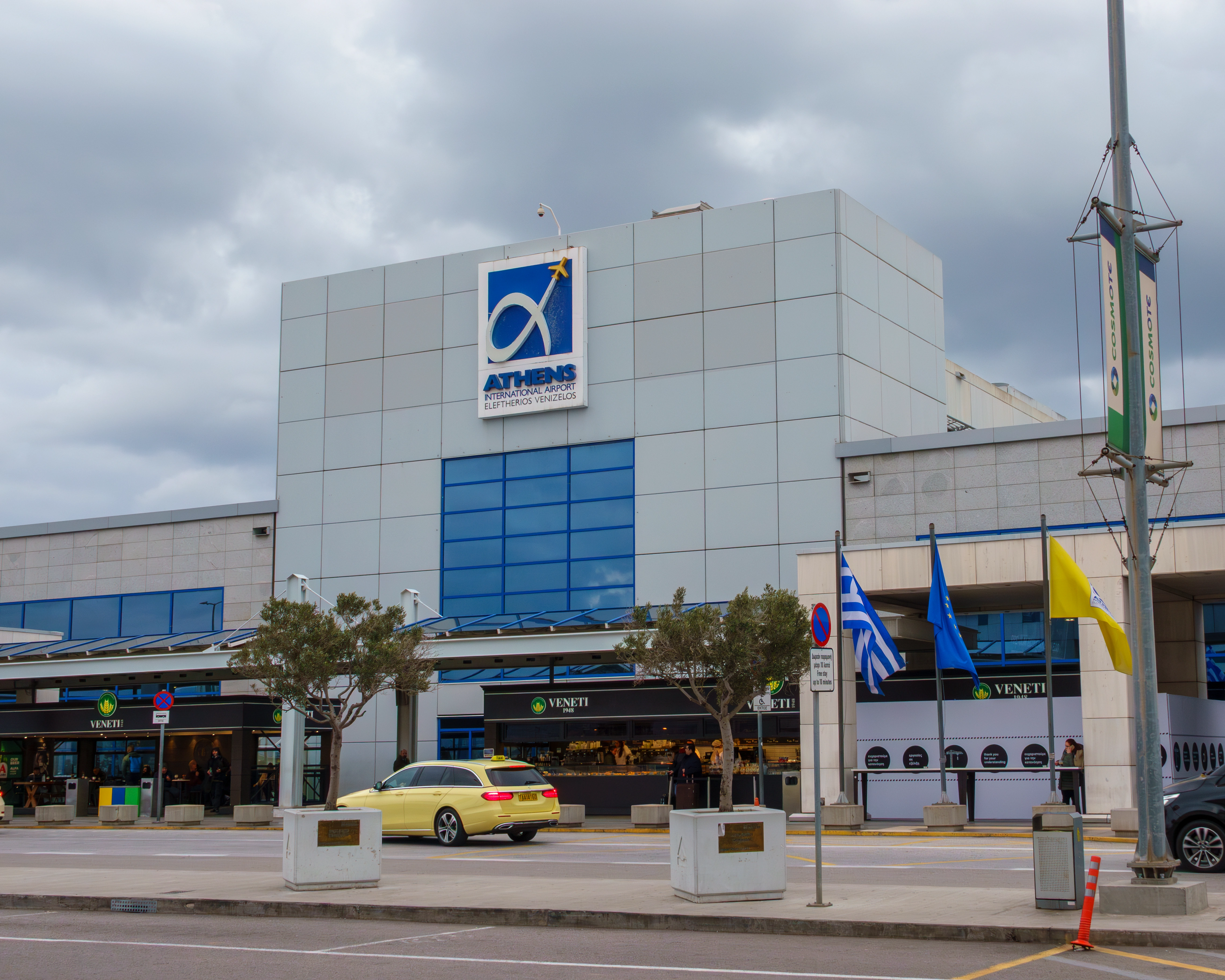
Taxi available at exit

A railway station is immediately adjacent to the airport terminal, accessible by an elevated walkway. Athens Metro line 3 and the suburban railway service Proastiakos run trains to and from this station.

=== Road ===
The airport is accessible by the Attiki Odos toll highway from the centre and northern Athens, Varis-Koropiou Avenue from the western part, Laurio Ave. from the South, and Spata-Loutsa Avenue from the East. A variety of parking options are available on site at the airport in three different parking lots. Located at the arrivals level, opposite the airport terminal, the airport offers short-term parking for up to five hours with 1,357 parking spaces available in lots P1 and P2. Long-term parking is located across the airport's main access road (Attiki Odos) with 5,802 parking spaces in lot P3. A free shuttle bus is available to transport passengers, while the lots are also accessible by foot to the terminal. Premium valet service is also offered at the Departures level by Entrance 3.

=== Taxi ===
Taxis are available at the designated taxi waiting area located at exit 3 of the arrivals level.

=== Bus ===
Transport for Athens bus lines connect directly to the Athens greater area. Other buses serve the wider region. Buses disembark passengers at the departures level and depart from the arrivals level between exits 4 and 5. Regional bus services by KTEL Express operate to the airport, currently connecting the airport to Rafina, Markopoulo, Lavrio, Kalyvia and Keratea.

== Other facilities ==
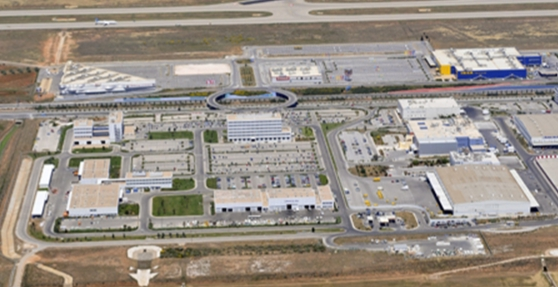
Aerial view of the retail park

- Aegean Airlines and Olympic Air have their head office on the airport property.
- The Air Accident Investigation and Aviation Safety Board is based at the airport.
- The Greek fast food company Goody's S.A. has its head office at the airport.
- Two robotic systems, named Hercules and Ulysses, are used by the airport for the handling of potentially dangerous materials. They were donated by the Stavros Niarchos Foundation.

== See also ==
- List of the busiest airports in Greece
- Transport in Greece
