= Adrián Villar Rojas =

Argentinian sculptor

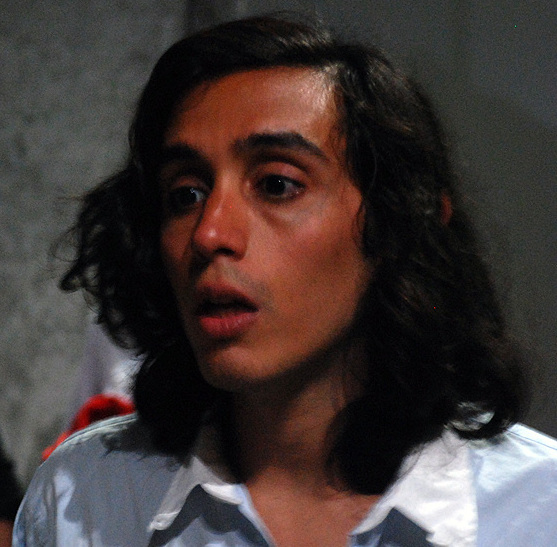
Adrián Villar Rojas

Adrián Villar Rojas (born 1980 in Rosario, Argentina) is an Argentinian sculptor known for his elaborate fantastical works which explore notions of the Anthropocene and the end of the world. In his dream like installations he uses aspects of drawing, sculpture, video and music to create immersive situations in which the spectator is confronted with ideas and images of their imminent extinction.

== Early life and education ==
Villar Rojas was raised and educated in Rosario. He studied Fine Arts at the National University of Rosario, Argentina.

== Career ==
Villar Rojas works with a production team that travels to form a nomadic studio for each new project to whom he refers to as his "theater company". His works are predominantly destroyed at the end of each exhibition yet somehow they remain alive though remnants that are carried over into subsequent works.

Villar Rojas' work has been exhibited at the Louvre Museum, MoMA PS1, Serpentine Sackler Gallery, Museum Haus Konstruktiv, the High Line, Moderna Museet, Fondazione Sandretto Re Rebaudengo, Metropolitan Museum of Art (Roof Garden Commission), Kunsthaus Bregenz, the National Observatory of Athens and the Geffen Contemporary at MOCA. He has also participated in the New Museum Triennial, documenta 13 the 9th Shanghai Biennale in 2012; the 12 and 14 Istanbul Biennale in 2011 and 2015 and the 12th Biennale of Havana, Cuba, the 12th Sharjah Biennale in UAE in 2015 and the 6th Marrakesh Biennale in 2016.

In 2014 Villar Rojas represented Argentina at the 54th edition of the Venice Biennale with The Murderer of Your Heritage, a large scale installation located in the Artigliere in Arsenale. His project consisted of a group of oversized site-specific sculptures made of clay over a framework of cement, burlap and wood.

Villar Rojas' work The Most Beautiful of All Mothers was exhibited offshore in the Sea of Marmara off the island of Büyükada and in front of the Turkish home in exile of Leon Trotsky as part of the 2015 Istanbul Biennial. His effort was the most talked about work on social media of any effort at the exhibition.

In 2017, Villar Rojas was commissioned by the Metropolitan Museum of Art in New York City for a sculptural installation for its ongoing series of exhibitions of contemporary works on the institution's roof. Therein Villar Rojas created The Theater of Disappearance which is a dinner party like mash up sculptural outlay reproducing digitally scanned objects from the museum's own collection. This was one of four exhibitions sharing the same title, all of which opened within 2017 at The Metropolitan Museum of Art, New York, at Kunsthaus Bregenz, Vorarlberg, Austria, at the National Observatory of Athens, commissioned and organized by NEON Organization, and the Geffen Contemporary at MOCA, Los Angeles.

For a project in Athens commissioned by non-profit NEON, Villar Rojas reworked the grounds of the National Observatory of Athens which sits atop the Hill of the Nymphs. Curated by NEON Director Elina Kountouri, he introduced 46,000 plants from 26 species, converting a previously unused area into a cultivated zone. Eleven vitrines contained sculptural installations referencing historical conquest and territorial expansion, both on Earth and beyond.

In 2025, the Aspen Art Museum (AAM) and Audemars Piguet co-commissioned Villar Rojas with a sculpture in the Jura Mountains.

== Art market ==
Villar Rojas is represented by Kurimanzutto and Marian Goodman.

== Awards ==
- Benesse Prize (2011) for his site-specific installation The Murdered of Your Heritage (2011), Argentine Pavilion, Arsenale during the 54th International Art Exhibition of the Venice Biennale.
- Zurich Art Prize (2013) awarded by the Museum Haus Konstruktiv and Zurich Insurance Group Ltd.
- Sharjah Biennial Prize (2015) for Planetarium (2015), a large-scale site-specific intervention in the former ice factory of Kalba on the East Coast of Sharjah during the 12th Sharjah Biennial.
- Prix Canson (2015) for his work on paper.
- Konex Award (2012 and 2022) for his work on sculptures and installations.

In 2020, Villar Rojas was shortlisted for the Hugo Boss Prize.

== Solo exhibitions ==
- 2017
  - The Theater of Disappearance. The Geffen Contemporary at MOCA, Los Angeles, United States.
  - The Theater of Disappearance. NEON, Athens National Observatory, Athens, Greece.
  - From the series The Theater of Disappearance, Marian Goodman Gallery, London, United Kingdom.
  - The Theater of Disappearance. Kunsthaus Bregenz, Bregenz, Austria.
  - The Theater of Disappearance. The Metropolitan Museum of Art, Cantor Roof Garden Commission, New York, United States.
- 2015
  - Fantasma. Moderna Museet, Stockholm, Sweden.
  - Two Suns. Marian Goodman Gallery, New York, United States.
  - Rinascimento. Fondazione Sandretto Re Rebaudengo, Torino, Italy.
- 2014
  - The Evolution of God. High Line at the Rail Yards, New York, United States.
  - Lo Que El Fuego Me Trajo: a Film by Adrian Villar Rojas. Marian Goodman Gallery, Paris, France.
  - Los Teatros de Saturno. kurimanzutto, Mexico City, Mexico.
  - The Real DMZ Project. Artsonje Center and other locations, Seoul, South Korea
- 2013
  - Adrián Villar Rojas: La inocencia de los animales. Expo 1, MoMA PS1, New York, United States.
  - Adrián Villar Rojas: The work of the ocean. Foundation de 11 Lijnen, Oudenburg, Belgium.
  - Today We Reboot the Planet. Serpentine (Sackler Gallery), London, United Kingdom.
  - Films Before Revolution. Museum Haus Konstruktiv, Zurich, Switzerland.
- 2012
  - Return the world. dOCUMENTA (13), Kassel, Germany.
  - Before my birth. Arts Brookfield with the New Museum Triennial “The Ungovernables”. World Financial Center Plaza, New York, United States.
- 2011
  - El asesino de tu herencia (The Murderer of Your Heritage). 54th Biennale di Venezia, Argentinian Pavilion, Venice, Italy.
  - Poems for Earthlings. SAM ART Projects, Jardin des Tuileries, Musée du Louvre, Paris, France.
- 2010
  - Un beso infinito (An Infinite Kiss). Casas Riegner Gallery, Bogotá, Colombia.
  - Mi abuelo muerto (My Dead Grandfather). Akademie der Künste, Berlin, Germany.
- 2009
  - El momento más hermoso de la guerra no sabe distinguir el amor de cualquier sentimiento (The Most Beautiful Moment of War Cannot Distinguish Love from Any Other Feeling). X Bienal de Cuenca, Cuenca, Ecuador.
  - Mi familia muerta (My Dead Family). II Bienal del Fin del Mundo, Ushuaia, Argentina.
- 2008
  - Lo que el fuego me trajo. Ruth Benzacar Art Gallery, Buenos Aires, Argentina.
- 2007
  - 15.000 años nuevos. Belleza y Felicidad, Buenos Aires, Argentina.
  - Diario íntimo 3D. Centro Cultural Borges, Buenos Aires, Argentina.
- 2006
  - Estas son las probabilidades de que te pase algo. El Poste Galería, Centro Cultural Ricardo Rojas, Buenos Aires, Argentina.
- 2005
  - Un mar. Alianza Francesa de Buenos Aires & Ruth Benzacar Galería de Arte, Buenos Aires, Argentina.
- 2004
  - Incendio. Ruth Benzacar Galería de Arte, Buenos Aires, Argentina.

== Bibliography ==
- Hans Ulrich Obrist, Carolyn Christov-Bakargiev, Eungie Joo, Adrián Villar Rojas, Phaidon, 2020
