= Old Paros National Airport =

Abandoned airport in Paros, Greece

Paros National Airport "Panteleou Paros Airport"
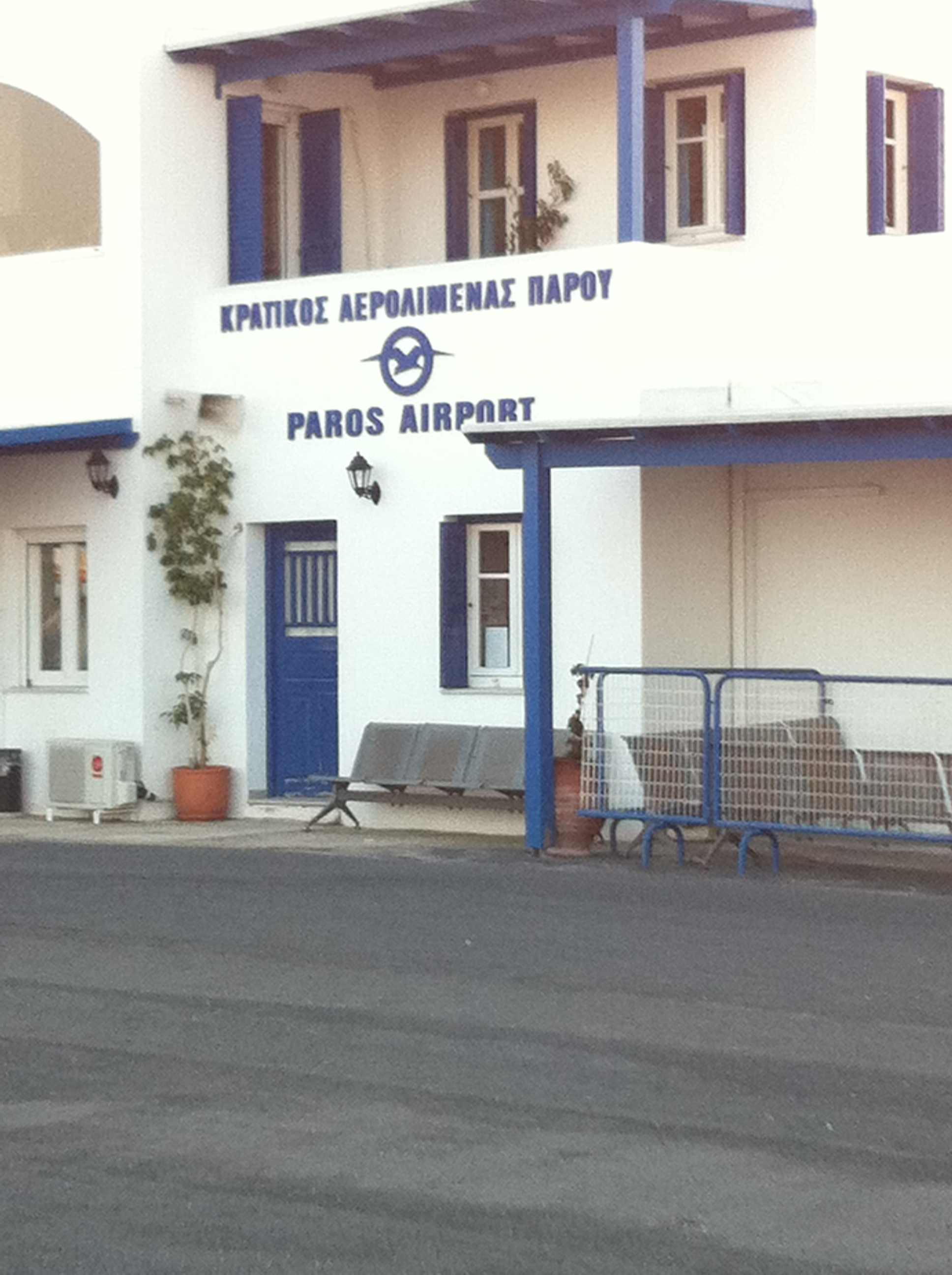
- IATA: ~~PAS~~; ICAO: LGPA

Summary
- Airport type: Public
- Owner: Greek State
- Operator: HCAA
- Serves: Parikia
- Location: Alyki
- Elevation AMSL: 121 ft / 37 m
- Coordinates: 37°00′40.32″N 25°07′40.80″E

Map
- Location of airport in Greece

Runways
Direction	Length		Surface
Direction	ft	m	Surface
~~17/35~~	~~2,778~~	~~850~~	Asphalt

Statistics (2015)
- Passengers: 43,182
- Passenger traffic change: ▲8.3%
- Aircraft movements: 2,266
- Aircraft movements change: ▲1.8%
- Sources:HCAA, Runway data

Paros National Airport was an airport in Paros, Greece, in the Cyclades islands region (IATA: ~~PAS~~, ICAO: LGPA). The airport was located in the southwestern part of the island, about 10 kilometers from the port of Parikia. it was replaced by the New Paros Airport on 25 July 2016.

== History ==
The airport was opened on October 5, 1982, on land made available by Nikolas Panteleou, hence its secondary name "Panteleou Paros Airport". Operation of the airport began as a municipal airport with a dirt runway and a small building covering 80 square meters. The year 1985 saw the construction of a paved runway. The terminal building was a single story building. In 1987 this building was renovated and an additional floor was added, housing the Hellenic Civil Aviation Authority and the MHL (Meteorological Service). In 1989, the airport became a national airport. In 2016, all operations were transferred to the new airport.

The airport has been replaced by the New Paros Airport which became fully operational on 25 July 2016. Olympic Air has undertaken to cover half of the new terminal building's budget.

== Statistics ==
Annual passenger throughput - 13-year history

Year	Flights	Passengers	Passengers Change
2001	1,668	23,388	▼45.1%
2002	826	10,805	▼53.8%
2003	1,492	22,609	▲109.2%
2004	1,651	32,401	▲43.3%
2005	1,558	33,587	▲3,7%
2006	1,641	37,339	▲11.17%
2007	1,651	37,017	▼0.9%
2008	1,434	31,986	▼13.6%
2009	1,526	30,722	▼4.0%
2010	1,800	34,204	▲11.3%
2011	1,914	36,271	▲6.1%
2012	2,232	35,311	▼2.7%
2013	2,220	36,429	▲3,1%

== See also ==
- Transport in Greece
