= Spata =

Town in the Athens metropolitan area, Greece

Spata Σπάτα
- Municipal unit
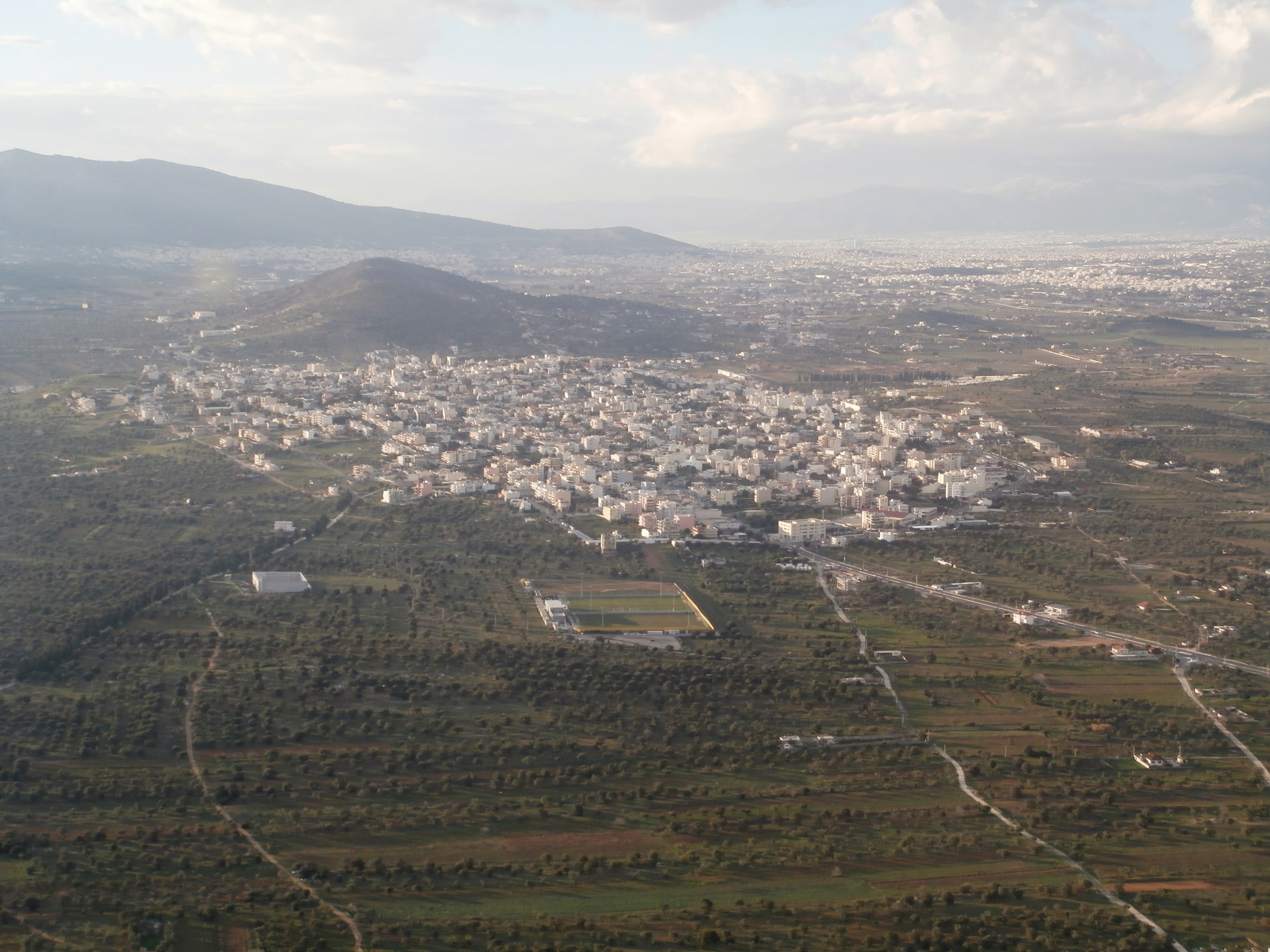
- Aerial view of Spata with Athens in the background

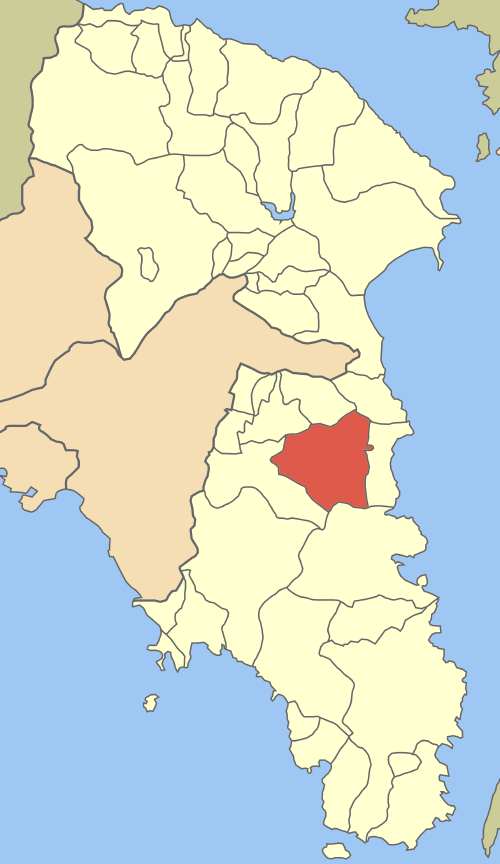
- Location within the regional unit

- Location within Greece
- Coordinates: 37°58′N 23°55′E
- Country: Greece
- Administrative region: Attica
- Regional unit: East Attica
- Municipality: Spata-Artemida

Area
  - Municipal unit: 55.042 km^{2} (21.252 sq mi)
- Elevation: 150 m (490 ft)

Population (2021)
  - Municipal unit: 12,991
  - Municipal unit density: 236.02/km^{2} (611.29/sq mi)
- Time zone: UTC+2 (EET)
  - Summer (DST): UTC+3 (EEST)
- Postal code: 190 04
- Area code: 210
- Vehicle registration: Z
- Website: www.spata.gr

Spata (Greek: Σπάτα) is a town 20 kilometres (12 mi) east of downtown Athens, Greece. Since the 2011 local government reform it is part of the municipality Spata-Artemida, of which it is the seat and a municipal unit. The municipal unit (officially named Spata-Loutsa) has an area of 55.042 km^{2}. It is part of the Athens metropolitan area.

== Geography and economy ==
Spata is situated in the middle of the Mesogeia plain, east of Mount Hymettus and west of the Aegean Sea coast. Athens International Airport ("Eleftherios Venizelos") covers the eastern portion of Spata. It is located southeast of Pallini, southwest of Rafina, west of Artemida and about 22 kilometres (14 mi) east south east of Athens city center.

The town proper is made up of residential neighborhoods. Farmland, mostly vineyards and olive groves, lie around. Retsina wine was the traditional cash crop of the whole area, complemented with olives and olive oil, figs, almonds, pistachios, and wheat. Nowadays viticulture is dwindling as a mass occupation, albeit supplanted by the emergence of many modern wineries that mostly specialize in vinifying the local Savatiano grape. The bulk of the grape and wine business is handled by the local co-operative. In 1995, the southern portion was committed to construction of the new Athens International Airport, which was completed in March 2001. The Attica Zoological Park, or "Attica Zoo", opened in May 2001 and is Athens' and Greece's largest zoo.

Spata has five kindergartens, three elementary schools, two secondary schools, a police station, Post Office, several bank offices, and a junior football/soccer team, Aittitos (Invincible). The training facilities of AEK FC are also located there.

The municipal unit of Spáta also incorporates various small exurbs: Agía Kyriakí, Neápoli, Ágios Ioánnis, Velanidiá, Christoúpolis, Foínikas, Étos Stéko, Ágios Nikólaos Boúra, and Ímeros Péfkos.

== History ==
The area included the ancient Athenian demes of Erkhiá (Ερχιά), the birthplace of the historian and general Xenophon, and Kýthēros (Κύθηρος); a Mycenean cemetery was excavated at the southern edge of town by Panagiotis Stamatakis in the 1870s, the exhibits being hosted in the National Archaeological Museum of Athens. Evidence of small ancient settlements abound in the area, the most notable being the Neolithic fortified settlement on Zágani hill. Several of these were excavated during works for the airport and are being exhibited in the main airport building.

Since the Middle Ages, Spata has been inhabited mainly by Arvanites. The town (then village) was re-populated by the medieval Tosk Albanian clan of Spata around the 15th century, after they emigrated from Epirus. It was named after John Spata, who was despot of Arta in the 14th century. His name derives from Albanian shpatë (def. and pl. shpata).

The patron saints of the town are Peter and Paul, celebrated on July 29 at the Byzantine chapel of the same name, located near the eastern edge of the town. The feast is accompanied by the medieval custom of the distribution of the stifado, a beef-and-onions stew cooked overnight in cauldrons and distributed to the faithful outside the chapel after Mass.

== Economy ==
Olympic Air has its head office in Athens International Airport in Spata. Goody's S.A., a Greek fast food company, is also headquartered at the airport.

== Government and infrastructure ==
The Air Accident Investigation and Aviation Safety Board has an office at the airport.

== Historical population ==
Year	Town population	Municipal unit population
1981	6,398	-
1991	6,725	7,796
2001	8,167	10,419
2011	9,198	12,333
2021	9,453	12,991
