= Artemida, Attica =

Artemida Αρτέμιδα
- Municipal unit
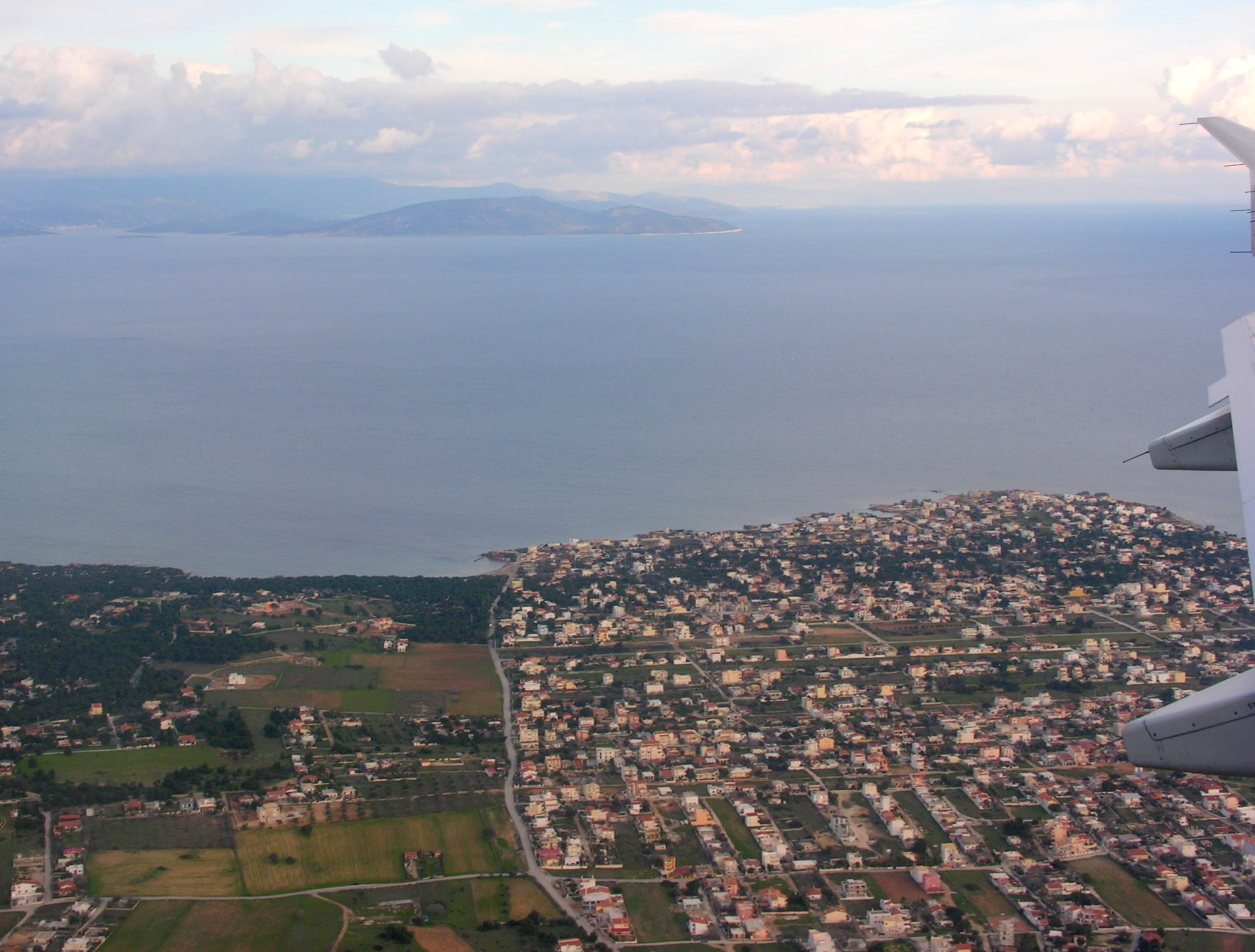

- Location within the regional unit

- Location within Greece
- Coordinates: 37°58′N 24°0′E
- Country: Greece
- Administrative region: Attica
- Regional unit: East Attica
- Municipality: Spata-Artemida

Area
  - Municipal unit: 18.653 km^{2} (7.202 sq mi)
- Elevation: 2 m (6.6 ft)

Population (2021)
  - Municipal unit: 21,924
  - Municipal unit density: 1,175.4/km^{2} (3,044.2/sq mi)
- Time zone: UTC+2 (EET)
  - Summer (DST): UTC+3 (EEST)
- Postal code: 190 16
- Area code: 22940
- Vehicle registration: Z, I

Artemida (Greek: Αρτέμιδα, before 1977: Λούτσα Loutsa) is an eastern suburb of Athens located in the East Attica regional unit of Greece. Since the 2011 local government reform it is part of the municipality Spata-Artemida, of which it is a municipal unit. The municipal unit has an area of 18.653 km^{2}.

== History ==
The city was named after the ancient goddess Artemis. The Temple of Artemis Brauron was among the most important sacred sites in the ancient times. Vravrona (or Brauron), about 20 km from Athens, was one of the 12 towns of Attica that was united to Athens by Theseus.
The ancient temple of Artemis is of Doric style and flourished in the 5th-4th century B.C. According to a myth, this is the temple where Iphigeneia was brought by her brother Orestes, when they met in the land of Tauris, where she served as a priestess in a local temple of Artemis. Iphigeneia had been transferred to Tauris by goddess Artemis herself, when she saved her from the sacrifice in Aulis. Returning to Greece, Iphigeneia brought with her a wooden statue of Artemis from Tauris.

== Geography ==
Artemida is located on the Aegean Sea coast, in the eastern part of the Attica peninsula. It lies 5 km south of Rafina, 8 km east of Spata, 9 km north of Porto Rafti and 25 km east of Athens city centre. Greek National Road 85 (Rafina - Lavrio) passes through the town.

== Historical population ==
Year	Population
1981	4,249
1991	9,485
2001	17,391
2011	21,488
2021	21,924

== See also ==
- List of municipalities of Attica
