= Goody's Burger House =

Greek fast food company

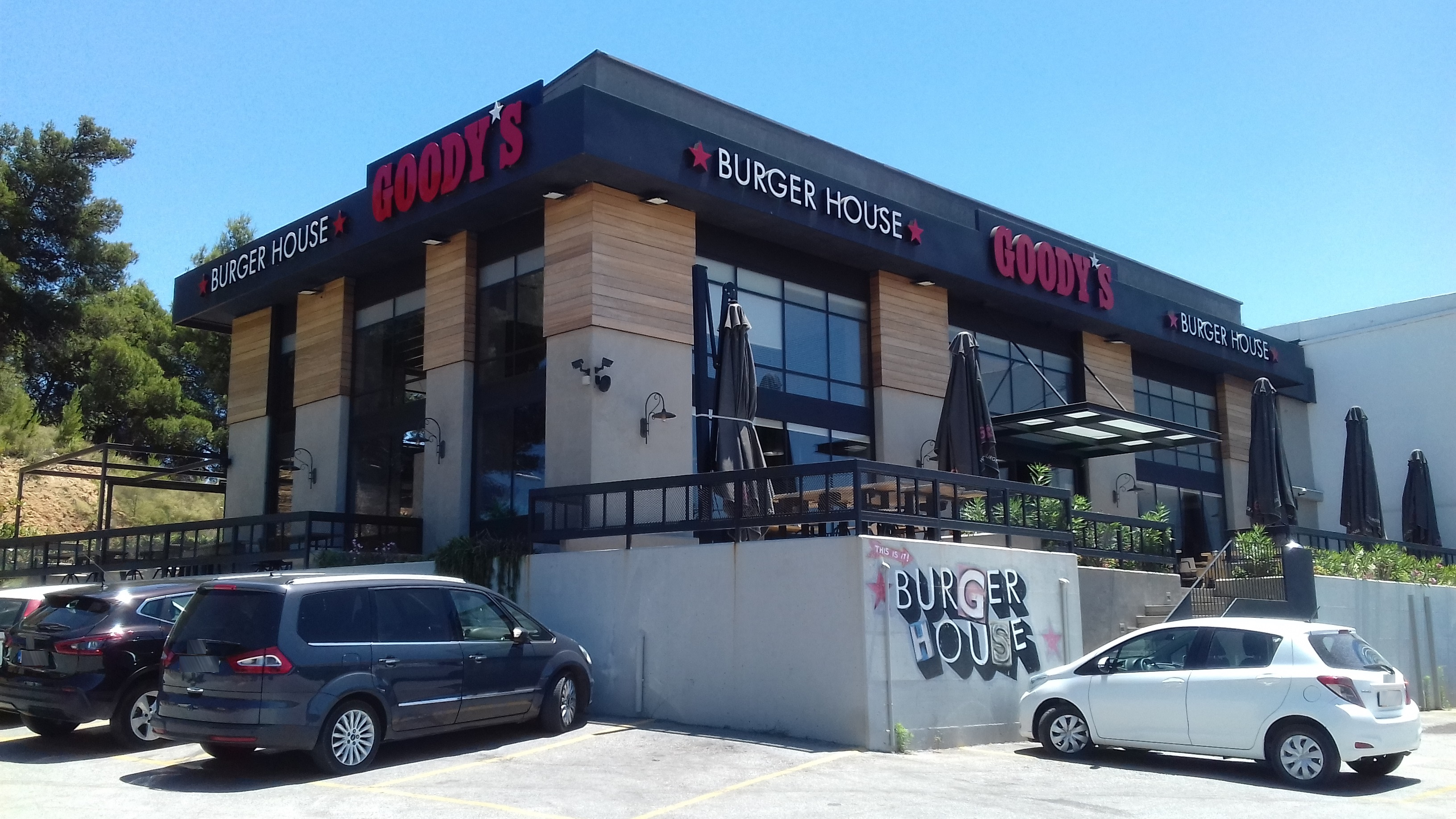
- Type: Subsidiary
- Industry: Food and beverage
- Founded: 20 Mar 1973; 53 years ago
- Founder: Achilleas Folias, Ioannis Dionysiadis, Nikos Pappas
- Headquarters: Eleftherios Venizelos International Airport; Spata, Attica, Greece
- Area served: Greece, Saudi Arabia, Cyprus, Australia, Armenia, Albania, Mayotte, North Macedonia
- Key people: Athanasios Papanikolaou, CEO | Everest Group of Companies
- Parent: Vivartia S.A.
- Website: www.goodys.com

Goody's Burger House S.A. is a Greek fast food company. Headquartered in Spata, it is the country's leading fast food chain.

== History ==
Goody's was founded in 1973 by Ioannis Dionisiadis, Achilleas Folias and Nikolaos Pappas in Thessaloniki.

In July 2001, after a hostile acquisition, Delta Holding S.A. became the major stakeholder in the company. In September 2006, Goody's along with Delta and a few more companies, started working under the umbrella of a parent company named Vivartia, owned by the Marfin Investment Group. It is now a subsidiary of Vivartia S.A.

In January 31, 2014, Goody's changed its name to Goody's Burger House, though some of its stores still retain the previous branding. The company has also released a child-friendly brand of meals, called Junior Goody's.

== Stores ==
These are the 150 stores of Goody's as of 2 December 2024:

Country	Stores
Greece	141
Cyprus	2
North Macedonia	2
Armenia	2
Saudi Arabia	1
Romania	0 (Failed business)

== Advertising ==
- Goody's has been a major sponsor for the MAD Video Music Awards.
- In an episode of the fifth season of the reality show Survivor Greece, Goody's burgers were given as prizes.

=== Junior Goody's media tie-ins ===
- Dragon Ball
- Shrek 2
- Gadget & the Gadgetinis
- Playmobil (2011)
- Rio - contest with seven-day trip to Rio de Janeiro as prize; coinciding with the home video releases of the film. (2011)
- Looney Tunes - 10 figures for Christmas tree decoration, given with every meal. (2012)

=== Television commercials ===
- 2D hand-drawn animated commercial directed by Costas Kapakas (Peppermint). A man is constantly asking where do the strangers seen in the commercial go to eat. Their answer is "Goody's", and as soon as the said man smells some of the food shown, he doesn't resist. (1984)
- Tria Poulakia - Three birds are shown as a metaphor for buying a burger, potato chip and a Coca-Cola drink. 2D hand drawn animation by Giannis Georgariou. Animation by MAGIKON for production company Cinegram.
- Teddy Bears Factory - Commercial promoting ArGOODaki, in which a man resembling Santa Claus is seen making talking teddy bears in a factory of his. Produced by Cinegram, and directed by Dimitris Katsikis.
- Eimai Enas Allos - Commercial starring Nino Xypolitas being followed by crowds of people; featuring the same-named song.

Topcut+Modiano Athens has also contributed as the production house for other Goody's commercials.

- Bitates - During a game of poker inside a hair salon of Arabian descent, a group of people enter the room where it takes place, as they meet up with a bearded man with sunglasses, known as Johnny the Excellent. They proceed by endlessly shooting with their guns, as the poker game comes apart. It turns out at the end that Johnny wasn't shot once, as he had a potato chip from a type of french fries called Bitates (the product promoted in the commercial). The commercial ends with the said people tied up, while the poker players eat Bitates at a Goody's restaurant, and jokingly entice the former to eat. Directed by George Bolanos.
- Pita Pita - A music video clip where auto mechanics, technicians and builders sing about Pita Pita (pita souvlaki with pork). Directed by Vangelis Liberopoulos.
- Music Awards - While eating at a Goody's restaurant, a man starts hearing sounds made by people moving their seats, drinking their juice, working at the kitchen etc. A contest is advertised, in which customers, with buying a burger and a Coca-Cola drink, could enter a contest to win among other prizes, VIP invitations for the 2004 MAD Video Music Awards, whose sponsors included Goody's. The commercial ends with the said man clapping his hands, and other customers gazing at him. Directed by Yan Vogel.
- Goody's Club - A person with his face hidden behind his long hair walks down the streets of Athens to enter a Goody's restaurant and order a club sandwich. Produced for Fortune Advertising SA. Music by Rabbeats. Winner of an Ermis Gold award. (2004)
- Balloon - Clips of people doing cheerful activities are seen, as others record the laughter sounds made by the former, play them through a system of speakers connected with a fabric in order to inflate it, and drag it outside. One of the latter pops the balloon with a pin, as all the said laughter is scattered. Produced in association with ABL Film Production for Fortune Advertising SA. Music by Rabbeats.
- Series of commercials advertising the Goody's Delivery Service, in which people are doing various activities in their home, while a text appears: "Because sometimes you just can't go to Goody's." Directed by Vardis Marinakis and produced in association with ABL Film Production for Fortune Advertising SA. Winner of a Grand Ermis Best Campaign of the Year award.
  - A young couple is having fun kissing each other. Production design by Harlour.
- Epic - Directed by Vassilis Bourantas for Rascal and Cream. Starring actors from Attitude Actors. Cinematography by Thodoris Zacharakis. Food styling by Arapostathis & Partners.

==== Ebaines? ====
Ebaines?
- Agency: Rascal; Cream
- Language: Greek
- Running time: 94 seconds
- Product: Burger
- Release date: February 2018
- Slogan: Ebaines?
- Directed by: Vassilis Bourantas
- Music by: Kyriakos Moustakas
- Production company: Topcut+Modiano Athens; TopCut Belgrade
- Produced by: Paco Karababas
- Country: Greece; Serbia
- Preceded by: Epic (2017)

In February 2018, a commercial promoting Goody's Burger House was released, with the slogan being "Ebaines?", a slang term nowadays used as a sexual innuendo. Despite the use of the said term, it was noted for its use of themes regarding LGBT, sexual obsession, bullying, parking violation (a trio of women holding baseball bats, approach a car illegally parked in a disabled parking permit; the original cut shows them ready to break it apart), human sexuality and gender stereotypes. As said by the clients responsible for the commercial, its intention was to give a different meaning to that term and motivate people to discuss about these social issues by addressing them, while also advertising Goody's as welcome, friendly place to consume. It received polarizing reactions from audiences. The use of most of the said themes was widely criticized, with the commercial described as "cringeworthy", "sexist" and a poor imitation of the similarly controversial Jumbo ones, as well as the intention of promoting a restaurant directly unrelated to them. However, others praised the commercial for that, and were favorable on the commercial's artistic sector. The music track Epic, composed, arranged and produced by Rabbeats Music, was also praised. The commercial itself became popular − five days after its release on YouTube, (where it has currently a like/dislike ratio of 500/2.000) it had over 200.000 views, and it surpassed 600.000 views one month later.

Having finished production as of December 2017, it won an Ermis Silver award for Original Music without Vocals, and was also nominated for an Ermis award for Food Commercial Production. The cinematography was made by Thimios Bakatakis and copywriting was provided by Danai Katsali and Elli Veinoglou.

The commercial spawned others. One released in June 2018, promoted subscription to The All-Star Club through the restaurant's website, and is entirely cel animated. In this, the viewer is asked if he would dare to enter several creepy doors and gates, before leading him to his final destination: the Goody's Burger House site. An edited version of the original, "Evgaines?", was released on YouTube on February 12, 2018. Another commercial promoting Hellmann's BBQ Pulled Burgers was also released on YouTube on October 21, 2018.

== See also ==
- List of hamburger restaurants
- Flocafé
