= Dimitris Daskalopoulos =

Greek businessman and art collector

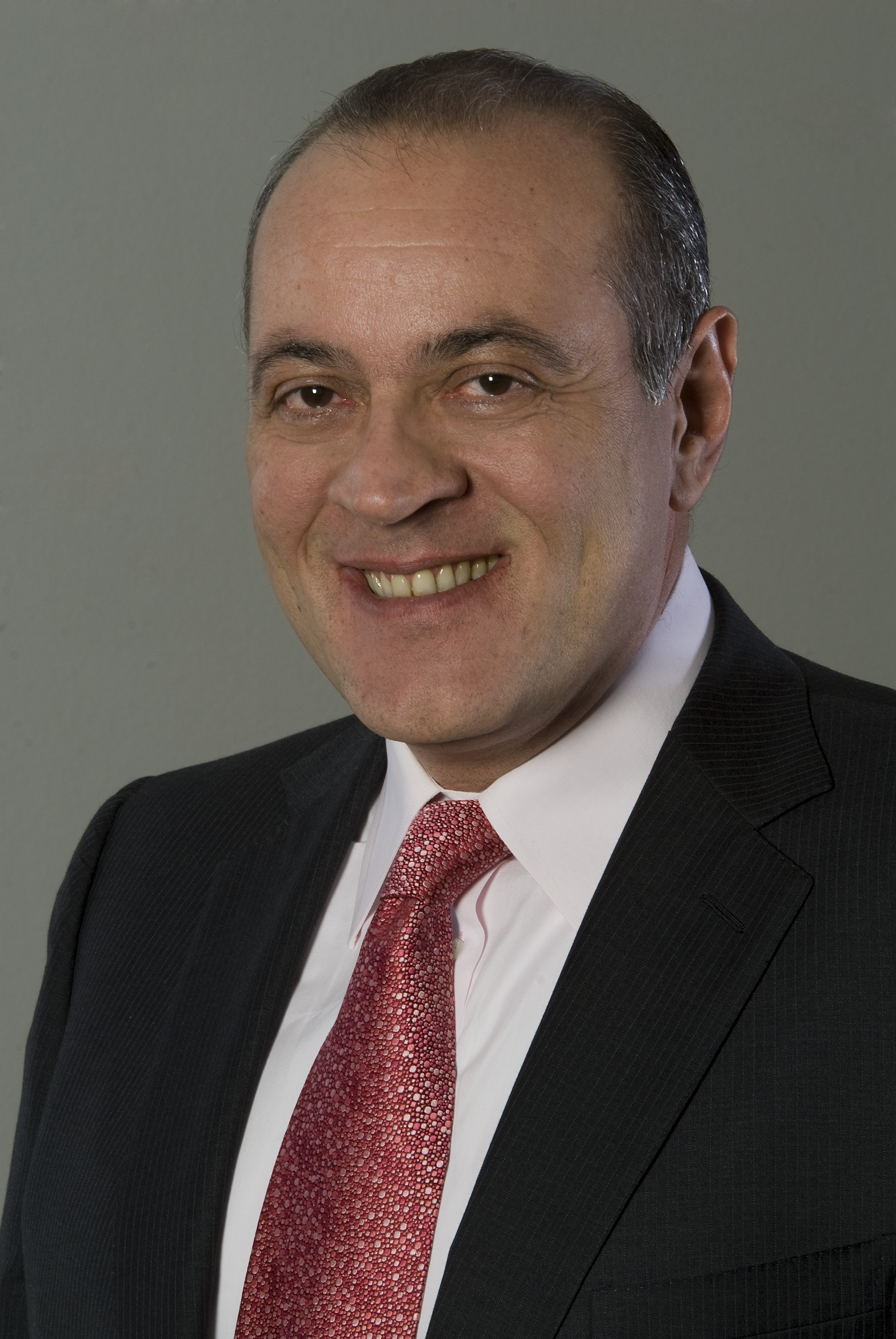
Dimitris Daskalopoulos

Dimitris Daskalopoulos, OBE (Greek: Δημήτρης Δασκαλόπουλος; born 1957, Athens) is a Greek entrepreneur who is known as founder and chairman of DAMMA Holdings SA, a financial services and investment company. He served as the Chairman of the Board of the Hellenic Federation of Enterprises (SEV) for 8 consecutive years (2006-2014). He is SEV’s Honorary President.

== Career ==
From 1983 to 2007, Daskalopoulos was the principal owner, Chairman and CEO of Delta Holdings/Vivartia SA, Greece’s largest food conglomerate. In 2007, Greece’s Marfin Investment Group bought 30 percent of Vivartia for 550 million euros ($758 million) from Daskalopoulos and Spyridon Theodoropoulos, its founding shareholders.

In addition to his business activities, Daskalopoulos served as Vice President of the Confederation of European Business from 2013 to 2015, under the leadership of its president Emma Marcegaglia. In 2016, founded diaNEOsis, a research think tank in Greece, which commissions studies and makes policy proposals on the major social and economic issues in Greece; he has been serving as the organization's chairman since its foundation.

== Art collection ==
Since 1994, Daskalopoulos has been a collector of contemporary art and put together the D.Daskalopoulos Collection. His first contemporary purchase was The Painting in the Inner Egg (1993) by Rebecca Horn. On 17 November 1999, he notably purchased a limited-edition replica of Marcel Duchamp's Fountain (owned by Arturo Schwarz) was sold at Sotheby's, New York, for $1.8 million; Daskalopoulos declared that Fountain represented the origin of contemporary art. The price set a world record, at the time, for a work by Duchamp at public auction. The collection now comprises over 500 works by 170 artists, including Matthew Barney, Louise Bourgeois, Damien Hirst, Mike Kelley, Paul McCarthy, and Kiki Smith.

In 2003, Daskalopoulos made a joint acquisition with the Solomon R. Guggenheim Museum of Barney’s sculpture Chrysler Imperial (2002); it now belongs fully to the museum.

Daskalopoulos is also a Vice President of the Board of Trustees of the Solomon R. Guggenheim Foundation; Chairman of the Collections Council of the Solomon R. Guggenheim Foundation, and an active member of the Board of Trustees of the Museum of Contemporary Art Chicago (since 2016), the Tate's International Council and the Leadership Council of the New Museum, the International Board of the Palais de Tokyo and a founding partner of the Whitechapel Gallery’s Future Fund (2011).

Thematic exhibitions based on the collection have been presented at the Whitechapel Gallery, London (2010-2011), the Guggenheim Museum, Bilbao (2011) and the Scottish National Gallery of Modern Art, Edinburgh (2012-2013). In 2010, the Guggenheim Museum Bilbao came under fire for announcing its plans for a show consisting of 60 works from the D.Daskalopoulos Collection, with critics claiming that a board member had too much curatorial control over programming, allowing his works to increase in value do to a high-profile exhibition. The museum countered by insisting that no works shown in the show, “The Luminous Interval,” could be sold for three years.

In April 2022, Daskalopoulos announced a gift of some 350 artworks by 142 artists; in addition to giving 140 pieces to Athens’s National Museum of Contemporary Art (EMST) and 110 to Tate, around 100 works are to be shared by the Guggenheim Museum in New York and the Museum of Contemporary Art, Chicago.

== NEON ==
In 2013, Daskalopoulos founded NEON, a non-profit organization which works to bring contemporary culture in Greece closer to everyone. In 2016, NEON helped renovate the Athens Conservatoire and in 2021, NEON and Dimitris Daskalopoulos funded the renovation of the former Public Tobacco Factory - Hellenic Parliament Library and Printing House which is gifted back to the state as a Cultural Center. In 2019 the organization staged an exhibition of work by Antony Gormley at the ancient site of Delos.

== diaNEOsis ==
Founded in 2016, diaNEOsis is an independent research and policy institute that produces research on current and important issues and Its studies arrive at concrete policy proposals. It conducts in-depth investigative journalism reports and produces open data research and related projects. Its activities are financed exclusively from private funds and Its operating costs for the first three years are covered in their entirety by Dimitris Daskalopoulos.

== Recognition ==
Daskalopoulos was appointed Honorary Officer of the Order of the British Empire (OBE) in 2023 UK Honours List in recognition of his services to the arts and philanthropy. He has a gallery named after him; the D.Daskalopoulos Gallery at the Whitechapel Gallery (2022), and has received an honorary doctorate from the Goldsmiths, University of London (2023).

== Other activities ==
- European Roundtable of Industrialists (ERT), Member (1998–2008)

== Recognition ==
- 2014 – Leo Award, awarded by Independent Curators International (ICI)
- 2018 – Honoree at the 2018 Guggenheim International Gala, hosted by the Solomon R. Guggenheim Foundation
