= List of the busiest airports in the European Union =

This is a list of the busiest airports in the European Union (EU), based on various ranking criteria: number of passengers in any given year (2016 to 2021), number of passengers by route type, and highest number of passengers for each largest national airport within the EU.

== Busiest airports by number of passengers ==
=== 2021 ===
The table below reproduces the 50 airports in the European Union with most passengers traveling through them, either arriving, departing, or in transit, and is based on official Eurostat data for the year 2021. Numbers provided by airports to Eurostat might slightly differ from numbers publicized by airports.

Rank 2021	Country	Airport	City served	Passengers		Change 2021–2020	
Rank 2021	Country	Airport	City served	2021	2020	%	Numbers
1	France	Charles de Gaulle Airport	Paris	26,187,008	22,242,299	▲17.7%	▲3,944,709
2	Netherlands	Amsterdam Airport Schiphol	Amsterdam	25,490,810	20,884,510	▲22.1%	▲4,606,300
3	Germany	Frankfurt am Main Airport	Frankfurt	24,765,459	18,738,019	▲32.2%	▲6,027,440
4	Spain	Adolfo Suárez Madrid–Barajas Airport	Madrid	23,193,459	16,494,572	▲40.6%	▲6,698,887
5	Spain	Josep Tarradellas Barcelona–El Prat Airport	Barcelona	18,475,486	12,440,832	▲48.5%	▲6,034,654
6	France	Orly Airport	Paris	15,719,099	10,782,724	▲45.8%	▲4,936,375
7	Spain	Palma de Mallorca Airport	Palma de Mallorca	14,474,127	6,098,064	▲137.4%	▲8,376,063
8	Greece	Athens International Airport	Athens	13,356,385	8,771,886	▲52.3%	▲4,584,499
9	Germany	Munich Airport	Munich	12,473,832	11,092,820	▲12.4%	▲1,381,012
10	Portugal	Lisbon Airport	Lisbon	12,154,747	9,266,962	▲31.2%	▲2,887,785
11	Italy	Leonardo da Vinci–Fiumicino Airport	Rome	11,586,417	9,773,291	▲18.6%	▲1,813,126
12	Austria	Vienna International Airport	Vienna	10,466,116	7,848,003	▲33.4%	▲2,618,113
13	Germany	Berlin Brandenburg Airport	Berlin	9,929,343	3,218,931	▲208.5%	▲6,710,412
14	Italy	Malpensa Airport	Milan	9,577,849	7,205,500	▲32.9%	▲2,372,349
15	Belgium	Brussels Airport	Brussels	9,331,402	6,714,696	▲39.0%	▲2,616,706
16	Denmark	Copenhagen Airport	Copenhagen	9,147,762	7,490,810	▲22.1%	▲1,656,952
17	Spain	Málaga Airport	Málaga	8,746,911	5,073,677	▲72.4%	▲3,673,234
18	Ireland	Dublin Airport	Dublin	8,261,774	7,262,330	▲13.8%	▲999,444
19	Germany	Düsseldorf Airport	Düsseldorf	7,938,800	6,561,798	▲21.0%	▲1,377,002
20	Sweden	Stockholm Arlanda Airport	Stockholm	7,492,905	6,533,101	▲14.7%	▲959,804
21	Poland	Warsaw Chopin Airport	Warsaw	7,440,055	5,471,894	▲36.0%	▲1,968,161
22	Romania	Henri Coandă International Airport	Bucharest	6,887,617	4,450,631	▲54.8%	▲2,436,986
23	Spain	Gran Canaria Airport	Gran Canaria	6,788,948	5,075,635	▲33.8%	▲1,713,313
24	France	Nice Côte d'Azur Airport	Nice	6,528,938	4,574,378	▲42.7%	▲1,954,560
25	Italy	Orio al Serio International Airport	Milan/Bergamo	6,465,073	3,831,564	▲68.7%	▲2,633,509
26	Italy	Catania-Fontanarossa Airport	Catania	6,113,957	3,648,322	▲67.6%	▲2,465,635
27	Spain	Alicante Airport	Alicante	5,813,330	3,723,264	▲56.1%	▲2,090,066
28	Portugal	Porto Airport	Porto	5,787,247	4,449,098	▲30.1%	▲1,338,149
29	Germany	Hamburg Airport	Hamburg	5,313,724	4,555,728	▲16.6%	▲757,996
30	Greece	Heraklion International Airport	Heraklion	4,975,166	2,368,168	▲110.1%	▲2,606,998
31	Spain	Ibiza Airport	Ibiza	4,826,513	2,103,201	▲129.5%	▲2,723,312
32	France	Marseille Provence Airport	Marseille	4,636,248	3,336,977	▲38.9%	▲1,299,271
33	Italy	Naples Airport	Naples	4,615,821	2,771,310	▲66.6%	▲1,844,511
34	Italy	Falcone–Borsellino Airport	Palermo	4,597,048	2,711,868	▲69.5%	▲1,885,180
35	Hungary	Budapest Ferenc Liszt International Airport	Budapest	4,590,249	3,839,945	▲19.5%	▲7 50,304
36	France	Lyon–Saint-Exupéry Airport	Lyon	4,504,305	3,539,768	▲27.2%	▲964,537
37	Spain	Tenerife South Airport	Tenerife	4,501,188	3,347,220	▲34.5%	▲1,153,968
38	Czech Republic	Václav Havel Airport Prague	Prague	4,369,824	3,654,229	▲19.6%	▲715,595
39	Italy	Linate Airport	Milan	4,336,933	2,267,111	▲91.3%	▲2,069,822
40	Finland	Helsinki Airport	Helsinki	4,295,255	5,083,314	▼15.5%	▼788,059
41	Germany	Cologne Bonn Airport	Cologne/Bonn	4,247,180	3,075,977	▲38.1%	▲1,171,203
42	Italy	Bologna Guglielmo Marconi Airport	Bologna	4,133,201	2,521,460	▲63.9%	▲1,611,741
43	Spain	Valencia Airport	Valencia	3,999,659	2,434,619	▲64.3%	▲1,565,040
44	Spain	Tenerife North–Ciudad de La Laguna Airport	Tenerife	3,859,012	2,802,383	▲37.7%	▲1,056,629
45	France	Toulouse–Blagnac Airport	Toulouse	3,816,566	3,128,618	▲22.0%	▲6 87,948
46	Belgium	Brussels South Charleroi Airport	Brussels	3,747,473	2,531,211	▲48.1%	▲1,216,262
47	Germany	Stuttgart Airport	Stuttgart	3,567,347	3,198,299	▲11.5%	▲369,048
48	Greece	Thessaloniki Airport	Thessaloniki	3,466,380	2,325,752	▲49.0%	▲1,140,628
49	Spain	Seville Airport	Seville	3,438,552	2,310,470	▲48.8%	▲1,128,082
50	Italy	Venice Marco Polo Airport	Venice	3,430,095	2,795,285	▲22.7%	▲634,810

=== 2020 ===
Rank 2020	Country	Airport	City served	Passengers		Change 2019–2020	
Rank 2020	Country	Airport	City served	2020	2019	%	Numbers
1	France	Charles de Gaulle Airport	Paris	22,257,469	76,150,007	70.8%	53,892,538
2	United Kingdom	Heathrow Airport	London	22,111,469	80,886,589	72.7%	58,775,120
3	Netherlands	Amsterdam Airport Schiphol	Amsterdam	20,887,174	71,707,144	70.9%	50,819,970
4	Germany	Frankfurt am Main Airport	Frankfurt	18,768,601	70,560,987	73.4%	51,792,386
5	Spain	Adolfo Suárez Madrid–Barajas Airport	Madrid	17,112,389	61,734,944	72.3%	44,622,555
6	Spain	Josep Tarradellas Barcelona–El Prat Airport	Barcelona	12,739,259	52,688,455	75.8%	39,949,196
7	Germany	Munich Airport	Munich	11,120,224	47,959,885	76.81%	36,839,661
8	France	Orly Airport	Paris	10,797,105	31,853,049	66.1%	21,055,944
9	Italy	Leonardo da Vinci–Fiumicino Airport	Rome	9,830,957	43,532,573	77.4%	33,701,616
10	Portugal	Lisbon Airport	Lisbon	9,268,000	31,172,774	70.3%	21,904,774
11	Greece	Athens International Airport	Athens	8,078,383	25,573,993	68.4%	17,495,610
12	Austria	Vienna International Airport	Vienna	7,812,938	31,662,189	75.3%	23,849,251
13	Denmark	Copenhagen Airport	Copenhagen	7,525,441	30,256,703	75.12%	22,731,262
14	Ireland	Dublin Airport	Dublin	7,400,000	32,676,251	77.4%	25,276,251
15	Italy	Malpensa Airport	Milan	7,241,766	28,846,299	74.9%	21,604,533
16	Belgium	Brussels Airport	Brussels	6,743,395	26,360,003	74.42%	19,616,608
17	Germany	Düsseldorf Airport	Düsseldorf	6,569,728	24,283,967	74.2%	17,714,239
18	Sweden	Stockholm Arlanda Airport	Stockholm	6,535,776	25,642,623	74.5%	19,106,847
19	Spain	Palma de Mallorca Airport	Palma de Mallorca	6,108,486	29,721,142	79.4%	23,612,656
20	Germany	Berlin Tegel Airport	Berlin	5,867,601	24,227,570	75.8%	18,359,969
21	Poland	Warsaw Chopin Airport	Warsaw	5,482,000	18,869,302	70.95%	13,387,302
22	Spain	Málaga Airport	Málaga	5,161,636	19,858,656	74.0%	14,697,020
23	Finland	Helsinki Airport	Helsinki	5,053,134	21,861,082	76.9%	16,807,948
24	France	Nice Côte d'Azur Airport	Nice	4,580,459	14,485,423	68.4%	9,904,964
25	Germany	Hamburg Airport	Hamburg	4,557,372	17,234,229	73.6%	12,676,857
26	Romania	Henri Coandă International Airport	Bucharest	4,456,000	14,707,376	69.7%	10,251,376
27	Portugal	Porto Airport	Porto	4,436,000	13,105,339	66.2%	8,669,339
28	Hungary	Budapest Ferenc Liszt International Airport	Budapest	3,859,379	16,173,399	76.14%	12,314,020
29	Italy	Orio al Serio International Airport	Milan/Bergamo	3,833,063	13,857,257	72.3%	10,024,194
30	Spain	Alicante Airport	Alicante	3,739,499	15,048,240	75.1%	11,308,741
31	Czech Republic	Václav Havel Airport Prague	Prague	3,665,871	17,804,900	79%	14,139,029
32	Italy	Catania-Fontanarossa Airport	Catania	3,654,457	10,223,113	64.3%	6,568,656
33	France	Lyon–Saint-Exupéry Airport	Lyon	3,553,918	11,037,410	69,7%	7,483,492
34	France	Marseille Provence Airport	Marseille	3,359,149	10,151,743	66.9%	6,792,594
35	Germany	Berlin Schönefeld Airport	Berlin	3,223,603	11,417,435	71.7%	8,193,832
36	Germany	Stuttgart Airport	Stuttgart	3,213,695	12,732,670	74.8%	9,518,975
37	France	Toulouse–Blagnac Airport	Toulouse	3,130,847	9,620,224	67.5%	6,489,377
38	Germany	Cologne Bonn Airport	Cologne/Bonn	3,076,587	12,369,000	75.1%	9,292,413
39	Bulgaria	Sofia Airport	Sofia	2,937,846	7,107,096	58.70%	4,169,250
40	Italy	Venice Marco Polo Airport	Venice	2,799,688	11,561,594	75.8%	8,761,906
41	Italy	Naples Airport	Naples	2,779,946	10,860,068	74.4%	8,080,122
42	Italy	Falcone–Borsellino Airport	Palermo	2,701,519	7,018,087	61.5%	6,491,145
43	France; Switzerland	EuroAirport Basel Mulhouse Freiburg	Basel/Mulhouse/Freiburg im Breisgau	2,598,980	9,090,125	71.4%	6,491,145
44	Poland	Kraków John Paul II International Airport	Kraków	2,592,972	8,410,817	69.2%	5,817,904

=== 2019 ===
Rank 2019	Country	Airport	City served	Passengers		Change 2018–2019	
Rank 2019	Country	Airport	City served	2019	2018	%	Numbers
1	United Kingdom	Heathrow Airport	London	80,886,589	80,100,311	1.0%	786,278
2	France	Charles de Gaulle Airport	Paris	76,150,007	72,229,723	5.4%	3,920,284
3	Netherlands	Amsterdam Airport Schiphol	Amsterdam	71,707,144	71,053,157	0.9%	653,987
4	Germany	Frankfurt am Main Airport	Frankfurt	70,556,072	69,510,269	1.5%	1,045,803
5	Spain	Adolfo Suárez Madrid–Barajas Airport	Madrid	61,734,037	57,891,340	6.6%	3,842,697
6	Spain	Josep Tarradellas Barcelona–El Prat Airport	Barcelona	52,686,314	50,172,457	5.0%	2,513,857
7	Germany	Munich Airport	Munich	47,941,348	46,253,620	3.6%	1,687,728
8	United Kingdom	Gatwick Airport	London	46,574,786	46,081,327	1.1%	493,459
9	Italy	Leonardo da Vinci–Fiumicino Airport	Rome	43,532,573	42,995,119	1.3%	537,454
10	Ireland	Dublin Airport	Dublin	32,907,673	31,497,526	4.5%	1,410,147
11	France	Orly Airport	Paris	31,853,049	33,120,685	3.8%	1,267,636
12	Austria	Vienna International Airport	Vienna	31,662,189	27,037,292	17.1%	4,624,897
13	Portugal	Lisbon Airport	Lisbon	31,173,000	29,031,268	7.3%	2,141,732
14	Denmark	Copenhagen Airport	Copenhagen	30,256,703	30,298,531	0.1%	41,828
15	Spain	Palma de Mallorca Airport	Palma de Mallorca	29,721,123	29,081,787	2.2%	639,336
16	United Kingdom	Manchester Airport	Manchester	29,367,477	28,254,970	3.9%	1,112,507
17	Italy	Malpensa Airport	Milan	28,846,299	24,725,490	16.7%	4,120,809
18	United Kingdom	London Stansted Airport	London	28,124,292	27,995,121	0.5%	129,171
19	Belgium	Brussels Airport	Brussels	26,360,003	25,675,939	2.7%	684,064
20	Sweden	Stockholm Arlanda Airport	Stockholm	25,642,703	26,845,419	4.5%	1,202,716
21	Greece	Athens International Airport	Athens	25,574,030	24,135,736	6.0%	1,438,294
22	Germany	Düsseldorf Airport	Düsseldorf	25,507,566	24,283,967	5.0%	1,223,599
23	Germany	Berlin Tegel Airport	Berlin	24,227,570	22,000,430	10.1%	2,227,140
24	Finland	Helsinki Airport	Helsinki	21,861,082	20,848,838	4.9%	1,012,244
25	Spain	Málaga Airport	Málaga	19,856,299	19,021,704	4.4%	834,595
26	Poland	Warsaw Chopin Airport	Warsaw	18,869,302	17,755,543	6.3%	1,113,760
27	United Kingdom	Luton Airport	London	18,213,901	16,766,552	8.6%	1,447,349
28	Czech Republic	Václav Havel Airport Prague	Prague	17,804,900	16,797,006	6.0%	1,007,894
29	Germany	Hamburg Airport	Hamburg	17,308,773	17,234,229	0.4%	74,544
30	Hungary	Budapest Ferenc Liszt International Airport	Budapest	16,173,399	14,867,491	8.8%	1,305,908
31	Spain	Alicante Airport	Alicante	15,047,840	13,981,320	7.6%	1,066,520
32	United Kingdom	Edinburgh Airport	Edinburgh	14,733,966	14,291,811	3.1%	442,155
33	Romania	Henri Coandă International Airport	Bucharest	14,707,376	13,820,428	6.4%	886,948
34	France	Nice Côte d'Azur Airport	Nice	14,485,423	13,850,561	4.6%	634,862
35	Italy	Orio al Serio International Airport	Milan/Bergamo	13,857,257	12,938,572	7.1%	918,685
36	Portugal	Porto Airport	Porto	13,107,000	11,939,562	9.7%	1,167,438
37	Germany	Stuttgart Airport	Stuttgart	12,721,441	11,798,090	9.8%	923,351
38	United Kingdom	Birmingham Airport	Birmingham	12,646,456	12,454,642	1.5%	191,814
39	Germany	Cologne Bonn Airport	Cologne/Bonn	12,368,519	12,957,828	4.5%	589,309
40	France	Lyon–Saint-Exupéry Airport	Lyon	11,739,600	11,037,410	6.4%	702,190
41	Italy	Venice Marco Polo Airport	Venice	11,561,594	11,184,608	3.4%	376,986
42	Germany	Berlin Schönefeld Airport	Berlin	11,417,435	12,725,937	10.3%	1,308,502
43	Italy	Naples Airport	Naples	10,860,068	9,932,029	9.3%	928,039
44	Italy	Catania-Fontanarossa Airport	Catania	10,223,113	9,933,318	2.9%	289,795
45	France	Marseille Provence Airport	Marseille	10,151,743	9,390,371	8.1%	761,372
46	France	Toulouse–Blagnac Airport	Toulouse	9,620,224	9,630,308	0.1%	10,084
47	Italy	Bologna Guglielmo Marconi Airport	Bologna	9,405,920	8,506,658	10.6%	899,262
48	France; Switzerland	EuroAirport Basel Mulhouse Freiburg	Basel/Mulhouse/Freiburg im Breisgau	9,094,821	8,573,705	6.0%	521,116
49	Portugal	Faro Airport	Faro	9,009,000	8,685,571	3.7%	323,429
50	United Kingdom	Bristol Airport	Bristol	8,959,679	8,696,653	3.0%	263,026

=== 2018 ===
Rank 2018	Country	Airport	City served	Passengers 2018	Passengers 2017	Change % 2017–2018	Passengers change 2017–2018
1.	United Kingdom	Heathrow Airport	London	80,124,537	78,012,825	2.7%	2,111,712
2.	France	Charles de Gaulle Airport	Paris	72,229,723	69,471,442	4.0%	2,758,281
3.	Netherlands	Amsterdam Airport Schiphol	Amsterdam	71,053,157	68,515,425	3.7%	2,537,732
4.	Germany	Frankfurt am Main Airport	Frankfurt	69,510,269	64,500,386	7.8%	5,009,883
5.	Spain	Adolfo Suárez Madrid–Barajas Airport	Madrid	57,891,340	53,402,506	8.4%	4,488,834
6.	Spain	Barcelona–El Prat Josep Tarradellas Airport	Barcelona	50,172,457	47,284,500	6.1%	2,887,957
7.	Germany	Munich Airport	Munich	46,253,623	44,577,241	3.8%	1,676,382
8.	United Kingdom	Gatwick Airport	London	46,086,089	45,556,899	1.2%	529,190
9.	Italy	Leonardo da Vinci–Fiumicino Airport	Rome	42,995,119	40,971,881	4.9%	2,023,238
10.	France	Orly Airport	Paris	33,120,685	32,042,475	3.4%	1,078,210
11.	Ireland	Dublin Airport	Dublin	31,497,526	29,582,321	6.5%	1,915,205
12.	Denmark	Copenhagen Airport	Copenhagen	30,298,531	29,177,833	3.8%	1,120,698
13.	Spain	Palma de Mallorca Airport	Palma de Mallorca	29,081,787	27,970,655	4.0%	1,111,132
14.	Portugal	Lisbon Airport	Lisbon	29,031,268	26,646,079	9.0%	2,385,189
15.	United Kingdom	Manchester Airport	Manchester	28,292,797	27,826,054	1.7%	466,743
16.	United Kingdom	London Stansted Airport	London	27,996,116	25,904,450	8.1%	2,091,666
17.	Austria	Vienna International Airport	Vienna	27,037,292	24,392,805	10.8%	2,644,487
18.	Sweden	Stockholm Arlanda Airport	Stockholm	26,845,419	26,623,606	0.8%	221,813
19.	Belgium	Brussels Airport	Brussels	25,675,939	24,783,911	3.6%	892,028
20.	Italy	Malpensa Airport	Milan	24,725,490	22,169,167	11.5%	2,556,323
21.	Germany	Düsseldorf Airport	Düsseldorf	24,283,967	24,640,564	1.4%	356,597
22.	Greece	Athens International Airport	Athens	24,135,736	21,737,787	11.0%	2,397,949
23.	Germany	Berlin Tegel Airport	Berlin	22,000,430	20,460,688	7.5%	1,539,742
24.	Finland	Helsinki Airport	Helsinki	20,848,838	18,892,386	10.4%	1,956,452
25.	Spain	Málaga Airport	Málaga	19,021,704	18,628,876	2.1%	392,828
26.	Poland	Warsaw Chopin Airport	Warsaw	17,755,542	15,730,330	12.9%	2,025,212
27.	Germany	Hamburg Airport	Hamburg	17,234,229	17,622,997	2.2%	388,768
28.	Czech Republic	Václav Havel Airport Prague	Prague	16,797,006	15,415,001	9.0%	1,382,005
29.	United Kingdom	Luton Airport	London	16,769,634	15,990,276	4.9%	779,358
30.	Hungary	Budapest Ferenc Liszt International Airport	Budapest	14,867,491	13,097,239	13.5%	1,770,252
31.	United Kingdom	Edinburgh Airport	Edinburgh	14,294,305	13,410,343	6.6%	883,962
32.	Spain	Alicante Airport	Alicante	13,981,320	13,713,061	2.0%	268,259
33.	France	Nice Côte d'Azur Airport	Nice	13,850,561	13,304,782	4.1%	545,779
34.	Romania	Henri Coandă International Airport	Bucharest	13,820,428	12,804,191	7.9%	1,016,237
35.	Germany	Cologne Bonn Airport	Cologne/Bonn	12,957,828	12,384,223	4.6%	573,605
36.	Italy	Orio al Serio International Airport	Milan/Bergamo	12,938,572	12,336,137	4.9%	602,435
37.	Germany	Berlin Schönefeld Airport	Berlin	12,725,937	12,865,312	1.1%	139,375
38.	United Kingdom	Birmingham Airport	Birmingham	12,457,051	12,990,303	4.1%	533,252
39.	Portugal	Porto Airport	Porto	11,939,562	10,787,630	10.7%	1,151,932
40.	Germany	Stuttgart Airport	Stuttgart	11,798,090	10,962,247	7.6%	835,843
41.	Italy	Venice Marco Polo Airport	Venice	11,184,608	10,371,380	7.8%	813,228
42.	France	Lyon–Saint-Exupéry Airport	Lyon	11,037,410	10,280,192	7.4%	757,218
43.	Italy	Catania-Fontanarossa Airport	Catania	9,933,318	9,120,913	8.9%	812,405
44.	Italy	Naples Airport	Naples	9,932,029	8,577,507	15.8%	1,354,522
45.	United Kingdom	Glasgow Airport	Glasgow	9,656,227	9,897,959	2.4%	241,732
46.	France	Toulouse–Blagnac Airport	Toulouse	9,630,308	9,264,613	3.9%	365,695
47.	France	Marseille Provence Airport	Marseille	9,390,371	9,002,086	4.3%	388,285
48.	Italy	Linate Airport	Milan	9,233,475	9,548,363	3.3%	314,888
49.	United Kingdom	Bristol Airport	Bristol	8,699,529	8,239,250	5.6%	460,279
50.	Portugal	Faro Airport	Faro	8,685,571	8,727,132	0.5%	41,561

=== 2017 ===
Rank 2017	Country	Airport	City served	Passengers 2017	Passengers 2016	Change % 2016–2017	Passengers change 2016–2017
1.	United Kingdom	Heathrow Airport	London	78,012,825	75,711,130	3.0%	2,301,695
2.	France	Charles de Gaulle Airport	Paris	69,471,442	65,933,145	5.4%	3,538,297
3.	Netherlands	Amsterdam Airport Schiphol	Amsterdam	68,515,425	63,625,664	7.7%	4,889,761
4.	Germany	Frankfurt am Main Airport	Frankfurt	64,500,386	60,786,937	6.1%	3,713,449
5.	Spain	Adolfo Suárez Madrid–Barajas Airport	Madrid	53,402,506	50,420,583	5.9%	2,981,923
6.	Spain	Barcelona–El Prat Josep Tarradellas Airport	Barcelona	47,284,500	44,154,693	7.1%	3,129,807
7.	United Kingdom	Gatwick Airport	London	45,556,899	43,119,628	5.7%	2,437,271
8.	Germany	Munich Airport	Munich	44,577,241	42,261,309	5.5%	2,315,932
9.	Italy	Leonardo da Vinci–Fiumicino Airport	Rome	40,971,881	41,744,769	1.9%	772,888
10.	France	Orly Airport	Paris	32,042,475	31,237,865	2.6%	804,610
11.	Ireland	Dublin Airport	Dublin	29,582,321	27,907,384	6.0%	1,674,937
12.	Denmark	Copenhagen Airport	Copenhagen	29,177,833	29,043,287	0.5%	134,546
13.	Spain	Palma de Mallorca Airport	Palma de Mallorca	27,970,655	26,253,882	6.5%	1,716,773
14.	United Kingdom	Manchester Airport	Manchester	27,773,303	25,637,054	8.3%	2,136,249
15.	Portugal	Lisbon Airport	Lisbon	26,646,079	22,449,289	18.7%	4,196,790
16.	Sweden	Stockholm Arlanda Airport	Stockholm	26,623,606	24,682,466	7.9%	1,941,140
17.	United Kingdom	London Stansted Airport	London	25,904,450	24,320,071	6.5%	1,584,379
18.	Belgium	Brussels Airport	Brussels	24,783,911	21,818,418	13.6%	2,965,493
19.	Germany	Düsseldorf Airport	Düsseldorf	24,640,564	23,521,919	4.8%	1,118,645
20.	Austria	Vienna International Airport	Vienna	24,392,805	23,352,016	4.5%	1,040,789
21.	Italy	Malpensa Airport	Milan	22,169,167	19,420,690	14.2%	2,748,477
22.	Greece	Athens International Airport	Athens	21,737,787	20,017,530	8.6%	1,720,257
23.	Germany	Berlin Tegel Airport	Berlin	20,460,688	21,253,959	3.7%	793,271
24.	Finland	Helsinki Airport	Helsinki	18,892,386	17,184,681	9.9%	1,707,705
25.	Spain	Málaga Airport	Málaga	18,628,876	16,672,776	11.7%	1,956,100
26.	Germany	Hamburg Airport	Hamburg	17,622,997	16,224,154	8.6%	1,398,843
27.	United Kingdom	Luton Airport	London	15,799,219	14,551,774	8.6%	1,247,445
28.	Poland	Warsaw Chopin Airport	Warsaw	15,730,330	12,795,356	22.9%	2,934,974
29.	Czech Republic	Václav Havel Airport Prague	Prague	15,415,001	13,074,517	17.9%	2,340,484
30.	Spain	Alicante Airport	Alicante	13,713,061	12,344,945	11.1%	1,368,116
31.	United Kingdom	Edinburgh Airport	Edinburgh	13,410,658	12,348,425	8.6%	1,062,233
32.	France	Nice Côte d'Azur Airport	Nice	13,304,782	12,427,427	7.1%	877,355
33.	Hungary	Budapest Ferenc Liszt International Airport	Budapest	13,097,239	11,441,999	14.5%	1,655,240
34.	United Kingdom	Birmingham Airport	Birmingham	12,990,303	11,645,334	11.5%	1,344,969
35.	Germany	Berlin Schönefeld Airport	Berlin	12,865,312	11,652,922	10.4%	1,212,390
36.	Romania	Henri Coandă International Airport	Bucharest	12,804,191	10,982,967	16.6%	1,821,224
37.	Germany	Cologne Bonn Airport	Cologne/Bonn	12,384,223	11,910,138	4.0%	474,085
38.	Italy	Orio al Serio International Airport	Milan/Bergamo	12,336,137	11,159,631	10.5%	1,176,506
39.	Germany	Stuttgart Airport	Stuttgart	10,962,247	10,626,430	3.2%	335,817
40.	Portugal	Porto Airport	Porto	10,787,630	9,378,082	15.0%	1,409,548
41.	Italy	Venice Marco Polo Airport	Venice	10,371,380	9,624,748	7.8%	746,632
42.	France	Lyon–Saint-Exupéry Airport	Lyon	10,280,192	9,553,250	7.6%	726,942
43.	United Kingdom	Glasgow Airport	Glasgow	9,897,959	9,346,245	5.9%	551,714
44.	Italy	Linate Airport	Milan	9,548,363	9,682,264	1.4%	133,901
45.	France	Toulouse–Blagnac Airport	Toulouse	9,264,613	8,081,179	14.6%	1,183,436
46.	Italy	Catania-Fontanarossa Airport	Catania	9,120,913	7,914,117	15.2%	1,206,796
47.	France	Marseille Provence Airport	Marseille	9,002,086	8,475,809	6.2%	526,277
48.	Portugal	Faro Airport	Faro	8,727,132	7,630,909	14.4%	1,096,223
49.	Italy	Naples Airport	Naples	8,577,507	6,775,988	26.6%	1,801,519
50.	United Kingdom	Bristol Airport	Bristol	8,239,949	7,610,780	8.3%	629,169

=== 2016 ===
Rank 2016	Country	Airport	City served	Passengers 2015	Passengers 2016	Change 2015–2016
1	United Kingdom	Heathrow Airport	London	74,985,475	75,711,130	▲1.0%
2	France	Charles de Gaulle Airport	Paris	65,766,986	65,933,145	▲0.3%
3	Netherlands	Amsterdam Airport Schiphol	Amsterdam	58,284,848	63,625,664	▲9.2%
4	Germany	Frankfurt Airport	Frankfurt	61,032,022	60,786,937	▼0.4%
5	Spain	Adolfo Suárez Madrid–Barajas Airport	Madrid	46,824,838	50,420,583	▲7.7%
6	Spain	Barcelona–El Prat Josep Tarradellas Airport	Barcelona	39,711,237	44,154,693	▲11.2%
7	United Kingdom	Gatwick Airport	London	40,269,087	43,119,628	▲7.1%
8	Germany	Munich Airport	Munich	40,981,522	42,261,309	▲3.1%
9	Italy	Leonardo da Vinci–Fiumicino Airport	Rome	40,463,208	41,744,769	▲3.2%
10	France	Orly Airport	Paris	29,664,993	31,237,865	▲5.3%
11	Denmark	Copenhagen Airport	Copenhagen	26,610,332	29,043,287	▲9.1%
12	Ireland	Dublin Airport	Dublin	25,049,319	27,907,384	▲11.4%
13	Spain	Palma de Mallorca Airport	Palma de Mallorca	23,745,023	26,253,882	▲10.6%
14	United Kingdom	Manchester Airport	Manchester	23,136,047	25,637,054	▲10.8%
15	Sweden	Stockholm Arlanda Airport	Stockholm	23,142,536	24,682,466	▲6.7%
16	United Kingdom	London Stansted Airport	London	22,519,178	24,320,071	▲8.0%
17	Germany	Düsseldorf Airport	Düsseldorf	22,476,685	23,521,919	▲4.7%
18	Austria	Vienna International Airport	Vienna	22,775,054	23,352,016	▲2.5%
19	Portugal	Lisbon Airport	Lisbon	20,090,418	22,449,289	▲11.7%
20	Belgium	Brussels Airport	Brussels	23,460,018	21,818,418	▼7%
21	Germany	Berlin Tegel Airport	Berlin	21,005,196	21,253,959	▲1.2%
22	Greece	Athens International Airport	Athens	18,087,377	20,017,530	▲10.7%
23	Italy	Malpensa Airport	Milan	18,582,043	19,420,690	▲4.5%
24	Finland	Helsinki Airport	Helsinki	16,422,266	17,184,681	▲4.6%
25	Spain	Málaga Airport	Málaga	14,404,206	16,672,776	▲15.7%
26	Germany	Hamburg Airport	Hamburg	15,610,072	16,224,154	▲3.9%
27	United Kingdom	Luton Airport	London	12,263,505	14,551,774	▲18.5%
28	Czech Republic	Václav Havel Airport Prague	Prague	12,030,928	13,074,517	▲8.7%
29	Poland	Warsaw Chopin Airport	Warsaw	11,186,688	12,795,356	▲14.4%
30	France	Nice Côte d'Azur Airport	Nice	12,016,730	12,427,427	▲3.4%
31	United Kingdom	Edinburgh Airport	Edinburgh	11,114,587	12,348,425	▲11.1%
32	Spain	Alicante Airport	Alicante	10,575,288	12,344,945	▲16.7%
33	Germany	Cologne Bonn Airport	Cologne / Bonn	10,338,375	11,910,138	▲15.2%
34	Germany	Berlin Schönefeld Airport	Berlin	8,526,268	11,652,922	▲36.7%
35	United Kingdom	Birmingham Airport	Birmingham	10,187,122	11,645,334	▲14.3%
36	Hungary	Budapest Ferenc Liszt International Airport	Budapest	10,298,963	11,441,999	▲11.1%
37	Italy	Orio al Serio International Airport	Milan / Bergamo	10,404,625	11,159,631	▲7.3%
38	Romania	Henri Coandă International Airport	Bucharest	9,274,629	10,982,967	▲18.3%
39	Germany	Stuttgart Airport	Stuttgart	10,512,225	10,626,430	▲1.1%
40	Italy	Linate Airport	Milan	9,689,635	9,682,264	▼0.1%
41	Italy	Venice Marco Polo Airport	Venice	8,751,028	9,624,748	▲10.0%
42	France	Lyon–Saint-Exupéry Airport	Lyon	8,703,354	9,553,250	▲9.8%
43	Portugal	Porto Airport	Porto	8,087,740	9,378,082	▲16.0%
44	United Kingdom	Glasgow Airport	Glasgow	8,714,154	9,346,245	▲7.3%
45	France	Marseille Provence Airport	Marseille	8,261,804	8,475,809	▲2.6%
46	France	Toulouse–Blagnac Airport	Toulouse	7,669,054	8,081,179	▲5.4%
47	Italy	Catania-Fontanarossa Airport	Catania	7,105,487	7,914,117	▲11.4%
48	Italy	Bologna Guglielmo Marconi Airport	Bologna	6,889,742	7,680,992	▲11.5%
49	Portugal	Faro Airport	Faro	6,436,881	7,630,909	▲18.5%
50	United Kingdom	Bristol Airport	Bristol	6,786,790	7,610,780	▲12.1%

== Busiest EU airports by route type ==
=== National (Domestic) ===
This list shows Eurostat data for the airports which had the most passengers taking national (domestic) flights in 2021 within EU countries (i.e. passengers traveling from Paris to Marseille).

Rank 2021	Country	Airport	City served	Passengers
1	Spain	Adolfo Suárez Madrid–Barajas Airport	Madrid	8,763,973
2	Spain	Josep Tarradellas Barcelona–El Prat Airport	Barcelona	7,602,151
3	France	Orly Airport	Paris	7,107,371
4	Greece	Athens International Airport	Athens	5,087,716
5	Spain	Palma de Mallorca Airport	Palma de Mallorca	4,762,611
6	Italy	Catania–Fontanarossa Airport	Catania	4,629,847
7	Italy	Leonardo da Vinci–Fiumicino Airport	Rome	4,399,180
8	France	Charles de Gaulle Airport	Paris	4,330,451
9	Spain	Gran Canaria Airport	Gran Canaria	3,967,707
10	Italy	Milan Malpensa Airport	Milan	3,857,898
11	Spain	Tenerife North–Ciudad de La Laguna Airport	Tenerife	3,841,711
12	Italy	Falcone–Borsellino Airport	Palermo	3,649,540
13	France	Nice Côte d'Azur Airport	Nice	3,440,907
14	Italy	Linate Airport	Milan	2,801,539
15	France	Toulouse–Blagnac Airport	Toulouse	2,427,581
16	Spain	Ibiza Airport	Ibiza	2,395,952
17	France	Marseille Provence Airport	Marseille	2,280,886
18	Germany	Munich Airport	Munich	2,276,750
19	Spain	Seville Airport	Seville	2,217,265
20	Italy	Cagliari Elmas Airport	Cagliari	2,150,448
21	Italy	Bari Karol Wojtyła Airport	Bari	2,142,326
22	Italy	Naples Airport	Naples	2,091,453
23	Italy	Orio al Serio International Airport	Milan/Bergamo	2,073,368
25	France	Lyon–Saint-Exupéry Airport	Lyon	2,069,190
25	Germany	Frankfurt Airport	Frankfurt	2,054,818

=== Intra-EU ===
This list shows Eurostat data for the airports which had the most passengers taking international intra-EU flights in 2019 (i.e. passengers traveling from Frankfurt to Barcelona, but not from Madrid to Barcelona).

Rank 2019	Country	Airport	City served	Passengers
1	Netherlands	Amsterdam Airport Schiphol	Amsterdam	9,988,575
2	Germany	Frankfurt Airport	Frankfurt	7,769,160
3	France	Charles de Gaulle Airport	Paris	7,028,871
4	Spain	Adolfo Suárez Madrid–Barajas Airport	Madrid	5,481,576
5	Spain	Josep Tarradellas Barcelona–El Prat Airport	Barcelona	5,057,578
6	Austria	Vienna International Airport	Vienna	4,956,954
7	Portugal	Lisbon Airport	Lisbon	4,916,325
8	Germany	Munich Airport	Munich	4,871,857
9	Belgium	Brussels Airport	Brussels	4,234,902
10	Denmark	Copenhagen Airport	Copenhagen	3,907,932
11	Ireland	Dublin Airport	Dublin	3,716,377
12	Greece	Athens International Airport	Athens	3,588,987
13	Italy	Leonardo da Vinci–Fiumicino Airport	Rome	3,355,086
14	France	Orly Airport	Paris	3,311,822
15	Germany	Düsseldorf Airport	Düsseldorf	3,057,911
16	Sweden	Stockholm Arlanda Airport	Stockholm	3,042,112
17	Portugal	Porto Airport	Porto	2,941,543
18	Italy	Milan Malpensa Airport	Milan	2,718,816
19	Poland	Warsaw Chopin Airport	Warsaw	2,704,651
20	Romania	Henri Coandă International Airport	Romania	2,609,954
21	Spain	Málaga Airport	Málaga	2,482,646
22	Spain	Palma de Mallorca Airport	Palma de Mallorca	2,481,168
23	Finland	Helsinki Airport	Helsinki	2,436,647
24	Hungary	Budapest Ferenc Liszt International Airport	Budapest	2,347,997
25	Germany	Berlin Tegel Airport	Berlin	2,347,030

=== Extra-EU ===
This list shows Eurostat data for the airports which had the most passengers taking international extra-EU flights in 2021 (i.e. passengers traveling from New York to Paris).

Rank 2021	Country	Airport	City served	Passengers
1	France	Charles de Gaulle Airport	Paris	12,844,080
2	Germany	Frankfurt Airport	Frankfurt	11,253,414
3	Netherlands	Amsterdam Airport Schiphol	Amsterdam	11,198,310
4	Spain	Adolfo Suárez Madrid–Barajas Airport	Madrid	6,523,699
5	Portugal	Lisbon Airport	Lisbon	3,770,798
6	Austria	Vienna International Airport	Vienna	3,631,380
7	Germany	Munich Airport	Munich	3,323,377
8	Belgium	Brussels Airport	Brussels	3,281,088
9	Ireland	Dublin Airport	Dublin	3,230,885
10	Poland	Warsaw Chopin Airport	Warsaw	3,182,356
11	Greece	Athens International Airport	Athens	3,130,751
12	Germany	Düsseldorf Airport	Düsseldorf	3,105,431
13	Germany	Berlin Brandenburg Airport	Berlin	2,946,749
14	Spain	Josep Tarradellas Barcelona–El Prat Airport	Barcelona	2,723,946
15	Denmark	Copenhagen Airport	Copenhagen	2,668,569
16	France	Orly Airport	Paris	2,600,057
17	Italy	Leonardo da Vinci–Fiumicino Airport	Rome	2,471,569
18	Italy	Milan Malpensa Airport	Milan	2,361,211
19	Spain	Málaga Airport	Málaga	2,170,043
20	Romania	Henri Coandă International Airport	Romania	2,040,534
21	Spain	Palma de Mallorca Airport	Palma de Mallorca	1,890,660
22	Cyprus	Larnaca International Airport	Porto	1,872,058
23	Spain	Alicante–Elche Miguel Hernández Airport	Alicante	1,821,707
24	Germany	Cologne Bonn Airport	Cologne	1,671,546
25	Sweden	Stockholm Arlanda Airport	Stockholm	1,635,587

== Busiest airport in each EU member state ==
Country	Airport	City served	Passengers		Change 2019–2020	
Country	Airport	City served	2020	2019	%	Numbers
Austria	Vienna International Airport	Vienna	7,812,938	31,662,189	75.3%	23,849,251
Belgium	Brussels Airport	Brussels	6,743,395	26,360,003	74.42%	19,616,608
Bulgaria	Sofia Airport	Sofia	2,937,846	7,107,096	58.70%	4,169,250
Croatia	Zagreb Airport	Zagreb	924,823	3,435,531	73.08%	2,510,708
Cyprus	Larnaca International Airport	Larnaca	1,679,816	8,229,346	79.60%	6,549,530
Czech Republic	Václav Havel Airport Prague	Prague	3,665,871	17,804,900	79%	14,139,029
Denmark	Copenhagen Airport	Copenhagen	7,525,441	30,256,703	75.12%	22,731,262
Estonia	Lennart Meri Tallinn Airport	Tallinn	863,588	3,267,909	73.6%	2,404,321
Finland	Helsinki Airport	Helsinki	5,053,134	21,861,082	76.9%	16,807,948
France	Charles de Gaulle Airport	Paris	22,257,469	76,150,007	70.8%	53,892,538
Germany	Frankfurt am Main Airport	Frankfurt	18,768,601	70,560,987	73.4%	51,792,386
Greece	Athens International Airport	Athens	8,078,383	25,573,993	68.4%	17,495,610
Hungary	Budapest Ferenc Liszt International Airport	Budapest	3,859,379	16,173,399	76.14%	12,314,020
Ireland	Dublin Airport	Dublin	7,400,000	32,676,251	77.4%	25,276,251
Italy	Leonardo da Vinci–Fiumicino Airport	Rome	9,830,957	43,532,573	77.4%	33,701,616
Latvia	Riga International Airport	Riga	2,010,000	7,798,382	74.2%	5,788,382
Lithuania	Vilnius International Airport	Vilnius	1,312,468	5,004,921	73.8%	3,692,453
Luxembourg	Luxembourg Airport	Luxembourg City	1,446,354	4,416,038	75.3%	2 969 684
Malta	Malta International Airport	Malta	1,748,050	7,310,289	76.1%	5,562,239
Netherlands	Amsterdam Airport Schiphol	Amsterdam	20,887,174	71,707,144	70.9%	50,819,970
Poland	Warsaw Chopin Airport	Warsaw	5,482,000	18,869,302	70.95%	13,387,302
Portugal	Lisbon Airport	Lisbon	9,268,000	31,172,774	70.3%	21,904,774
Romania	Henri Coandă International Airport	Bucharest	4,456,000	14,707,376	69.7%	10,251,376
Slovakia	Bratislava Airport	Bratislava	405,097	2,290,242	82.3%	1,885,145
Slovenia	Ljubljana Joze Pucnik Airport	Ljubljana	288,235	1,721,355	83.3%	1,433,120
Spain	Adolfo Suárez Madrid–Barajas Airport	Madrid	17,112,389	61,734,944	72.3%	44,622,555
Sweden	Stockholm Arlanda Airport	Stockholm	6,535,776	25,642,623	74.5%	19,106,847

== Gallery ==
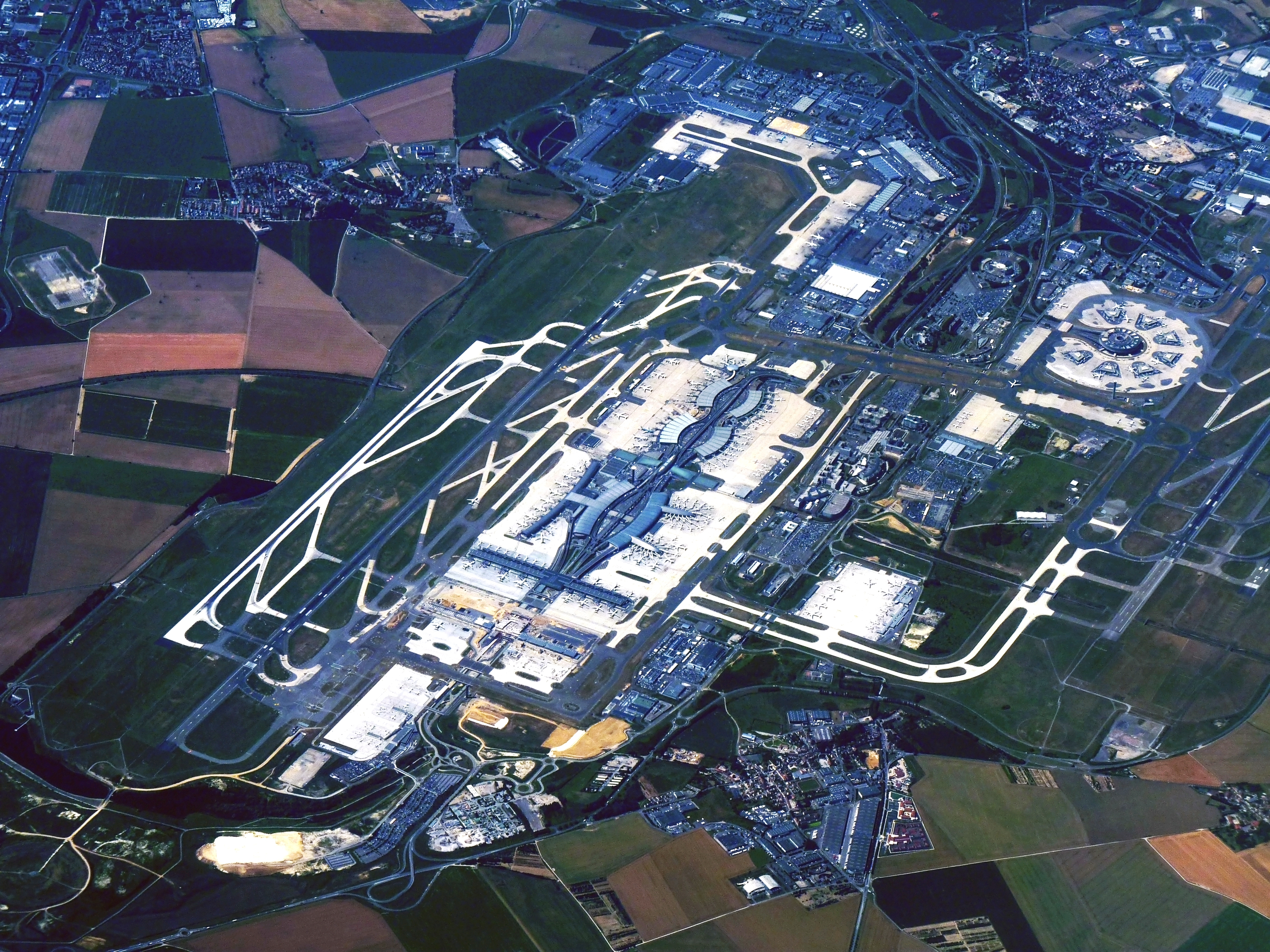
Paris-Charles de Gaulle Airport serving Paris, France

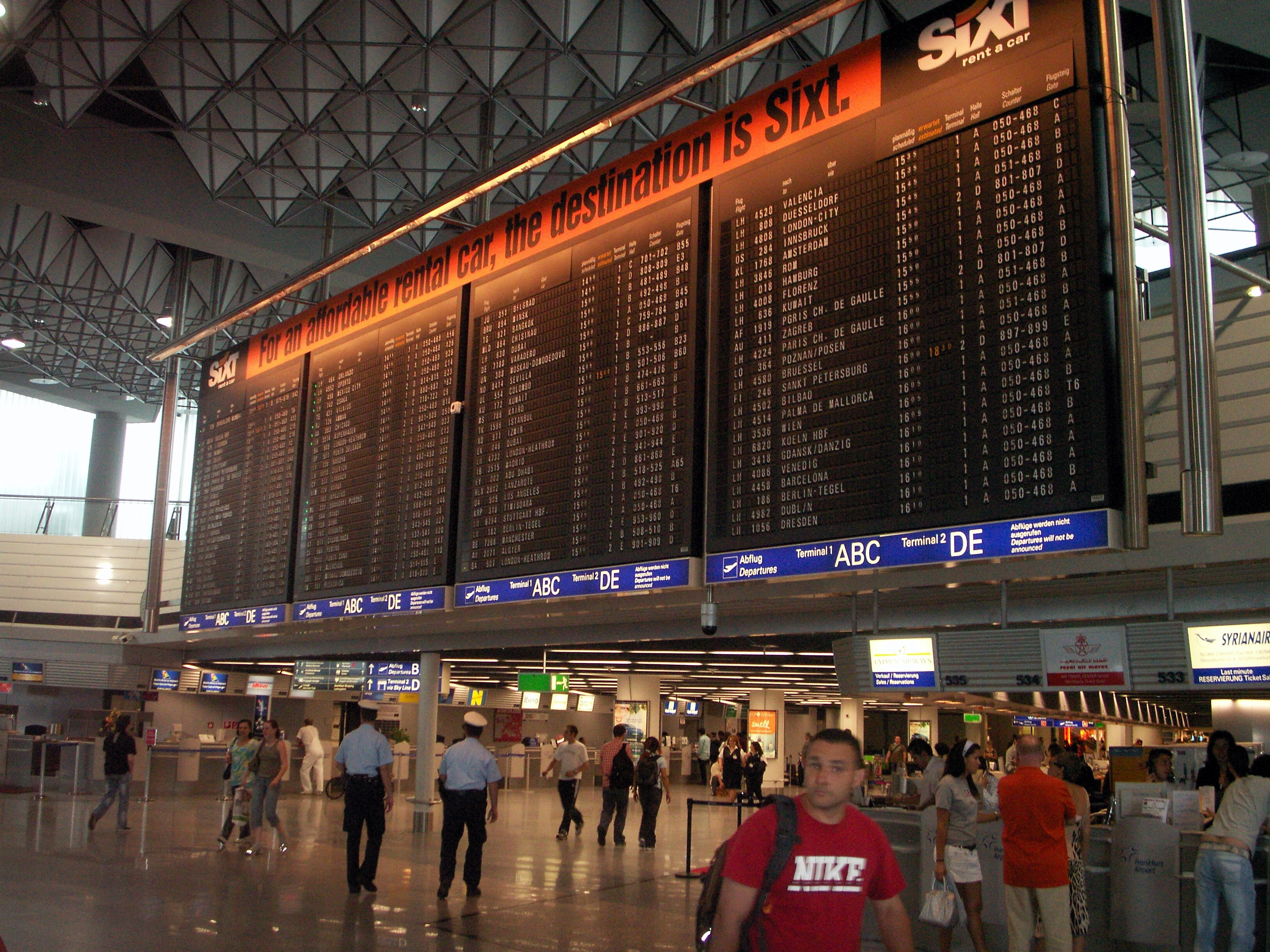
Frankfurt Airport serving Frankfurt, Germany

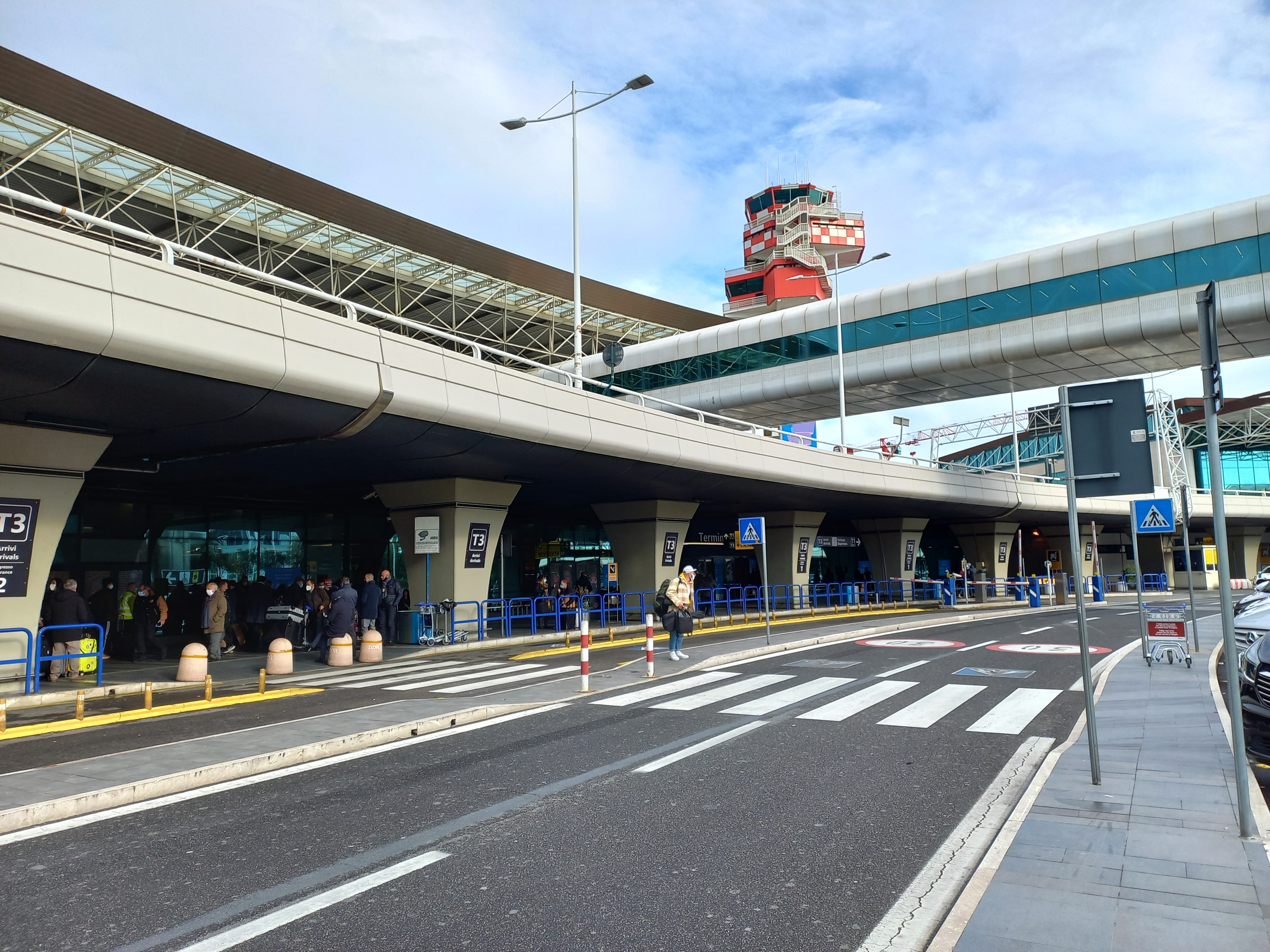
Leonardo da Vinci-Fiumicino Airport serving Rome, Italy

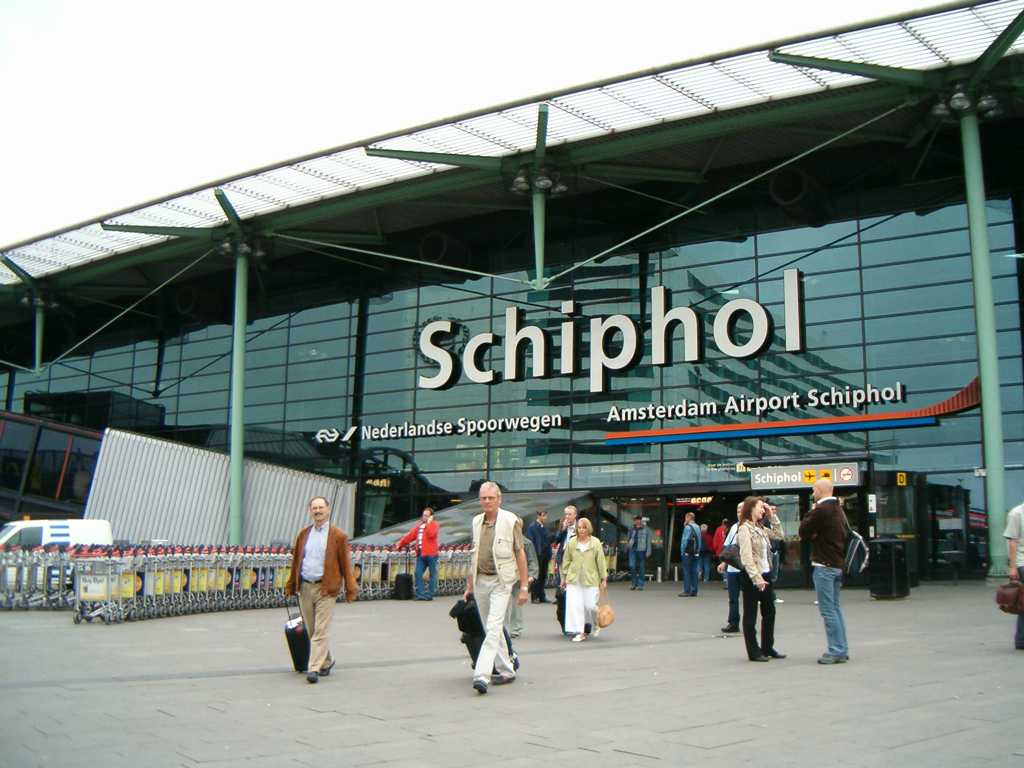
Amsterdam Airport Schiphol serving Amsterdam, Netherlands

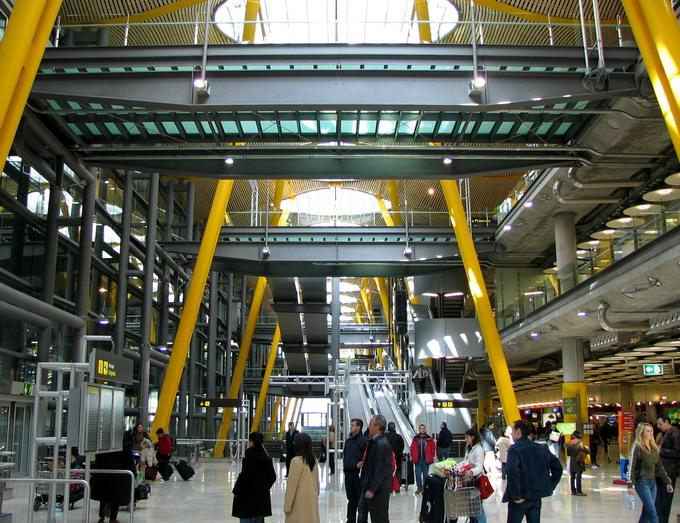
Madrid-Barajas Airport serving Madrid, Spain

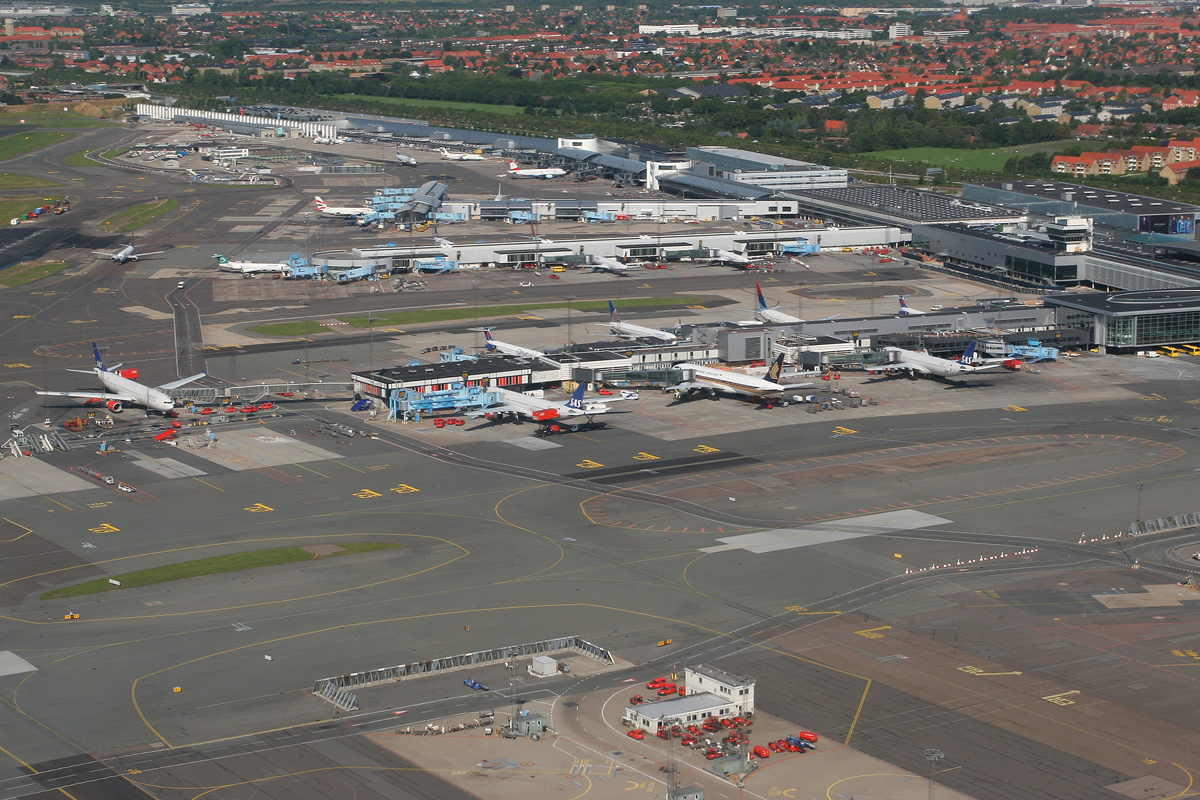
Copenhagen Airport serving Copenhagen, Denmark

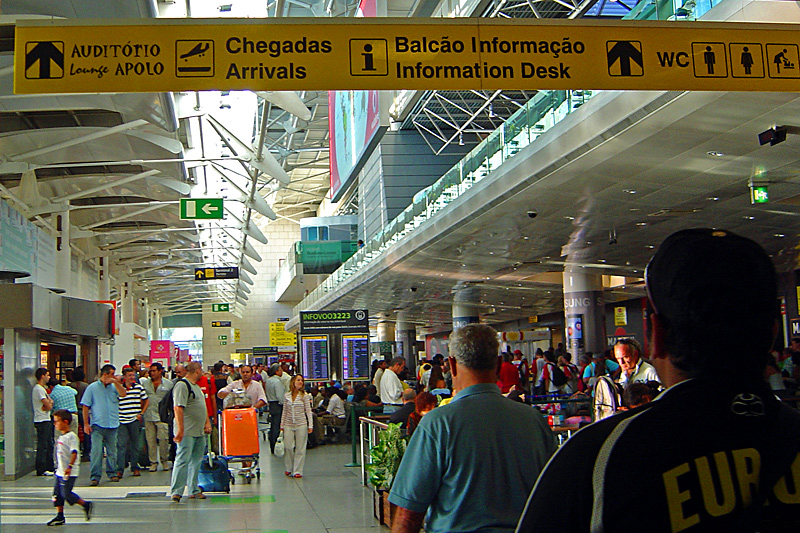
Lisbon Portela Airport serving Lisbon, Portugal

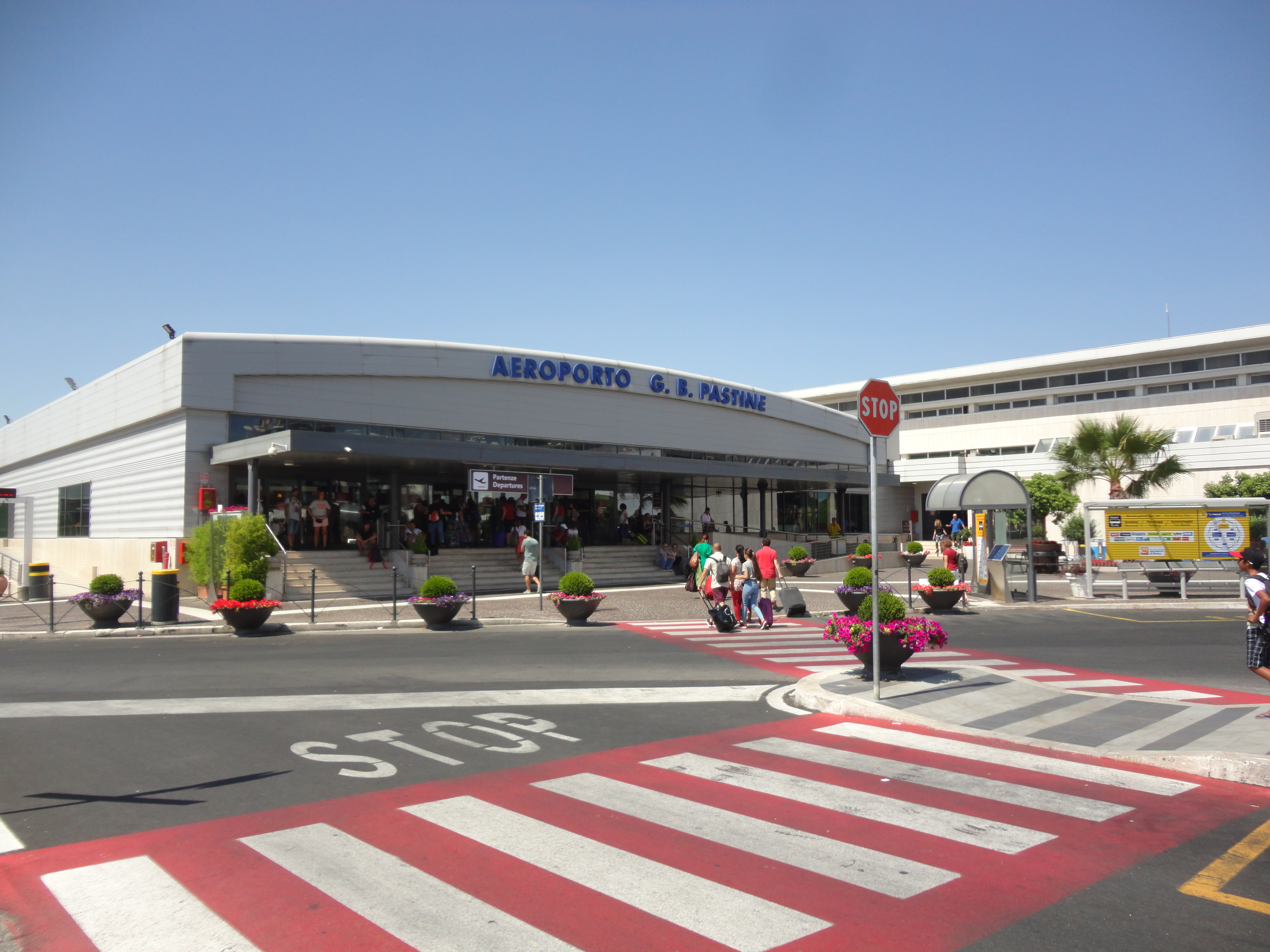
Ciampino Airport serving Rome, Italy

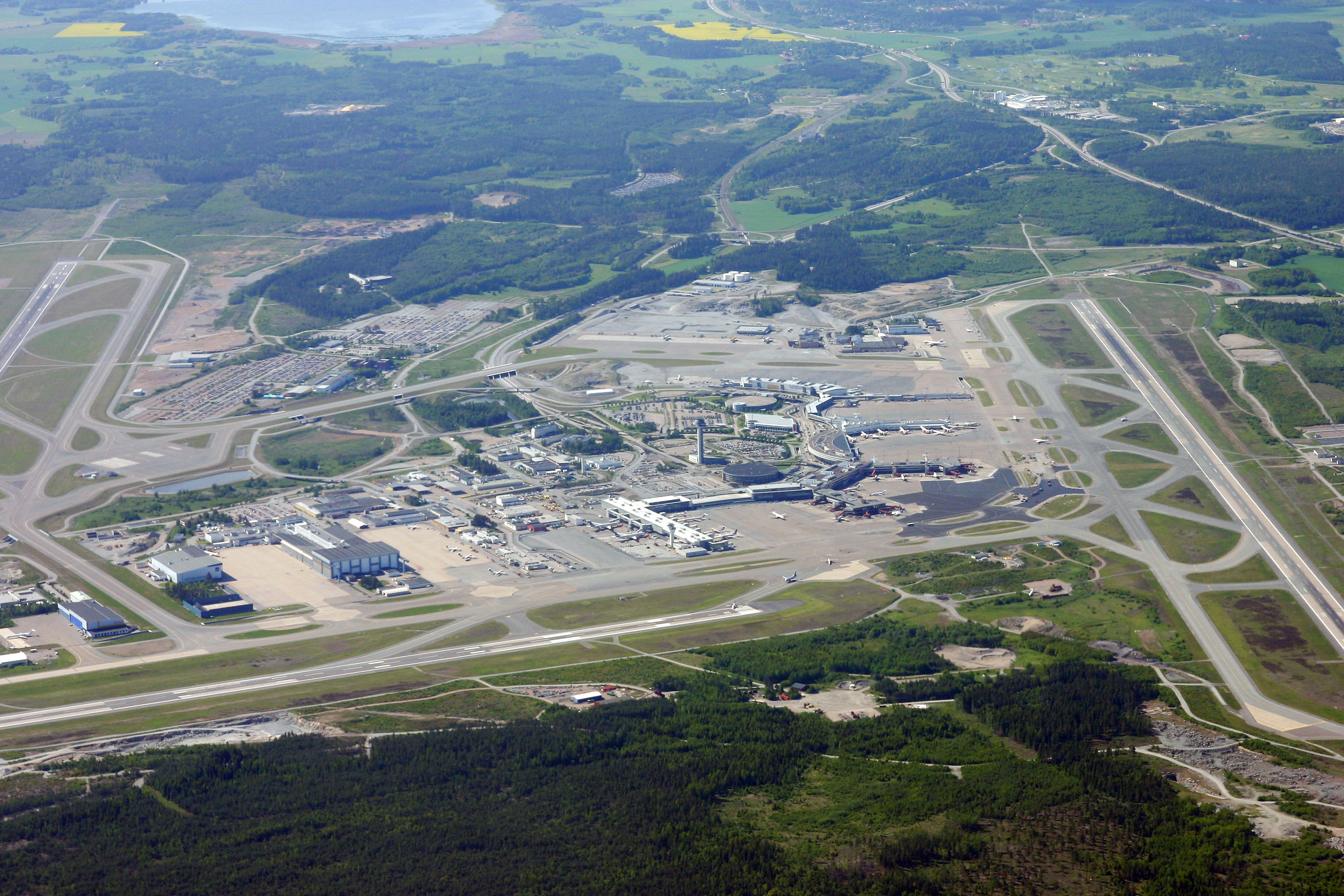
Stockholm-Arlanda Airport serving Stockholm, Sweden

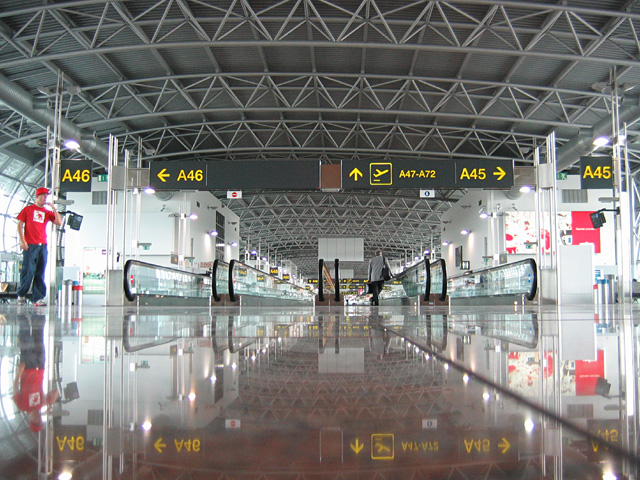
Brussels Airport serving Brussels, Belgium

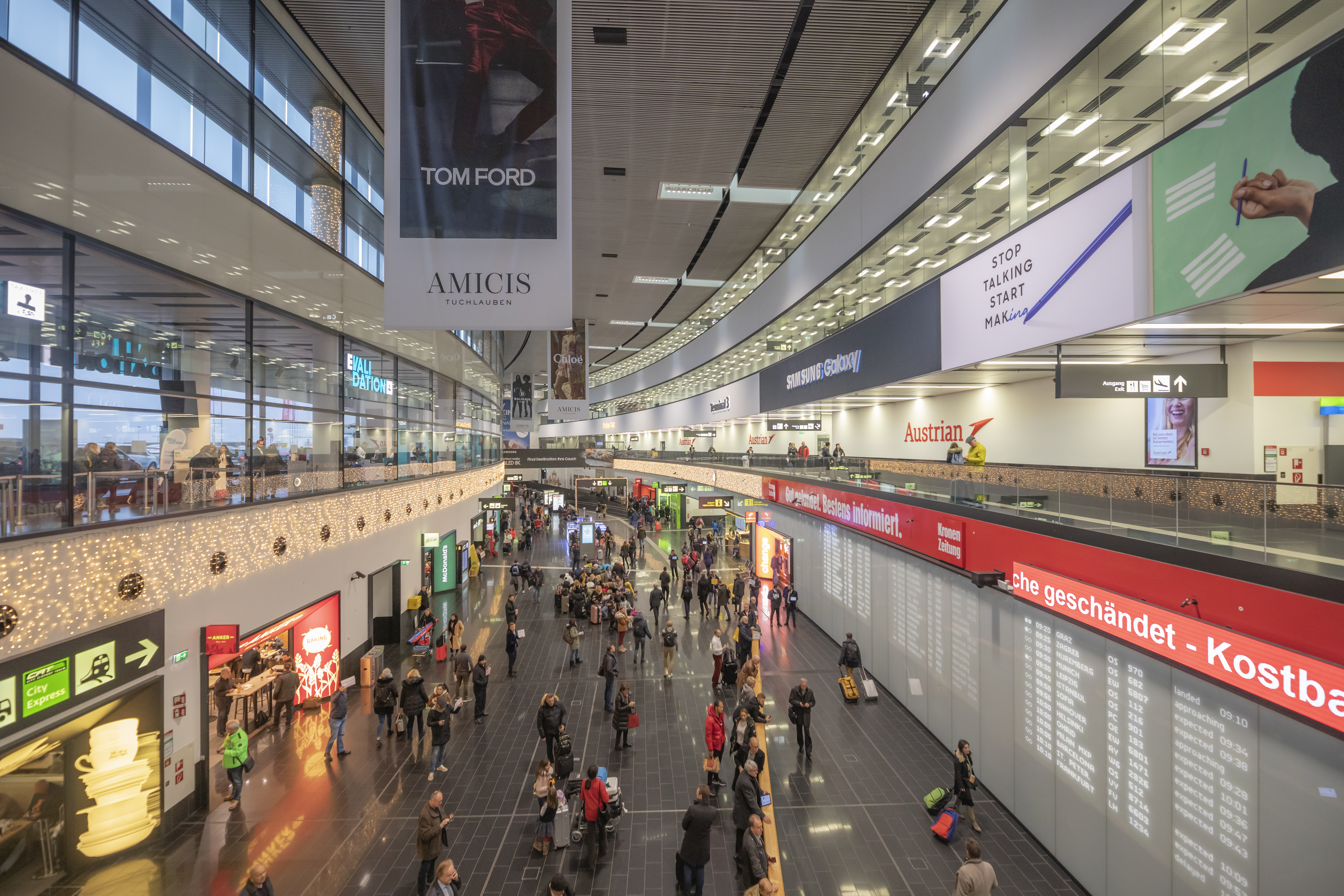
Vienna Airport serving Vienna, Austria

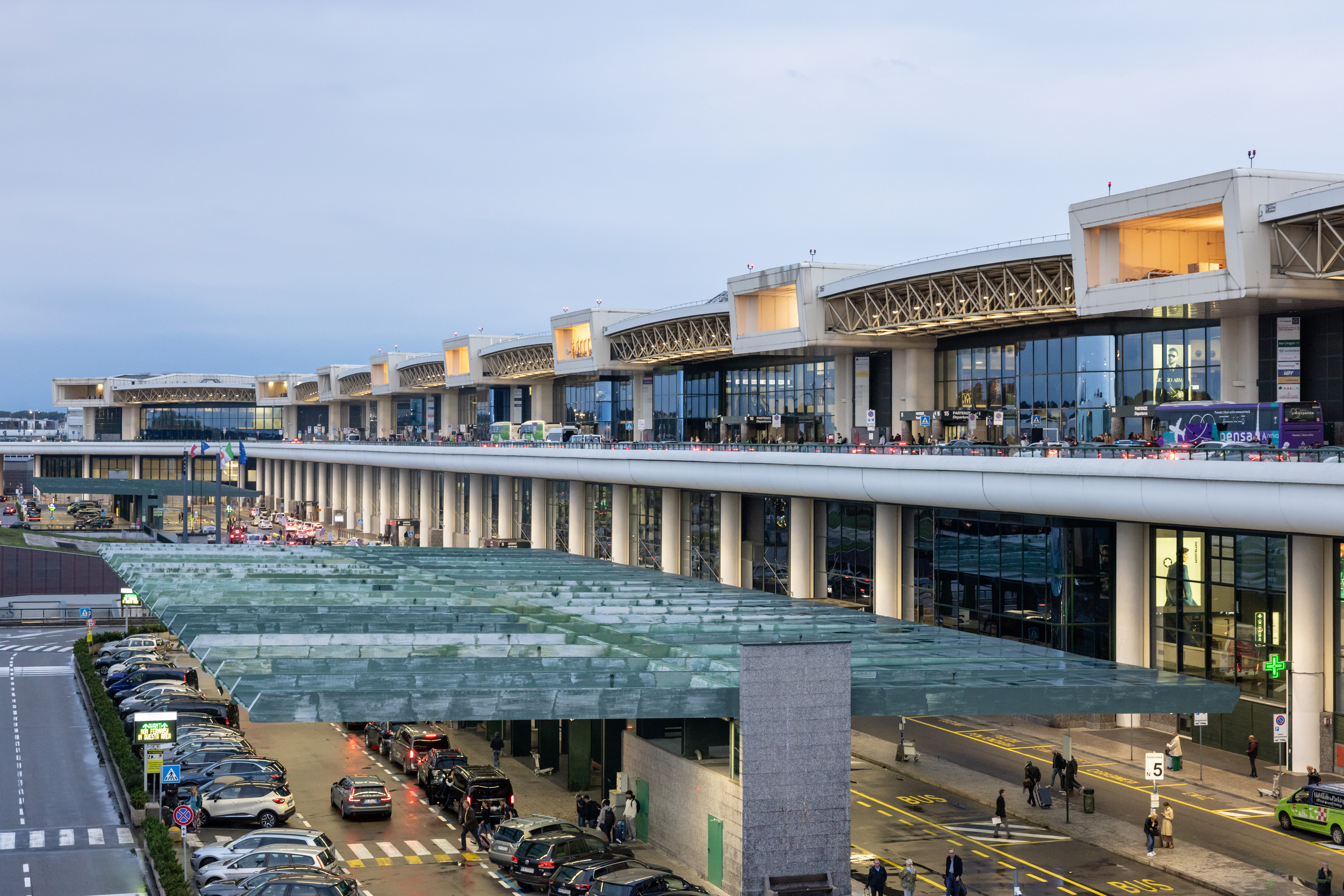
Malpensa Airport serving Milan, Italy

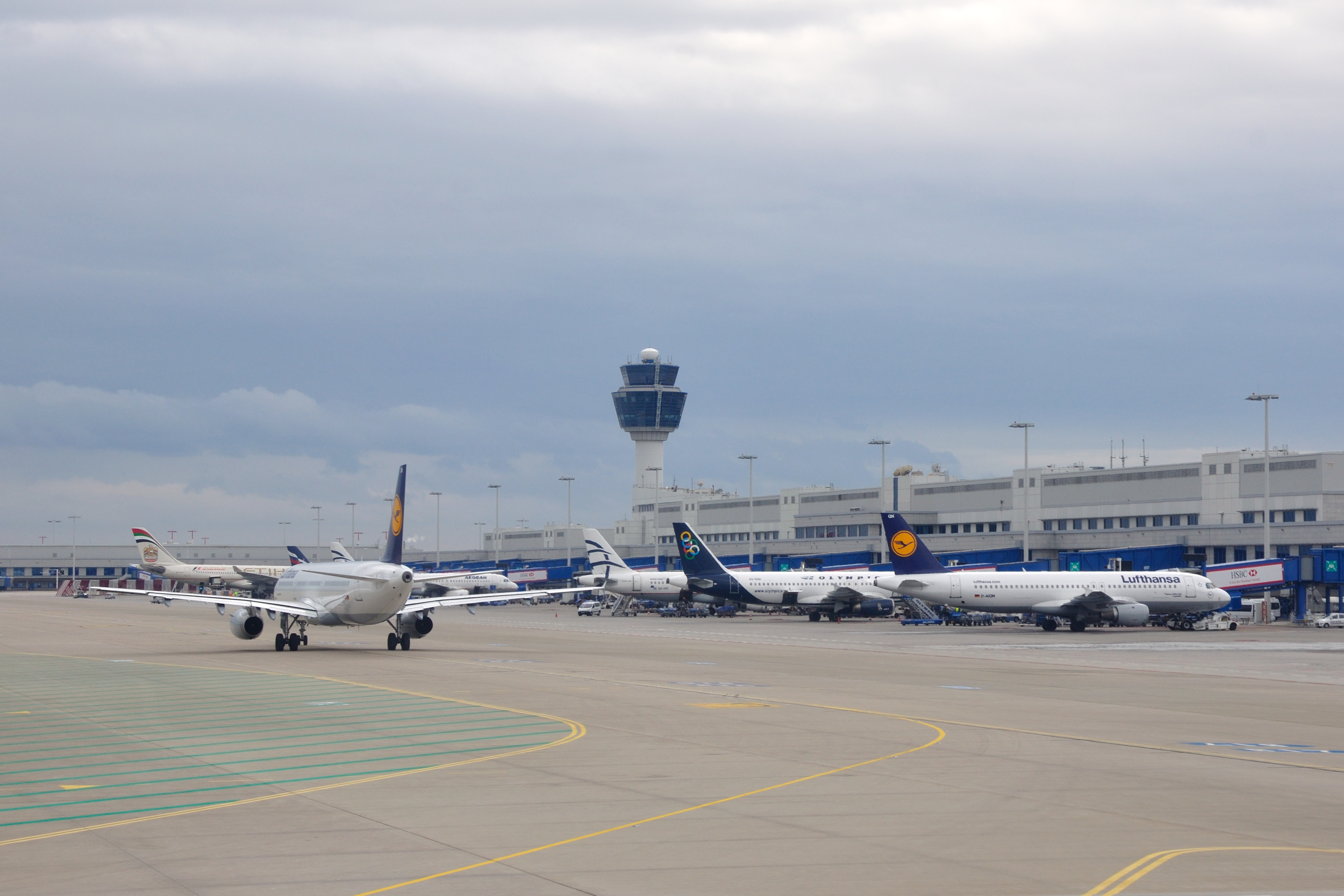
Athens International Airport serving Athens, Greece

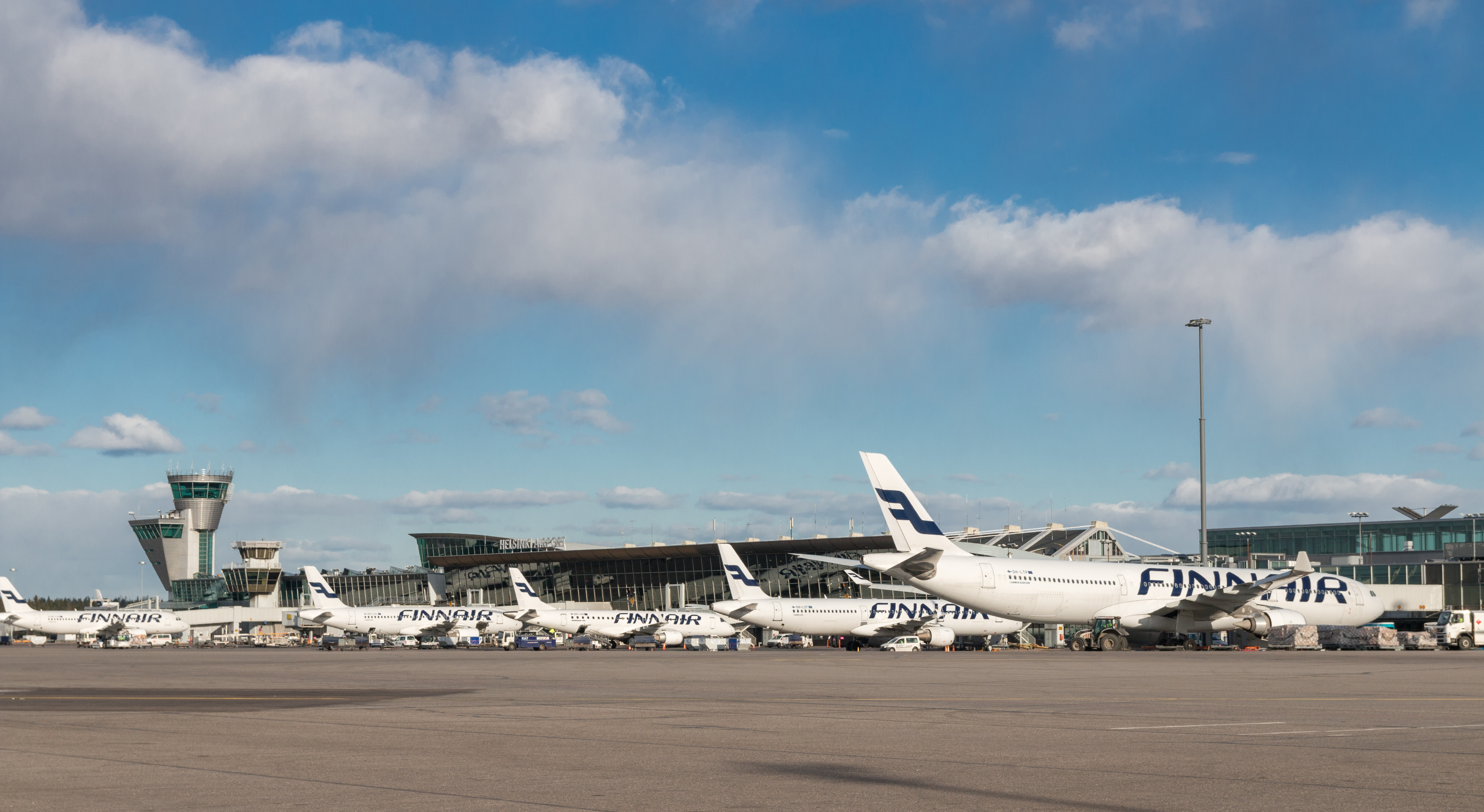
Helsinki Airport serving Helsinki, Finland

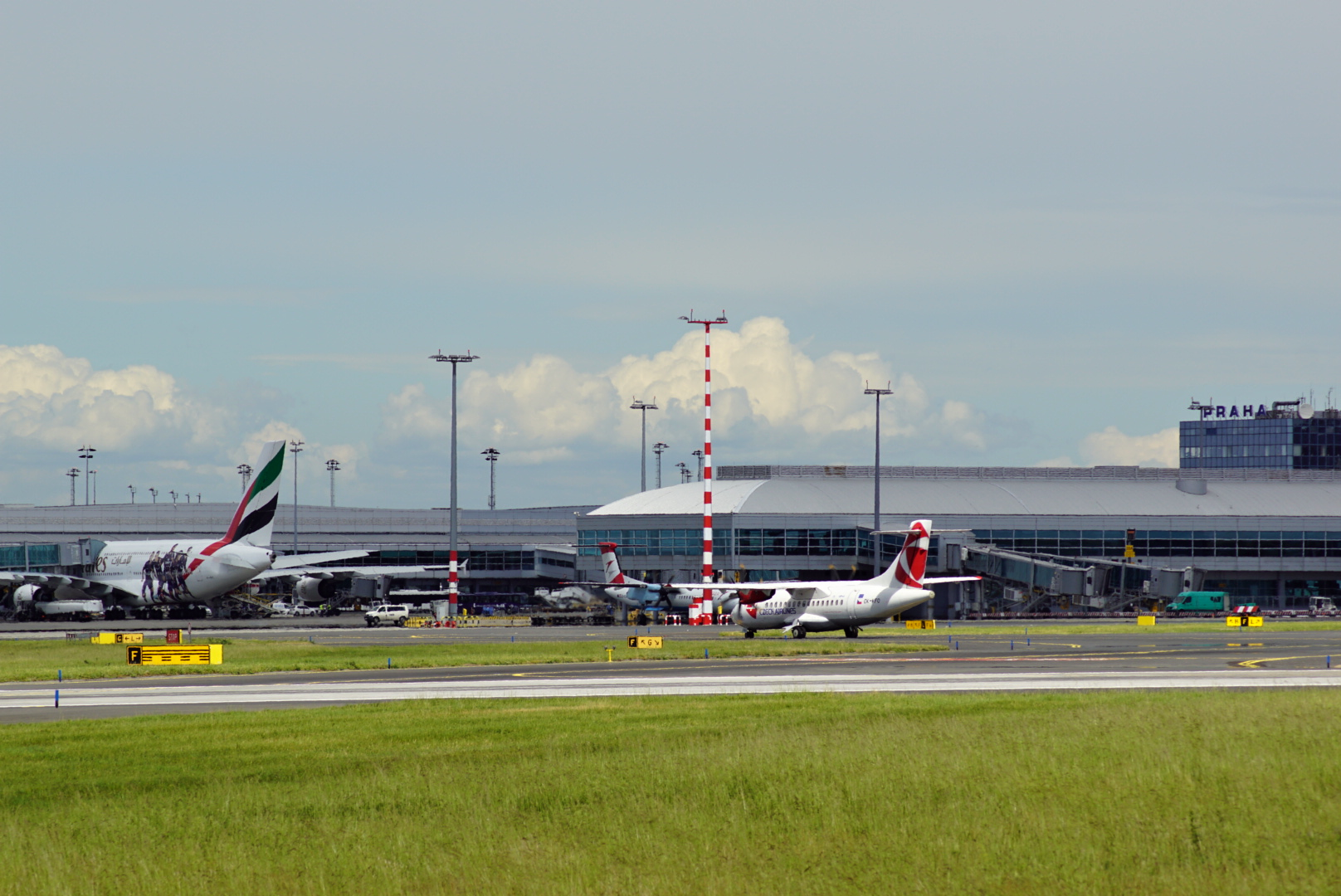
Václav Havel Airport Prague serving Prague, Czech Republic

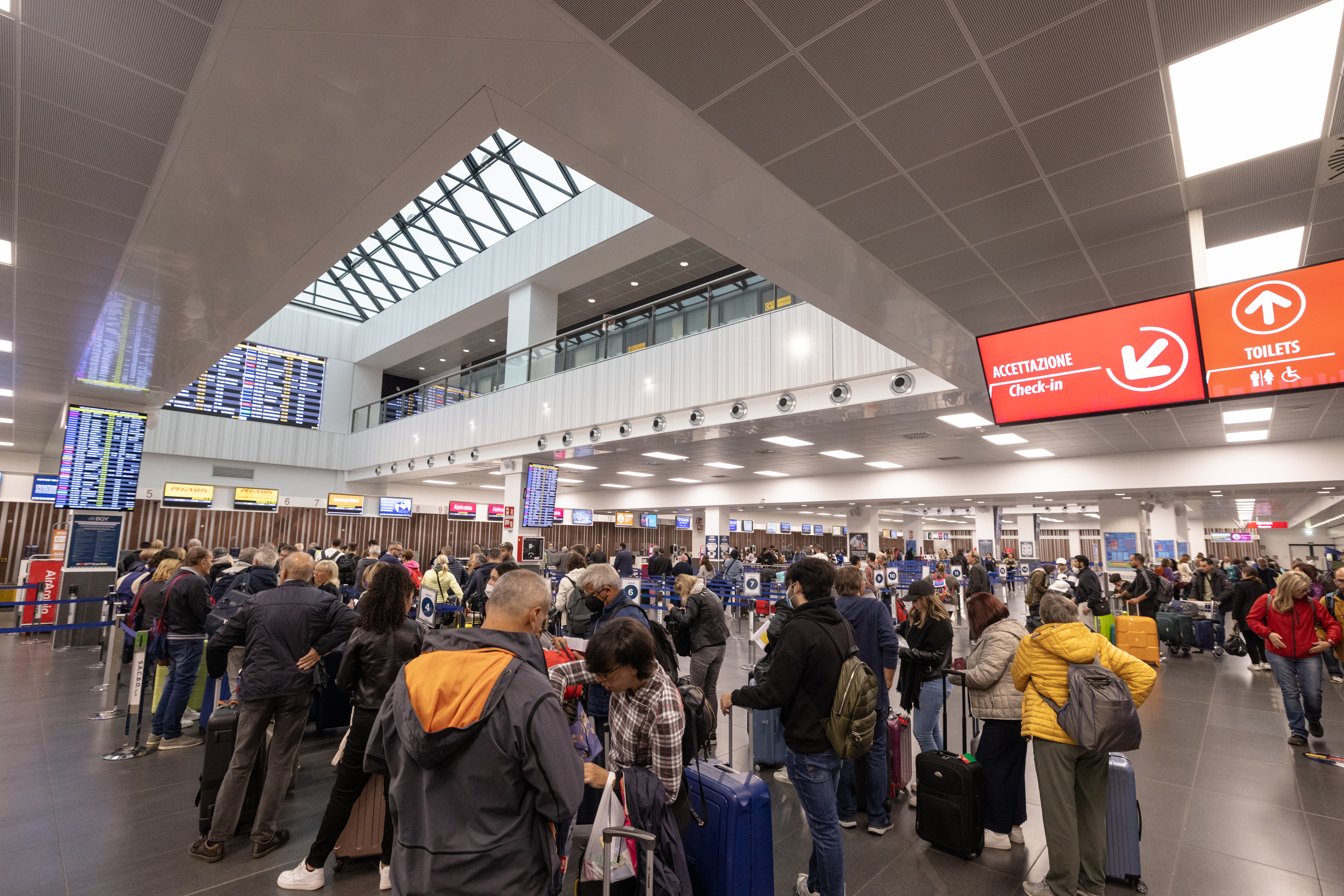
Orio al Serio Airport serving Milan, Italy

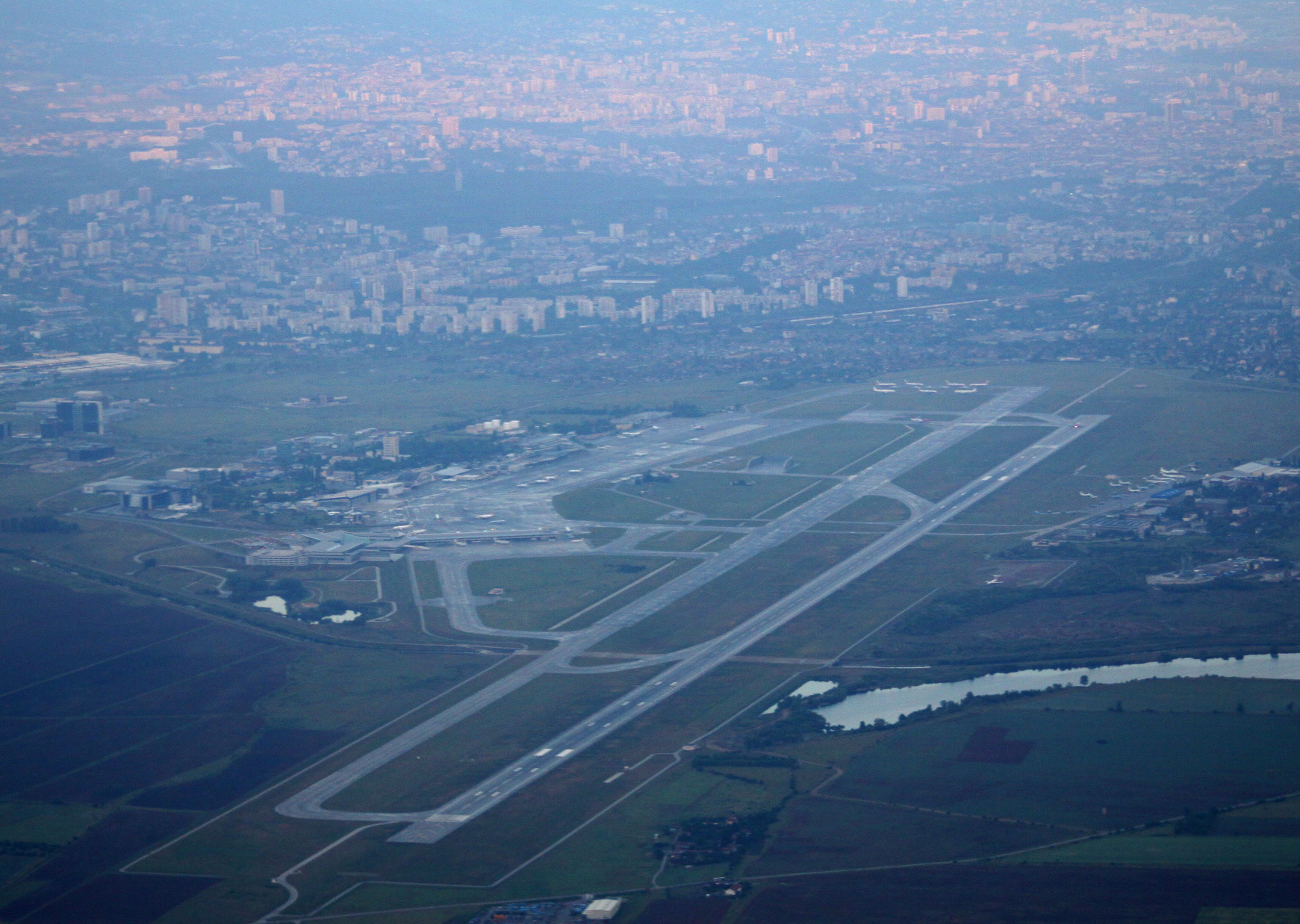
Sofia Airport serving Sofia, Bulgaria

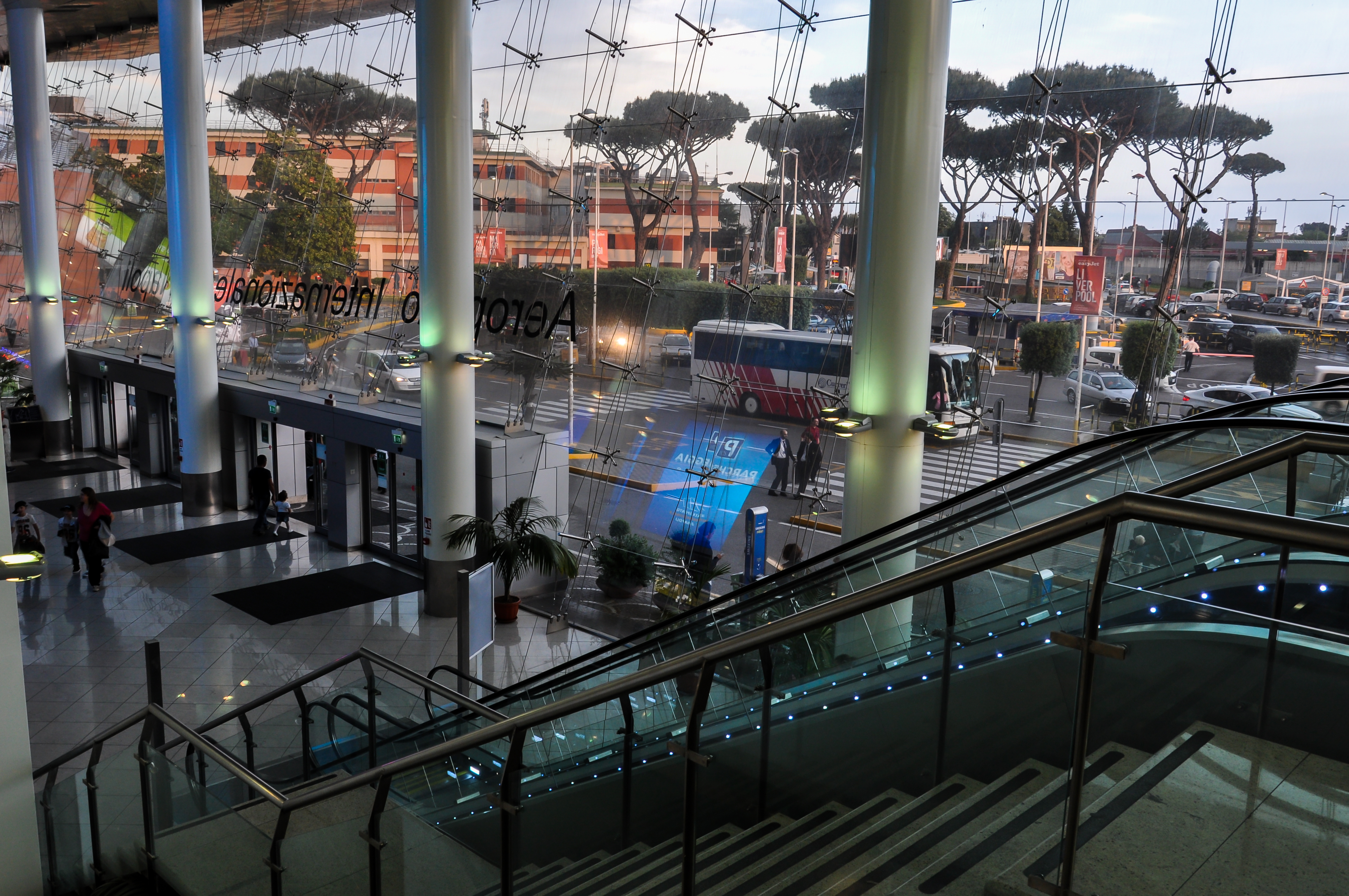
Capodichino Airport serving Naples, Italy

== See also ==
=== Lists by EU member state ===
- List of the busiest airports in the Nordic countries (Denmark, Finland, Sweden)
- List of the busiest airports in the Baltic states (Latvia, Lithuania, Estonia)
- List of the busiest airports in Austria
- List of the busiest airports in Belgium
- List of the busiest airports in Bulgaria
- List of the busiest airports in Croatia
- List of the busiest airports in France
- List of the busiest airports in Germany
- List of the busiest airports in Greece
- List of the busiest airports in Hungary
- List of the busiest airports in the Republic of Ireland
- List of the busiest airports in Italy
- List of the busiest airports in the Netherlands
- List of the busiest airports in Poland
- List of the busiest airports in Portugal
- List of the busiest airports in Romania
- List of the busiest airports in Spain

=== Other ===
- Transport in the European Union
- List of the busiest airports in Europe
- World's busiest airports by passenger traffic
- World's busiest airports by traffic movements
- World's busiest airports by cargo traffic
- World's busiest airports by international passenger traffic
- World's busiest city airport systems by passenger traffic
- Busiest airports by continent
- List of the busiest airports in the Nordic countries
- List of largest airports in the Baltic states
- Busiest airports in France by total passenger traffic
- Busiest airports in the United Kingdom by total passenger traffic
- A map showing the passenger turnover of the major European airports in 2018.
