= List of the busiest airports in Austria =

Austria has six airports that are generally used for passenger traffic. The airports are ranked by the total passengers, with the annual and rank change since the prior year.

Vienna International Airport always ranks first with tens of millions of passengers per year. This is typically followed by Salzburg Airport with around a million or two passengers per year, then Innsbruck Airport (except in 2021), Graz Airport, with Linz Airport getting a few hundred thousand passengers, and Klagenfurt Airport being ranked last.

== 2025 ==
List of the busiest airports in Austria in 2025.
Rank	Airport	Total passengers	Annual change	Rank change
1	Vienna	32,559,135	▲2.6%	Steady
2	Salzburg	1,774,454	▼0.7%	Steady
3	Innsbruck	882,876	▲2.4%	Steady
4	Graz	831,095	▲1.4%	Steady
5	Linz	262,347	▲45.4%	Steady
6	Klagenfurt	175,724	▲27.5%	Steady

== 2024 ==
List of the busiest airports in Austria in 2024.
Rank	Airport	Total passengers	Annual change	Rank change
1	Vienna	31,719,516	▲7.4%	Steady
2	Salzburg	1,787,169	▲10.7%	Steady
3	Innsbruck	862,202	▼4.9%	Steady
4	Graz	819,273	▲11.7%	Steady
5	Linz	180,485	▼22.5%	Steady
6	Klagenfurt	137,844	▼10.2%	Steady

== 2023 ==
List of the busiest airports in Austria in 2023.
Rank	Airport	Total passengers	Annual change	Rank change
1	Vienna	29,533,040	▲24.7%	Steady
2	Salzburg	1,614,601	▲31.3%	Steady
3	Innsbruck	906,655	▲25.7%	Steady
4	Graz	733,146	▲30.6%	Steady
5	Linz	232,911	▲12.1%	Steady
6	Klagenfurt	153,536	▲85.5%	Steady

== 2022 ==
List of the busiest airports in Austria in 2022.
Rank	Airport	Total passengers	Annual change	Rank change
1	Vienna	23,682,133	▲127.6%	Steady
2	Salzburg	1,229,495	▲310.0%	Steady
3	Innsbruck	721,412	▲474.9%	▲1
4	Graz	561,375	▲147.8%	▼1
5	Linz	207,766	▲203.2%	Steady
6	Klagenfurt	82,760	▲179.8%	Steady

== 2021 ==
List of the busiest airports in Austria in 2021.
Rank	Airport	Total passengers	Annual change	Rank change
1	Vienna	10,405,815	▲33.1%	Steady
2	Salzburg	299,845	▼55.2%	Steady
3	Graz	226,561	▲13.6%	▲1
4	Innsbruck	125,495	▼74.3%	▼1
5	Linz	68,509	▲33.5%	Steady
6	Klagenfurt	29,577	▼40.1%	Steady

== 2020 ==
List of the busiest airports in Austria in 2020.
Rank	Airport	Total passengers	Annual change	Rank change
1	Vienna	7,813,743	▼75.3%	Steady
2	Salzburg	669,790	▼61.0%	Steady
3	Innsbruck	487,437	▼57.4%	Steady
4	Graz	199,510	▼80.8%	Steady
5	Linz	51,306	▼88.2%	Steady
6	Klagenfurt	49,395	▼76.4%	Steady

== 2019 ==
Rank	Airport	Total passengers	Annual change	Rank change
1	Vienna	31,662,189	▲17.1%	Steady
2	Salzburg	1,717,991	▼6.9%	Steady
3	Innsbruck	1,144,471	▲2.2%	Steady
4	Graz	1,036,929	▲0.6%	Steady
5	Linz	436,018	▼6.4%	Steady
6	Klagenfurt	209,278	▼8.4%	Steady

== 2018 ==
Rank	Airport	Total passengers	Annual change	Rank change
1	Vienna	27,037,349	▲10.8%	Steady
2	Salzburg	1,844,362	▼2.4%	Steady
3	Innsbruck	1,119,347	▲2.5%	Steady
4	Graz	1,030,929	▲7.3%	Steady
5	Linz	465,798	▲15.7%	Steady
6	Klagenfurt	228,372	▲5.3%	Steady

== 2017 ==
Rank	Airport	Total passengers	Annual change	Rank change
1	Vienna	24,392,805	▲4.5%	Steady
2	Salzburg	1,890,164	▲8.7%	Steady
3	Innsbruck	1,092,547	▲8.5%	Steady
4	Graz	959,166	▼2.3%	Steady
5	Linz	402,007	▼7.7%	Steady
6	Klagenfurt	216,905	▲12.0%	Steady

== 2014 ==
Rank	Airport	Total passengers	Annual change	Rank change
1	Vienna	22,165,733	▲0.7%	Steady
2	Salzburg	1,819,520	▲9.4%	Steady
3	Innsbruck	991,356	▲1.0%	Steady
4	Graz	897,171	▲1.7%	Steady
5	Linz	561,295	▲2.0%	Steady
6	Klagenfurt	225,842	▼12.9%	Steady

== 2013 ==
Rank	Airport	Total passengers	Annual change	Rank change
1	Vienna	21,999,820	▼0.7%	Steady
2	Salzburg	1,662,834	▼0.2%	Steady
3	Innsbruck	981,118	▲5.4%	Steady
4	Graz	881,565	▼5.3%	Steady
5	Linz	549,961	▼11.8%	Steady
6	Klagenfurt	259,336	▼7.5%	Steady

== 2012 ==
Rank	Airport	Total passengers	Annual change	Rank change
1	Vienna	22,165,733	▲5.1%	Steady
2	Salzburg	1,666,487	▼2.0%	Steady
3	Innsbruck	930,850	▼6.6%	Steady
4	Graz	930,448	▼4.7%	Steady
5	Linz	623,383	▼8.2%	Steady
6	Klagenfurt	280,434	▼25.5%	Steady

== 2011 ==
Rank	Airport	Total passengers	Annual change	Rank change
1	Vienna	21,096,383	▲7.2%	Steady
2	Salzburg	1,700,983	▲4.6%	Steady
3	Innsbruck	997,020	▼3.5%	Steady
4	Graz	976,414	▼1.3%	Steady
5	Linz	679,220	▼1.9%	Steady
6	Klagenfurt	376,198	▼11.9%	Steady

== 2010 ==
Rank	Airport	Total passengers	Annual change	Rank change
1	Vienna	19,682,590	▲8.7%	Steady
2	Salzburg	1,625,842	▲4.7%	Steady
3	Innsbruck	1,033,512	▲8.0%	Steady
4	Graz	989,959	▲4.4%	Steady
5	Linz	692,039	▲1.3%	Steady
6	Klagenfurt	426,935	▲4.1%	Steady
