= List of the busiest airports in Belgium =

Belgium's busiest airports by passenger traffic:

== 2023 ==
Rank	Airport	Total passengers	Annual change	Rank change
1	Brussels-Zaventem	22,184,622	▲16.9%	Steady
2	Brussels-Charleroi	9,383,810	▲13.6%	Steady
3	Ostend	376,435	▲3.2%	Steady
4	Antwerp	239,351	▲3.2%	Steady
5	Liège	166,609	▲4.6%	Steady

== 2017 ==
Rank	Airport	Total passengers	Annual change	Rank change
1	Brussels-Zaventem	24,783,911	▲13.6%	Steady
2	Brussels-Charleroi	7,698,767	▲5.4%	Steady
3	Ostend	365,345	▼16.0%	Steady
4	Antwerp	273,130	▼1.2%	▲
5	Liège	192,000	▼49.7%	▼

== 2016 ==
Rank	Airport	Total passengers	Annual change	Rank change
1	Brussels-Zaventem	21,818,418	▼7.0%	Steady
2	Brussels-Charleroi	7,303,720	▲5.0%	Steady
3	Ostend	434,970	▲57.6%	▲
4	Liège	382,000	▲27.6%	▼
5	Antwerp	276,311	▲24.9%	Steady

== 2015 ==
Rank	Airport	Total passengers	Annual change	Rank change
1	Brussels-Zaventem	23,460,018	▲6.93%	Steady
2	Brussels-Charleroi	6,956,000	▲8.01%	Steady
3	Liège	299,292	▼	Steady
4	Ostend	276,027	▲	Steady
5	Antwerp	221,153	▲82.23%	Steady
