= List of the busiest airports in Bulgaria =

This is a list of the busiest airports in Bulgaria by number of passengers begins 2013.

== In graph ==
Annual passenger traffic at SOF VAR BOJ PDV airports. See Wikidata query.

== Passenger statistics ==
Rank	Airport	City	Code (IATA/ICAO)	2013	2014	2015	2016	2017	2018	Change 17-18
1.	Sofia	Sofia	SOF/LBSF	3,504,326	3,815,158	4,088,943	4,980,387	6,490,096	6,962,040	▲7.3%
2.	Burgas	Burgas	BOJ/LBBG	2,461,648	2,522,319	2,360,320	2,878,883	2,982,339	3,277,229	▲9.9%
3.	Varna	Varna	VAR/LBWN	1,303,679	1,387,494	1,398,694	1,689,595	1,970,700	2,281,134	▲15.8%
4.	Plovdiv	Plovdiv	PDV/LBPD	91,000	103,535	103,300	77,649	91,600	133,397	▲45.6%
5.	Gorna Oryahovitsa	Veliko Tarnovo/Gorna Oryahovitsa	GOZ/LBGO	281	286	495	235	361	388	▲7.5%
	TOTAL			7,360,934	7,828,792	7,951,752	9,626,749	11,535,096	12,654,188	▲9.7%
