= Klagenfurt Airport =

Airport in Austria

Klagenfurt Airport Flughafen Klagenfurt

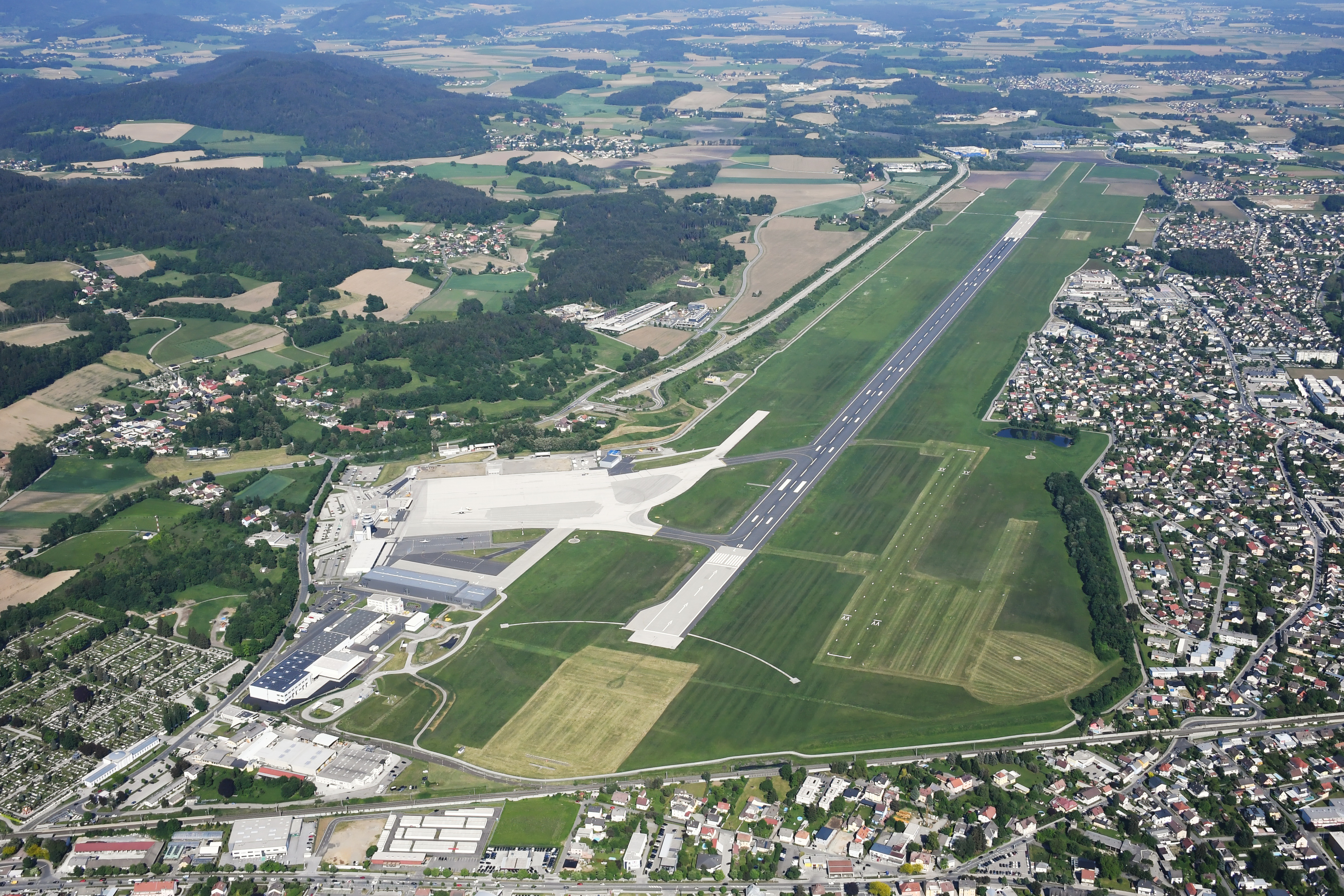
- IATA: KLU; ICAO: LOWK

Summary
- Airport type: Public
- Operator: Kärntner Flughafen Betriebsgesellschaft m. b. H.
- Serves: Klagenfurt, Austria
- Elevation AMSL: 448 m (1,470 ft)
- Coordinates: 46°38′34″N 014°20′14″E
- Website: klagenfurt-airport.at/en

Map
- Location of airport in Austria

Runways
Direction	Length		Surface
Direction	m	ft	Surface
10R/28L	710	2,329	Grass
10L/28R	2,720	8,924	Concrete

Statistics (2025)
- Passengers: 175,724 ▲+27.5%
- Aircraft movements: 2,113 ▲+20.5%
- Cargo (metric tons): 0 ±0.0%
- Source: Austrian AIP at EUROCONTROL; Statistics

Klagenfurt Airport (German: Flughafen Klagenfurt IATA: KLU, ICAO: LOWK) is a primary international airport near Klagenfurt, the sixth-largest city in Austria. It is located in the borough of Annabichl, 1.5 NM (2.8 km; 1.7 mi) north-north-east of the city centre.

== History ==
=== Early years ===
In 1905, Georg Count of Khevenhüller from Hochosterwitz Castle and in 1907 Dipl.-Ing. Joseph Sablatnig (Joseph Sablatnig was owner of the Fokker-Sablatnig, Deutsche Flugzeuge, Deutsche Motoren, Flugzeug Gesellschaft mbH, Berlin) were the first men in the sky over Carinthia and Klagenfurt.

In World War I and II, the airport of Klagenfurt was operated as a military airfield, and indeed Klagenfurt Airport was founded in 1914 as a military airport. The civil opening of Klagenfurt Airport on 17 May 1925, was an event for the City of Klagenfurt as well as for Carinthia. In June 1929, the pilot hero of World War I, Julius Fedrigoni Edler von Etschthal, has the function of flight director of the airport until 1939. After the end of World War II, Julius Fedrigoni was returned to Annabichl, he worked with low-budget flight operations. On 1 January 1952, Korv. Kpt. Julius Fedrigoni founded the Committee city of Klagenfurt and he was flight director until 1956.

From 1926 to 1938, seven airlines operated from Klagenfurt Airport. Countries like Germany, Italy, Yugoslavia and domestic flights to all major cities in Austria were connected with Klagenfurt.

=== Decrease of operations ===
In the spring of 2014, the airport's home carrier, Austrian Airlines, announced the closure of their ticketing and service counters at Klagenfurt Airport due to decreasing demand. Services were instead to be provided directly at the check-in counters. In April 2015, Austrian Airlines also announced that a closure of their domestic route to Vienna was under consideration within the next few years based on economic reasons. In the same year, the state government announced plans to partly sell its stakes in the airport to private investors.

As the airport suffered from a major decrease of passenger numbers in recent years, it was suggested by the management to establish major logistics and cargo operators here, which might be supported by the freight shipment operations handled at the relatively closely located harbours of the Adriatic Sea. The airport already features road and rail connections. However, Austrian Airlines stated later that the airport would not work for cargo operations due to noise complaints and the night curfew.

In October 2015, the Austrian Air Force announced it would end all operations and close its helicopter base at Klagenfurt Airport by the end of 2015.

=== Developments since 2020 ===
In August 2020, Ryanair announced plans to leave the airport and terminate their route to Palma de Mallorca Airport, which had been operated as a wetlease by Lauda. However, Ryanair returned with four destinations in 2023.

In 2022, the airport's then majority owner, Lilihill Group, announced the creation of a new regional airline based in Klagenfurt, Liliair. With a proposed launch in April 2023, the carrier was supposed to expand the airport's connection with major European destinations. However the announced flights were not open for booking for any date on or before the day of the launch and no operating carrier had been confirmed. Previously there was ongoing controversy between Lilihill and the state of Carinthia, which proposed to buy back the airport, leaving the Liliair project in doubt. In April 2023, Lilihill Group announced that a Liliair home base in Klagenfurt has become unlikely due to the ongoing dispute. In May 2023, the city of Klagenfurt and the state of Carinthia announced it would execute a buy-back option and re-acquired majority ownership of the airport after longstanding debate.

== Facilities ==
Klagenfurt Airport consists of one small passenger terminal building which features some shops and restaurants as well as a visitors terrace. The apron provides several stands for mid-sized planes such as the Airbus A320 as well as smaller general aviation aircraft. As there are no jet bridges, buses are used for boarding.

== Airlines and destinations ==
The following airlines offer year-round and seasonal scheduled and charter flights at Klagenfurt Airport:

Airlines	Destinations
Avanti Air	Seasonal charter: Paros
Austrian Airlines	Vienna; Seasonal: Hamburg
Eurowings	Seasonal: Cologne/Bonn
Ryanair	Seasonal: Brindisi (begins 29 March 2027), London–Stansted, Palma de Mallorca, Porto (begins 30 March 2027)
Sky Alps	Rome–Fiumicino; Seasonal: Hamburg (begins 17 December 2026), Hannover

The nearest larger international airport is Ljubljana Jože Pučnik Airport in Slovenia, approximately 70 kilometres (43 mi) to the south.

== Statistics ==
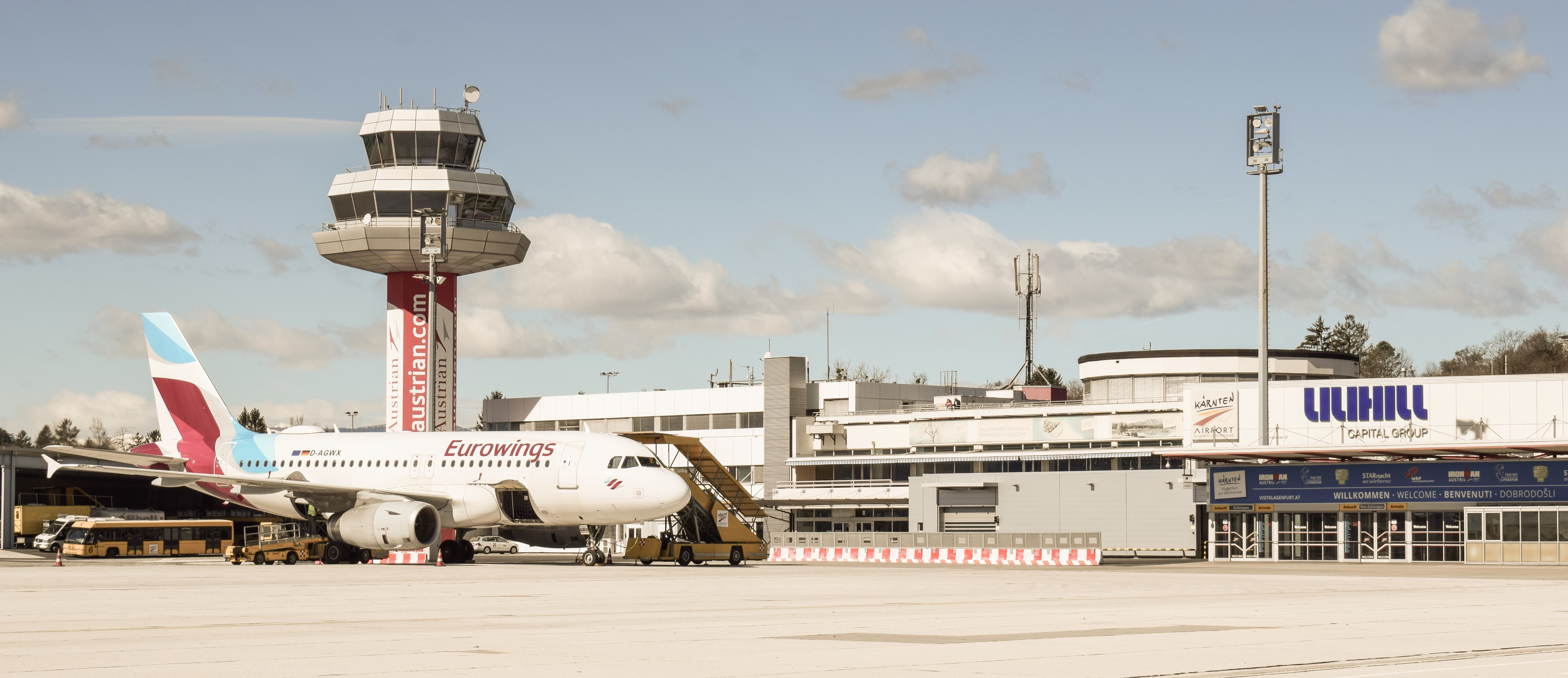
Terminal building

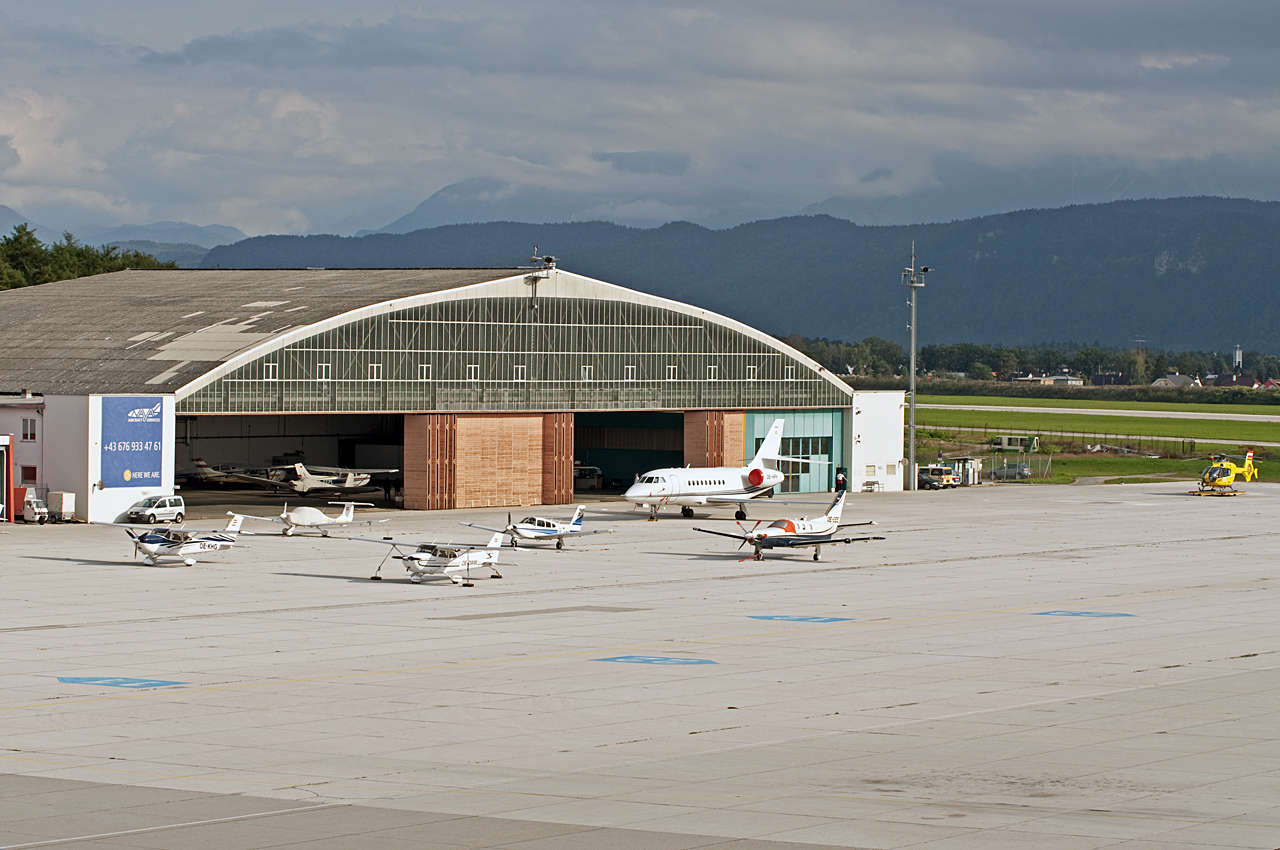
Apron view

Traffic by calendar year. Official statistics
	Passengers	Change	Aircraft operations	Change
1980	82,151	-	3,083	-
1990	148,062	▲80.23%	5,209	▲68.96%
2000	235,503	▲59.06%	8,325	▲59.82%
2005	522,697	▲121.95%	8,907	▲6.99%
2010	425,933	▼ -18.51%	7,482	▼ -16.00%
2011	375,307	▼ -11.89%	6,451	▼ -13.78%
2012	279,045	▼ -25.65%	4,576	▼ -29.07%
2013	258,421	▼ -7.39%	4,262	▼ -6.86%
2014	224,846	▼ -12.99%	3,920	▼ -8.02%
2015	227,625	▲1.24%	3,922	▲0.05%
2016	193,709	▼ -14.90%	3,392	▼ -13.51%
2017	216,905	▲11.97%	3,700	▲9,08%
2018	228,372	▲5.29%	3,566	▼ -3,62%
2019	209,278	▼ -8.36%	-	▼
2020	49,395	▼ -23.6%	439	-
2021	29,359	▼ -59.44%	272	▼ -61,96%
2022	82,431	▲280,77%	664	▲244,12%
2023	153,168	▲185,81%	924	▲139,16%
2024	137,807	▼ -8,99%	877	▼ -9,49%
2025	175,347	▲27.2%	1,057	▲20.5%
Source: Klagenfurt Airport's official website, Statistik Austria

== Ground transportation ==
=== Train ===
The train station "Klagenfurt-Annabichl" is a 5–10 minutes (750 meters) walk from the terminal and offers suburban rail services every half-hour to St.Veit (and beyond), to Klagenfurt main station, to the villages along Lake Wörthersee, and to Villach (and beyond).

=== Road ===
The airport has its own exit named Klagenfurt Flughafen on the nearby motorway A2, which leads to Vienna and Italy. A regular suburban bus service connects the airport with the city centre including the Klagenfurt central station. There is also a coach connection between Klagenfurt Airport and Ljubljana Jože Pučnik Airport, which is served several times a day.

== See also ==
- Transport in Austria
- List of airports in Austria
